= Japanese ship Kumano =

Three warships of Japan have been named Kumano:

- Japanese cruiser Kumano, a Mogami-class cruiser launched in 1936 and sunk in 1944
- JDS Kumano, a Chikugo-class destroyer escort launched in 1975 and stricken in 2001
- JS Kumano, a Mogami-class frigate launched in 2020 and is being fitted out.
