= List of ship launches in 1971 =

The list of ship launches in 1971 includes a chronological list of all ships launched in 1971.

| Date | Ship | Class / type | Builder | Location | Country | Notes |
|---|---|---|---|---|---|---|
| 16 January | Archerfish | Sturgeon-class submarine | Electric Boat | Groton, Connecticut | United States | For United States Navy |
| 19 January | Scandinavian Star | Ferry | Dubigeon-Normandie | Nantes | France | For Compagnie de Paquebots |
| 23 January | Cook | Knox-class frigate | Avondale Shipyard | Avondale, Louisiana | United States | For United States Navy |
| 27 January | Makishio | Uzushio-class submarine | | | Japan | For Japanese Navy |
| 6 February | Wabash | Wichita-class replenishment oiler | General Dynamics Quincy Shipbuilding | Quincy, Massachusetts | United States | For United States Navy |
| 13 February | La Moure County | Newport-class tank landing ship | National Steel & Shipbuilding | San Diego, California | United States | For United States Navy |
| 16 February | Mikuma | Chikugo-class destroyer escort | | | Japan | For Japanese Navy |
| 9 March | Columbus New Australia | Columbus New Zealand-class container ship | Howaldtswerke-Deutsche Werft | Finkenwerder | West Germany | For Hamburg Süd |
| 12 March | Esso Inverness | Tanker | Appledore Shipbuilders Ltd. | Appledore | United Kingdom | For Esso Petroleum Co. Ltd. |
| 20 March | McCandless | Knox-class frigate | Avondale Shipyard | Avondale, Louisiana | United States | For United States Navy |
| 25 March | Ranger Calliope | Fishing trawler | Brooke Marine Ltd. | Lowestoft | United Kingdom | For Ranger Fishing Co. Ltd. |
| 29 March | Sand Skua | Dredger | J. Bolson & Son Ltd. | Poole | United Kingdom | For South Coast Shipping Co. Ltd. |
| 31 March | Kamakura Maru | Kamakura Maru-type container ship | Mitsubishi Heavy Industries | Kobe | Japan | For NYK Line |
| 31 March | Kurama Maru | Kamakura Maru-type container ship | Mitsubishi Heavy Industries | Kobe | Japan | For NYK Line |
| March | IOS 3301 | Tank barge | Alabama Drydock and Shipbuilding Company | Mobile, Alabama | United States | For Ingram Corp. |
| 3 April | Shasta | Kilauea-class ammunition ship | Ingalls Shipbuilding | Pascagoula, Mississippi | United States | For United States Navy |
| 9 April | Huron | Iroquois-class destroyer | Davie Shipbuilding | Lauzon, Quebec | Canada | For Royal Canadian Navy. |
| 15 April | Bodryy | Project 1135 large anti-submarine ship | Yantar | Kaliningrad | Soviet Union | For Soviet Navy |
| 17 April | Mount Vernon | Anchorage-class dock landing ship | General Dynamics Quincy Shipbuilding | Quincy, Massachusetts | United States | For United States Navy |
| 23 April | Algonquin | Iroquois-class destroyer | Davie Shipbuilding | Lauzon, Quebec | Canada | For Royal Canadian Navy. |
| 24 April | Terje Vigen | Passenger ferry | Société Nouvelle des Ateliers du Havre | Le Havre | France | For DA-NO Linien |
| 24 April | Jarvis | Hamilton-class cutter | Avondale Shipyard | Westwego, Louisiana | United States | For United States Coast Guard |
| 24 April | Bagley | Knox-class frigate | Lockheed Shipbuilding | Seattle, Washington | United States | For United States Navy |
| 26 April | Amazon | Type 21 frigate | Vosper Thornycroft | Southampton, England | United Kingdom | For Royal Navy. |
| 8 May | Dostoynyy | Project 1135 large anti-submarine ship | Zalyv Shipyard | Kerch | Soviet Union | For Soviet Navy |
| 12 May | Royal Viking Star | Royal Viking Star-class cruise ship | Wärtsilä Helsinki New Shipyard | Helsinki | Finland | For Royal Viking Line |
| 14 May | Hoveringham VI | Dredger | Appledore Shipbuilders Ltd. | Appledore | United Kingdom | For Hoveringham Gravels Ltd. |
| 15 May | Barbour County | Newport-class tank landing ship | National Steel & Shipbuilding | San Diego, California | United States | For United States Navy |
| 21 May | Admiral Oktyabrsky | Project 1134A Berkut A large anti-submarine ship | Zhdanov | Leningrad | Soviet Union | For Soviet Navy |
| 22 May | Donald B. Beary | Knox-class frigate | Avondale Shipyard | Avondale, Louisiana | United States | For United States Navy |
| 25 May | Columbus America | Columbus New Zealand-class container ship | Howaldtswerke-Deutsche Werft | Finkenwerder | West Germany | For Hamburg Süd. |
| 29 May | Esso Caledonia | Tanker | Harland & Wolff | Belfast | United Kingdom | For Esso Petroleum Co. |
| 4 June | Silversides | Sturgeon-class submarine | Electric Boat | Groton, Connecticut | United States | For United States Navy |
| 7 June | Nirefs | Type 209 submarine | Howaldtswerke-Deutsche Werft | Kiel | West Germany | For Greek Navy. |
| 10 June | Sheffield | Type 42 destroyer | Vickers Shipbuilding and Engineering | Barrow-in-Furness, England | United Kingdom | For Royal Navy. |
| 19 June | Amey I | Dredger | Appledore Shipbuilders Ltd. | Appledore | United Kingdom | For Amey Marine Ltd. |
| 23 June | Robert E. Peary | Knox-class frigate | Lockheed Shipbuilding | Seattle, Washington | United States | For United States Navy |
| 24 June | Ranger Callisto | Fishing trawler | Brooke Marine Ltd. | Lowestoft | United Kingdom | For Ranger Fishing Co. Ltd. |
| 23 July | Aallotar | Ferry | Dubigeon-Normandie | Nantes | France | For Finland Steamship Company / Silja Line |
| 23 July | Amey II | Dredger | Appledore Shipbuilders Ltd. | Appledore | United Kingdom | For Amey Marine Ltd. |
| Unknown date | Bay Shore | Offshore supply vessel | J. Bolson & Son Ltd. | Poole | United Kingdom | For Offshore Marine Ltd. |
| 24 July | Harlan County | Newport-class tank landing ship | National Steel & Shipbuilding | San Diego, California | United States | For United States Navy |
| 28 August | Giovanna | Ore-bulk-oil carrier | C.N.Tirreno e Riuniti-Palermo | Palermo | Italy | |
| 4 September | Midgett | Hamilton-class cutter | Avondale Shipyard | Westwego, Louisiana | United States | For United States Coast Guard |
| 7 September | Swiftsure | Swiftsure-class submarine | | | United Kingdom | For Royal Navy. |
| 10 September | Ariadne | Leander-class frigate | Yarrow Shipbuilders | Glasgow, Scotland | United Kingdom | For Royal Navy. |
| 10 September | Recife | Hopper ship | Appledore Shipbuilders Ltd. | Appledore | United Kingdom | For Brazilian Government. |
| 22 September | California | California-class cruiser | Newport News Shipbuilding & Dry Dock Company | Newport News, Virginia | United States | For United States Navy |
| 25 September | Kirk | Knox-class frigate | Avondale Shipyard | Avondale, Louisiana | United States | For United States Navy |
| 29 September | U-13 | Type 206 submarine | HDW | Kiel | West Germany | For German Navy |
| 1 October | Bore VII | | Rauma | Rauma-Reopla Oy | Finland | For Angfartygs Ab Bore. |
| 2 October | Barnstable County | Newport-class tank landing ship | National Steel & Shipbuilding | San Diego, California | United States | For United States Navy |
| 8 October | Iron Somersby | Bulk carrier | Harland & Wolff | Belfast | United Kingdom | For Ropner Shipping. |
| 9 October | Batfish | Sturgeon-class submarine | Electric Boat | Groton, Connecticut | United States | For United States Navy |
| 19 October | Triton | Type 209 submarine | Howaldtswerke-Deutsche Werft | Kiel | West Germany | For Greek Navy. |
| 23 October | Mount Baker | Kilauea-class ammunition ship | Ingalls Shipbuilding | Pascagoula, Mississippi | United States | |
| 17 November | Svealand | Ferry | Helsingør Skibsværft | Helsingør | Denmark | For Linjebuss International AB |
| 20 November | Salvadore | Hopper ship | Appledore Shipbuilders Ltd. | Appledore | United Kingdom | For Brazilian Government. |
| 22 November | Parkesgate | Coaster | J. Bolson & Son Ltd. | Poole | United Kingdom | For Hull Gates Shipping Co. Ltd. |
| 25 November | Tokachi | Chikugo-class destroyer escort | | | Japan | For Japanese Navy |
| 26 November | Bore IX | | Rauma | Rauma-Reopla Oy | Finland | For Angfartygs Ab Bore. |
| November | Kitano Maru | Kamakura Maru-type container ship | NYK Line | Tsurumi | Japan | For NYK Line |
| 3 December | Svea Regina | Ferry | Dubigeon-Normandie | Nantes | France | For Rederi AB Svea / Silja Line |
| 4 December | Barbey | Knox-class frigate | Avondale Shipyard | Avondale, Louisiana | United States | For United States Navy |
| 4 December | Bristol County | Newport-class tank landing ship | National Steel & Shipbuilding | San Diego, California | United States | For United States Navy |
| 4 December | Foudroyant | Redoutable-class submarine | DCNS | | France | For French Navy. |
| 6 December | Ranger Castor | Fishing trawler | Brooke Marine Ltd. | Lowestoft | United Kingdom | For Ranger Fishing Co. Ltd. |
| 11 December | William H. Bates | Sturgeon-class submarine | Ingalls Shipbuilding | Pascagoula, Mississippi | United States | For United States Navy |
| 11 December | Anderida | Train ferry | Trosvik Verksted A/S | Brevik | Norway | For Sealink |
| 14 December | Viking 3 | Ferry | Meyer Werft | Papenburg | West Germany | For Rederi Ab Sally / Viking Line |
| 18 December | Barbro | Bulk carrier | Harland & Wolff | Belfast | United Kingdom | For Mascot A/S. |
| 18 December | Natal | Hopper ship | Appledore Shipbuilders Ltd. | Appledore | United Kingdom | For Brazilian Government. |
| Unknown date | Blakeley | Tanker | Appledore Shipbuilders Ltd. | Appledore | United Kingdom | For Bowker & King Ltd. |
| Unknown date | Bude | Tanker | Appledore Shipbuilders Ltd. | Appledore | United Kingdom | For Bowker & King Ltd. |
| Unknown date | Freight Trader | Tug | British Waterways Board | Goole | United Kingdom | For British Waterways Board. |
| Unknown date | Lloydsman | Tug | Robb Caledon Shipbuilders | Leith | United Kingdom | For United Towing Co Ltd. |
| Unknown date | Royalist | Brig | | Isle of Wight | United Kingdom | For The Marine Society & Sea Cadet Corps |
| Unknown date | GSI Mariner | Research/survey vessel | Alum Construction | Edmonton | Canada | For Geophysical Service Inc. |
