= JDS Iwase =

Chikugo-class destroyer escort

History

Japan
- Name: Iwase; (いわせ)
- Namesake: Iwase
- Ordered: 1970
- Builder: Mitsui, Tamano
- Laid down: 6 August 1971
- Launched: 29 June 1972
- Commissioned: 12 December 1972
- Decommissioned: 6 October 1998
- Home port: Sasebo
- Identification: Pennant number: DE-219
- Fate: Scrapped

General characteristics
- Class & type: Chikugo-class destroyer escort
- Displacement: 1,700–1,800 long tons (1,727–1,829 t) full load
- Length: 93.0 m (305 ft 1 in)
- Beam: 10.8 m (35 ft 5 in)
- Draught: 3.5 m (11 ft 6 in)
- Depth: 7.0 m (23 ft 0 in)
- Propulsion: CODAD propulsion system; 2 × shafts, 4 × diesel engines (16,000 hp, 12,000 kW)
- Speed: 25 knots (46 km/h; 29 mph)
- Range: 5,500 nmi (10,200 km; 6,300 mi) at 20 kn (37 km/h; 23 mph)
- Complement: 165
- Sensors & processing systems: TDS-1 Target Designation System; OPS-14 2D air search radar; OPS-17 surface search radar; FCS-1B gun FCS; OQS-3A bow sonar; SQS-35(J) VDS; SFCS-4 Underwater Battery FCS
- Electronic warfare & decoys: NOLR-5 ESM
- Armament: 2 × 3"/50 caliber guns; 2 × 40 mm AA guns; 1 × ASROC ASW missile launcher; 2 × triple 324 mm ASW torpedo tubes

JDS Iwase (DE-219) was the fifth ship of the Chikugo-class destroyer escorts of Japan Maritime Self-Defense Force.

== Development and design ==
The Chikugo class was designed as the modified variant of the Isuzu class, the preceding destroyer escort class. The main anti-submarine (ASW) weapon was changed from the M/50 375 mm (14.8 in) ASW rocket launcher to the ASROC anti-submarine missile. The octuple launcher for ASROC was stationed at the mid-deck, and the entire ship design was prescribed by this stationing.

== Construction and career ==
Iwase was laid down on 6 August 1971 at Mitsui Engineering & SHipbuilding, Tamano and launched on 29 June 1972. The vessel was commissioned on 12 December 1972 into the 34th Escort Corps of the Sasebo District Force.

On August 2, 1981, during an exhibition training at Goto-nada, the front lid of a left-sided short torpedo launcher blew in the south of Otate Island, Nagasaki Prefecture, due to an explosion of compressed air, injuring three viewers.

On March 20, 1982, she departed Etajima with 50 first-time lieutenants from the 34th flight executive candidate course, leading JDS Mikuma and JDS Michishio as flagships for voyage training toward Guam.

On May 13, 1985, the Soviet Navy Kashin-class destroyer was discovered by Iwase, 70 km northwest of Fukue Island, Nagasaki Prefecture.

On March 24, 1987, she was reorganized into the 31st Maizuru District Force Escort Corps and transferred to Maizuru.

On June 20, 1991, she was reorganized into the 34th Sasebo District Force Escort Corps and transferred to Sasebo again.

On March 19, 1994, 65 graduates of the 46th flight executive candidate course departed for practical training in the Philippines, along with JDS Chikugo and JDS Nadashio. After passing through Chichijima Futami, Guam Island Appla, Philippines Manila, and Okinawa Katsuren, she returned to Sasebo on June 27.

Reorganized into the 23rd Sasebo District Force Escort Corps on March 24, 1997.

On August 29, 1997, she arrived at Naha Port with JDS Tone. On September 1 of the same year, she participated in the Okinawa Comprehensive Disaster Prevention Drill with JDS Sawakaze and JDS Tone.

Removed from the register on October 16, 1998.
