= Japanese ship Ōi =

Two warships of Japan have been named Ōi:

- Japanese cruiser Ōi, a Kuma-class cruiser launched in 1920 and sunk in 1944
- JDS Ōi, an Isuzu-class destroyer escort launched in 1963 and stricken in 1993
