= Japanese ship Isuzu =

Two warships of Japan have been named Isuzu:

- Japanese cruiser Isuzu, a Nagara-class cruiser launched in 1921 and sunk in 1945
- JDS Isuzu, an Isuzu-class destroyer escort launched in 1961 and stricken in 1992
