= Japanese ship Kitakami =

Two warships of Japan have been named Kitakami:

- Japanese cruiser Kitakami, a Kuma-class cruiser launched in 1920 and scrapped in 1946
- JDS Kitakami, an Isuzu-class destroyer escort launched in 1963 and stricken in 1993
