= Japanese ship Yoshino =

Two warships of Japan have been named Yoshino:

- Japanese cruiser Yoshino, a cruiser launched in 1892 and sunk in 1904
- JDS Yoshino, a Chikugo-class destroyer escort launched in 1974 and stricken in 2001
