= Japanese ship Chitose =

Three warships of Japan have borne the name Chitose:

- Japanese cruiser Chitose, a Kasagi-class cruiser launched in 1898 and expended as a target in 1931
- Japanese aircraft carrier Chitose, a Chitose-class aircraft carrier originally launched in 1936 as a seaplane carrier, converted into a light aircraft carrier in 1943, and sunk in 1944
- JDS Chitose, a Chikugo-class destroyer escort launched in 1971 and stricken in 1999
