= Kumano =

Kumano (熊野) literally means 'Bear Field'. It is a name adopted by various places in Japan.

- Kumano Shrine
- Kumano Shrines Grand Shrines
- Kumano Kodō, ancient pilgrimage routes
- Kumano Region
- Kumano River
- Kumano, Mie, a city in Mie Prefecture
- Japanese cruiser Kumano, a Mogami class cruiser naval ship
- Japanese destroyer escort Kumano, a Chikugo class destroyer escort
- Japanese frigate Kumano, a 30DX frigate
- Kumano, Hiroshima, a town in Hiroshima
