= JDS Noshiro =

Chikugo-class destroyer escort

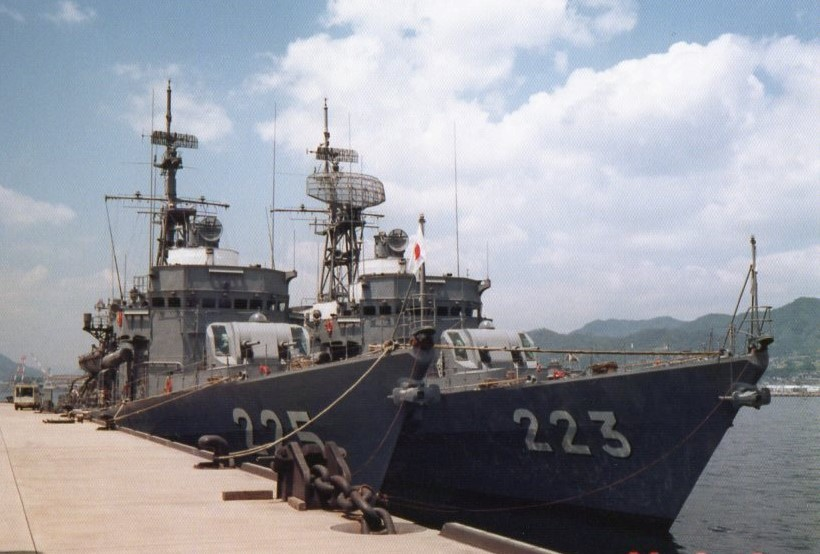
- JDS Noshiro and JDS Yoshino in 1986

History

Japan
- Name: Noshiro; (のしろ)
- Namesake: Yoshino
- Ordered: 1973
- Builder: Mitsui, Tamano
- Laid down: 27 January 1976
- Launched: 23 December 1976
- Commissioned: 30 June 1977
- Decommissioned: 13 March 2003
- Home port: Yokosuka (1977-1979); Ominato (1979-1985); Kure (1985-2003)
- Identification: Pennant number: DE-225
- Fate: Scrapped

General characteristics
- Class & type: Chikugo-class destroyer escort
- Displacement: 1,700–1,800 long tons (1,727–1,829 t) full load
- Length: 93.0 m (305 ft 1 in)
- Beam: 10.8 m (35 ft 5 in)
- Draught: 3.5 m (11 ft 6 in)
- Depth: 7.0 m (23 ft 0 in)
- Propulsion: CODAD propulsion system; 2 × shafts, 4 × diesel engines (16,000 hp, 12,000 kW)
- Speed: 25 knots (46 km/h; 29 mph)
- Range: 5,500 nmi (10,200 km; 6,300 mi) at 20 kn (37 km/h; 23 mph)
- Complement: 165
- Sensors & processing systems: TDS-1 Target Designation System; OPS-14 2D air search radar; OPS-17 surface search radar; FCS-1B gun FCS; OQS-3A bow sonar; SQS-35(J) VDS; SFCS-4 Underwater Battery FCS
- Electronic warfare & decoys: NOLR-5 ESM
- Armament: 2 × 3"/50 caliber guns; 2 × 40 mm AA guns; 1 × ASROC ASW missile launcher; 2 × triple 324 mm ASW torpedo tubes

JDS Noshiro (DE-225) was the tenth ship of the Chikugo-class destroyer escorts of Japan Maritime Self-Defense Force.

== Development and design ==
The Chikugo class was designed as the modified variant of the Isuzu class, the preceding destroyer escort class. The main anti-submarine (ASW) weapon was changed from the M/50 375 mm (14.8 in) ASW rocket launcher to the ASROC anti-submarine missile. The octuple launcher for ASROC was stationed at the mid-deck, and the entire ship design was prescribed by this stationing.

== Construction and career ==
Yoshiro was laid down on 27 January 1976 at Mitsui Engineering & Shipbuilding, Tamano and launched on 23 December 1976. The vessel was commissioned on 30 June 1977 into the 33rd Escort Corps of the Yokosuka District Force.

On July 5, 1979, she was transferred to the 35th Escort Corps of the 4th Escort Corps, and the home port was transferred to Ominato.

On March 27, 1982, the 35th Escort Corps was reorganized under the control of the Ominato District Force.

On March 27, 1985, she was transferred to the 38th Escort Corps of the Kure District Force, and the home port was transferred to Kure.

Joined the 22nd Escort Corps of the Kure District Force on April 15, 1998.

Removed from the register on March 13, 2003. The total itinerary during commissioning reached 541,588.9 nautical miles, about 25 laps around the globe.
