= JDS Arashio (SS-565) =

Asashio-class submarines

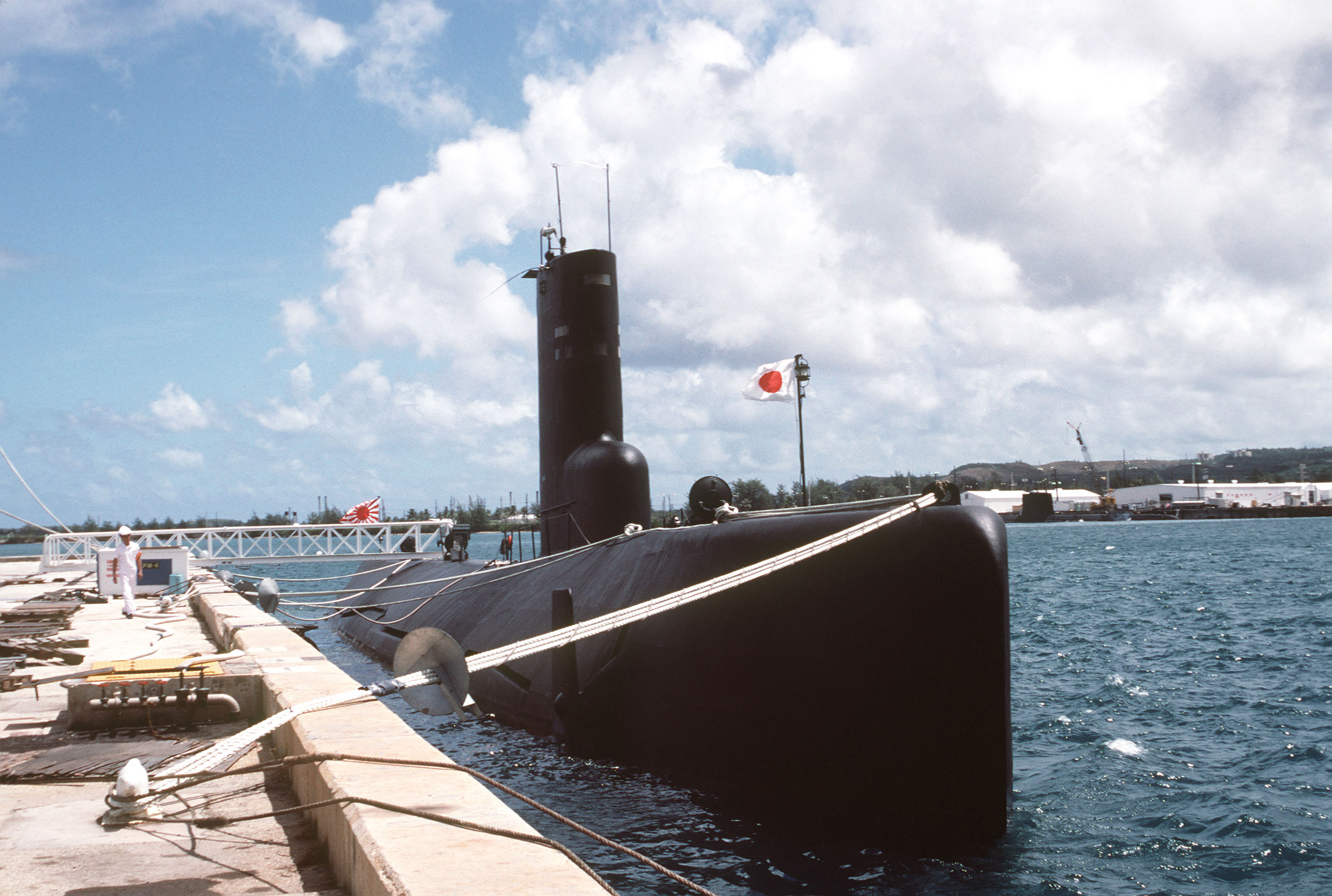
- JDS Arashio in Apra Harbor on 1 April 1984

History

Japan
- Name: Arashio; (あらしお)
- Namesake: Arashio (1937)
- Ordered: 1966
- Builder: Mitsubishi, Kobe
- Laid down: 5 July 1967
- Launched: 24 October 1968
- Commissioned: 25 July 1969
- Decommissioned: 27 March 1986
- Identification: Pennant number: SS-565
- Fate: Scrapped, 1989

General characteristics
- Class & type: Asashio-class submarine
- Displacement: 1,650 long tons (1,676 t) surfaced; 2,250 long tons (2,286 t) submerged
- Length: 88 m (288 ft 9 in)
- Beam: 8.2 m (26 ft 11 in)
- Draft: 4.9 m (16 ft 1 in)
- Depth: 7.5 m (24 ft 7 in)
- Propulsion: Diesel-electric, 2 shafts; 2,900 bhp (2,200 kW) (surfaced); 6,300 shp (4,700 kW) (submerged)
- Speed: 14 knots (26 km/h; 16 mph) surfaced; 18 knots (33 km/h; 21 mph) submerged
- Complement: 80
- Armament: 8 × 533 mm (21 in) torpedo tubes (6 × bow-tube, 2 × stern-tube)

JDS Arashio (SS-565) was the fourth boat of the Asashio-class submarines. She was commissioned on 25 July 1969.

== Construction and career ==
Arashio was laid down at Mitsubishi Heavy Industries Kobe Shipyard on 5 July 1967 and launched on 24 October 1968. She was commissioned on 25 July 1969, into the 1st Submarine Group Joined the 2nd Submarine.

She participated in dispatch training in Hawaii from September 6 to November 24, 1972.

On 27 March 1985, she became the flagship of the 1st Submarine Group.

She was decommissioned on 27 March 1986 and scrapped by Furusawa Steel in 1989.

== Gallery ==
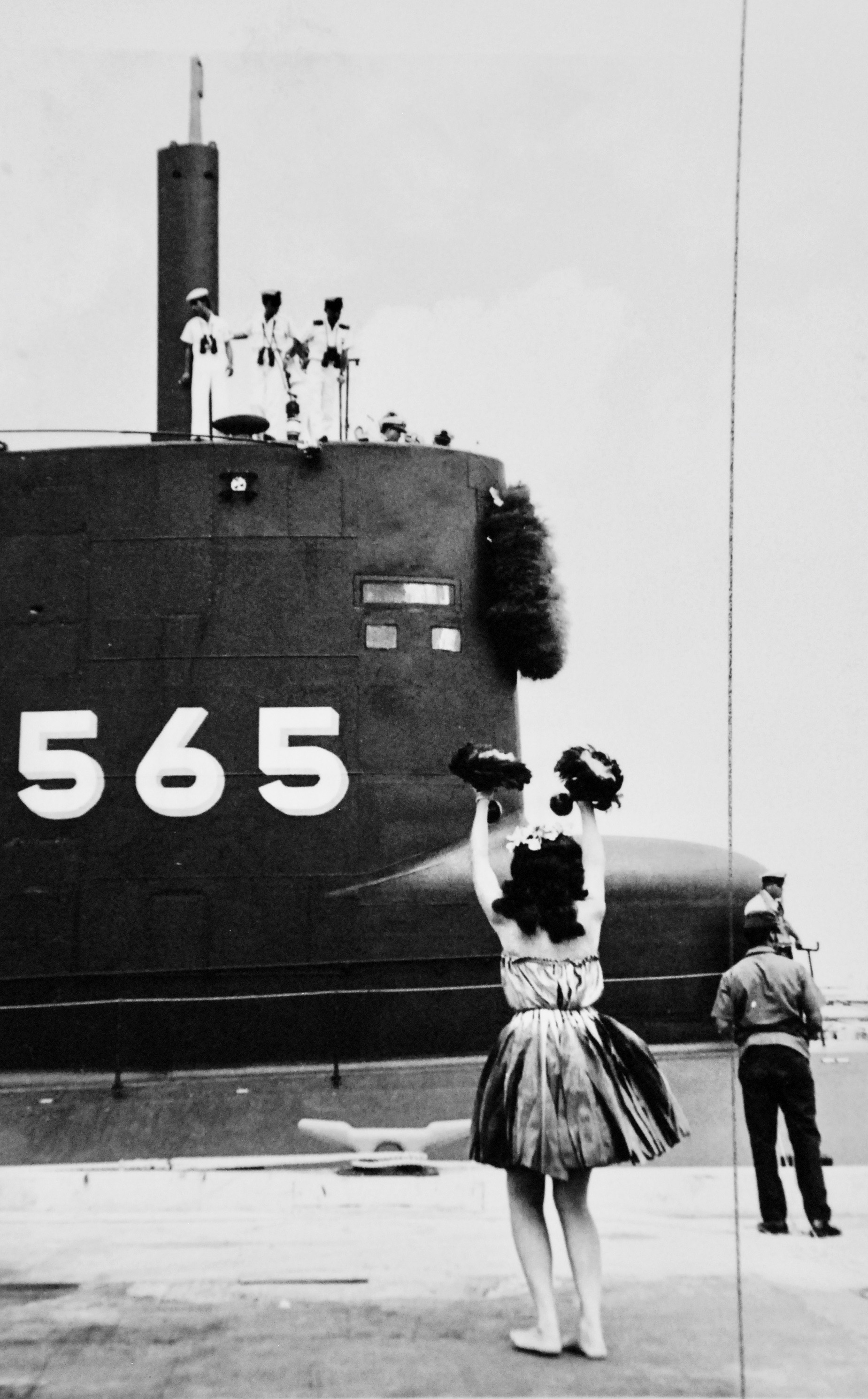
JDS Arashio in Pearl Harbor in November 1972

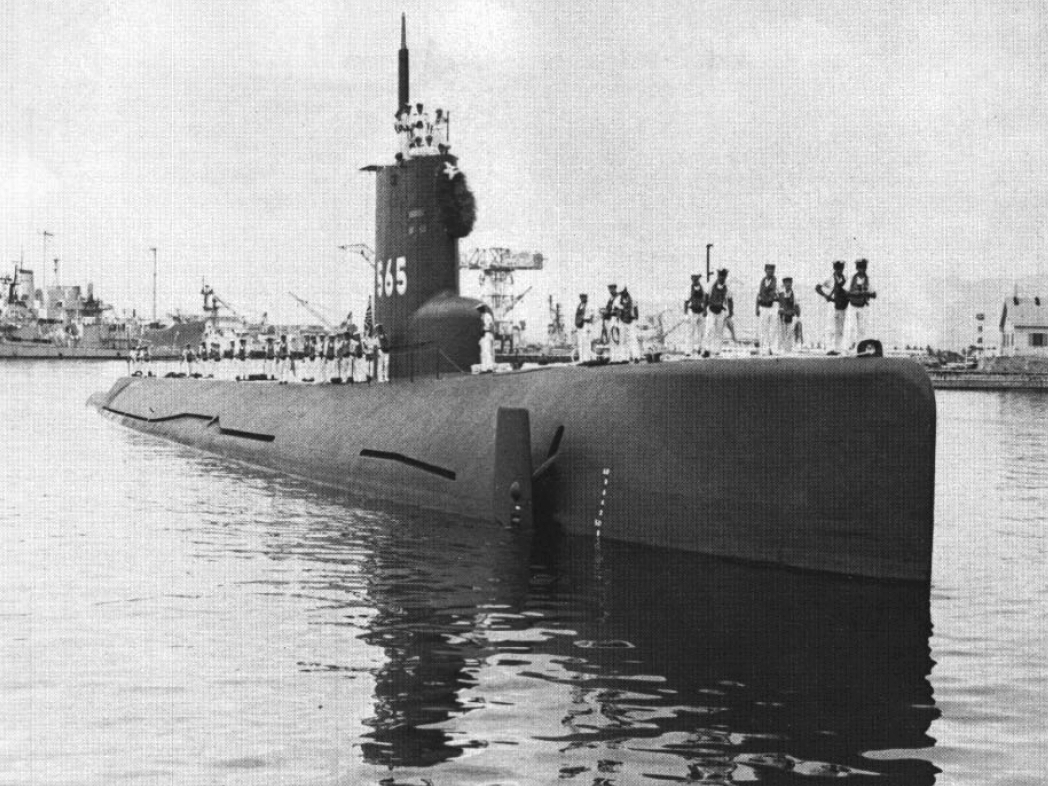
JDS Arashio in Pearl Harbor in November 1972

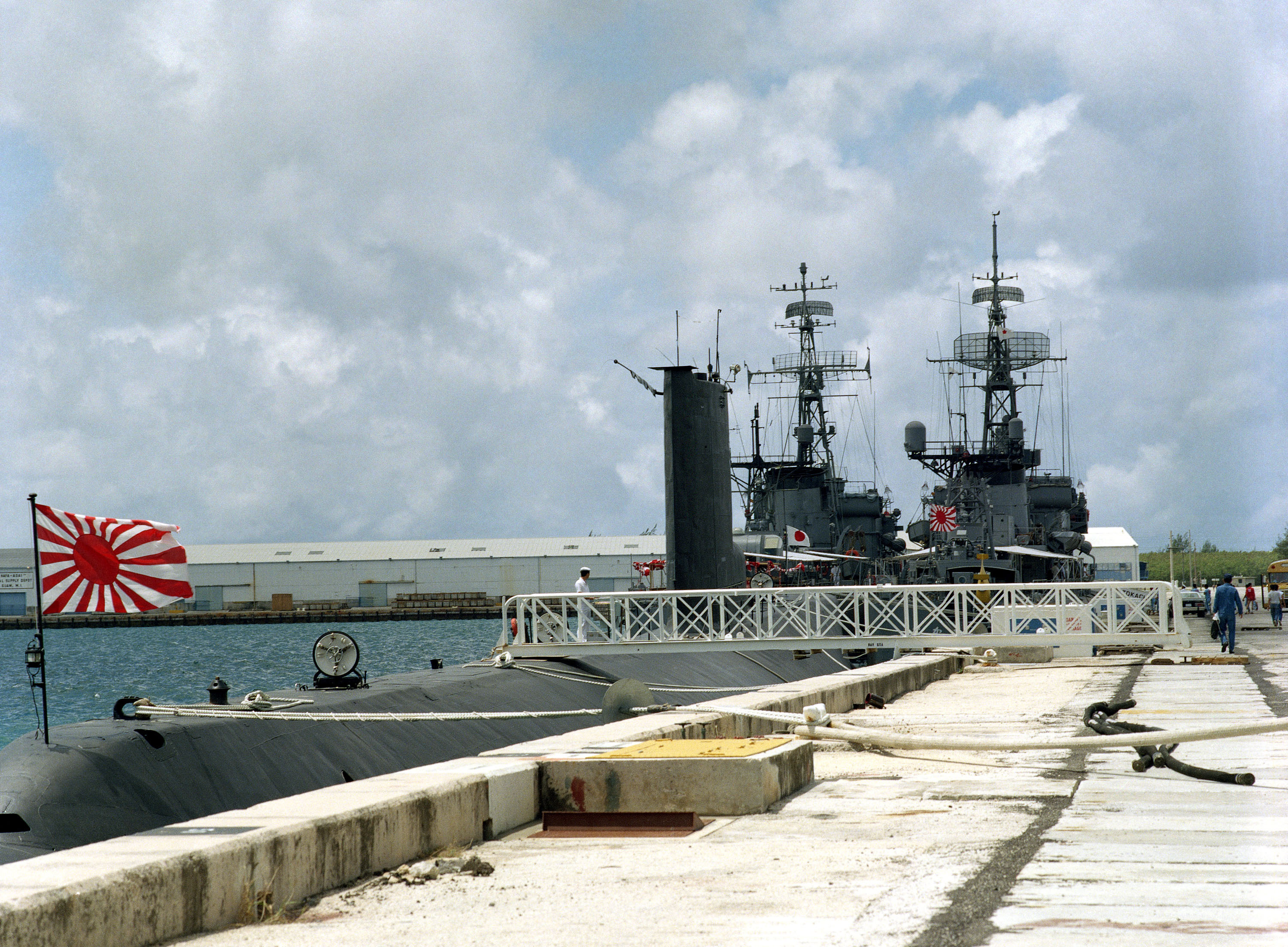
Arashio, Tokachi and Ōi in Apra Harbor on 1 April 1984
