= JDS Niyodo =

Chikugo-class destroyer escort

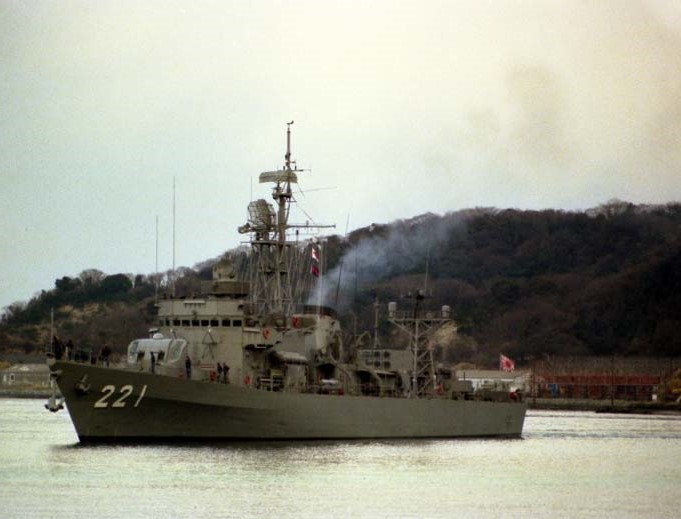
- JDS Niyodo on 16 February 1979

History

Japan
- Name: Niyodo; (によど)
- Namesake: Niyodo
- Ordered: 1971
- Builder: Mitsui, Tamano
- Laid down: 20 September 1972
- Launched: 28 August 1973
- Commissioned: 8 February 1974
- Decommissioned: 24 June 1999
- Home port: Ominato (1974-1979); Yokosuka (1979-1997); Sasebo (1997-1999)
- Identification: Pennant number: DE-221
- Fate: Scrapped

General characteristics
- Class & type: Chikugo-class destroyer escort
- Displacement: 1,700–1,800 long tons (1,727–1,829 t) full load
- Length: 93.0 m (305 ft 1 in)
- Beam: 10.8 m (35 ft 5 in)
- Draught: 3.5 m (11 ft 6 in)
- Depth: 7.0 m (23 ft 0 in)
- Propulsion: CODAD propulsion system; 2 × shafts, 4 × diesel engines (16,000 hp, 12,000 kW)
- Speed: 25 knots (46 km/h; 29 mph)
- Range: 5,500 nmi (10,200 km; 6,300 mi) at 20 kn (37 km/h; 23 mph)
- Complement: 165
- Sensors & processing systems: TDS-1 Target Designation System; OPS-14 2D air search radar; OPS-17 surface search radar; FCS-1B gun FCS; OQS-3A bow sonar; SQS-35(J) VDS; SFCS-4 Underwater Battery FCS
- Electronic warfare & decoys: NOLR-5 ESM
- Armament: 2 × 3"/50 caliber guns; 2 × 40 mm AA guns; 1 × ASROC ASW missile launcher; 2 × triple 324 mm ASW torpedo tubes

JDS Niyodo (DE-221) was the seventh ship of the Chikugo-class destroyer escorts of Japan Maritime Self-Defense Force.

== Development and design ==
The Chikugo class was designed as the modified variant of the Isuzu class, the preceding destroyer escort class. The main anti-submarine (ASW) weapon was changed from the M/50 375 mm (14.8 in) ASW rocket launcher to the ASROC anti-submarine missile. The octuple launcher for ASROC was stationed at mid-deck, leading the entire ship design.

== Construction and career ==
Niyodo was laid down on 20 September 1972 at Mitsui Engineering & SHipbuilding, Tamano and launched on 28 August 1973. The vessel was commissioned on 8 February 1974 into the 35th Escort Corps of the Ominato District Force.

On 5 July 1979, she was transferred to Yokosuka District Force 33rd Escort Corps, and the fixed port was transferred to Yokosuka.

It was transferred to the 37th Escort Corps of the Yokosuka District Force on 12 December 1989.

On 24 March 1997, she was re-incorporated into the 33rd Yokosuka District Force Escort Corps.

On 8 July 1997, she was transferred to the 23rd Sasebo District Force Escort Corps, and the home port was transferred to Sasebo.

Removed from the register on 24 June 1999.
