= JDS Ayase =

Chikugo-class destroyer escort

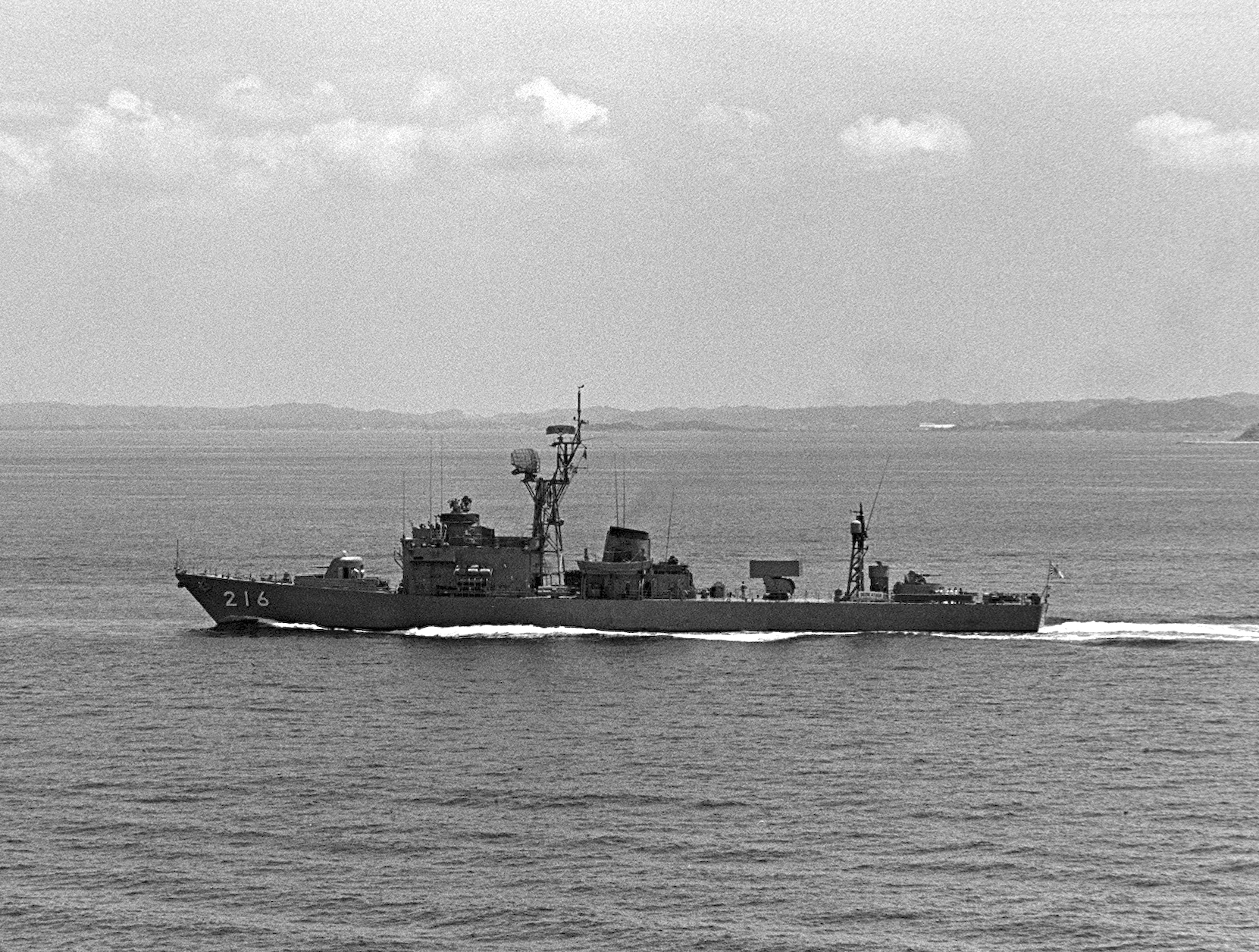
- JDS Ayase underway on 1 October 1986

History

Japan
- Name: Ayase; (あやせ)
- Namesake: Ayase
- Ordered: 1968
- Builder: Mitsubishi, Tokyo
- Laid down: 5 December 1969
- Launched: 16 September 1970
- Commissioned: 20 May 1971
- Decommissioned: 1 August 1996
- Home port: Yokosuka
- Identification: Pennant number: DE-216
- Fate: Scrapped

General characteristics
- Class & type: Chikugo-class destroyer escort
- Displacement: 1,700–1,800 long tons (1,727–1,829 t) full load
- Length: 93.0 m (305 ft 1 in)
- Beam: 10.8 m (35 ft 5 in)
- Draught: 3.5 m (11 ft 6 in)
- Depth: 7.0 m (23 ft 0 in)
- Propulsion: CODAD propulsion system; 2 × shafts, 4 × diesel engines (16,000 hp, 12,000 kW)
- Speed: 25 knots (46 km/h; 29 mph)
- Range: 5,500 nmi (10,200 km; 6,300 mi) at 20 kn (37 km/h; 23 mph)
- Complement: 165
- Sensors & processing systems: TDS-1 Target Designation System; OPS-14 2D air search radar; OPS-17 surface search radar; FCS-1B gun FCS; OQS-3A bow sonar; SQS-35(J) VDS; SFCS-4 Underwater Battery FCS
- Electronic warfare & decoys: NOLR-5 ESM
- Armament: 2 × 3"/50 caliber guns; 2 × 40 mm AA guns; 1 × ASROC ASW missile launcher; 2 × triple 324 mm ASW torpedo tubes

JDS Ayase (DE-216) was the second ship of the Chikugo-class destroyer escorts of the Japan Maritime Self-Defense Force.

== Development and design ==
The Chikugo class was designed as the modified variant of the Isuzu class, the preceding destroyer escort class. The main anti-submarine (ASW) weapon was changed from the M/50 375 mm (14.8 in) ASW rocket launcher to the ASROC anti-submarine missile. The octuple launcher for ASROC was stationed at the mid-deck, and the entire ship design was prescribed by this stationing.

== Construction and career ==
Ayase was laid down on 5 December 1969 at Mitsubishi Heavy Industries, Tokyo and launched on 16 September 1970. The vessel was commissioned on 20 May 1971 into the 33rd Escort Corps of the Yokosuka District Force with JDS Akebono.

On March 27, 1982, the 37th Escort Corps was newly formed under the control of the Yokosuka District Force and incorporated with JDS Chitose.

Ayase was transferred to the 33rd Yokosuka District Force Escort Corps on August 1, 1995, and removed from the register on August 1, 1996. She has consistently belonged to the Yokosuka District Force since commissioning, and the total itinerary during commissioning has reached 471,769 nautical miles and more than 20 laps of the earth.
