= JDS Mogami =

Isuzu-class destroyer escort

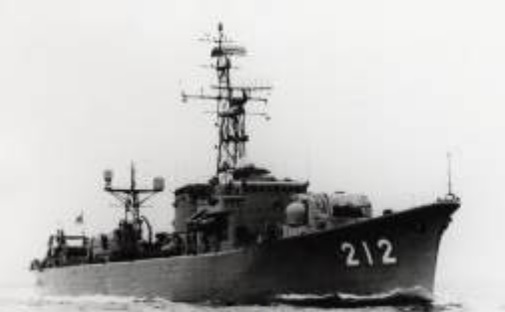
- JDS Mogami

History

Japan
- Name: Mogami; (もがみ)
- Namesake: Mogami
- Ordered: 1959
- Builder: Mitsubishi, Kobe
- Laid down: 4 August 1960
- Launched: 7 March 1961
- Commissioned: 28 October 1961
- Decommissioned: 1 July 1987
- Stricken: 20 June 1991
- Home port: Maizuru (1961-1987); Kure (1987-1991)
- Identification: Pennant number: DE-212, TV-3505
- Fate: Scrapped

General characteristics
- Class & type: Isuzu-class destroyer escort
- Displacement: 1,490 long tons (1,514 t) standard; 1,700 long tons (1,727 t) full load
- Length: 94.0 ft (28.7 m)
- Beam: 10.2 ft (3.1 m)
- Draught: 3.5 ft (1.1 m)
- Depth: 7.0 ft (2.1 m)
- Propulsion: Diesel engines, 2 shafts
- Speed: 25 knots (46 km/h; 29 mph)
- Complement: 183
- Armament: 4 × 3"/50 caliber Mk.22 guns (Type 57); 1 × Y-gun depth charge throwers; 1 × depth charge rack; 4 × 533 mm torpedo tubes; 1 × Mk.108 ASW rocket launcher; 2 × Mk.2 ASW torpedo racks

JDS Mogami (DE-212) is the second ship of Isuzu-class destroyer escort of Japan Maritime Self-Defense Force (JMSDF).

== Development and design ==
This class was the first JMSDF surface combatant adopted shelter-deck design. Propulsion systems varied in each vessel because the JMSDF tried to find the best way in the propulsion systems of future destroyer escorts. The design concept of this class and the CODAD propulsion system of the Kitakami class became the prototype for later DEs and destroyers such as the Chikugo class and Yamagumo class.

The gun system was a scaled-down version of the Ayanami class, four 3"/50 caliber Mark 22 guns with two Mark 33 dual mounts controlled by a Mark 63 GFCS. The main air-search radar was a OPS-2, Japanese variant of the American AN/SPS-12.

== Construction and career ==
Mogami was laid down on 4 August 1960 at Mitsubishi Heavy Industries, Nagasaki and launched on 7 March 1961. The vessel was commissioned on 28 October 1961 and was incorporated into the Maizuru District Force with JDS Isuzu.

Modernization work was carried out from 15 October 1974 to 5 February 1975, and the Mk 108 anti-submarine rocket launcher and Mk.2 short torpedo launcher were removed, and the Type 71 Bofors rocket launcher and Type 68 triple short torpedo launcher It was equipped.

On 1 July 1987, she was changed to a training ship, and the ship registration number was changed to TV-3505. Transferred to Training Squadron 1st Training Squadron and transferred to Kure. The remodeling work to the training ship was carried out from March 2 to June 11 of the same year, the long torpedo launcher and VDS were removed, and the trainee auditorium was newly established.

She was stricken on 25 March 1995.
