= Chikugo =

Chikugo may refer to:

- Chikugo, Fukuoka, a city in Fukuoka Prefecture, Japan
- Chikugo Province, a former province of Japan
- Chikugo River, a river in Northern Kyushu, Japan
- Chikugo-class destroyer escort
