= JDS Teshio =

Chikugo-class destroyer escort

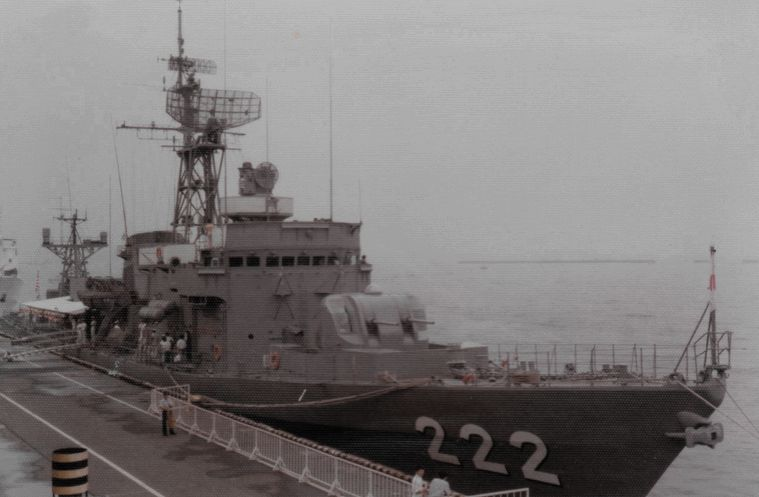
- JDS Teshio on 18 July 1980

History

Japan
- Name: Teshio; (てしお)
- Namesake: Teshio
- Ordered: 1972
- Builder: Hitachi, Maizuru
- Laid down: 11 July 1973
- Launched: 29 May 1974
- Commissioned: 10 January 1975
- Decommissioned: 27 June 2000
- Home port: Yokosuka
- Identification: Pennant number: DE-222
- Fate: Scrapped

General characteristics
- Class & type: Chikugo-class destroyer escort
- Displacement: 1,700–1,800 long tons (1,727–1,829 t) full load
- Length: 93.0 m (305 ft 1 in)
- Beam: 10.8 m (35 ft 5 in)
- Draught: 3.5 m (11 ft 6 in)
- Depth: 7.0 m (23 ft 0 in)
- Propulsion: CODAD propulsion system; 2 × shafts, 4 × diesel engines (16,000 hp, 12,000 kW)
- Speed: 25 knots (46 km/h; 29 mph)
- Range: 5,500 nmi (10,200 km; 6,300 mi) at 20 kn (37 km/h; 23 mph)
- Complement: 165
- Sensors & processing systems: TDS-1 Target Designation System; OPS-14 2D air search radar; OPS-17 surface search radar; FCS-1B gun FCS; OQS-3A bow sonar; SQS-35(J) VDS; SFCS-4 Underwater Battery FCS
- Electronic warfare & decoys: NOLR-5 ESM
- Armament: 2 × 3"/50 caliber guns; 2 × 40 mm AA guns; 1 × ASROC ASW missile launcher; 2 × triple 324 mm ASW torpedo tubes

JDS Teshio (DE-222) was the eighth ship of the Chikugo-class destroyer escorts of Japan Maritime Self-Defense Force.

== Development and design ==
The Chikugo class was designed as the modified variant of the Isuzu class, the preceding destroyer escort class. The main anti-submarine (ASW) weapon was changed from the M/50 375 mm (14.8 in) ASW rocket launcher to the ASROC anti-submarine missile. The octuple launcher for ASROC was stationed at the mid-deck, and the entire ship design was prescribed by this stationing.

== Construction and career ==
Teshio was laid down on 11 July 1973 at Hitachi Zosen Corporation, Maizuru and launched on 29 May 1974. The vessel was commissioned on 10 January 1975 into the 33rd Escort Corps of the Yokosuka District Force.

On April 13, 1999, the 33rd Escort Corps was abolished and transferred to the 21st Escort Corps of the Yokosuka District Force.

Removed from the register on June 27, 2000. The total itinerary during commissioning reached about 430,000 nautical miles and about 20 laps of the earth.
