= JDS Tokachi =

Chikugo-class destroyer escort

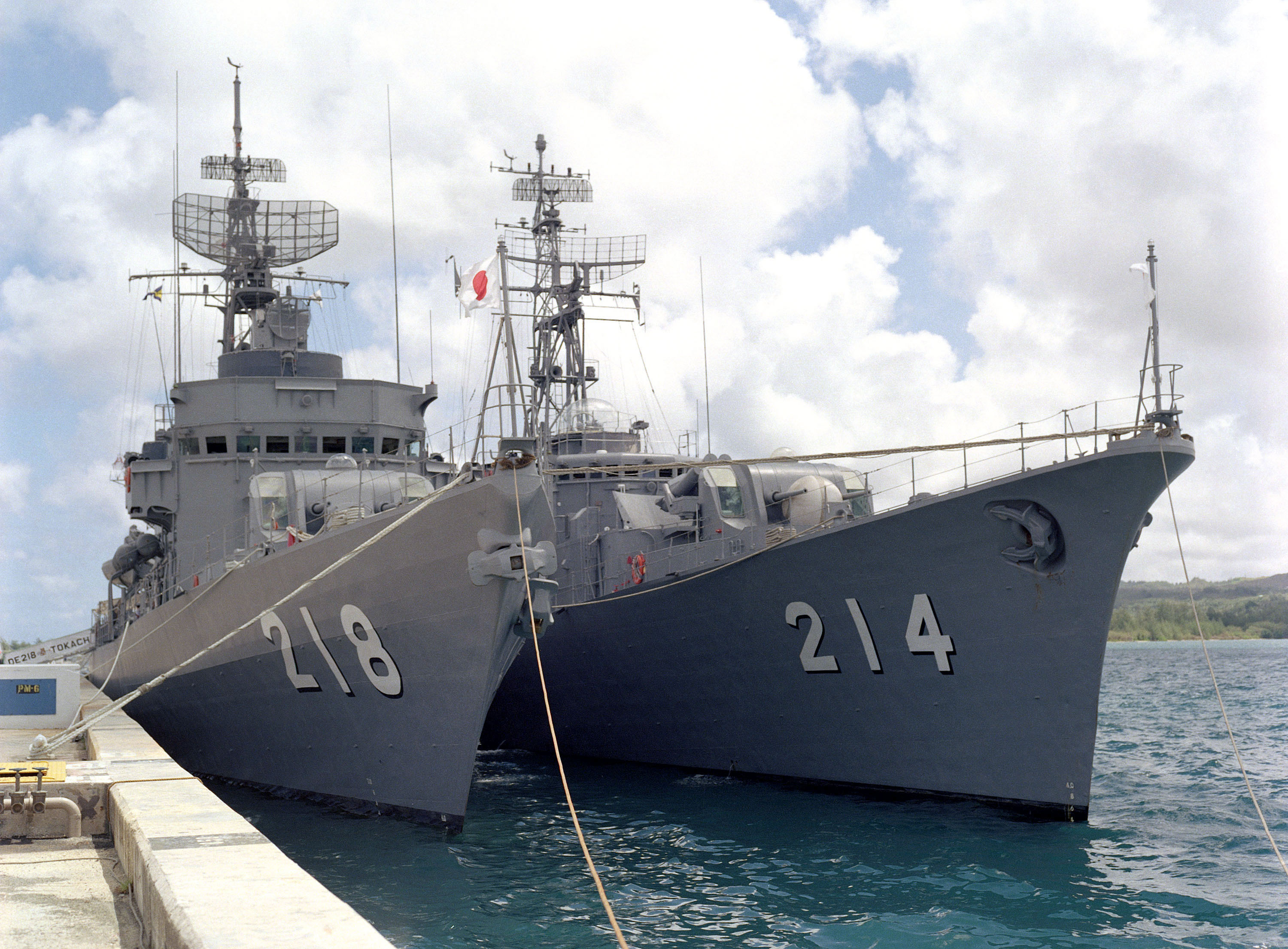
- JDS Tokachi alongside JDS Ōi on 1 April 1984

History

Japan
- Name: Tokachi; (とかち)
- Namesake: Tokachi
- Ordered: 1969
- Builder: Mitsui, Tamano
- Laid down: 11 December 1970
- Launched: 25 November 1971
- Commissioned: 17 May 1972
- Decommissioned: 15 April 1998
- Home port: Ominato (1972-1985); Kure (1985-1998)
- Identification: Pennant number: DE-218
- Fate: Scrapped

General characteristics
- Class & type: Chikugo-class destroyer escort
- Displacement: 1,700–1,800 long tons (1,727–1,829 t) full load
- Length: 93.0 m (305 ft 1 in)
- Beam: 10.8 m (35 ft 5 in)
- Draught: 3.5 m (11 ft 6 in)
- Depth: 7.0 m (23 ft 0 in)
- Propulsion: CODAD propulsion system; 2 × shafts, 4 × diesel engines (16,000 hp, 12,000 kW)
- Speed: 25 knots (46 km/h; 29 mph)
- Range: 5,500 nmi (10,200 km; 6,300 mi) at 20 kn (37 km/h; 23 mph)
- Complement: 165
- Sensors & processing systems: TDS-1 Target Designation System; OPS-14 2D air search radar; OPS-17 surface search radar; FCS-1B gun FCS; OQS-3A bow sonar; SQS-35(J) VDS; SFCS-4 Underwater Battery FCS
- Electronic warfare & decoys: NOLR-5 ESM
- Armament: 2 × 3"/50 caliber guns; 2 × 40 mm AA guns; 1 × ASROC ASW missile launcher; 2 × triple 324 mm ASW torpedo tubes

JDS Tokachi (DE-218) was the fourth ship of the Chikugo-class destroyer escorts of Japan Maritime Self-Defense Force.

== Development and design ==
The Chikugo class was designed as the modified variant of the Isuzu class, the preceding destroyer escort class. The main anti-submarine (ASW) weapon was changed from the M/50 375 mm (14.8 in) ASW rocket launcher to the ASROC anti-submarine missile. The octuple launcher for ASROC was stationed at the mid-deck, and the entire ship design was prescribed by this stationing.

== Construction and career ==
Tokachi was laid down on 11 December 1970 at Mitsui Engineering & SHipbuilding, Tamano and launched on 25 November 1971. The vessel was commissioned on 17 May 1972 into the 35th Escort Corps of the Ominato District Force.

On August 31, 1973, the 35th Escort Corps was reorganized under the 4th Escort Corps group.

On March 27, 1982, the 35th Escort Corps was reorganized into the Ominato District Force.

On March 27, 1985, she was transferred to the 38th Escort Corps of the Kure District Force, and the home port was transferred to Kure.

Dismantled at Yamaji Sangyo in Okayama City in 1999 after being removed from the register on 15 April 1998.

== Gallery ==
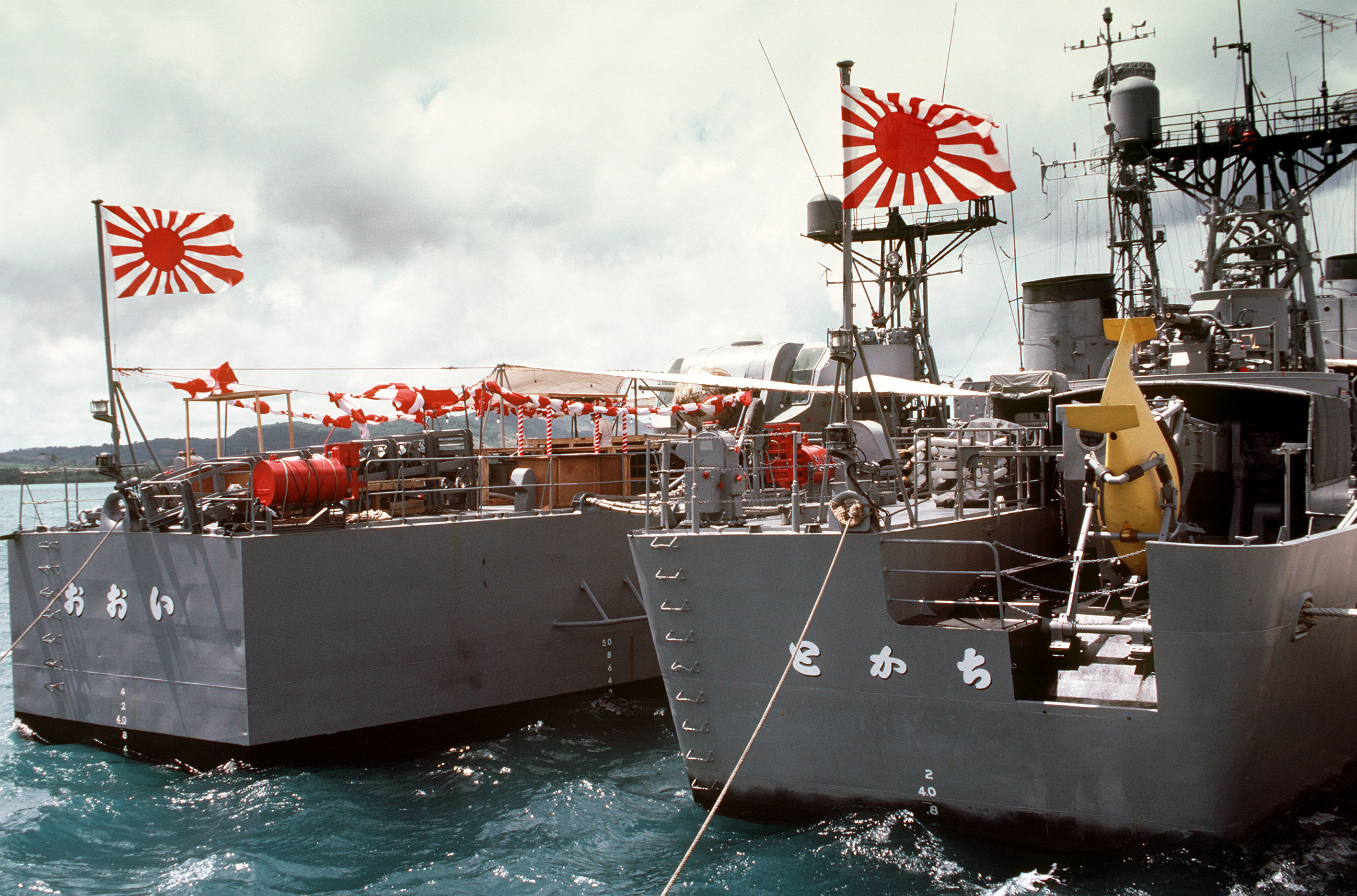
JDS Tokachi and JDS Ōi in Apra Harbor on 1 April 1984

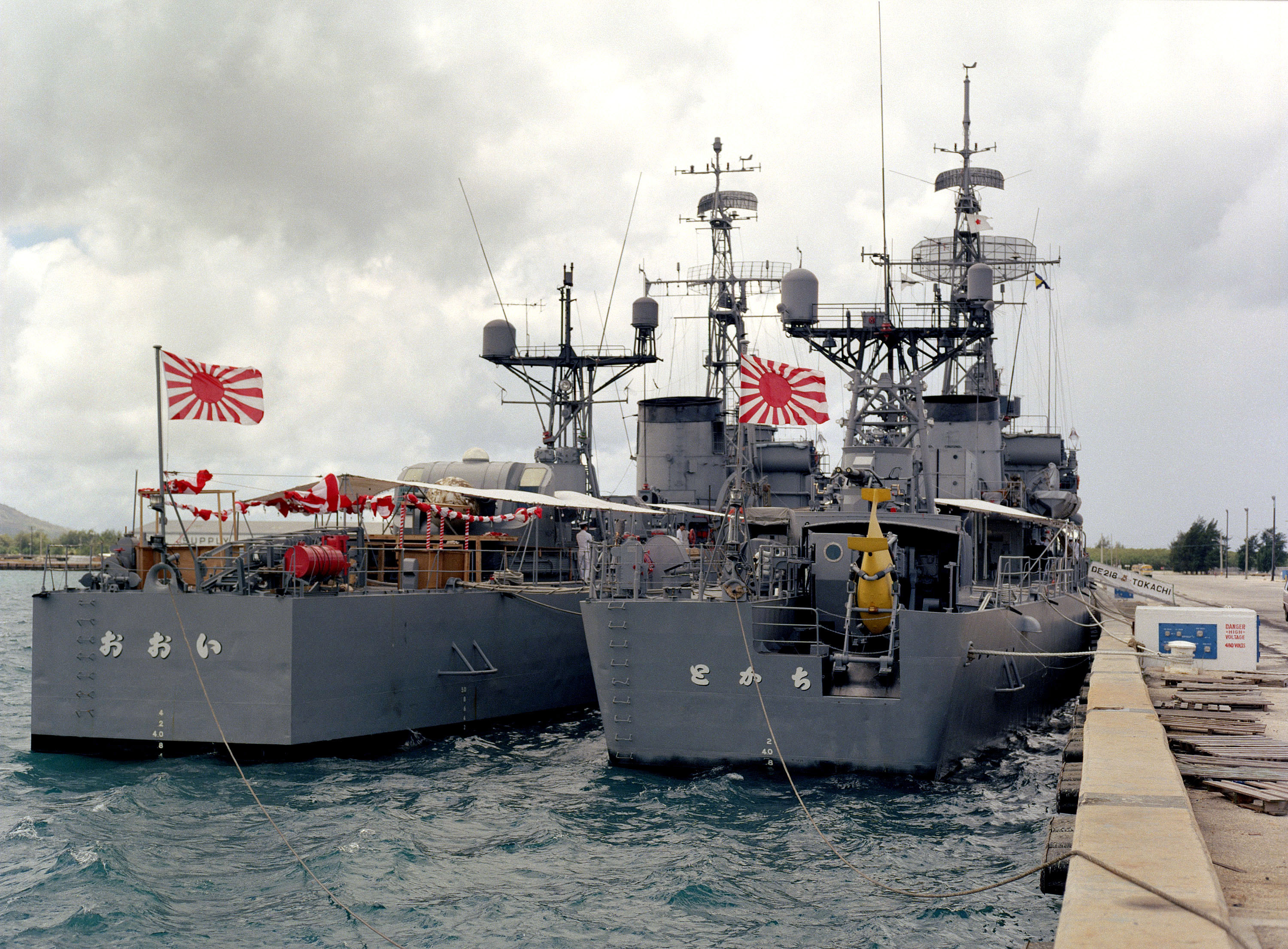
JDS Tokachi and JDS Ōi in Apra Harbor on 1 April 1984

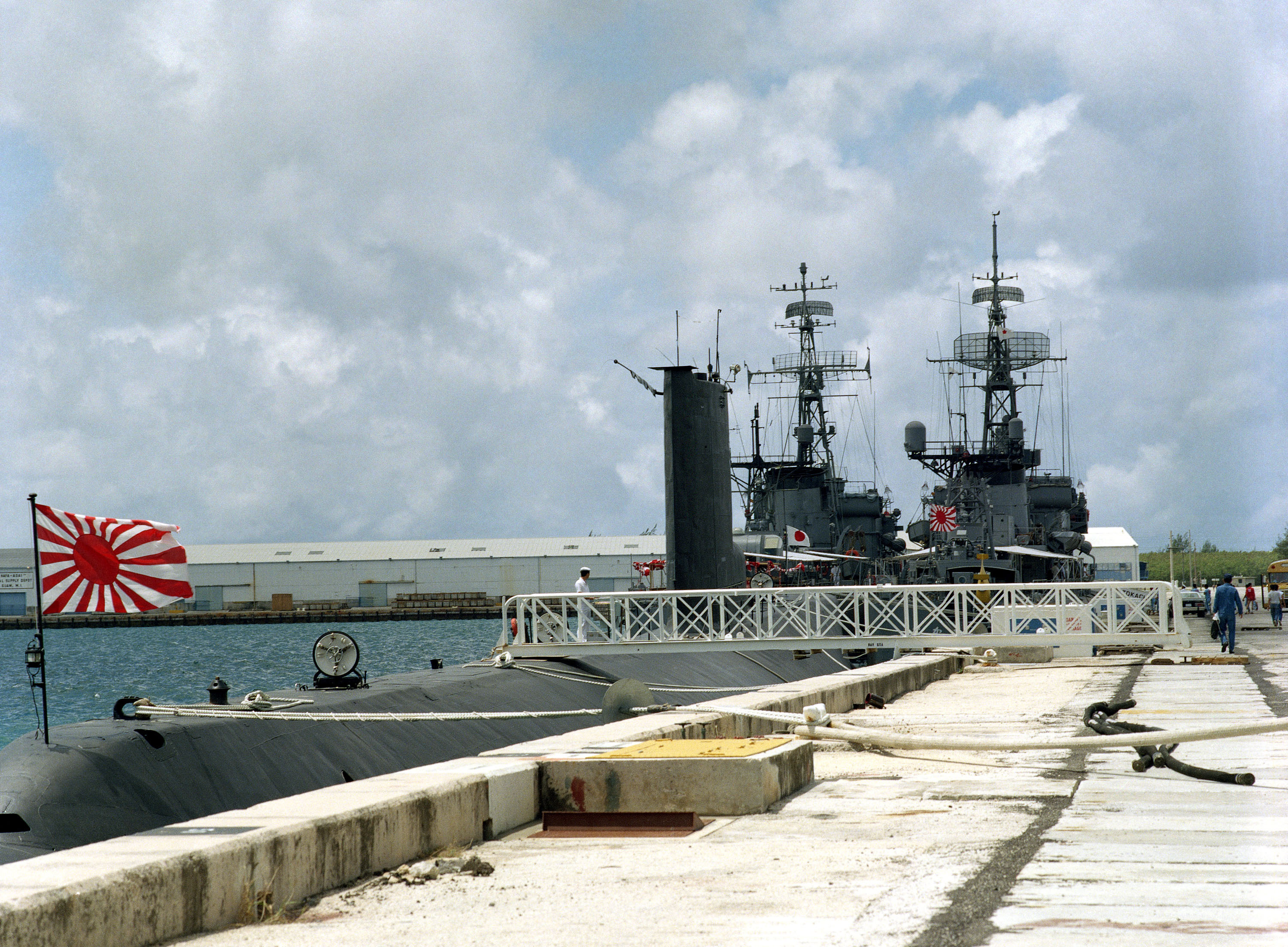
JDS Tokachi, JDS Arashio and JDS Ōi in Apra Harbor on 1 April 1984

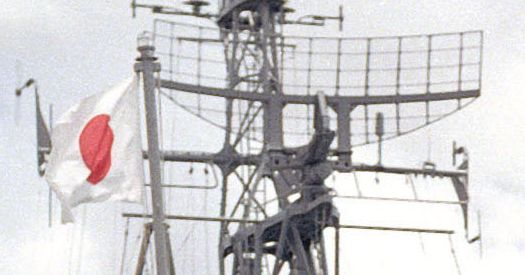
JDS Tokachi's radar OPS-2 on 1 April 1984

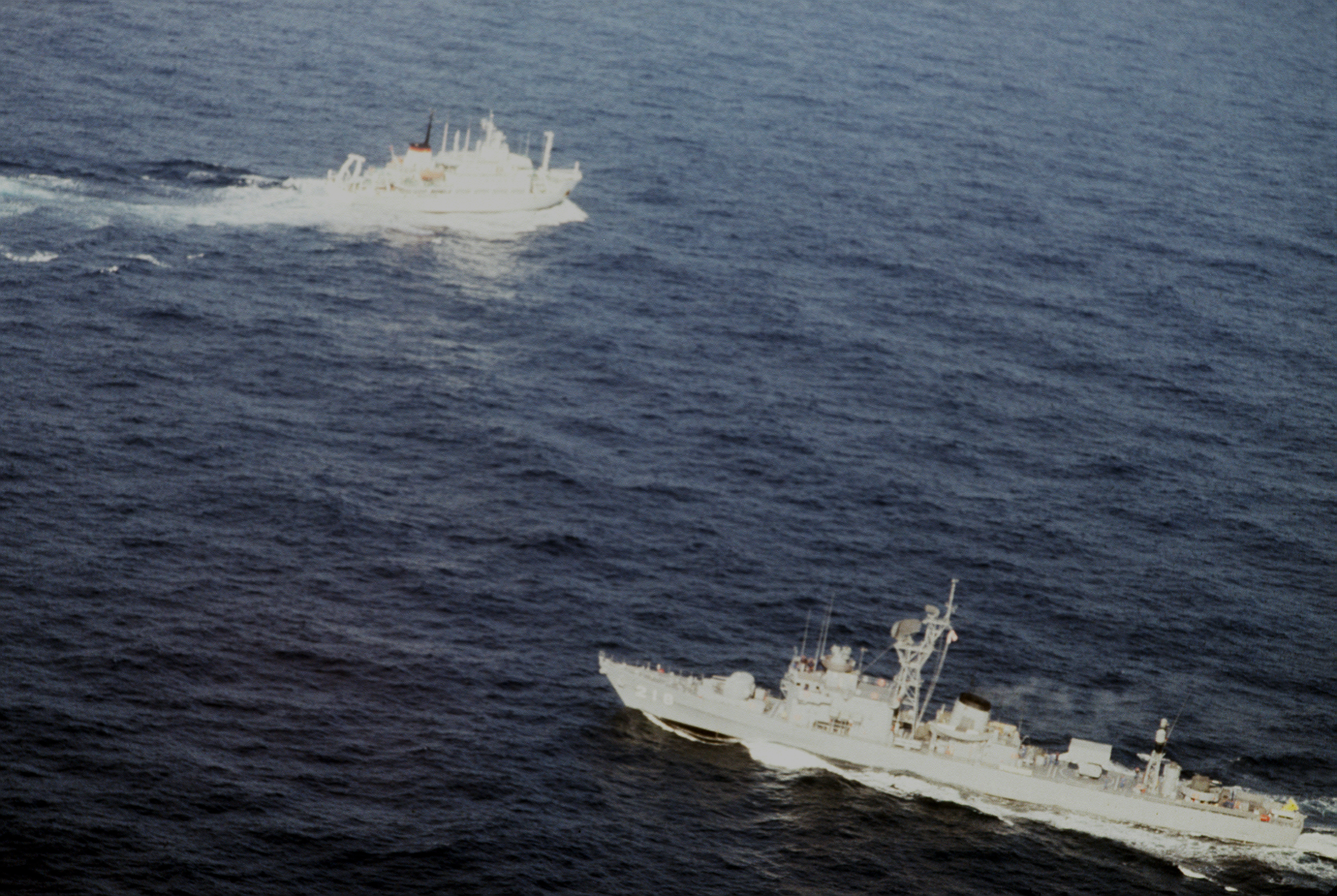
JDS Tokachi on 21 December 1987
