= JDS Chikugo =

Chikugo-class destroyer escort

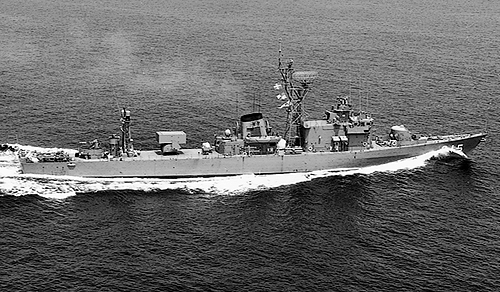
- JS Chikugo

History

Japan
- Name: Chikugo; (ちくご)
- Namesake: Chikugo
- Ordered: 1967
- Builder: Mitsui, Tamano
- Laid down: 9 December 1968
- Launched: 13 January 1970
- Commissioned: 31 July 1971
- Decommissioned: 15 April 1996
- Stricken: 1999
- Home port: Sasebo
- Identification: Pennant number: DE-215
- Fate: Scrapped

General characteristics
- Class & type: Chikugo-class destroyer escort
- Displacement: 1,700–1,800 long tons (1,727–1,829 t) full load
- Length: 93.0 m (305.1 ft)
- Beam: 10.8 m (35 ft)
- Draught: 3.5 m (11 ft)
- Depth: 7.0 metres (23.0 ft)
- Propulsion: CODAD propulsion system; 2 × shafts, 4 × diesel engines (16,000 hp (12,000 kW))
- Speed: 25 knots (46 km/h; 29 mph)
- Range: 5,500 nmi (10,200 km) at 20 kn (37 km/h; 23 mph)
- Complement: 165
- Sensors & processing systems: TDS-1 Target Designation System; OPS-14 2D air search radar; OPS-17 surface search radar; FCS-1B gun FCS; OQS-3A bow sonar; SQS-35(J) VDS; SFCS-4 Underwater Battery FCS
- Electronic warfare & decoys: NOLR-1B ESM; NOLR-5 ESM
- Armament: 2 × 3"/50 caliber guns; 2 × 40 mm AA guns; 1 × ASROC ASW missile launcher; 2 × triple 324 mm ASW torpedo tubes

JDS Chikugo (DE-215) was the lead ship of Chikugo-class destroyer escort of the Japan Maritime Self-Defense Force.

== Development and design ==
The Chikugo class was designed as a modified variant of the Isuzu class, the preceding destroyer escort class. The main anti-submarine weapon was changed from the M/50 375 mm (14.8 in) ASW rocket launcher to the ASROC Anti-submarine missile. The octuple launcher for ASROC was stationed at the mid-deck, and the entire ship design was prescribed by this stationing.

== Construction and career ==
Chikugo was laid down on 9 December 1968 at Mitsui Engineering and Shipbuilding, Tamano, and launched on 13 January 1970. She commissioned on 31 July 1971.

On 26 August 1971, the 34th Escort Corps was newly commissioned under the Sasebo District Force, and was incorporated with JDS Mikuma commissioned on the same day.

Removed from the register on 15 April 1995. Since commissioning, she consistently belonged to the Sasebo District Force for about 26 years, and had a total range of 503,405 nautical miles.
