= JDS Chitose =

Chikugo-class destroyer escort

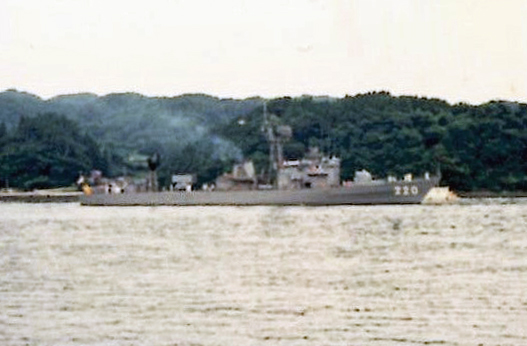
- JDS Chitose

History

Japan
- Name: Chitose; (ちとせ)
- Namesake: Chitose (1936)
- Ordered: 1970
- Builder: Hitachi, Maizuru
- Laid down: 7 October 1970
- Launched: 25 January 1973
- Commissioned: 31 August 1973
- Decommissioned: 13 April 1999
- Home port: Ominato (1973-1982); Yokosuka (1982-1999)
- Identification: Pennant number: DE-220
- Fate: Scrapped

General characteristics
- Class & type: Chikugo-class destroyer escort
- Displacement: 1,700–1,800 long tons (1,727–1,829 t) full load
- Length: 93.0 m (305 ft 1 in)
- Beam: 10.8 m (35 ft 5 in)
- Draught: 3.5 m (11 ft 6 in)
- Depth: 7.0 m (23 ft 0 in)
- Propulsion: CODAD propulsion system; 2 × shafts, 4 × diesel engines (16,000 hp, 12,000 kW)
- Speed: 25 knots (46 km/h; 29 mph)
- Range: 5,500 nmi (10,200 km; 6,300 mi) at 20 kn (37 km/h; 23 mph)
- Complement: 165
- Sensors & processing systems: TDS-1 Target Designation System; OPS-14 2D air search radar; OPS-17 surface search radar; FCS-1B gun FCS; OQS-3A bow sonar; SQS-35(J) VDS; SFCS-4 Underwater Battery FCS
- Electronic warfare & decoys: NOLR-5 ESM
- Armament: 2 × 3"/50 caliber guns; 2 × 40 mm AA guns; 1 × ASROC ASW missile launcher; 2 × triple 324 mm ASW torpedo tubes

JDS Chitose (DE-220) was the sixth ship of the Chikugo-class destroyer escorts of Japan Maritime Self-Defense Force.

== Development and design ==
The Chikugo class was designed as the modified variant of the Isuzu class, the preceding destroyer escort class. The main anti-submarine (ASW) weapon was changed from the M/50 375 mm (14.8 in) ASW rocket launcher to the ASROC anti-submarine missile. The octuple launcher for ASROC was stationed at the mid-deck, and the entire ship design was prescribed by this stationing.

== Construction and career ==
Chitose was laid down on 7 October 1970 at Hitachi Zosen Corporation, Maizuru and launched on 25 January 1973. The vessel was commissioned on 31 August 1973 into the 35th Escort Corps of the Ominato District Force.

On March 27, 1982, the 37th Escort Corps was newly formed under the control of the Yokosuka District Force and incorporated with JDS Ayase, and the home port was transferred to Yokosuka.

Engaged in disaster dispatch activities due to the Miyakejima eruption in October 1983.

Engaged in disaster relief activities due to the eruption of Mt. Mihara, Izu Oshima in November 1986.

Participated in the 57th Shimoda Kurofune Festival held on May 16, 1996, with USS Curts.

Transferred to the 33rd Escort Corps of the Yokosuka District Force on August 1, 1996.

On February 4, 1997, she was involved in the search for a ship in distress off the coast of Inubōsaki, Chiba Prefecture, along with JS Amagiri.

Removed from the register on April 13, 1999. During his 25 years and 7 months commissioning, she participated in surveillance missions 32 times, Guam-Philippines maritime training 6 times, and the Self-Defense Forces observing ceremony 4 times. The total itinerary was about 532,700 nautical miles, about 25 laps of the Earth, and about one and a half round trips when converted to the distance to the Moon.

== Gallery ==
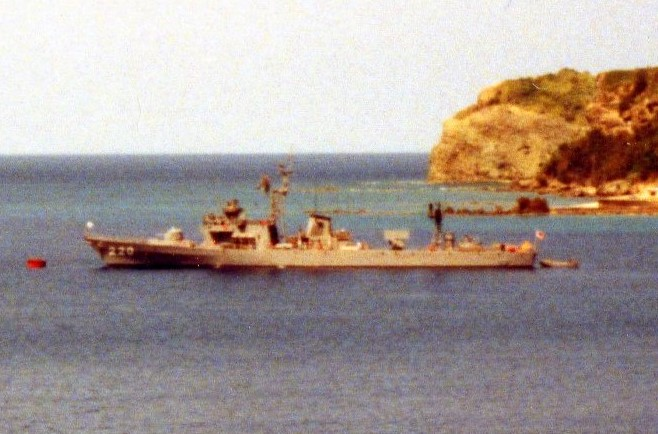
JDS Chitose, date unknown.
