= JDS Isuzu =

Isuzu-class destroyer escort

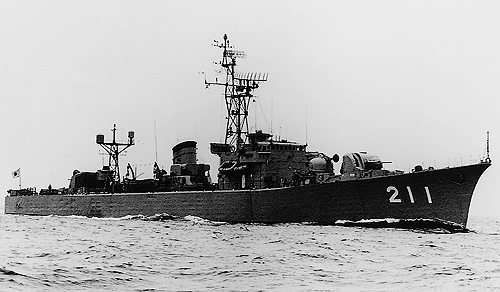
- JDS Isuzu

History

Japan
- Name: Isuzu; (いすず)
- Ordered: 1953
- Builder: Mitsui, Tamano
- Laid down: 16 April 1960
- Launched: 17 January 1961
- Commissioned: 29 July 1961
- Decommissioned: 8 April 1988
- Stricken: 25 March 1995
- Home port: Maizuru
- Identification: Pennant number: DE-211, ASU-7015
- Fate: Scrapped

General characteristics
- Class & type: Isuzu-class destroyer escort
- Displacement: 1,490 long tons (1,514 t) standard; 1,700 long tons (1,727 t) full load
- Length: 94.0 ft (28.7 m)
- Beam: 10.2 ft (3.1 m)
- Draught: 3.5 ft (1.1 m)
- Depth: 7.0 ft (2.1 m)
- Propulsion: Diesel engines, 2 shafts
- Speed: 25 knots (46 km/h; 29 mph)
- Complement: 183
- Armament: 4 × 3"/50 caliber Mk.22 guns (Type 57); 1 × Y-gun depth charge throwers; 1 × depth charge rack; 4 × 533 mm torpedo tubes; 1 × Mk.108 ASW rocket launcher; 2 × Mk.2 ASW torpedo racks

JDS Isuzu (DE-211) is the lead ship of the Isuzu-class destroyer escorts of the Japan Maritime Self-Defense Force (JMSDF).

== Development and design ==
This class was the first JMSDF surface combatant adopted shelter-deck design. Propulsion systems varied in each vessel because the JMSDF tried to find the best method in propulsion systems for future destroyer escorts (DEs). The design concept of this class and the CODAD propulsion system of the Kitakami class became the prototype for later DEs and destroyers such as the Chikugo class and the Yamagumo class.

The gun system was a scaled-down version of the Ayanami class, incorporating four 3"/50 caliber Mark 22 guns in two Mark 33 dual mounts controlled by a Mark 63 GFCS. The main air-search radar was an OPS-2, a Japanese variant of the American AN/SPS-12.

== Construction and career ==
Isuzu was laid down on 16 April 1960 at Mitsui Engineering and Shipbuilding, Tamano and launched on 17 January 1961. The vessel commissioned on 29 July 1961 and was incorporated into the Maizuru District Force with JDS Mogami on 20 December 1961.

Modernization work was carried out from 15 October 1974 to 5 February 1975, and the Mk.108 anti-submarine rocket launcher and Mk.2 short torpedo launcher were removed, and the Type 71 Bofors rocket launcher and Type 68 triple short torpedo launcher were equipped.

On 8 April 1988, the type was changed to a special service ship, the ship registration number was changed to ASU-7015, and it was transferred to the Maizuru District Force as a ship under direct control. The long torpedo launcher was removed during the modernization work to the special service ship. She was stricken on 25 March 1995.
