= JDS Kitakami =

Isuzu-class destroyer escort

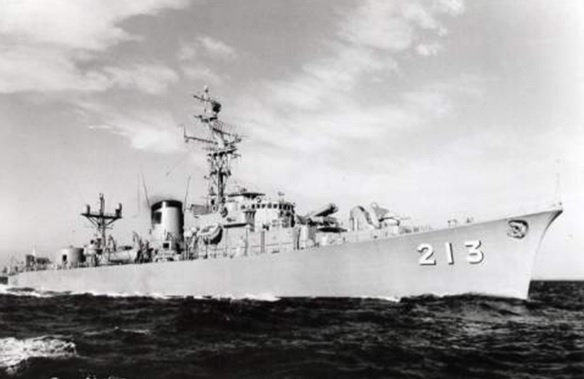
- JDS Kitakami

History

Japan
- Name: Kitakami; (きたかみ)
- Namesake: Kitakami
- Ordered: 1960
- Builder: IHI, Tokyo
- Laid down: 7 July 1962
- Launched: 21 June 1963
- Commissioned: 27 February 1964
- Decommissioned: 31 January 1990
- Stricken: 16 November 1993
- Home port: Ominato
- Identification: Pennant number: DE-213, ASU-7016
- Fate: Scrapped

General characteristics
- Class & type: Isuzu-class destroyer escort
- Displacement: 1,490 long tons (1,514 t) standard; 1,700 long tons (1,727 t) full load
- Length: 94.0 ft (28.7 m)
- Beam: 10.2 ft (3.1 m)
- Draught: 3.5 ft (1.1 m)
- Depth: 7.0 ft (2.1 m)
- Propulsion: Diesel engines, 2 shafts
- Speed: 25 knots (46 km/h; 29 mph)
- Complement: 183
- Armament: 4 × 3"/50 caliber Mk.22 guns (Type 57); 1 × Y-gun depth charge throwers; 1 × depth charge rack; 4 × 533mm torpedo tubes; 1 × Bofors M/50 375mm ASW rocket launcher; 2 × Type 68 triple 324mm torpedo tubes

JDS Kitakami (DE-213) is the third ship of Isuzu-class destroyer escort of Japan Maritime Self-Defense Force.

== Development and design ==
This class was the first JMSDF surface combatant adopted shelter-deck design. Propulsion systems varied in each vessel because the JMSDF tried to find the best way in the propulsion systems of future DEs. The design concept of this class and the CODAD propulsion system of the Kitakami-class became the prototype for later DEs and DDKs such as Chikugo-class and Yamagumo-class.

The gun system was a scaled-down version of the Ayanami-class, four 3"/50 caliber Mark 22 guns with two Mark 33 dual mounts controlled by a Mark 63 GFCS. The main air-search radar was a OPS-2, Japanese variant of the American AN/SPS-12.

== Construction and career ==
Kitakami was laid down on 7 July 1962 at IHI Corporation, Tokyo and launched on 21 June 1963. She was commissioned on 27 February 1964 and was incorporated into the Ominato District Force with JDS Ōi.

On 31 January 1990, the 32nd Escort Corps was abolished, the type was changed to a special service ship, and the ship registration number was changed to ASU-7016. Transferred to the Ominato District Force as a ship under direct control. The long torpedo launcher has been removed due to the conversion work to the special service ship.

She was stricken on 16 November 1993.
