= JDS Yoshino =

Chikugo-class destroyer escort

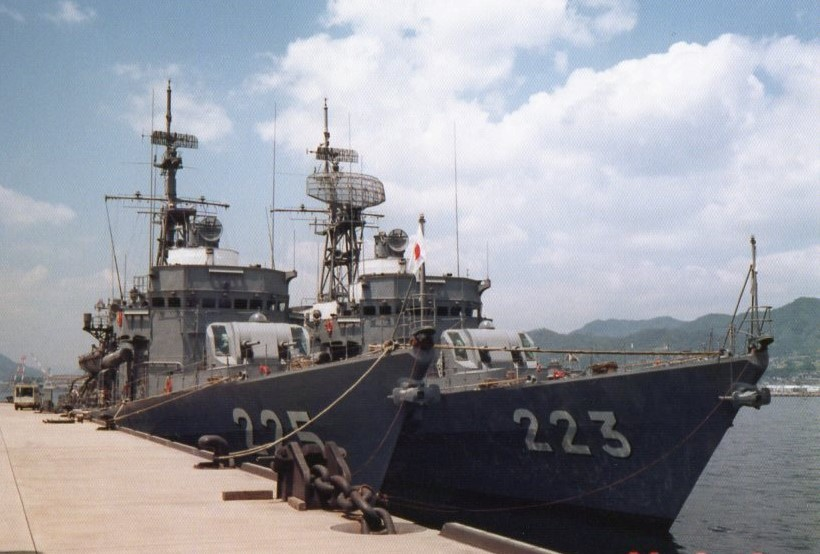
- JDS Yoshino and JDS Noshiro in 1986

History

Japan
- Name: Yoshino; (よしの)
- Namesake: Yoshino
- Ordered: 1972
- Builder: Mitsui, Tamano
- Laid down: 28 September 1973
- Launched: 22 August 1974
- Commissioned: 6 February 1975
- Decommissioned: 15 May 2001
- Home port: Kure (1973-1987); Maizuru (1987-1989); Yokosuka (1989-1995); Kure (1995-2001)
- Identification: Pennant number: DE-223
- Fate: Scrapped

General characteristics
- Class & type: Chikugo-class destroyer escort
- Displacement: 1,700–1,800 long tons (1,727–1,829 t) full load
- Length: 93.0 m (305 ft 1 in)
- Beam: 10.8 m (35 ft 5 in)
- Draught: 3.5 m (11 ft 6 in)
- Depth: 7.0 m (23 ft 0 in)
- Propulsion: CODAD propulsion system; 2 × shafts, 4 × diesel engines (16,000 hp, 12,000 kW)
- Speed: 25 knots (46 km/h; 29 mph)
- Range: 5,500 nmi (10,200 km; 6,300 mi) at 20 kn (37 km/h; 23 mph)
- Complement: 165
- Sensors & processing systems: TDS-1 Target Designation System; OPS-14 2D air search radar; OPS-17 surface search radar; FCS-1B gun FCS; OQS-3A bow sonar; SQS-35(J) VDS; SFCS-4 Underwater Battery FCS
- Electronic warfare & decoys: NOLR-5 ESM
- Armament: 2 × 3"/50 caliber guns; 2 × 40 mm AA guns; 1 × ASROC ASW missile launcher; 2 × triple 324 mm ASW torpedo tubes

JDS Yoshino (DE-223) was the tenth ship of the Chikugo-class destroyer escorts of Japan Maritime Self-Defense Force.

== Development and design ==
The Chikugo class was designed as the modified variant of the Isuzu class, the preceding destroyer escort class. The main anti-submarine (ASW) weapon was changed from the M/50 375 mm (14.8 in) ASW rocket launcher to the ASROC anti-submarine missile. The octuple launcher for ASROC was stationed at the mid-deck, and the entire ship design was prescribed by this stationing.

== Construction and career ==
Yoshino was laid down on 28 September 1973 at Mitsui Engineering & Shipbuilding, Tamano and launched on 22 August 1974. The vessel was commissioned on 6 February 1975 into the 7th Escort Corps of the Kure District Force.

On 11 May 1976, the 7th Escort Corps was renamed the 36th Escort Corps of the Kure District Force.

On 19 March 1986, the 36th Escort Corps was abolished and transferred to the 38th Escort Corps of the Kure District Force.

Joined Maizuru District Force 31st Escort Corps on 1 July 1987. The home port was transferred to Maizuru base.

On 29 August 1987, the Soviet Navy Ognevoy-class destroyer Osmotritelny was visually recognized about 55 km northeast of Rebun Island, Hokkaido.

On 12 December 1989, he was transferred to Yokosuka District Force 33rd Escort Corps, and the home port was transferred to Yokosuka.

On 1 August 1995, she was transferred to the 36th Escort Corps of the Kure District Force, and the home port was transferred to Kure again.

Joined the 22nd Escort Corps of the Kure District Force on 24 March 1997.

Removed from the register on 15 May 2001.
