= JDS Mikuma =

Chikugo-class destroyer escort

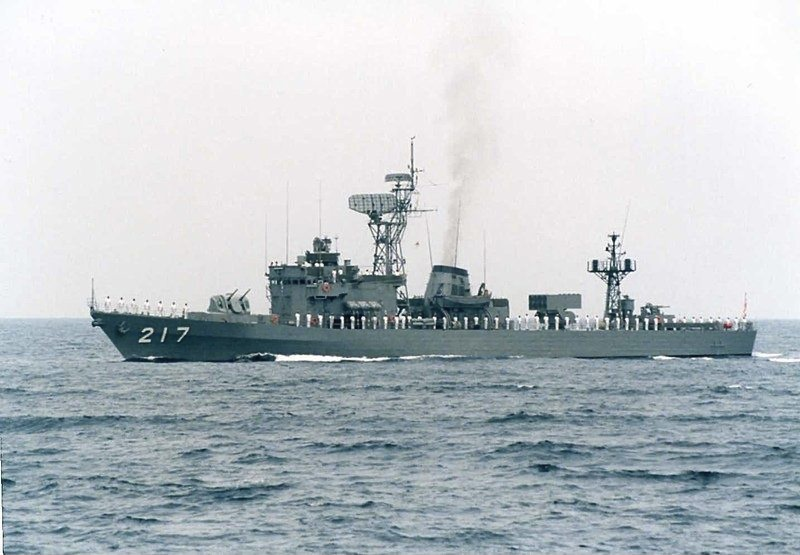
- JDS Mikuma

History

Japan
- Name: Mikuma; (みくま)
- Namesake: Mikuma
- Ordered: 1968
- Builder: Mitsui, Osaka
- Laid down: 17 March 1970
- Launched: 16 February 1971
- Commissioned: 26 August 1971
- Decommissioned: 8 July 1997
- Home port: Sasebo
- Identification: Pennant number: DE-217
- Fate: Scrapped

General characteristics
- Class & type: Chikugo-class destroyer escort
- Displacement: 1,700–1,800 long tons (1,727–1,829 t) full load
- Length: 93.0 m (305 ft 1 in)
- Beam: 10.8 m (35 ft 5 in)
- Draught: 3.5 m (11 ft 6 in)
- Depth: 7.0 m (23 ft 0 in)
- Propulsion: CODAD propulsion system; 2 × shafts, 4 × diesel engines (16,000 hp, 12,000 kW)
- Speed: 25 knots (46 km/h; 29 mph)
- Range: 5,500 nmi (10,200 km; 6,300 mi) at 20 kn (37 km/h; 23 mph)
- Complement: 165
- Sensors & processing systems: TDS-1 Target Designation System; OPS-14 2D air search radar; OPS-17 surface search radar; FCS-1B gun FCS; OQS-3A bow sonar; SQS-35(J) VDS; SFCS-4 Underwater Battery FCS
- Electronic warfare & decoys: NOLR-5 ESM
- Armament: 2 × 3"/50 caliber guns; 2 × 40 mm AA guns; 1 × ASROC ASW missile launcher; 2 × triple 324 mm ASW torpedo tubes

JDS Mikuma (DE-217) was the third ship of the Chikugo-class destroyer escorts of Japan Maritime Self-Defense Force.

== Development and design ==
The Chikugo class was designed as the modified variant of the Isuzu class, the preceding destroyer escort class. The main anti-submarine (ASW) weapon was changed from the M/50 375 mm (14.8 in) ASW rocket launcher to the ASROC anti-submarine missile. The octuple launcher for ASROC was stationed at the mid-deck, and the entire ship design was prescribed by this stationing.

== Construction and career ==
Mikuma was laid down on 17 March 1970 at Mitsui Engineering & Shipbuilding, Osaka and launched on 16 February 1971. The vessel was commissioned on 26 August 1971 into the 34th Escort Corps of the Sasebo District Force with JDS Chikugo.

She joined the 23rd Sasebo District Force Escort Corps on March 24, 1997.

Mikuma was decommissioned on 8 JUly 1997 with the total itinerary during commissioning of 501,738.1 nautical miles.
