= JDS Ōi =

Isuzu-class destroyer escort

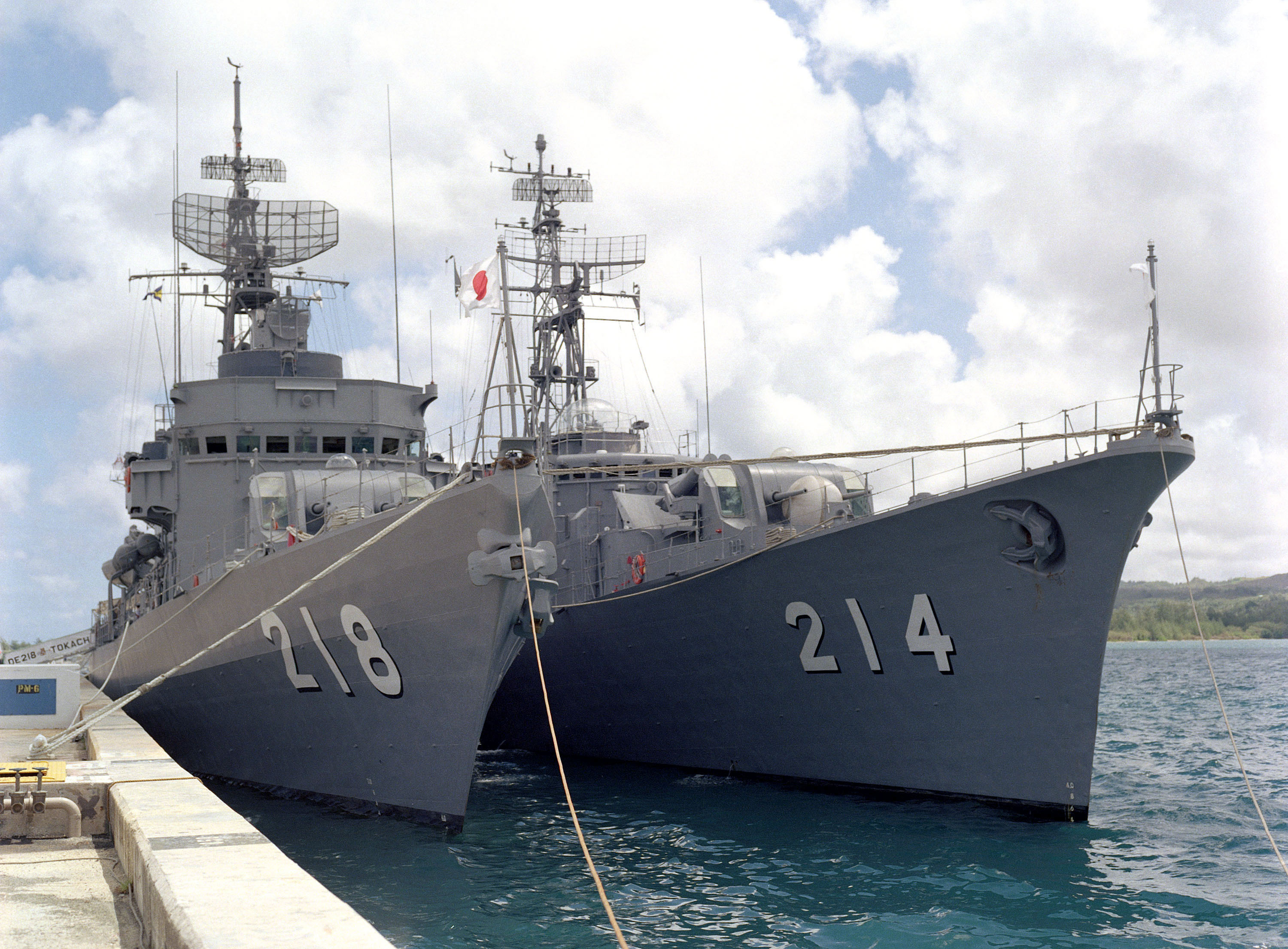
- JDS Ōi and JDS Tokachi in Apra Harbor on 1 April 1984

History

Japan
- Name: Ōi; (おおい)
- Namesake: Ōi
- Ordered: 1960
- Builder: Hitachi, Osaka
- Laid down: 10 July 1962
- Launched: 15 June 1963
- Commissioned: 22 January 1964
- Decommissioned: 31 January 1990
- Stricken: 15 February 1993
- Home port: Ominato
- Identification: Pennant number: DE-214, ASU-7017
- Fate: Scrapped

General characteristics
- Class & type: Isuzu-class destroyer escort
- Displacement: 1,490 long tons (1,514 t) standard; 1,700 long tons (1,727 t) full load
- Length: 94.0 m (308.4 ft)
- Beam: 10.2 m (33 ft)
- Draught: 3.5 m (11 ft)
- Depth: 7.0 m (23.0 ft)
- Propulsion: Diesel engines, 2 shafts
- Speed: 25 knots (46 km/h; 29 mph)
- Complement: 183
- Armament: 4 × 3"/50 caliber Mk.22 guns (Type 57); 1 × Y-gun depth charge throwers; 1 × depth charge rack; 4 × 533mm torpedo tubes; 1 × Bofors M/50 375mm ASW rocket launcher; 2 × Type 68 triple 324mm torpedo tubes

JDS Ōi (DE-214) is the fourth ship of Isuzu-class destroyer escort of the Japan Maritime Self-Defense Force.

== Development and design ==
This class was the first JMSDF surface combatant that adopted a shelter-deck design. Propulsion systems varied in each vessel because the JMSDF tried to find the most effective propulsion systems for future DEs. The design concept of this class and the CODAD propulsion system of the Kitakami-class became the prototype for later classes of DEs and DDKs, such as Chikugo-class and Yamagumo-class.

The gun system was a scaled-down version of the Ayanami-class, four 3"/50 caliber Mark 22 guns with two Mark 33 dual mounts controlled by a Mark 63 GFCS. The main air-search radar was an OPS-2, a Japanese variant of the American AN/SPS-12.

== Construction and career ==
Ōi was laid down on 10 July 1962 at Hitachi Zosen Corporation, Osaka and launched on 15 June 1963. She was commissioned on 22 January, 1964, and was incorporated into the Ominato District Force with JDS Kitakami.

On 31 January 1990, the 32nd Escort Corps was abolished, and the ship’s classification was changed to a special service ship, with the registration number being changed to ASU-7017. It was then transferred to the Ominato District Force as a ship under direct control. The long torpedo launcher was removed due to the conversion work to the special service ship.

She was stricken on 15 February 1993.
