= JS Kumano =

Japanese Mogami-class frigate

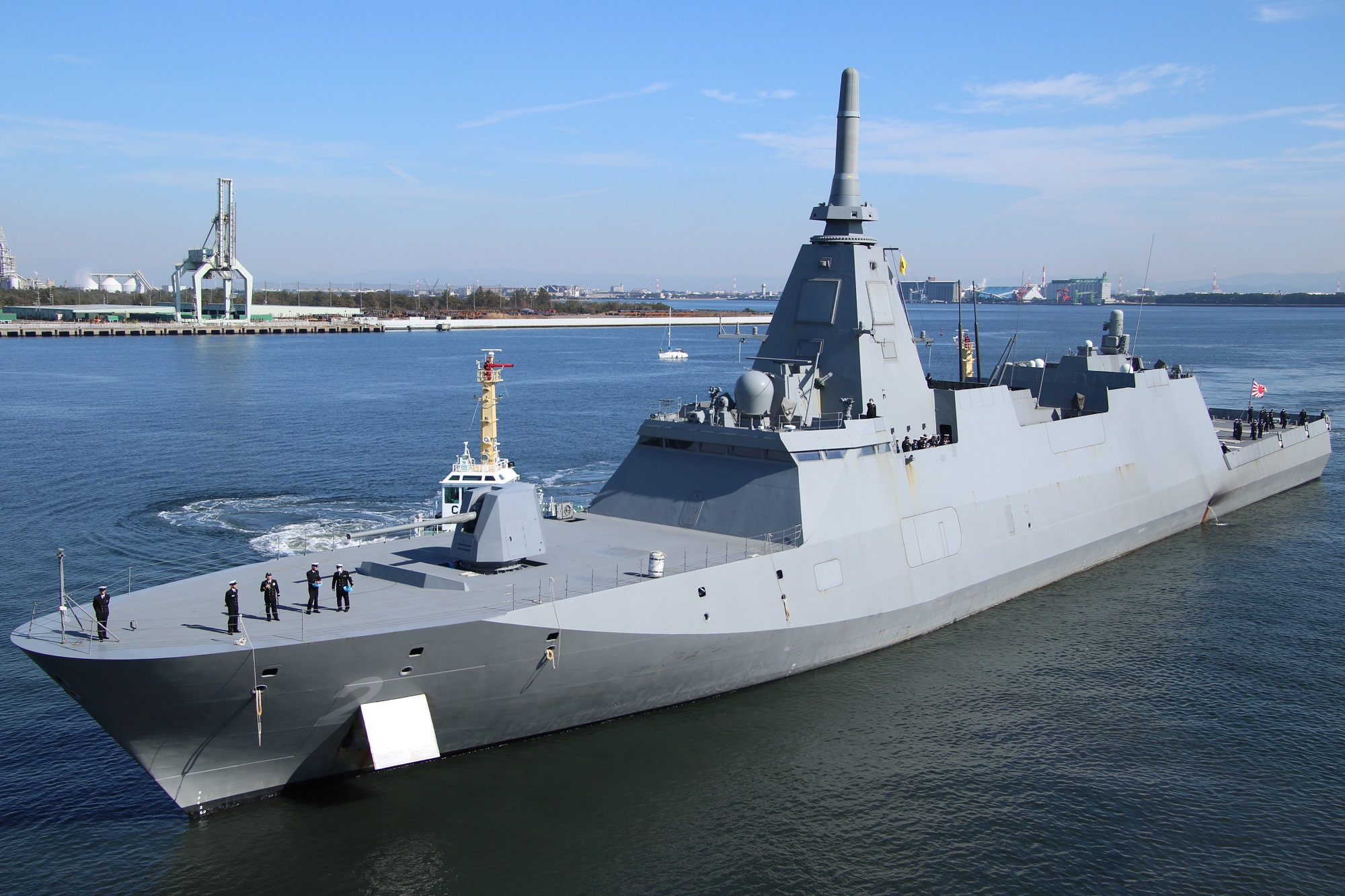
- JS Kumano in 2024

History

Japan
- Name: Kumano; (くまの)
- Namesake: Kumano
- Ordered: 2018
- Builder: Mitsui, Tamano
- Laid down: 30 October 2019
- Launched: 19 November 2020
- Commissioned: 22 March 2022
- Identification: Pennant number: FFM-2
- Status: Active

General characteristics
- Class & type: Mogami-class frigate
- Displacement: 3,900 tons standard; 5,500 tons full load
- Length: 130 m (426 ft 6 in)
- Beam: 16 m (52 ft 6 in)
- Propulsion: CODAG; 1 × Rolls-Royce MT30 gas turbine; 2 × MAN Diesel V28/33DD STC engine
- Speed: over 30 knots (56 km/h; 35 mph)
- Boats & landing craft carried: 2 × RHIB, UUV, USV
- Crew: 90
- Sensors & processing systems: OPY-2 (X-band multi-purpose AESA radar); OAX-3(EO/IR); OQQ-25 (VDS + TASS); OQQ-11 (Mine-hunting sonar); OYQ-1 (Combat management system); OYX-1-29 (Console display system)
- Electronic warfare & decoys: NOLQ-3E (Passive radar system + Electronic attack capability is integrated into the main radar antenna), Chaff dispenser
- Armament: 1 × 5 in (127 mm) Mk-45 Mod 4 naval gun; 2 × missile canisters for a total of 8 Type 17 anti-ship missiles; 1 × SeaRAM; Type 12 torpedoes; Simplified mine laying equipment; 2 × Mk-41 VLS (16 cells total); Naval version of Type 03 Chū-SAM; 2 × Remote weapon station
- Aircraft carried: 1 × SH-60L helicopter
- Aviation facilities: Single hangar

JS Kumano (FFM-2) is the second ship of the Mogami-class frigates of the Japan Maritime Self-Defense Force (JMSDF). She was named after Kumano River and shares her name with a World War II heavy cruiser Kumano and Cold War destroyer escort Kumano.

== Development and design ==
In 2015, the Japanese defense budget allocated funds to study the construction of a new "compact-type hull destroyer with additional multi-functional capabilities" as well as a new radar system for the destroyer. In the same year Mitsubishi Heavy Industries (MHI) unveiled the frigate's first concept model (30FF) which they have been developing with their own funds.

The 30DX design has an overall length of 130 metres (426 ft 6 in), breadth of 16 metres (52 ft 6 in), a standard displacement of 3,900 tons with a full load displacement of about 5,500 tons, and a maximum speed of over 30 knots (56 km/h; 35 mph). Weapons include a Mk 45 gun, two remote weapon stations above the bridge, 16 Mk 41 VLS at the bow, eight anti-ship missiles, one SeaRAM, an SH-60L helicopter, torpedoes and decoy launchers. It can also deploy and recover unmanned underwater vessels, unmanned surface vessels and sea mines from the rear ramp beneath the helideck. It is also expected to use a naval version of the Type 03 Chū-SAM.

== Construction and career ==
Kumano was laid down on 30 October 2019 at Mitsui Engineering and Shipbuilding, Tamano and launched on 19 November 2020. She will be expected to be commissioned in March 2022.

While fitting out, her enclosed antenna was installed on 16 February 2021.

She began sea trials on 24 August 2021 with likely missions of island defense, homeland patrol, and international tours.

Kumano was commissioned on 22 March 2022 and deployed to Yokosuka Naval Base.

When JS Kumano was completed, it was not equipped with VLS, but the budget for VLS will be appropriated later and VLS will be installed.

In March 2026, the ship participated in the Royal Australian Navy's Exercise Kakadu Fleet Review on Sydney Harbour.

== Gallery ==
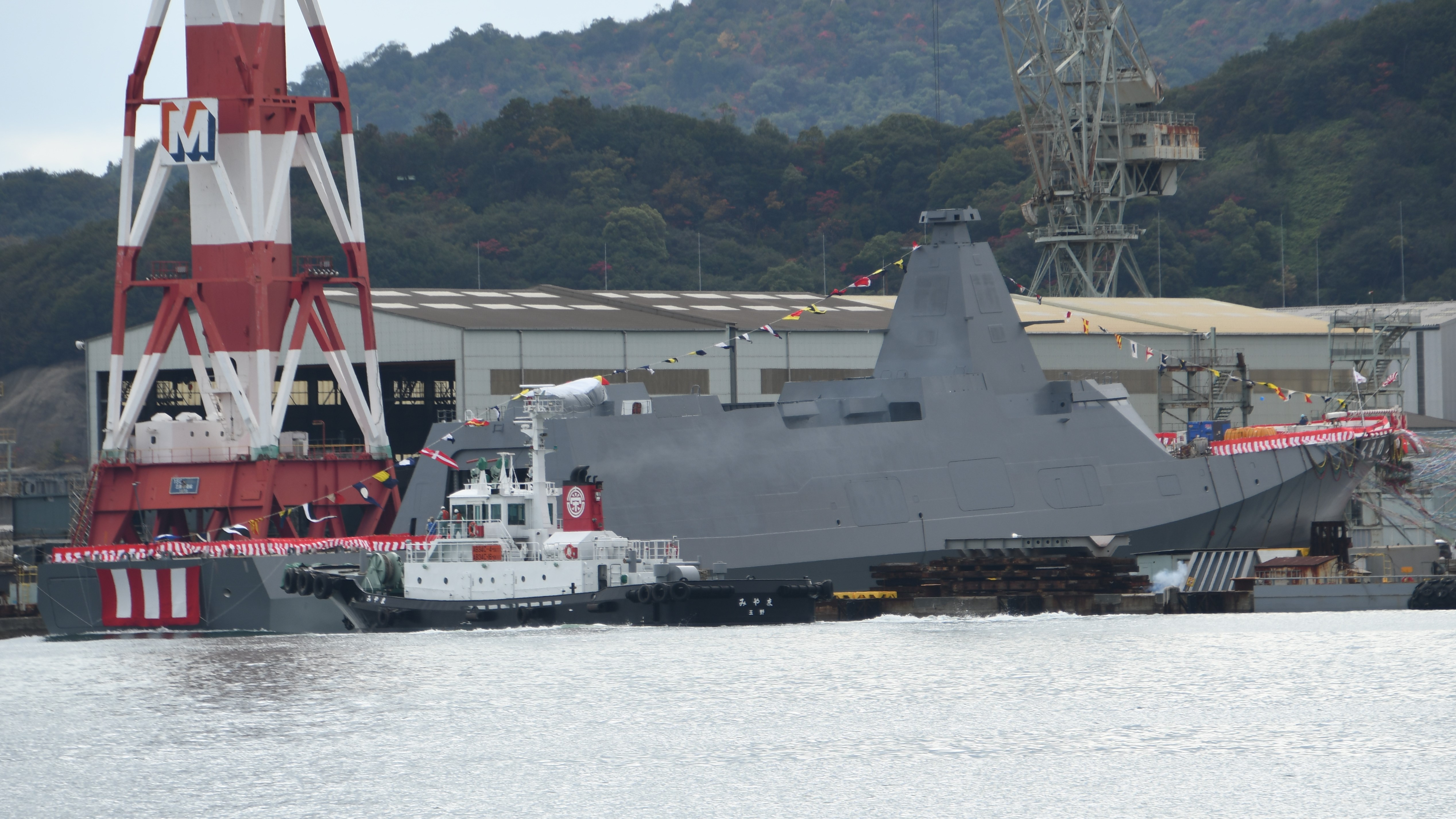
JS Kumano at Mitsui shipyard, Tamano on 19 November 2020.

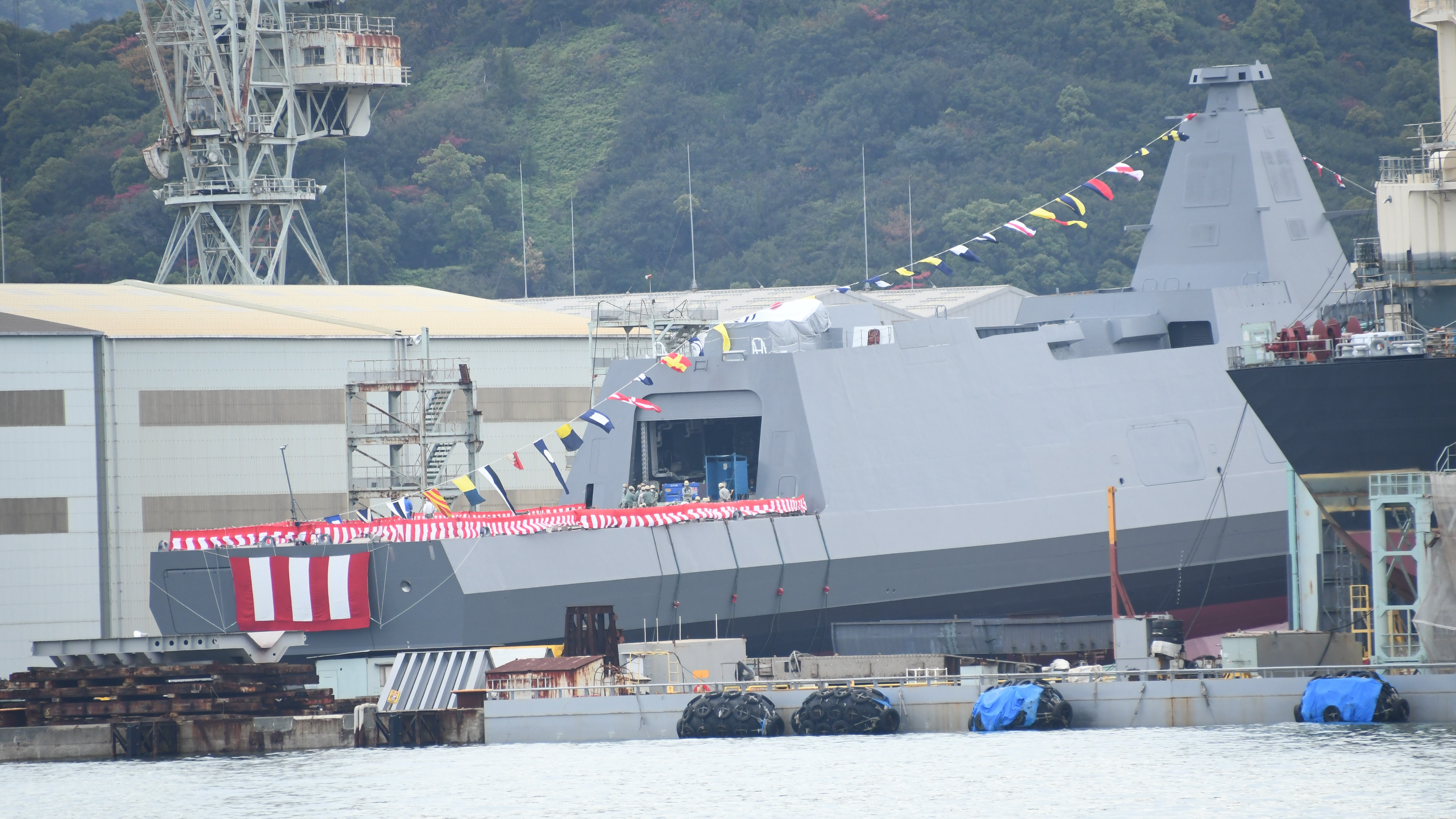
JS Kumano at Mitsui shipyard, Tamano on 19 November 2020.

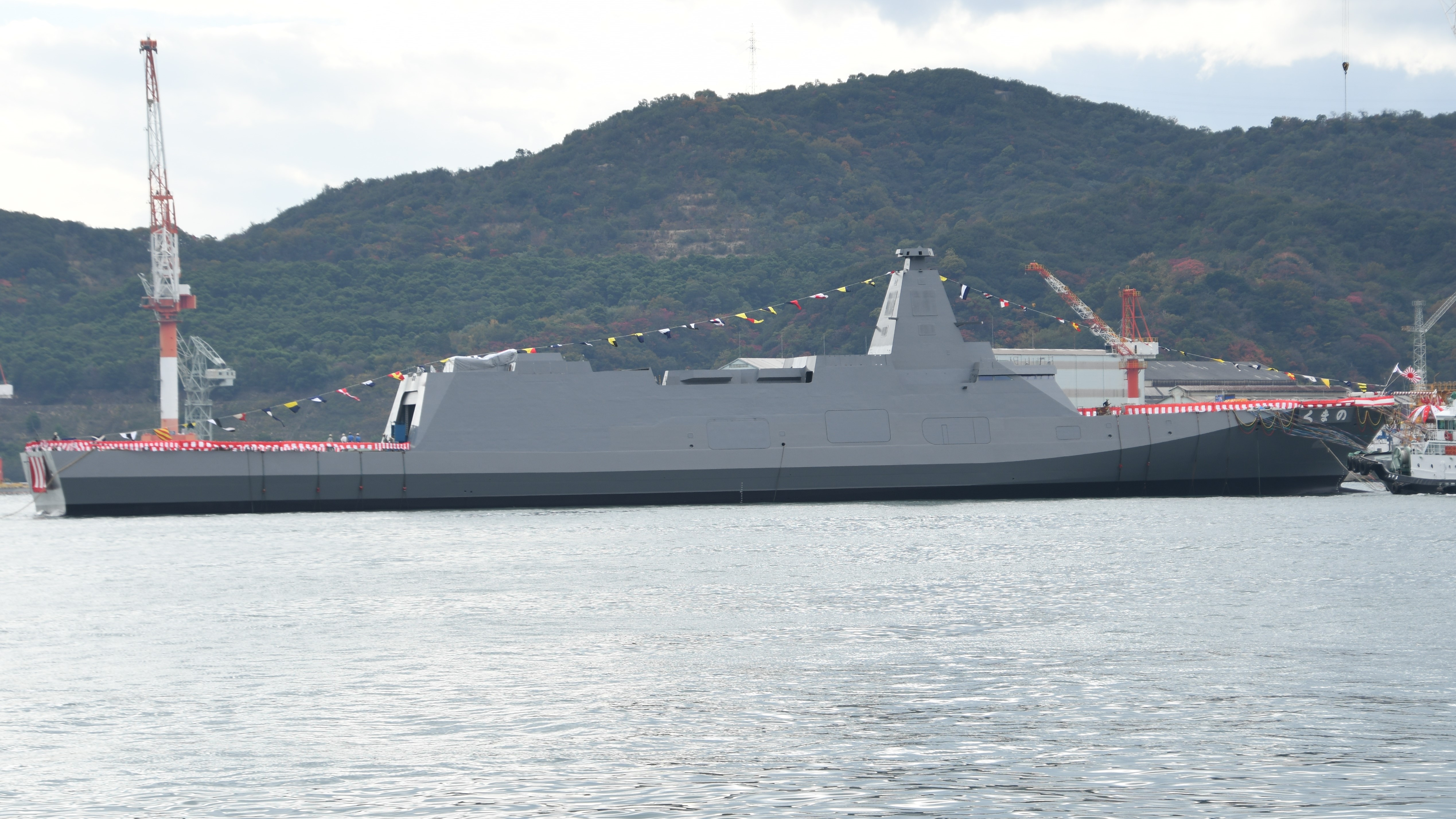
JS Kumano at Mitsui shipyard, Tamano on 19 November 2020.

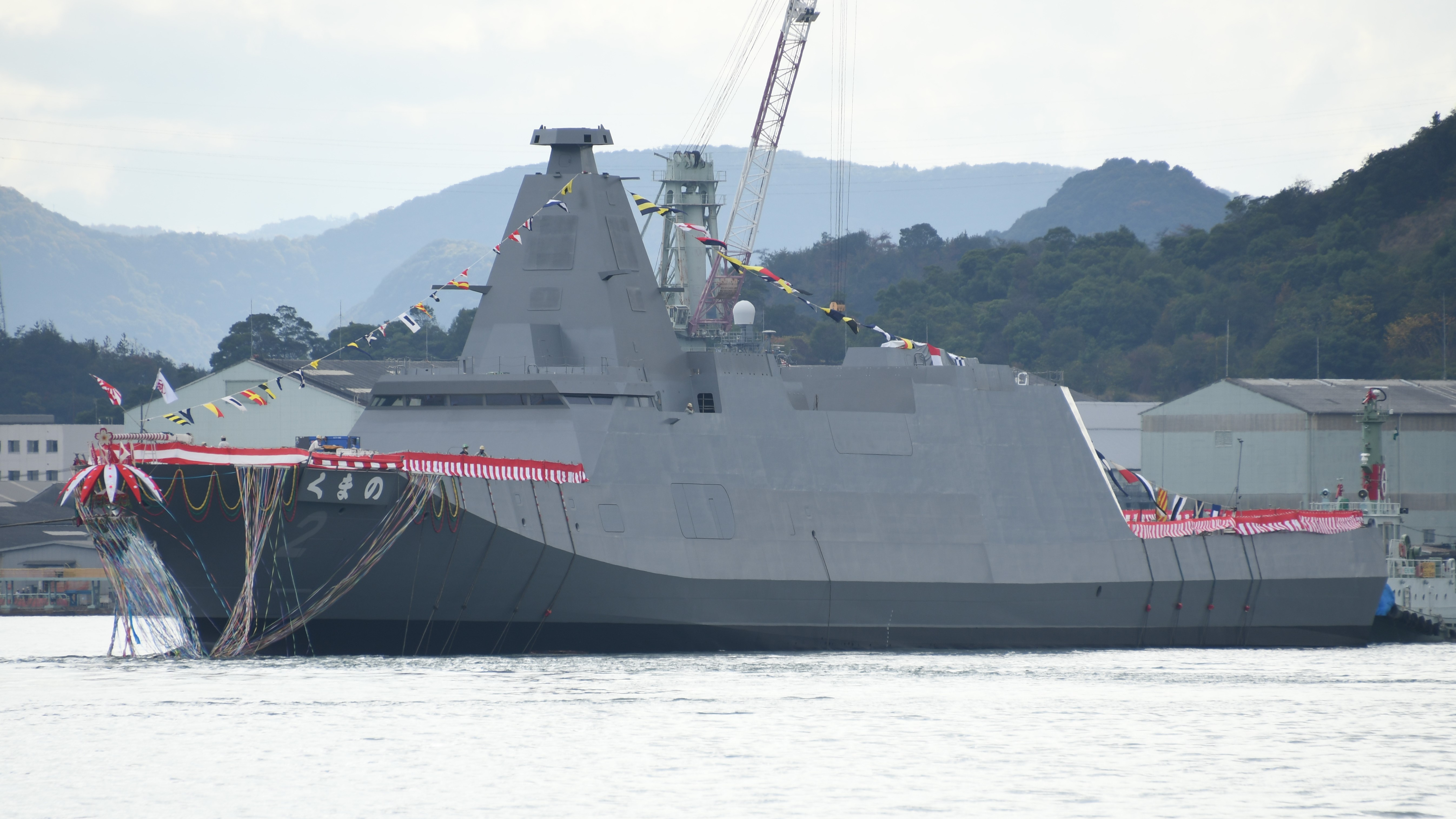
JS Kumano at Mitsui shipyard, Tamano on 19 November 2020

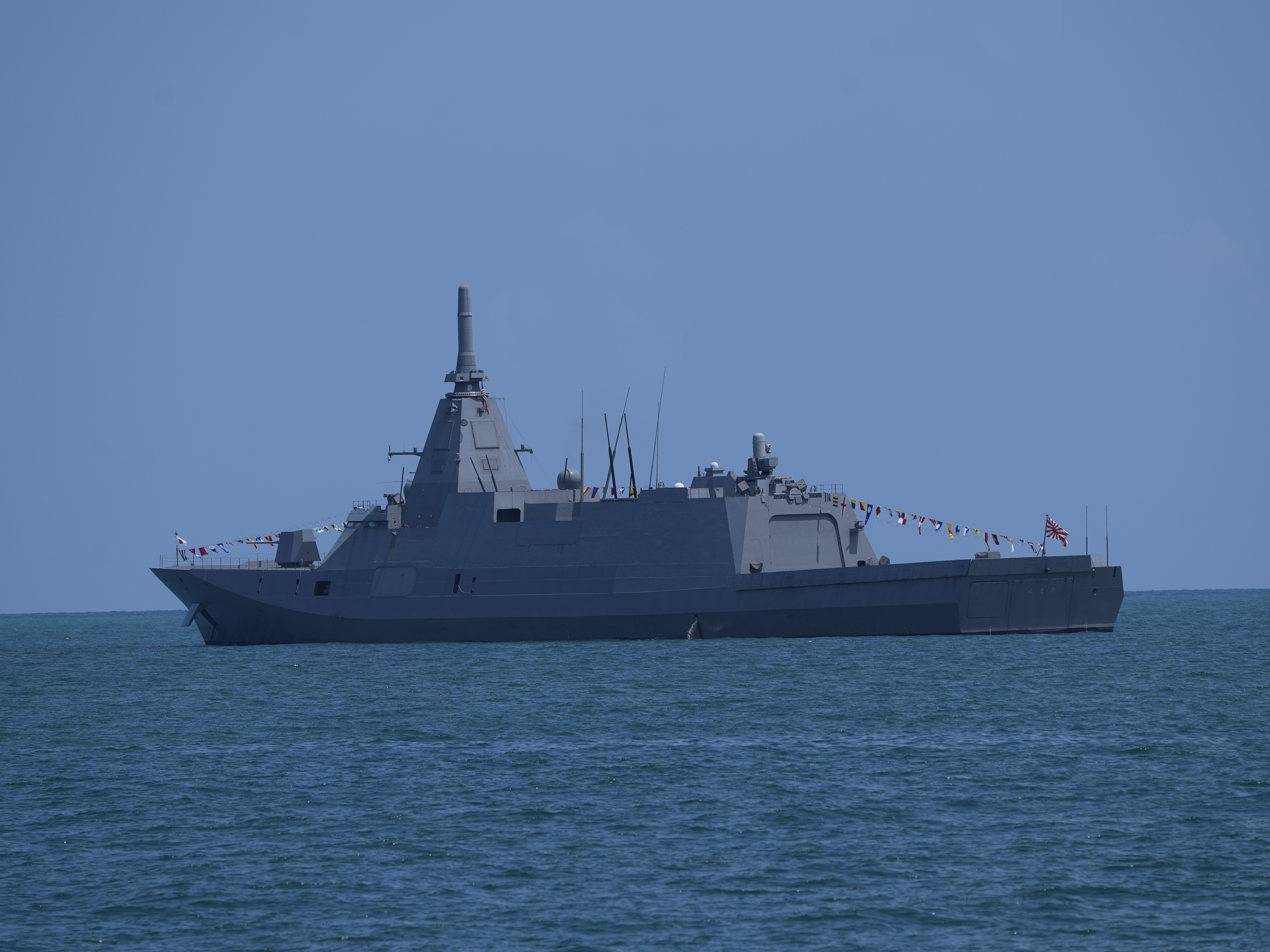
JS Kumano at Langkawi for LIMA 2023

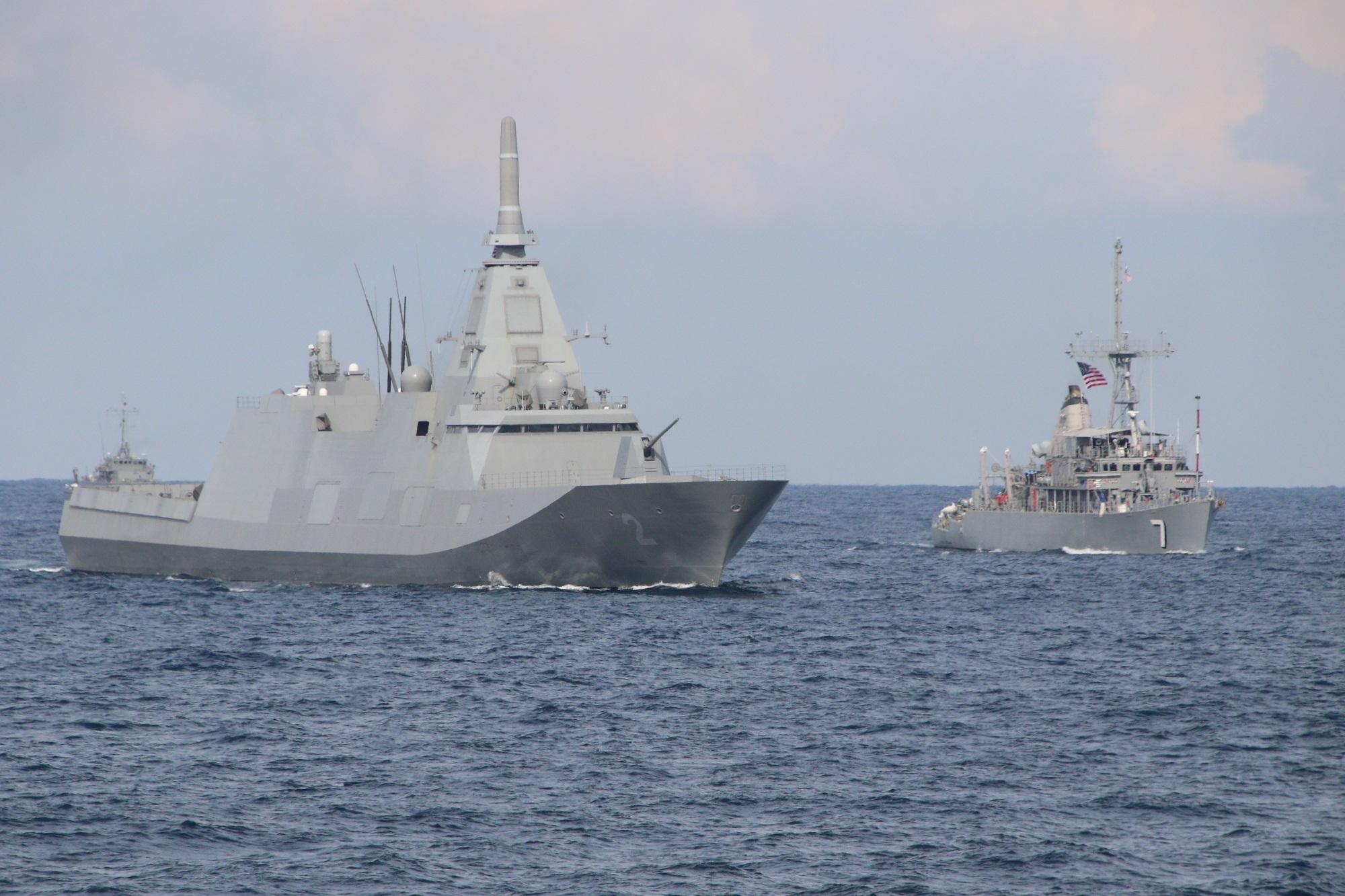
JS Kumano and USS Patriot, 18 November 2023.
