= JDS Kumano =

Chikugo-class destroyer escort

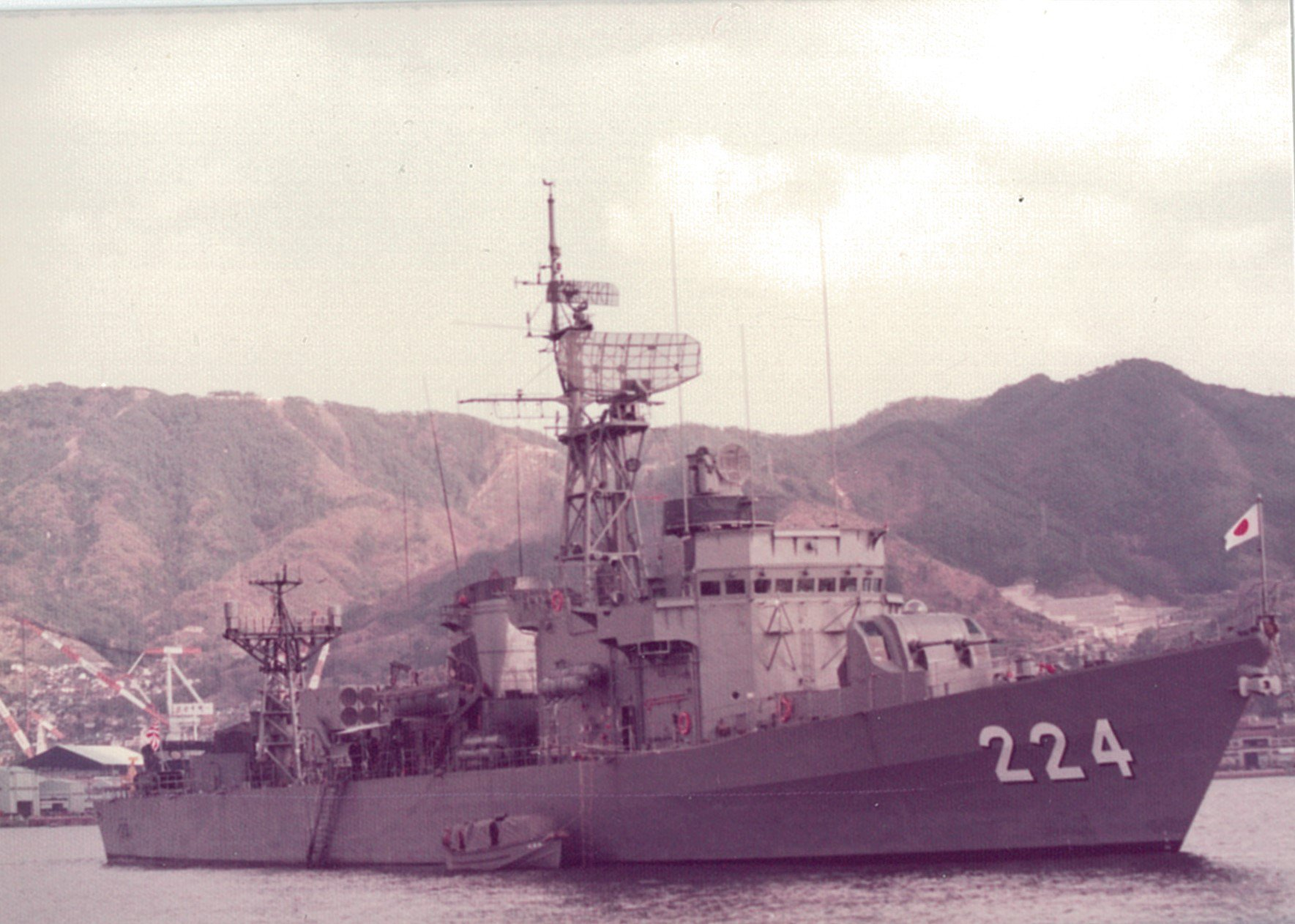
- JDS Kumano

History

Japan
- Name: Kumano; (くまの)
- Namesake: Kumano
- Ordered: 1972
- Builder: Hitachi, Osaka
- Laid down: 29 May 1974
- Launched: 24 February 1975
- Commissioned: 19 November 1975
- Decommissioned: 18 May 2001
- Home port: Kure (1976–1986); Maizuru (1986–1989); Yokosuka (1989–1995); Kure (1995–2001)
- Identification: Pennant number: DE-224
- Fate: Scrapped

General characteristics
- Class & type: Chikugo-class destroyer escort
- Displacement: 1,700–1,800 long tons (1,727–1,829 t) full load
- Length: 93.0 m (305 ft 1 in)
- Beam: 10.8 m (35 ft 5 in)
- Draught: 3.5 m (11 ft 6 in)
- Depth: 7.0 m (23 ft 0 in)
- Propulsion: CODAD propulsion system; 2 × shafts, 4 × diesel engines (16,000 hp, 12,000 kW)
- Speed: 25 knots (46 km/h; 29 mph)
- Range: 5,500 nmi (10,200 km; 6,300 mi) at 20 kn (37 km/h; 23 mph)
- Complement: 165
- Sensors & processing systems: TDS-1 Target Designation System; OPS-14 2D air search radar; OPS-17 surface search radar; FCS-1B gun FCS; OQS-3A bow sonar; SQS-35(J) VDS; SFCS-4 Underwater Battery FCS
- Electronic warfare & decoys: NOLR-5 ESM
- Armament: 2 × 3"/50 caliber guns; 2 × 40 mm AA guns; 1 × ASROC ASW missile launcher; 2 × triple 324 mm ASW torpedo tubes

JDS Kumano (DE-224) was the tenth ship of the Chikugo-class destroyer escorts of Japan Maritime Self-Defense Force.

== Development and design ==
The Chikugo class was designed as the modified variant of the Isuzu class, the preceding destroyer escort class. The main anti-submarine (ASW) weapon was changed from the M/50 375 mm (14.8 in) ASW rocket launcher to the ASROC anti-submarine missile. The octuple launcher for ASROC was stationed at the mid-deck, and the entire ship design was prescribed by this stationing.

== Construction and career ==
Kumano was laid down on 29 May 1974 at Hitachi Zosen Corporation, Osaka and launched on 24 February 1975. The vessel commissioned on 19 November 1975. On 11 May 1976, the 7th Escort Corps was renamed the 36th Escort Corps of the Kure District Force.

On 19 March 1986, Kumano was transferred to Maizuru District Force 31st Escort Corps, and the fixed port was transferred to Maizuru. On 12 December 1989, she was transferred to the 33rd Escort Corps of the Yokosuka District Force, and the fixed port was transferred to Yokosuka.

The destroyer escort performed as host ship for the Chilean sailing training ship Esmeralda which arrived in Tokyo on June 26, 1993. On 12 April 1994, Kumano made exchanges with the French Navy Floréal-class frigate Nivôse which had made a goodwill visit to Yokosuka base. On 1 August 1995, she was transferred to the 36th Kure District Force Escort Corps and transferred to Kure again. Kumano joined the 22nd Escort Corps of the Kure District Force on 24 March 1997.

Kumano was decommissioned on 18 May 2001.
