= Chikugo-class destroyer escort =

Japanese naval ship class (1971–2003)

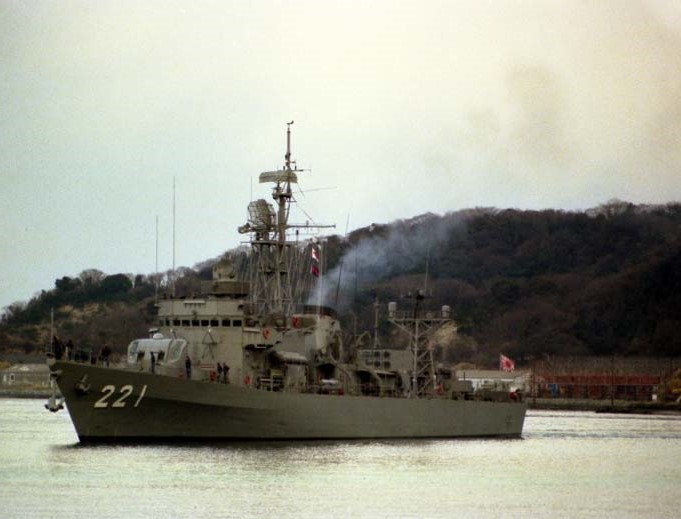
- JDS Niyodo on 16 February 1979

Class overview
- Name: Chikugo class
- Operators: Japan Maritime Self-Defense Force
- Preceded by: Isuzu class
- Succeeded by: Ishikari class
- Built: 1968–1976
- In commission: 1971–2003
- Completed: 11
- Retired: 11

General characteristics
- Type: Destroyer escort
- Displacement: 1,700–1,800 long tons (1,727–1,829 t) full load
- Length: 93.0 m (305.1 ft)
- Beam: 10.8 m (35 ft)
- Draught: 3.5 m (11 ft)
- Depth: 7.0 metres (23.0 ft)
- Propulsion: CODAD propulsion system; 2 × shafts, 4 × diesel engines (16,000 hp (12,000 kW))
- Speed: 25 knots (46 km/h; 29 mph)
- Range: 5,500 nmi (10,200 km) at 20 kn (37 km/h; 23 mph)
- Complement: 165
- Sensors & processing systems: TDS-1 Target Designation System; OPS-14 2D air search radar; OPS-17 surface search radar; FCS-1B gun FCS; OQS-3A bow sonar; SQS-35(J) VDS; SFCS-4 Underwater Battery FCS
- Electronic warfare & decoys: NOLR-1 ESM (Earlier batch); NOLR-5 ESM (Latter batch)
- Armament: 2 × 3"/50 caliber guns; 2 × 40 mm AA guns; 1 × ASROC ASW missile launcher; 2 × triple 324 mm ASW torpedo tubes

The Chikugo-class destroyer escort (or frigate) was a class of destroyer escorts built by the Japanese Maritime Self-Defense Force as the successor of the Isuzu class, with the same ASW mission. This class was followed by JDS Ishikari. This is the first Japanese destroyer escort class to carry ASROC anti-submarine missiles.

The class entered service with Chikugo in 1971. Eleven ships were constructed and saw service until the mid-1990s and early 2000s. All vessels in the class were retired with Noshiro being the last to decommission in 2003.

== Design ==
This class was designed as a modified variant of the Isuzu class, the preceding destroyer escort class. The main anti-submarine weapon was changed from the M/50 375 mm (14.8 in) ASW rocket launcher to the ASROC anti-submarine missile. The octuple launcher for ASROC was stationed at the mid-deck, and the entire ship design was prescribed by this stationing. To exploit the range of ASROC, this class was equipped with the long-range low-frequency (5 kHz) bow sonar, OQS-3A (Japanese version of the AN/SQS-23), and in addition, the latter batch had SQS-35(J) Variable Depth Sonar system. These anti-submarine sensors and weapons could be compared with those of destroyers in the main fleet of this age, such as Minegumo class and Yamagumo class.

In contrast to their anti-submarine capability, the anti-aircraft fire power was weakened compared to the preceding class. The foredeck gun was a Type 68 3"/50 caliber twin cannon controlled by a FCS-1B Gun Fire Control System, which was standard anti-air weapon system in the JMSDF of this age. But the afterdeck gun was the old-fashioned Bofors 40 mm L/60 twin cannon, lacking the anti-ship missile defense (ASMD) capability. The final batch of this class was planned to be equipped with the new Oerlikon 35 mm twin cannon, but this plan was frustrated because of the budgetary consideration.

== Ships in the class ==
Hull no.	Name	Laid down	Launched	Commissioned	Decommissioned
DE-215	Chikugo	December 9, 1968	January 13, 1970	July 31, 1971	April 15, 1996
DE-216	Ayase	December 5, 1969	September 16, 1970	May 20, 1971	August 1, 1996
DE-217	Mikuma	March 17, 1970	February 16, 1971	August 26, 1971	July 8, 1997
DE-218	Tokachi	December 11, 1970	November 25, 1971	May 17, 1972	April 15, 1998
DE-219	Iwase	August 6, 1971	June 29, 1972	December 12, 1972	October 16, 1998
DE-220	Chitose	October 7, 1971	January 25, 1973	August 31, 1973	April 13, 1999
DE-221	Niyodo	September 20, 1972	August 28, 1973	February 28, 1974	June 24, 1999
DE-222	Teshio	July 11, 1973	May 29, 1974	January 10, 1975	June 27, 2000
DE-223	Yoshino	September 28, 1973	August 22, 1974	February 6, 1975	May 15, 2001
DE-224	Kumano	May 29, 1974	February 24, 1975	November 19, 1975	May 18, 2001
DE-225	Noshiro	January 27, 1976	December 23, 1976	June 30, 1977	March 13, 2003
