= Isuzu-class destroyer escort =

Japanese naval ship class (1961–1993)

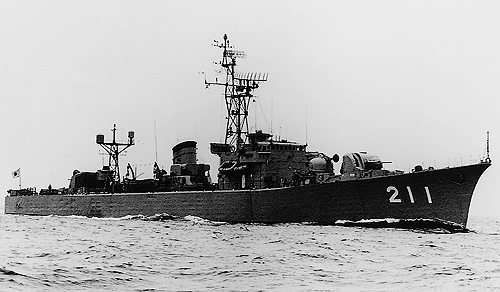
- JS Isuzu

Class overview
- Name: Isuzu class
- Operators: Japan Maritime Self-Defense Force
- Preceded by: Ikazuchi class
- Succeeded by: Chikugo class
- In commission: 1961–1993
- Completed: 4
- Retired: 4

General characteristics
- Type: Destroyer escort
- Displacement: 1,490 long tons (1,514 t) standard; 1,700 long tons (1,727 t) full load
- Length: 94.0 m (308 ft 5 in)
- Beam: 10.2 m (33 ft 6 in)
- Draught: 3.5 m (11 ft 6 in)
- Depth: 7.0 m (23 ft 0 in)
- Propulsion: Diesel engines, 2 shafts
- Speed: 25 knots (46 km/h; 29 mph)
- Complement: 183
- Sensors & processing systems: Mark 63 fire-control system
- Armament: 4 × 3 in/50 cal. Mk.22 guns (Type 57); 1 × Y-gun depth charge throwers; 1 × depth charge rack; 4 × 533 mm torpedo tubes; Earlier batch (DE-211, 212); 1 × Mk.108 ASW rocket launcher; 2 × Mk.2 ASW torpedo racks; Latter batch (DE-213, 214); 1 × Bofors M/50 375 mm ASW rocket launcher; 2 × Type 68 triple 324 mm torpedo tubes

The Isuzu-class destroyer escorts were four destroyer escorts (or frigates) built for the Japan Maritime Self-Defense Force (JMSDF) in the early 1960s. The latter two (Kitakami and Ōi) were quite different from the earlier two vessels in their propulsion and weaponry, so sometimes they were classified as the "Kitakami class".

== Design ==
This class was the first JMSDF surface combatant adopted shelter-deck design. Propulsion systems varied in each vessel because the JMSDF tried to find the best way in the propulsion systems of future DEs. The design concept of this class and the CODAD propulsion system of the Kitakami class became the prototype for later DEs and DDKs such as Chikugo class and Yamagumo class.

The gun system was a scale-down version of the Ayanami class, four 3-inch/50-caliber Mark 22 guns with two Mark 33 dual mounts controlled by a Mark 63 GFCS. Main air-search radar was a OPS-2, Japanese variant of the American AN/SPS-12.

In the earlier batch, the main anti-submarine warfare (ASW) armament was a Mk.108 Weapon Alpha. The JMSDF desired this American brand-new ASW rocket launcher earnestly, but then, it became clear that it was not as good as it was supposed to be. So in the latter batch, it was changed with a M/50, Swedish 375 mm quadruple ASW rocket launcher. Later, the Weapon Alpha of the earlier batch was also replaced by a Type 71, Japanese version of the M/50.

== Ships ==
Pennant no.	Name	Laid down	Launched	Commissioned	Decommissioned
DE-211	Isuzu		January 17, 1961	July 29, 1961	March 25, 1992
DE-212	Mogami		March 7, 1961	October 28, 1961	June 20, 1991
DE-213	Kitakami		June 21, 1963	February 27, 1964	November 16, 1993
DE-214	Ōi		June 15, 1963	January 22, 1964	February 5, 1993
