= Japanese destroyer Akigumo =

At least two warships of Japan have been named Akigumo:

- Japanese destroyer Akigumo (1941), a Kagerō-class destroyer launched in 1941 and sunk in 1944;
- JDS Akigumo, a Yamagumo-class destroyer launched in 1973 and struck in 2005.
