= Japanese destroyer Yūgumo =

Two warships of Japan have borne the name Yūgumo:

- Japanese destroyer Yūgumo (1941), a Yūgumo-class destroyer launched in 1941 and sunk in 1943.
- JDS Yūgumo, a Yamagumo-class destroyer launched in 1977 and struck in 2005.
