= Japanese destroyer Asagumo =

Two naval vessels of Japan have been named Asagumo (朝雲), which translates to "Morning Clouds".

- Japanese destroyer Asagumo (1937) was an Asashio-class destroyer in the Imperial Japanese Navy. She was launched in 1937, completed in 1938, sunk in 1944, and struck in 1945.
- JDS Asagumo (DD-115) was a Yamagumo-class destroyer in the Japanese Maritime Self-Defense Force. She was launched in 1966 and decommissioned in 1998.
