= JDS Aokumo =

Yamagumo-class destroyer

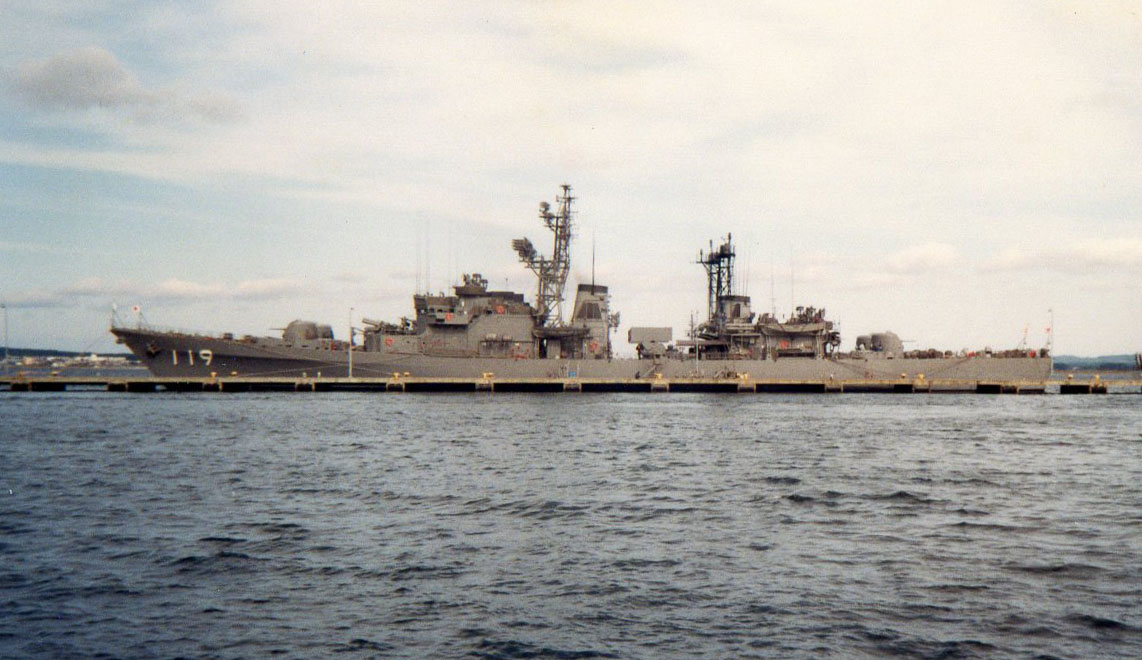
- JDS Aokumo

History

Japan
- Name: Aokumo; (あおくも)
- Ordered: 1969
- Builder: Sumitomo, Uraga
- Laid down: 2 October 1970
- Launched: 20 March 1972
- Commissioned: 25 November 1972
- Decommissioned: 13 June 2003
- Reclassified: TV-3512
- Home port: Kure
- Identification: Pennant number: DD-119
- Fate: Scrapped

General characteristics
- Class & type: Yamagumo-class destroyer
- Displacement: 2,150 long tons (2,185 t) standard
- Length: 115.2 m (377 ft 11 in) overall
- Beam: 11.8 m (38 ft 9 in)
- Draft: 4.0 m (13 ft 1 in)
- Propulsion: 6 × Mitsubishi 12 UEV 30/40N diesels
- Speed: 27 knots (31 mph; 50 km/h)
- Range: 6,000 nmi (11,000 km)
- Complement: 220
- Sensors & processing systems: OQS-3 (Type 66 passive sonar); VDS AN/SQS-35(J)
- Electronic warfare & decoys: OPS-11B, OPS-17
- Armament: 4 × Mk.33 3"/50 caliber guns; 1 × ASROC anti-submarine rocket system; 1 × Bofors 375 mm (15 in) ASW rocket launcher; 2 × HOS-301 triple 324 mm (12.8 in) torpedo tubes

JDS Aokumo (DD-119) was the fourth ship of Yamagumo-class destroyers.

== Construction and career ==
Aokumo was laid down at Sumitomo Heavy Industries Uraga Shipyard on 2 October 1970 and launched on 20 March 1972. She was commissioned on 25 November 1972. She was incorporated into the 23rd Escort Corps along with JDS Asagumo and deployed to Sasebo.

Participated in practicing ocean voyages in 1974 and 1978.

From July 17 to August 28, 1976, she participated in RIMPAC 1976 with the escort ship JDS Akigumo, JDS Narushio and eight P-2J aircraft.

On October 5, 1979, at the Terashima harbor in Nagasaki Prefecture, the bow of JDS Aokumo during a night anchoring training that relied only on the moonlight without using any radar or lighting. It touched the rear part of the starboard side of JDS Akigumo, a hole was created on the waterline of Akigumo, and a small crack occurred on the starboard bow waterline of Akigumo. Neither ship was severely damaged.

On March 27, 1982, the 23rd Escort Corps was reorganized under the 4th Escort Corps group, and the fixed port was transferred to Ominato.

On January 31, 1990, the 23rd Escort Corps was reorganized under the control of the Ominato District Force.

Engaged in disaster dispatch activities due to the Hokkaido Nansei-oki Earthquake that occurred on July 2, 1993.

On March 24, 1997, the 23rd escort corps was renamed to the 25th escort corps due to the revision of the corps number.

On March 18, 1999, she was reclassified as a training vessel and her registration number changed to TV-3512. She was transferred to the 1st Training Squadron of the Training Squadron, and the home port was transferred to Kure.

She was removed on June 13, 2003. Her total itinerary during her commission reached 820,117 nautical miles, about 41 laps of the globe.
