= JDS Yamagumo =

Yamagumo-class destroyer

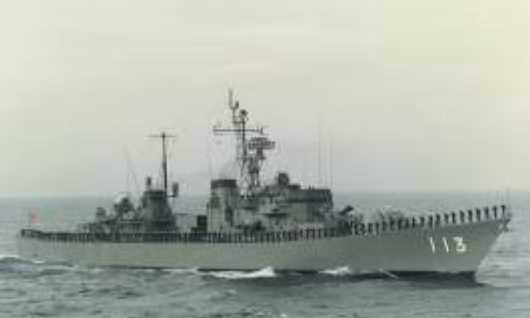
- JDS Yamagumo

History

Japan
- Name: Yamagumo; (やまぐも)
- Namesake: Yamagumo (1937)
- Ordered: 1962
- Builder: Mitsui, Tamano
- Laid down: 23 March 1964
- Launched: 27 February 1965
- Commissioned: 29 January 1966
- Decommissioned: 1 August 1995
- Reclassified: TV-3506
- Home port: Sasebo
- Identification: Pennant number: DD-113
- Fate: Scrapped

General characteristics
- Class & type: Yamagumo-class destroyer
- Displacement: 2,050 long tons (2,083 t) standard
- Length: 114.0 m (374 ft 0 in) overall
- Beam: 11.8 m (38 ft 9 in)
- Draft: 3.9 m (12 ft 10 in)
- Propulsion: 4 × Mitsui 1228 V3 BU-38V diesels; 2 × Mitsui 1628 V3 BU-38V diesels; 2 shafts, 26,000 bhp
- Speed: 27 knots (31 mph; 50 km/h)
- Range: 6,000 nmi (11,000 km)
- Complement: 210
- Sensors & processing systems: AN/SQS-23
- Electronic warfare & decoys: NOLR-1B
- Armament: 4 × Mk.33 3"/50 caliber guns; 1 × ASROC anti-submarine rocket system; 1 × Bofors 375 mm (15 in) ASW rocket launcher; 2 × HOS-301 triple 324 mm (12.8 in) torpedo tubes

JDS Yamagumo (DD-113) was the lead ship of Yamagumo-class destroyers.

== Construction and career ==
Yamagumo was laid down at Mitsui Engineering & Shipbuilding Tamano Shipyard on 23 March 1964 and launched on 27 February 1965. She was commissioned on 29 January 1966.

On 19 March 1966, the 21st Escort Corps was newly formed under the 2nd Escort Corps group, and was incorporated with JDS Makigumo commissioned on the same day.

She participated in three practicing voyages in the ocean in 1971, 1975 and 1981.

On 1 December 1977, the 21st Escort Corps was reorganized under the 3rd Escort Corps group. On 20 February 1987, the 21st Escort Corps was reorganized under the Sasebo District Force.

On 20 June 1991, she was reclassified as a training vessel and her registration number changed to TV-3506.

She was transferred to the 1st Training Squadron and her home port was transferred to Kure. In addition, the remodeling work to a training ship was carried out from 28 June to 24 October of the same year, the ASROC launcher was used as a trainee auditorium (accommodating 36 people), and a part of the officer's bedroom was a female SDF officer. It was remodeled for use (14 people).

She was removed from the register on 1 August 1995.
