= Japanese ship Jintsū =

Several ships have been named Jintsū (神通):

- Japanese cruiser Jintsū, a Sendai-class light cruiser in the Imperial Japanese Navy during World War II
- JDS Jintsū (DE-230), an Abukuma-class destroyer escort that entered into service of the Japanese Maritime Self-Defense Force in 1989

== See also ==
- Jinzū River
