= JS Hiei =

Haruna-class helicopter destroyer

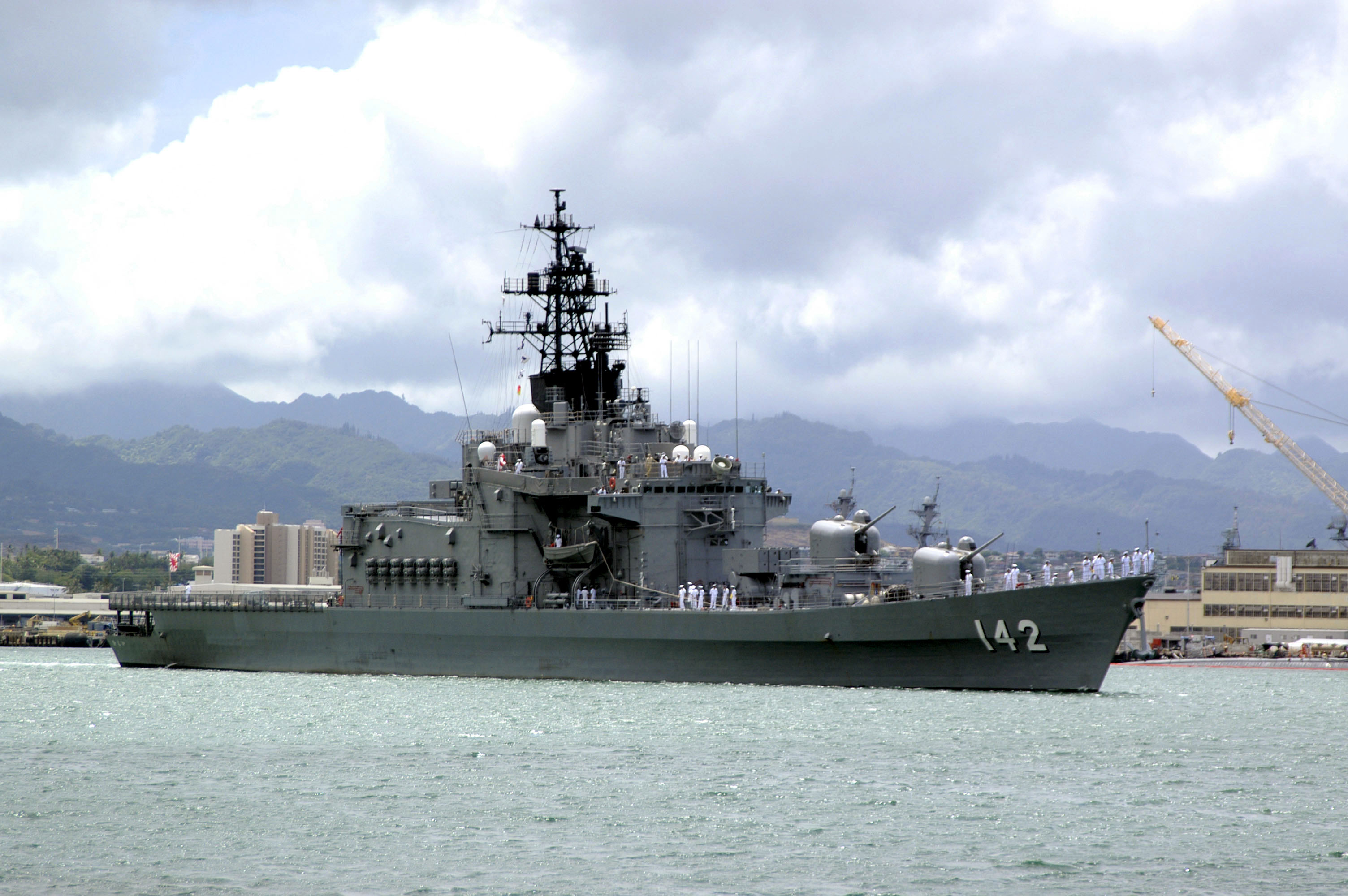
- JDS Hiei at Pearl Harbor on 5 July 2006

History

Japan
- Name: Hiei; (ひえい)
- Ordered: 1970
- Builder: Ishikawajima-Harima Heavy Industries
- Laid down: 8 March 1972
- Launched: 13 August 1973
- Commissioned: 27 December 1974
- Decommissioned: 16 March 2011
- Refit: 31 August 1987
- Home port: Yokosuka (1974-1995); Kure (1995-2011)
- Identification: Pennant number: DDH-142
- Fate: Scrapped

General characteristics
- Class & type: Haruna-class destroyer
- Displacement: 4,950 long tons (5,029 t) standard; 6,900 long tons (7,011 t) full load
- Length: 153.1 m (502 ft 4 in)
- Beam: 17.5 m (57 ft 5 in)
- Draught: 5.2 m (17 ft 1 in)
- Propulsion: 2 boilers 850 psi (60 kg/cm², 5.9 MPa), 430 °C; 2 turbines; 2 shafts; 60,000 hp (45,000 kW)
- Speed: 31 knots (57 km/h; 36 mph)
- Complement: 360 (36 officers)
- Armament: Sea Sparrow Mk 29 (Type 3A) SAM octuple launcher; ASROC octuple launcher; 2 × FMC 5"/54 caliber Mark 42 guns; 2 × 20 mm Phalanx CIWS; 2 × Mark 32 triple torpedo tubes (Mark 46 torpedoes)
- Aviation facilities: Extensive Helicopter landing pad, Large Helicopter hangar

JS Hiei (DDH-142) was the second ship of the Haruna-class destroyers of the Japanese Maritime Self Defense Force.

== Overview ==
The Haruna-class ships were Japan's first helicopter-equipped destroyers (DDH) and could carry and operate three helicopters. They were the first vessels of the Japanese fleet to be equipped with a fin stabilizer to stabilize its attitude during helicopter operation, and a landing restraint device (bear trap) was installed to improve the safety and efficiency of flight work on a swaying ship. Until the introduction of the Kongō-class destroyers (Aegis ships), this class was the largest escort ship of the JMSDF.

== Construction and career ==
Hiei was laid down on 8 March 1972 and launched on 13 August 1973 by IHI Corporation Tokyo Shipyard. She was commissioned on 27 December 1974, into the 1st Escort Corps and deployed in Yokosuka.

From July 3 to August 17, 1978, she participated in Hawaii dispatch training with her sister ship Haruna, the submarine Kuroshio and eight P-2J aircraft.

Hiei, Amatsukaze and eight P-2Js were dispatched to the United States from January 25, 1980, and participated in the Exercise RIMPAC 1980 exercise between February 26 and March 18. They were the first ships to participate in warfare exercises outside Japan, returning on April 2.

On March 30, 1983, the 51st Escort Corps was abolished and Hiei became a ship under the direct control of the 1st Escort Corps.

On March 30, 1984, she was incorporated into the 4th Escort Corps as a flagship.

The FRAM refurbishment carried out from August 31, 1987 to March 13, 1989 improved anti-submarine search capability, individual ship air defense capability, combat command / information processing capability, and electronic warfare capability. However, the cost-effectiveness of FRAM refurbishment was not efficient, and similar large-scale refurbishment was only carried out on two Haruna-class vessels.

On March 2, 1995, due to the relocation of the 4th Escort Group Command to Kure, the homeport was transferred to Kure.

In 1996, she participated in the Exercise RIMPAC 1996.

From May 11 to August 12, 1999, she participated in the US dispatch training with Myōkō and Amagiri.

Hiei participated in the Japan-Russia search and rescue joint training conducted off the coast of Petropavlovsk-Kamchatsky, Russia from September 1 to 11, 2000 with Hamagiri.

From May 16 to August 3, 2001, participated in the US dispatch training with the Chōkai and Samidare.

On September 17, 2002, based on the Act on Special Measures Against Terrorism, dispatched to the Indian Ocean with Samidare. Engaged in missions until December of the same year, and returned to Japan on January 26, 2003. On October 28, 2003, she was dispatched to the Indian Ocean along with Akebono and Tokiwa. Engaged in missions until January 2004 and returned to Japan on March 3.

From June 6 to 10, 2005, she visited Vladivostok, Russia, and participated in the Japan-Russia search and rescue joint training off the coast of Vladivostok on the 10th.

In 2006, she participated in the Exercise RIMPAC 2006.

On March 26, 2008, the escort corps was reorganized and transferred to the 4th Escort Corps.

From July 23 to 27, 2010, participated in the Japan-Russia search and rescue joint training SAREX off the coast of Vladivostok, Russia, with Jintsū.

On March 16, 2011, she was decommissioned. Her final affiliation was the 4th Escort Corps and the homeport was Kure. The commissioning period was 36 years and 3 months, which is the longest among the ships of the Maritime Self-Defense Force in history, with a cruising distance of about 44 laps around the Earth and a voyage time of about 79,000 hours.

== Gallery ==
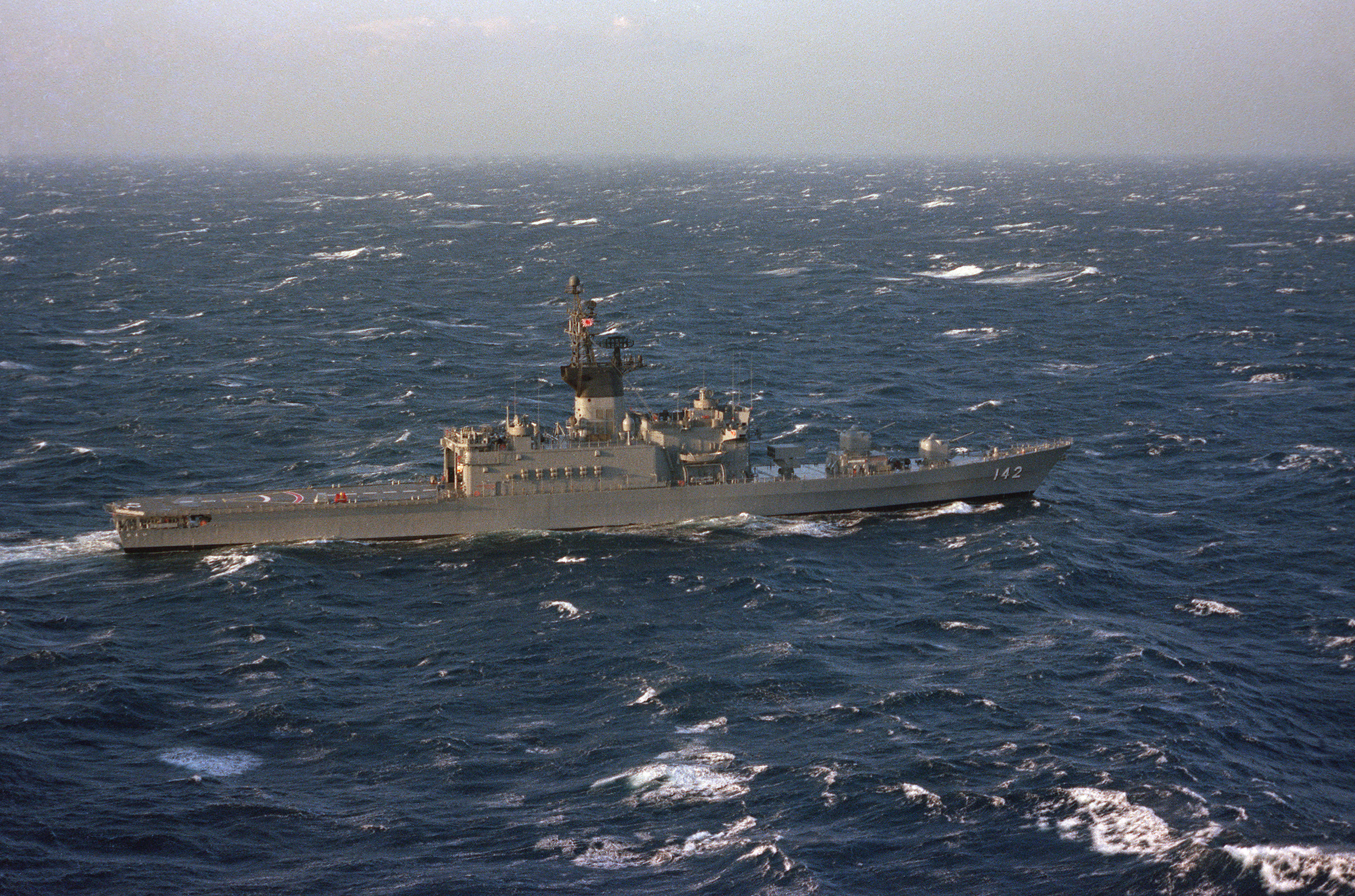
Hiei underway on 3 February 1985

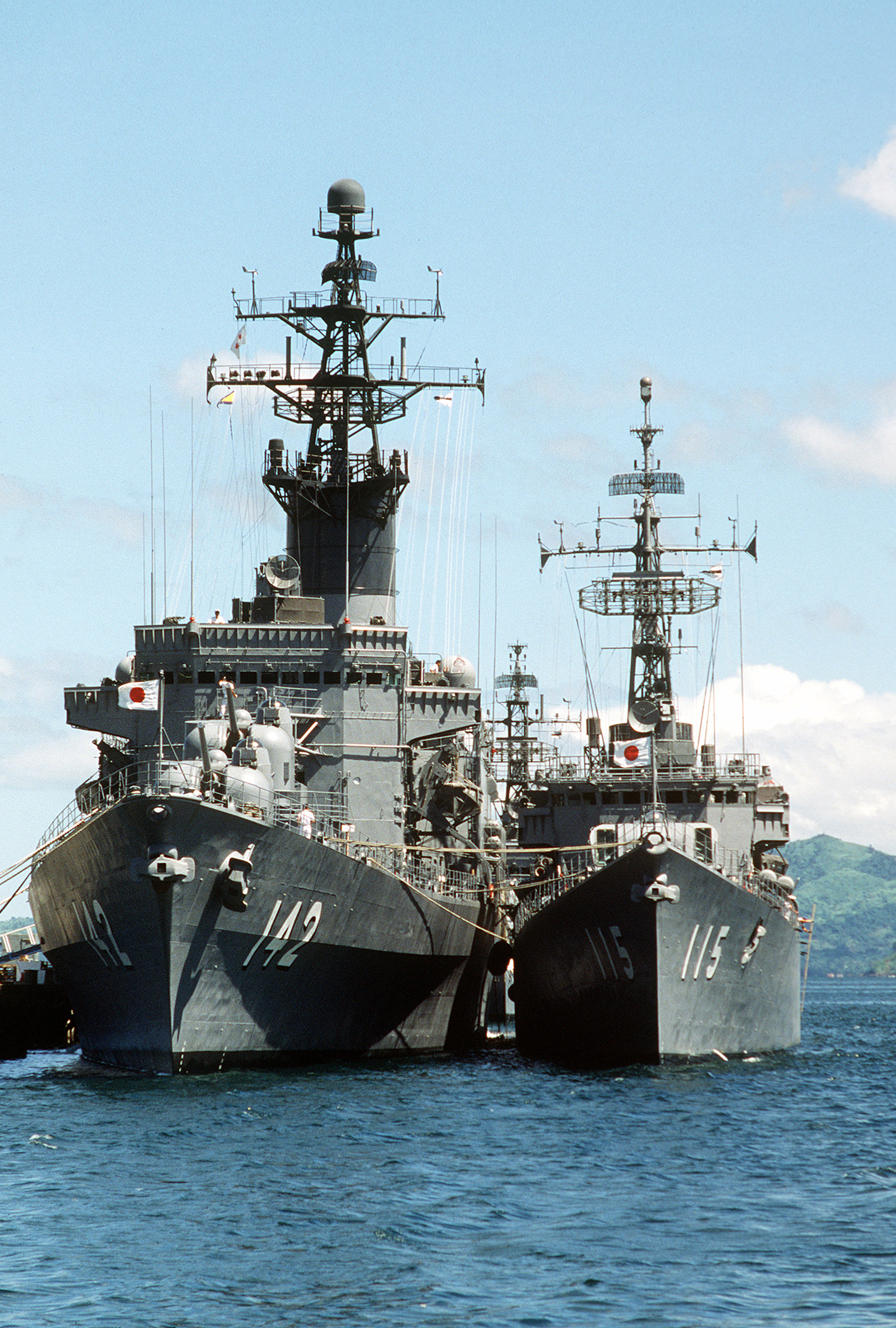
Hiei and Asagumo at Subic Bay on 1 August 1988

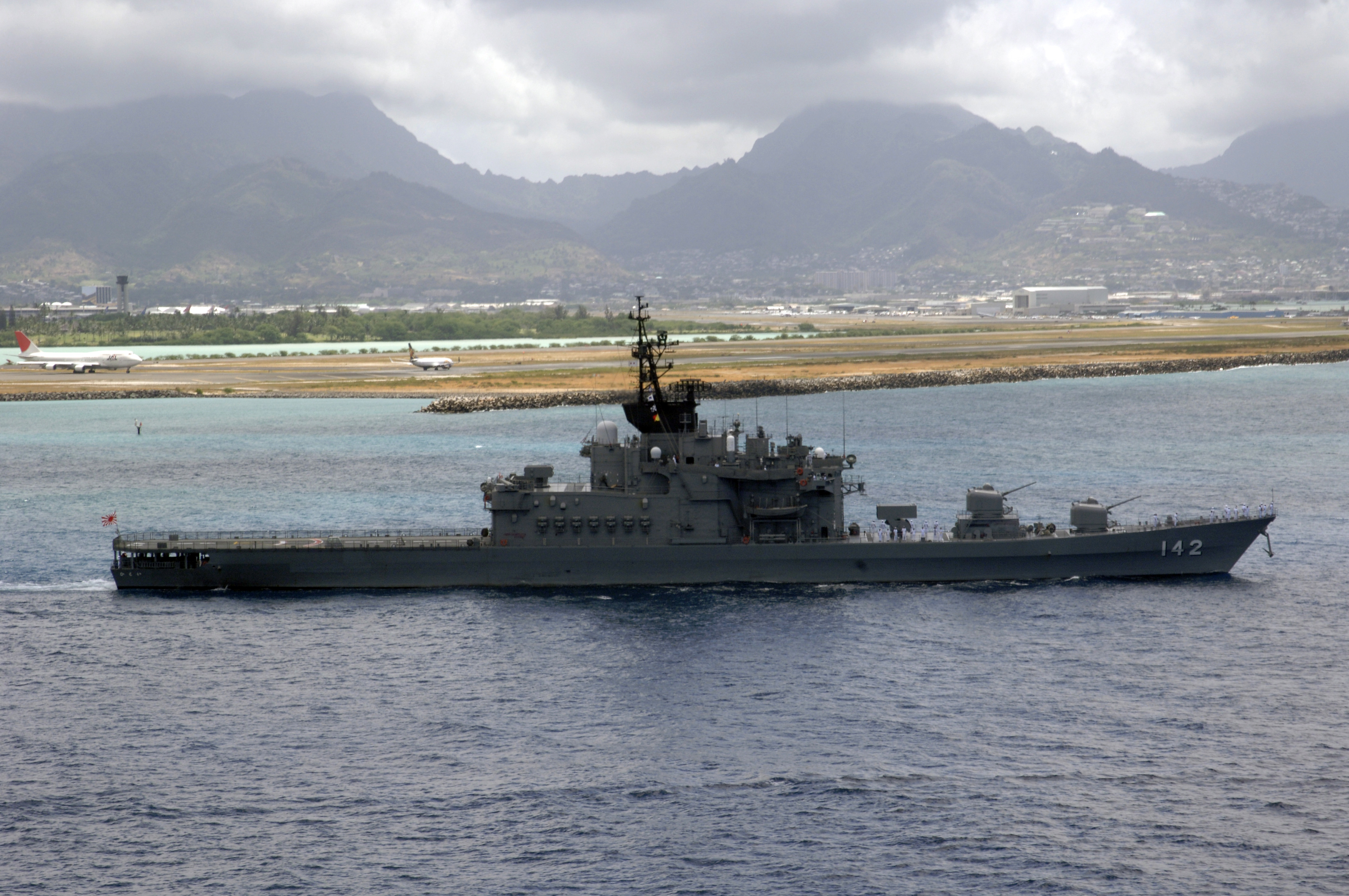
Hiei departs Pearl Harbor on 5 July July 2006

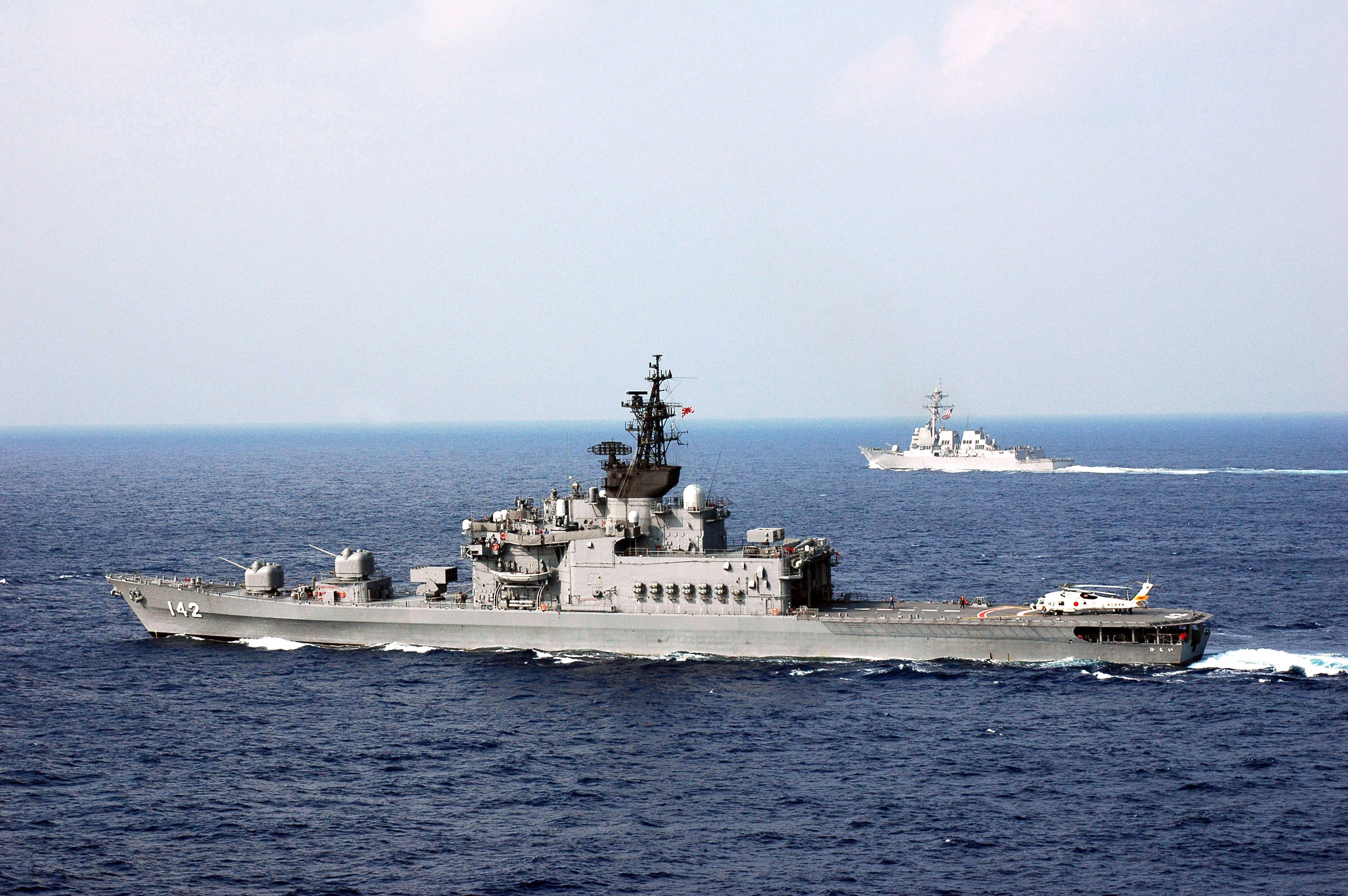
Hiei underway on 16 November 2007

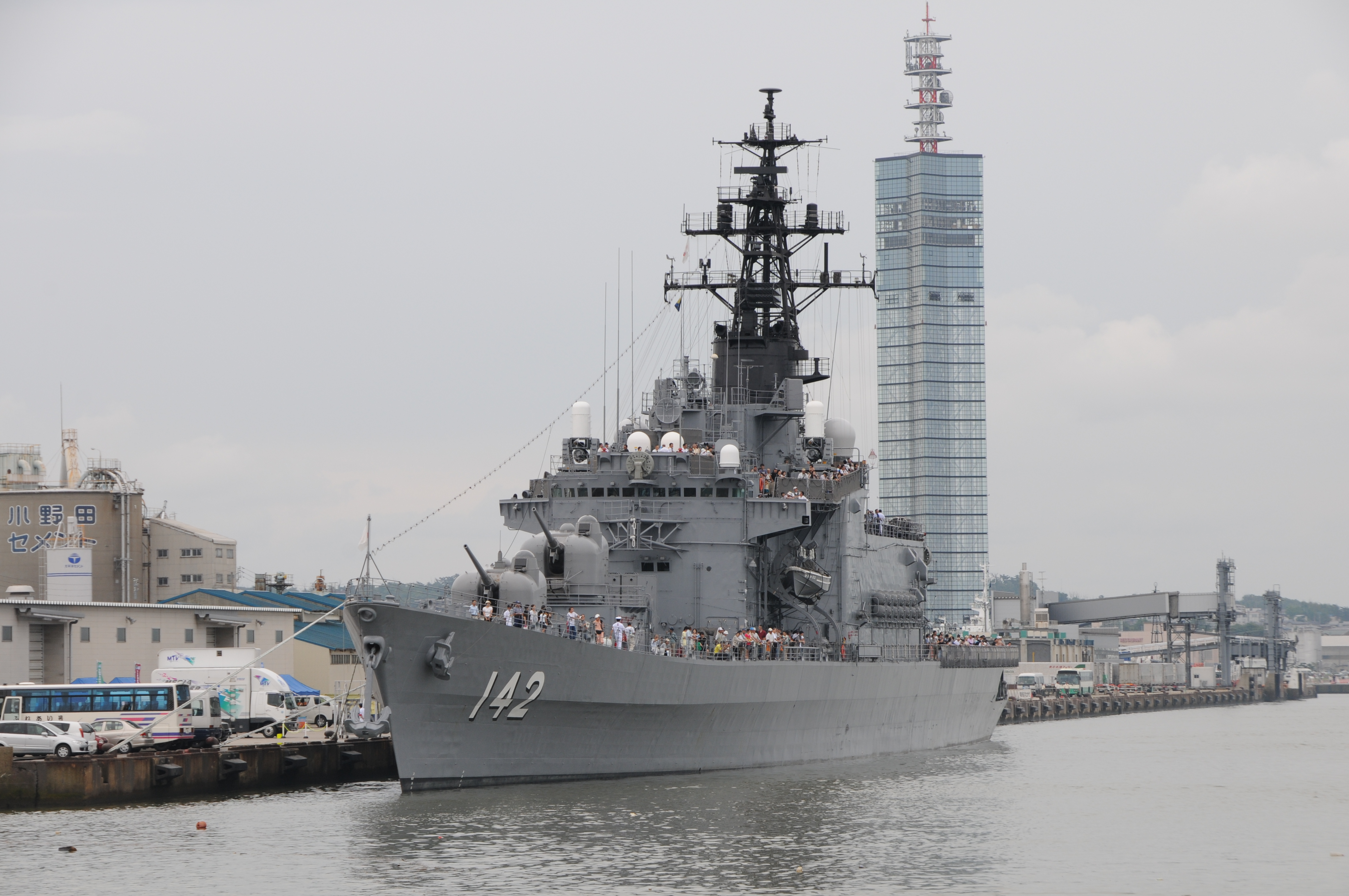
Hiei on 25 July 2009

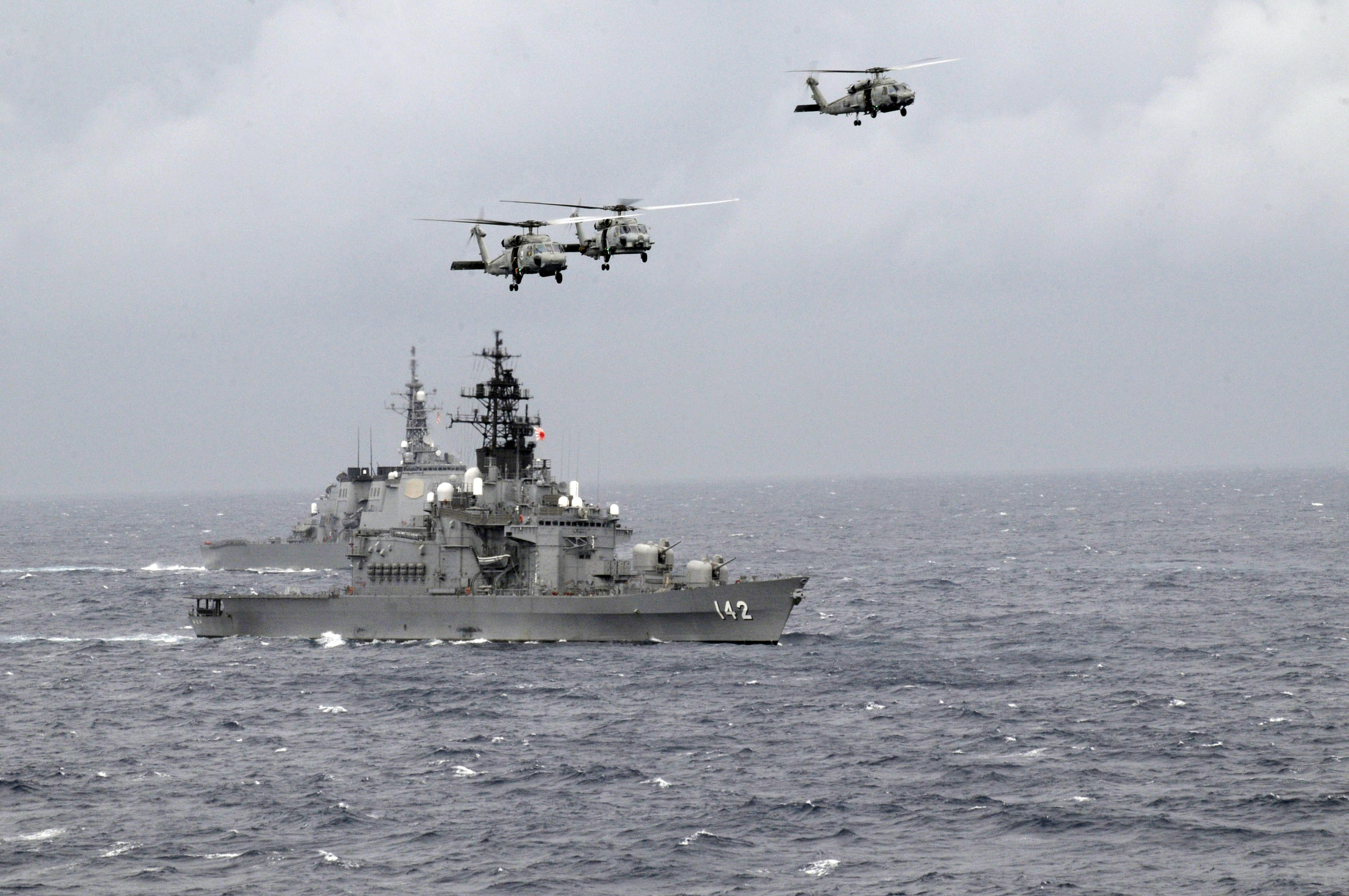
Hiei and Kongō underway on 17 November 2009

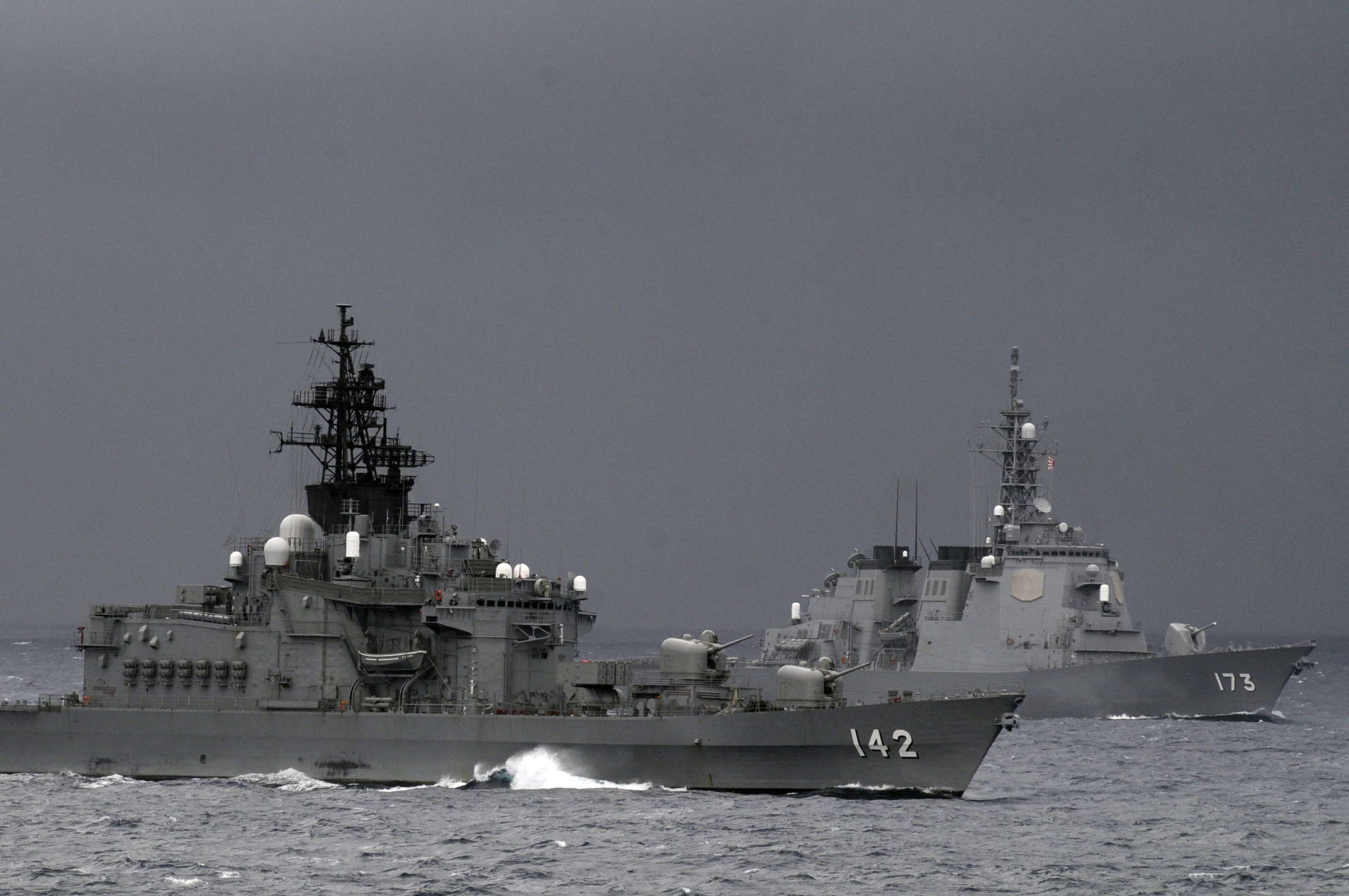

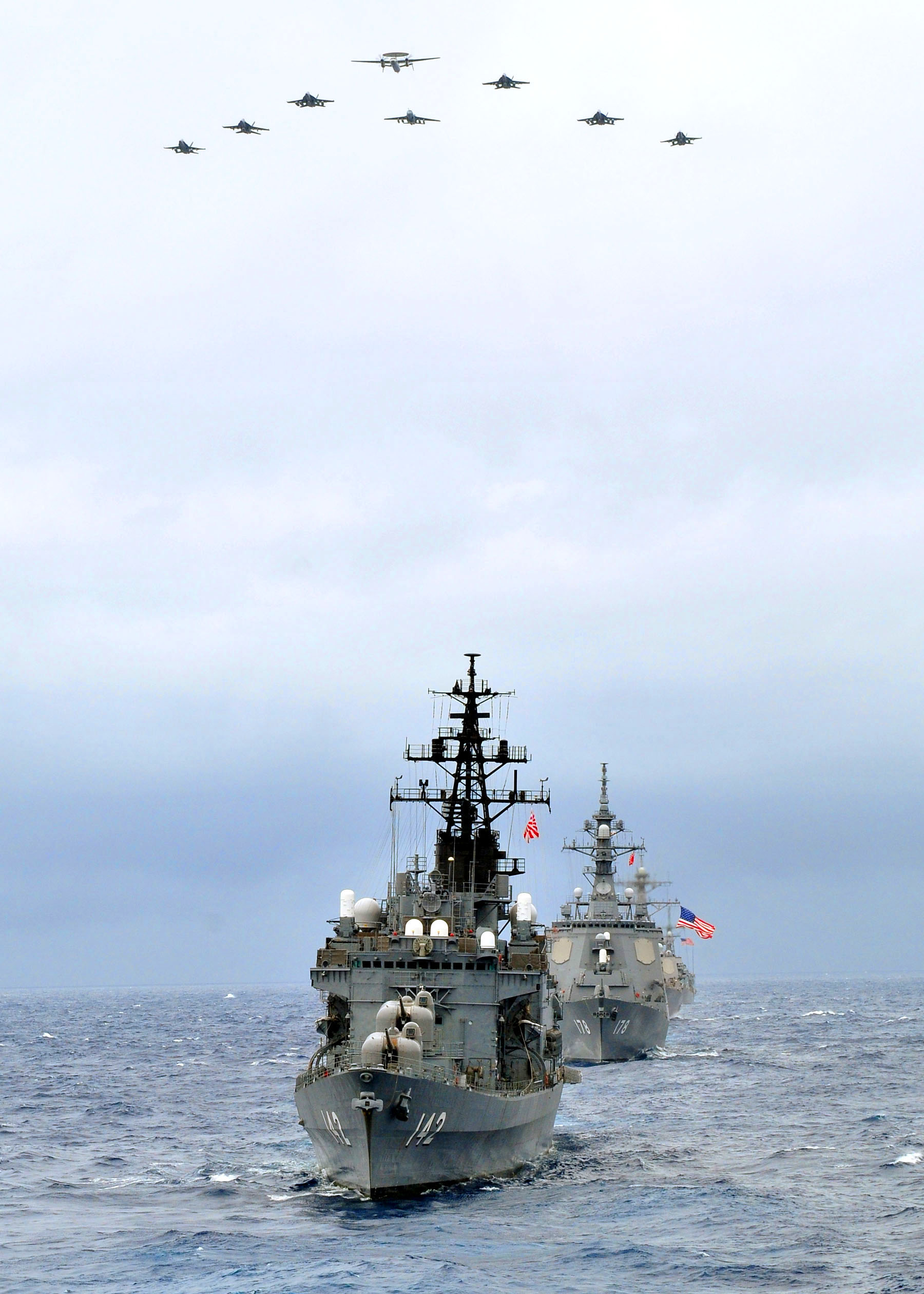

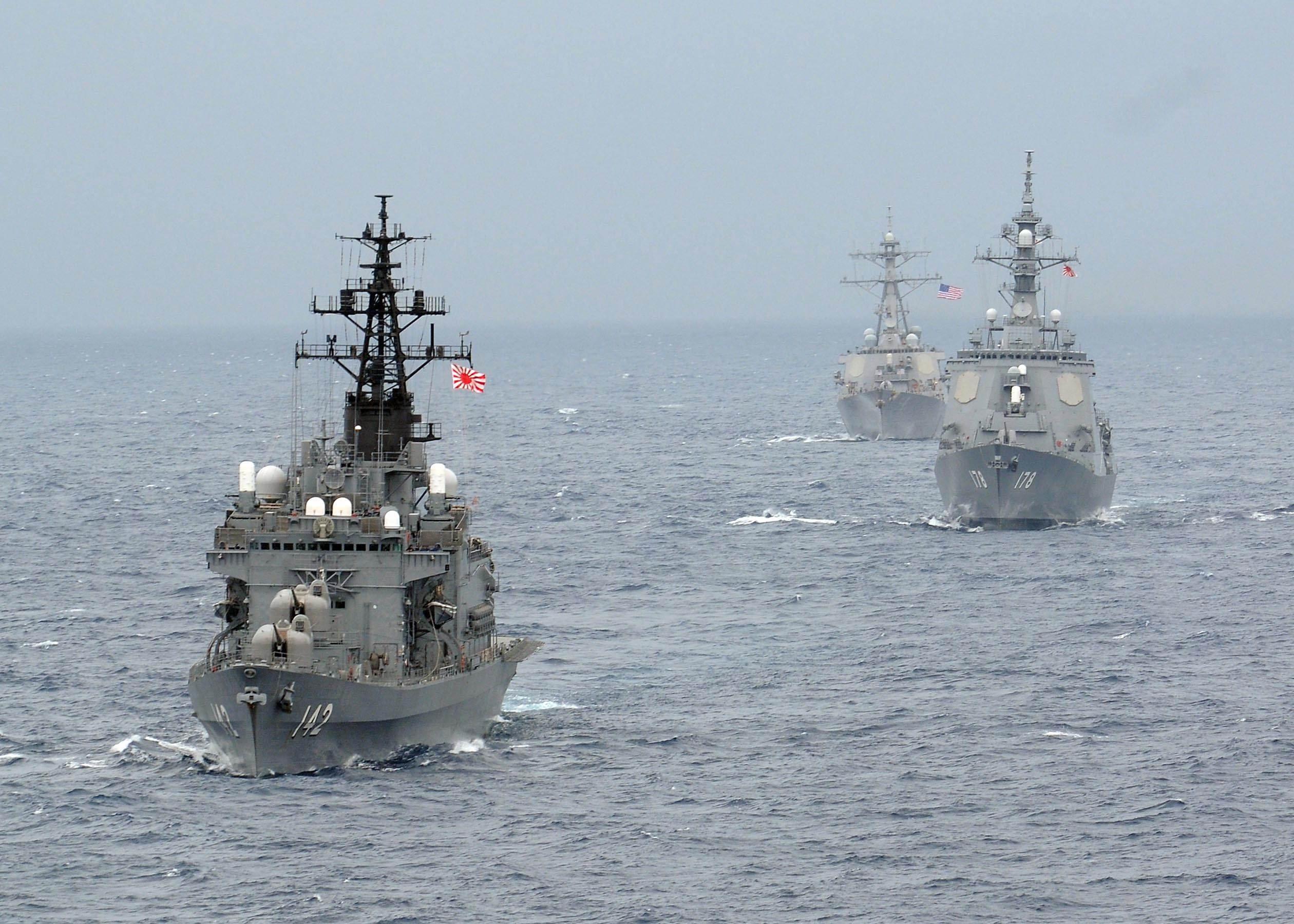
Hiei, Ashigara and USS Curtis Wilbur underway on 17 November 2009

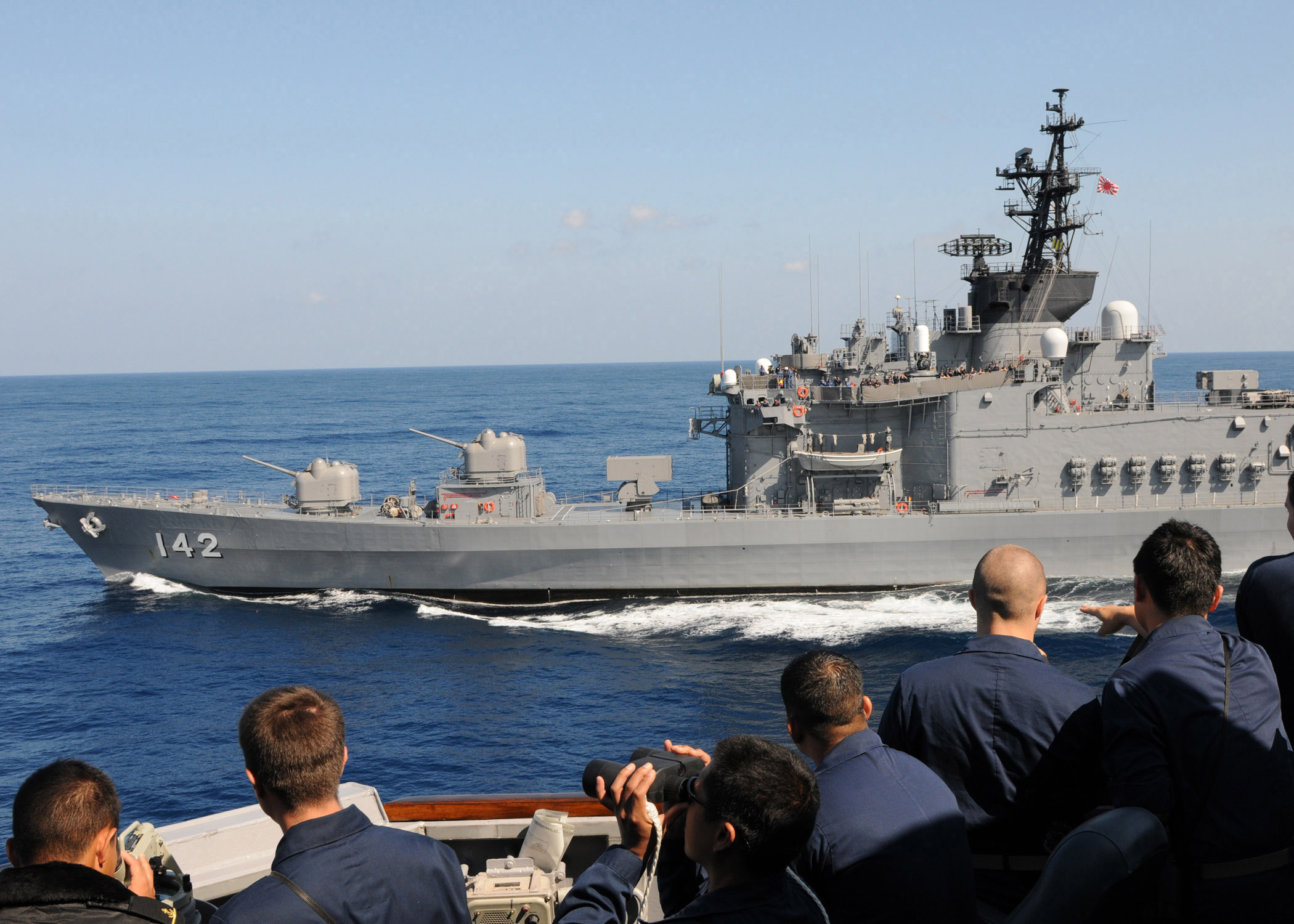
Hiei alongside USS Mustin on 10 June 1010

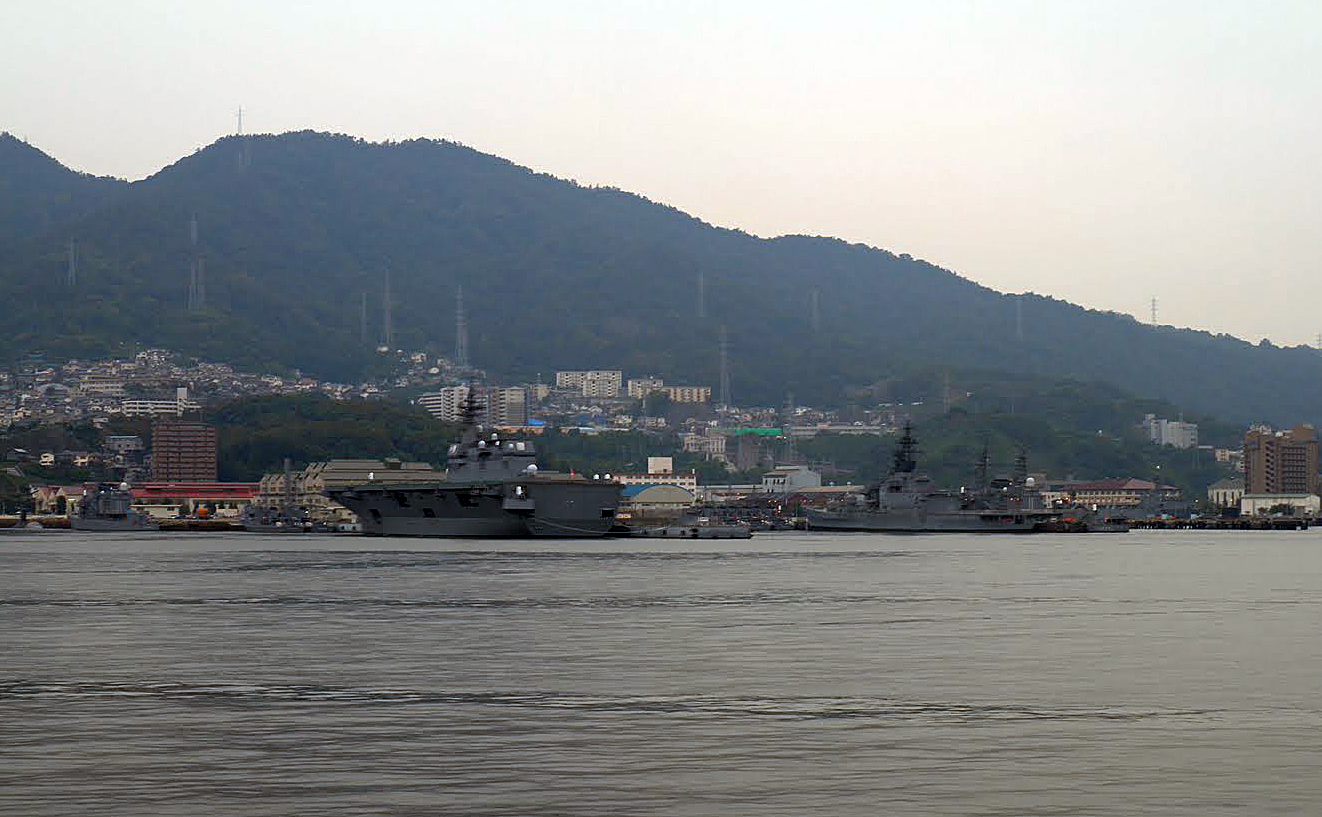
Hiei and Ise at Kure on 29 October 2011

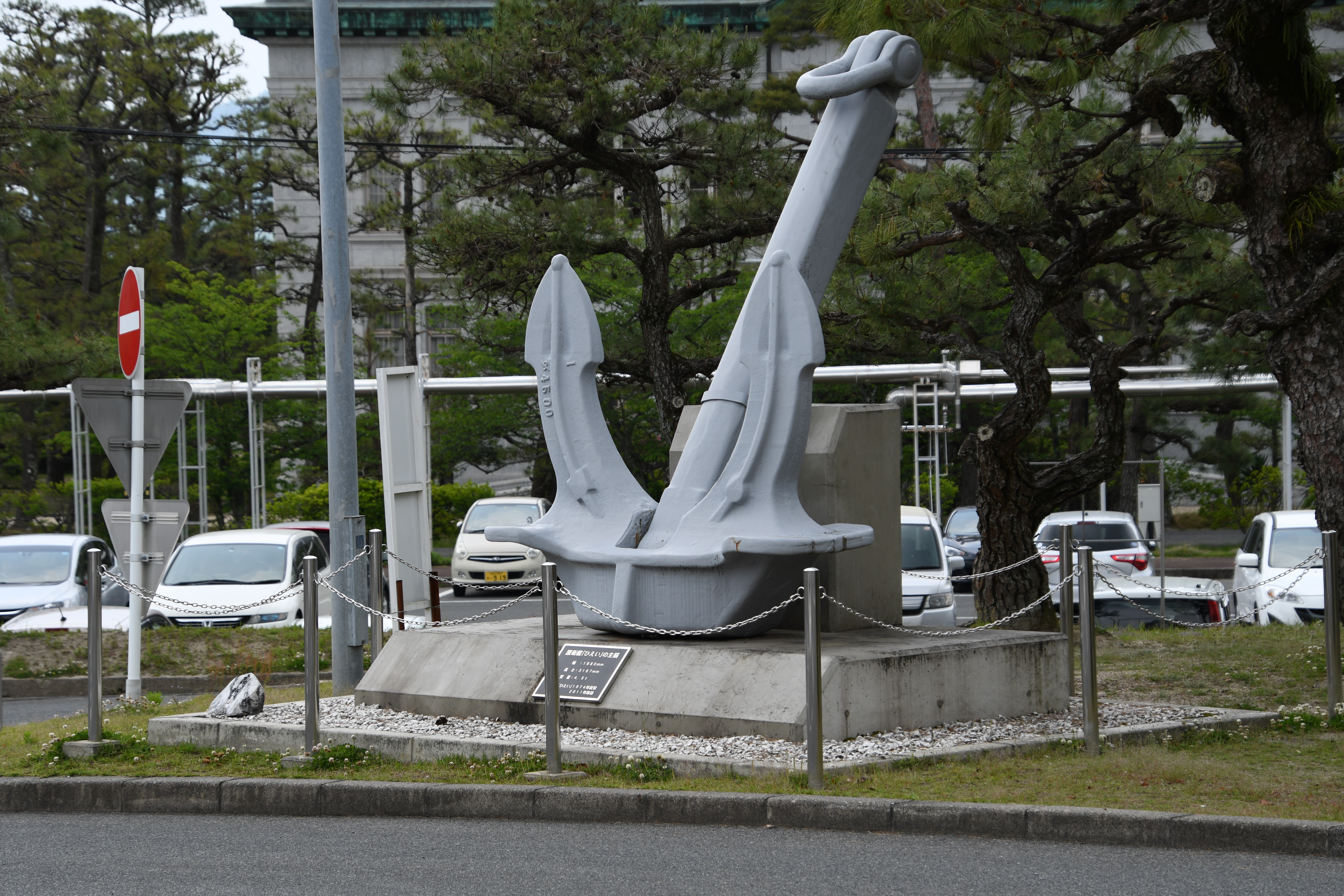
Hiei's anchor on display on 6 May 2019
