= JDS Akigumo =

Yamagumo-class destroyer

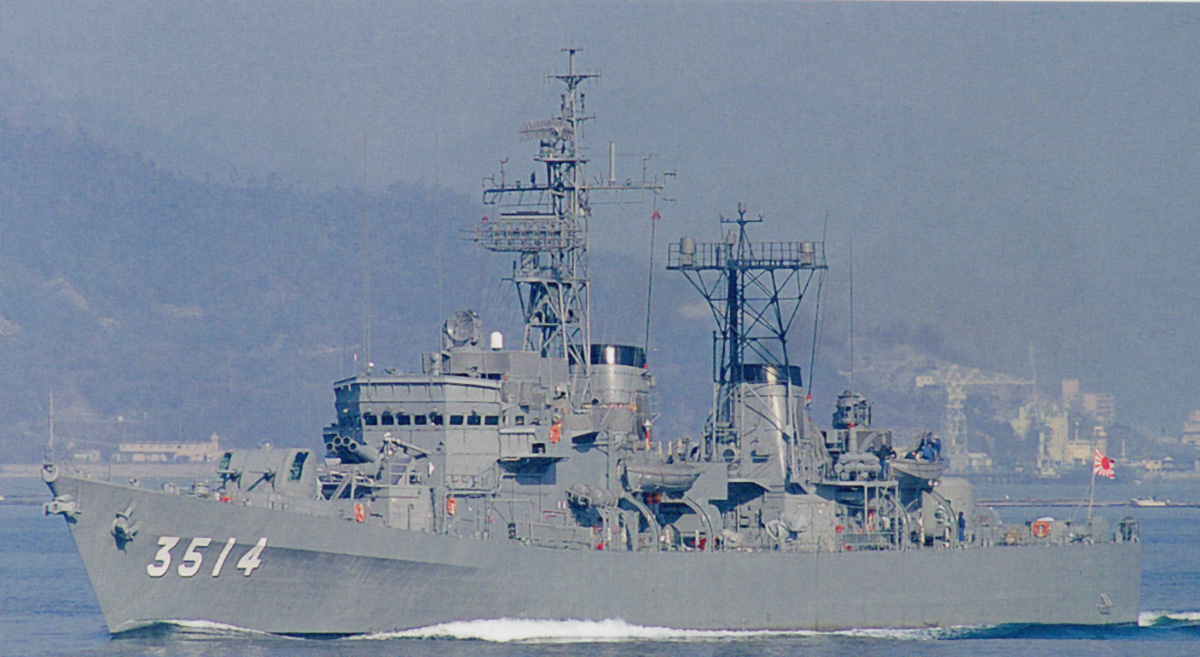
- JDS Akigumo (TV-3514) underway

History

Japan
- Name: Akigumo; (あきぐも)
- Namesake: Akigumo (1941)
- Ordered: 1971
- Builder: Sumitomo, Uraga
- Laid down: 7 July 1972
- Launched: 23 October 1973
- Commissioned: 24 July 1974
- Decommissioned: 16 February 2005
- Home port: Kure
- Identification: Pennant number: DD-120
- Reclassified: TV-3514
- Fate: Scrapped

General characteristics
- Class & type: Yamagumo-class destroyer
- Displacement: 2,150 long tons (2,185 t) standard
- Length: 115.2 m (377 ft 11 in) overall
- Beam: 11.8 m (38 ft 9 in)
- Draft: 4.0 m (13 ft 1 in)
- Propulsion: 6 × Mitsubishi 12 UEV 30/40 diesels
- Speed: 27 knots (31 mph; 50 km/h)
- Range: 6,000 nmi (11,000 km)
- Complement: 220
- Sensors & processing systems: OQS-3 (Type 66 passive sonar); VDS AN/SQS-35(J)
- Electronic warfare & decoys: NOLR-6
- Armament: 4 × Mk.33 3"/50 caliber guns; 1 × ASROC anti-submarine rocket system; 1 × Bofors 375 mm (15 in) ASW rocket launcher; 2 × HOS-301 triple 324 mm (12.8 in) torpedo tubes

JDS Akigumo (DD-120/TV-3514) was the fifth ship of Yamagumo-class destroyers.

== Construction and career ==
Akigumo was laid down at Sumitomo Heavy Industries Uraga Shipyard on 7 July 1972 and launched on 23 October 1973. She was commissioned on 24 July 1974.

From 17 July to 28 August 1976, the ship participated in RIMPAC 1976 with the JDS Aokumo, JDS Narushio and eight P-2J aircraft.

On the night of 5 October 1979 at Terashima harbor in Nagasaki Prefecture, the bow of JDS Aokumo struck the aft starboard hull of Akigumo. At that time, Aokumo was undergoing nighttime anchoring training that relied only on the moonlight without using any radar or artificial lighting. A breach occurred on the waterline of Akigumo and a small crack occurred on the starboard bow waterline of Aokumo. No casualties on either ship.

In 1980, she participated in the JMSDF's 24th Ocean Training Cruise.

On 27 March 1982, the 23rd Escort Corps was reorganized under the 4th Escort Corps Group, and her home port was transferred to Ōminato. On 31 January 1990, the 23rd Escort Corps was reorganized under the control of the Ōminato District Force. On 24 March 1997, the 23rd Escort Corps was renamed to the 25th Escort Corps due to the revision of the corps number.

Akigumo participated in disaster relief activities due to the eruption of Mount Usu that occurred on 31 March 2000. On 13 June, she was converted to a training ship and her hull number was changed to TV-3514.

She was transferred to the 1st Training Squadron and her home port was transferred to Kure. She was decommissioned on 16 February 2005. Her total itinerary during her commission reached about 600,000 nautical miles, about 29 laps of the globe.
