= JDS Yūgumo =

Yamagumo-class destroyer

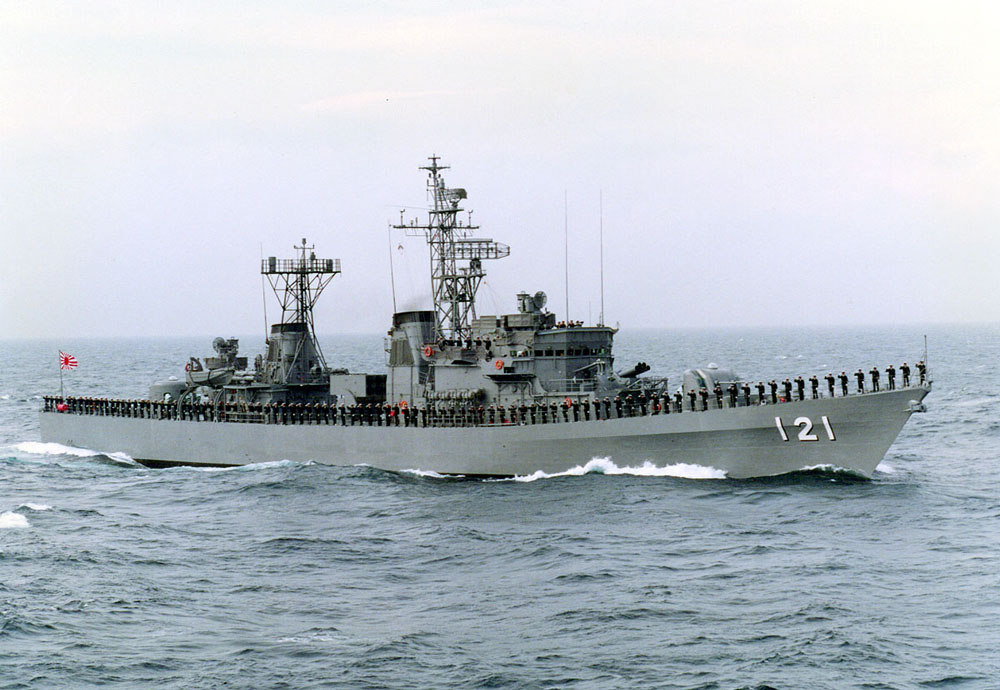
- JDS Yūgumo

History

Japan
- Name: Yūgumo; (ゆうぐも)
- Namesake: Yūgumo (1941)
- Ordered: 1974
- Builder: Sumitomo, Uraga
- Laid down: 4 February 1976
- Launched: 21 May 1977
- Commissioned: 24 March 1978
- Decommissioned: 17 June 2005
- Home port: Kure
- Identification: Pennant number: DD-120
- Fate: Scrapped

General characteristics
- Class & type: Yamagumo-class destroyer
- Displacement: 2,200 long tons (2,235 t) standard
- Length: 115.2 m (377 ft 11 in) overall
- Beam: 11.8 m (38 ft 9 in)
- Draft: 4.0 m (13 ft 1 in)
- Propulsion: 6 × Mitsubishi 12 UEV 30/40 diesels
- Speed: 28 knots (32 mph; 52 km/h)
- Range: 6,000 nmi (11,000 km)
- Complement: 220
- Sensors & processing systems: OQS-3 (Type 66 passive sonar); VDS AN/SQS-35(J)
- Electronic warfare & decoys: NOLR-6
- Armament: 4 × Mk.33 3"/50 caliber guns; 1 × ASROC anti-submarine rocket system; 1 × Bofors 375 mm (15 in) ASW rocket launcher; 2 × HOS-301 triple 324 mm (12.8 in) torpedo tubes

JDS Yūgumo (DD-121) was the sixth ship of Yamagumo-class destroyers.

== Construction and career ==
Yūgumo was laid down at Sumitomo Heavy Industries Uraga Shipyard on 4 February 1976 and launched on 21 May 1977. It was commissioned on 24 March 1978.

On March 27, 1982, it was transferred to the 23rd Escort Corps of the 4th Escort Corps, and the home port was transferred to Ominato.

On January 31, 1990, the 23rd Escort Corps was reorganized under the control of the Ominato District Force.

Engaged in disaster dispatch activities due to the Hokkaido Nansei-oki Earthquake that occurred on July 12, 1993.

On March 24, 1997, the 23rd escort corps was renamed to the 25th escort corps due to the revision of the corps number.

Engaged in disaster relief due to the eruption of Mount Usu that occurred on March 31, 2000.

Removed from the register on June 17, 2005. The total cruising range was about 652,372 nautical miles (about 30 laps of the earth).
