= JS Jintsū =

Abukuma-class destroyer escort

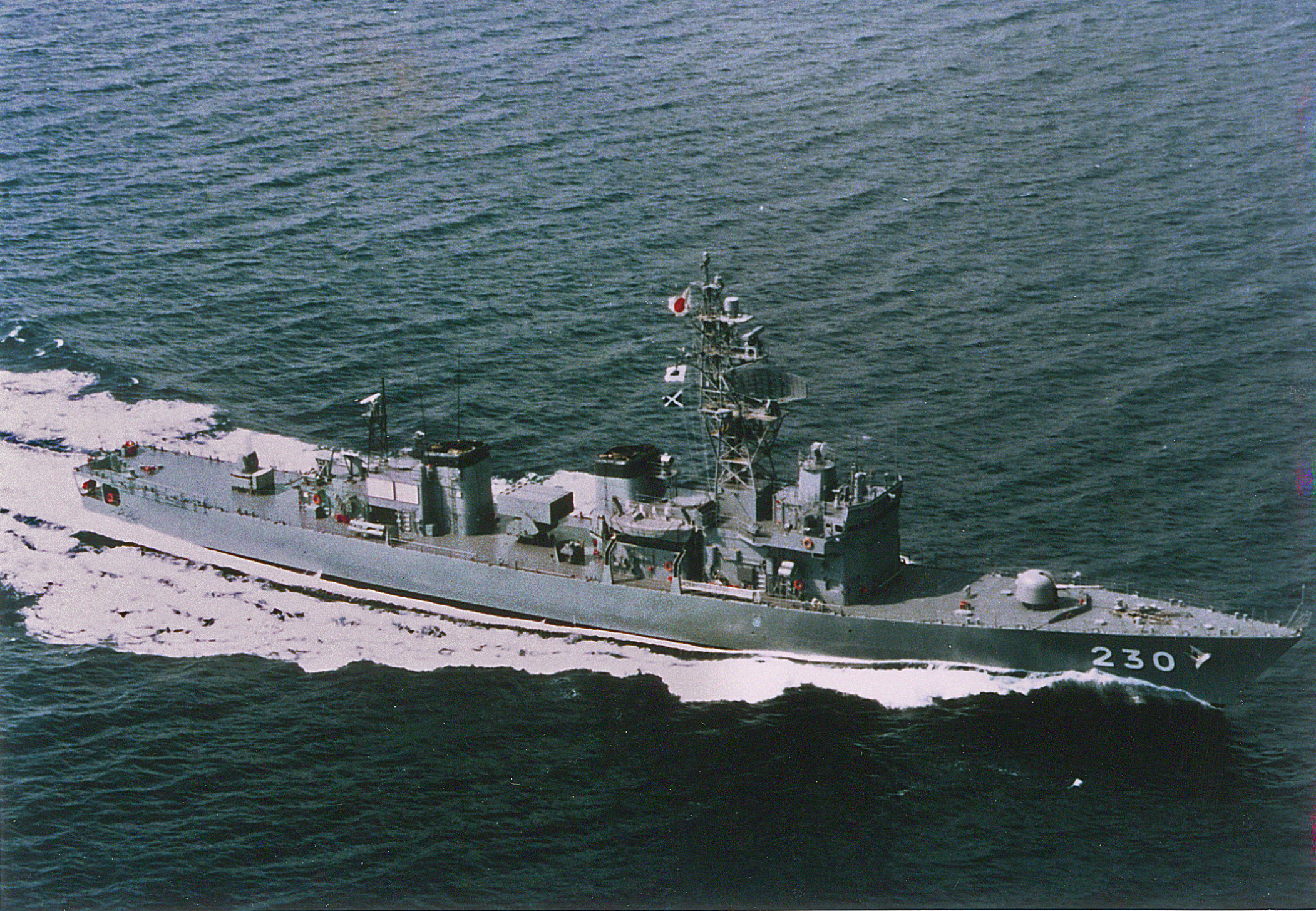
- JS Jintsū

History

Japan
- Name: Jintsū; (じんつう)
- Ordered: 1986
- Builder: Hitachi, Maizuru
- Laid down: 14 April 1988
- Launched: 31 January 1989
- Commissioned: 28 February 1990
- Home port: Sasebo
- Identification: MMSI number: 431999573; Pennant number: DE-230
- Status: Active

General characteristics
- Class & type: Abukuma-class destroyer escort
- Displacement: 2,000 tons standard; 2,550 tons full load
- Length: 357 ft (109 m)
- Beam: 44 ft (13 m)
- Draft: 12 ft (3.7 m)
- Propulsion: CODOG, two shafts; 2 × Kawasaki-RR SM1A gas turbines 26,650 hp (19,870 kW); 2 × Mitsubishi S12U MTK diesels 6,000 hp (4,500 kW)
- Speed: 27 knots (50 km/h; 31 mph)
- Complement: 120
- Sensors & processing systems: FCS-2
- Armament: 8 × Harpoon missiles; ASROC octuple launcher; 1 × Otobreda 76 mm gun; 1 × Phalanx 20 mm CIWS; 2 × HOS-301 triple 324 mm (12.8 in) torpedo tubes

JS Jintsū (DE-230) is the second ship of the Abukuma-class destroyer escorts. She was commissioned on 28 February 1990.

== Construction and career ==
Jintsū was laid down at Hitachi Zosen Corporation Maizuru Shipyard on 14 April 1988 and launched on 31 January 1989. She was commissioned on 28 February 1990 and deployed to Maizuru.

On 7 December 1992, the Russian Navy Udaloy-class destroyer Admiral Tributs was monitored at the Tsushima Strait East Waterworks.

The vessel joined the Maizuru District Force 24th Escort Corps on 6 November 2003. On 17 June 2005, she was transferred to the 25th Escort Corps of the Ominato District Force, and the homeport was transferred from Maizuru to Ominato. On 26 March 2008, the 25th escort was renamed to the 15th escort due to a major reorganization of the Self-Defense Fleet, and was reorganized under the escort fleet.

From 23–27 July 2010, after attending the 130th anniversary event and observing ceremony off the coast of Vladivostok, Russia, Jintsū participated in the 11th Russo-Japanese Search and Rescue Joint Training SAREX with the escort ship JS Hiei.

On 1 June 2011, the escort fleet was transferred to the 13th escort corps due to reorganization, and the homeport was transferred from Ominato to Sasebo.

== Gallery ==
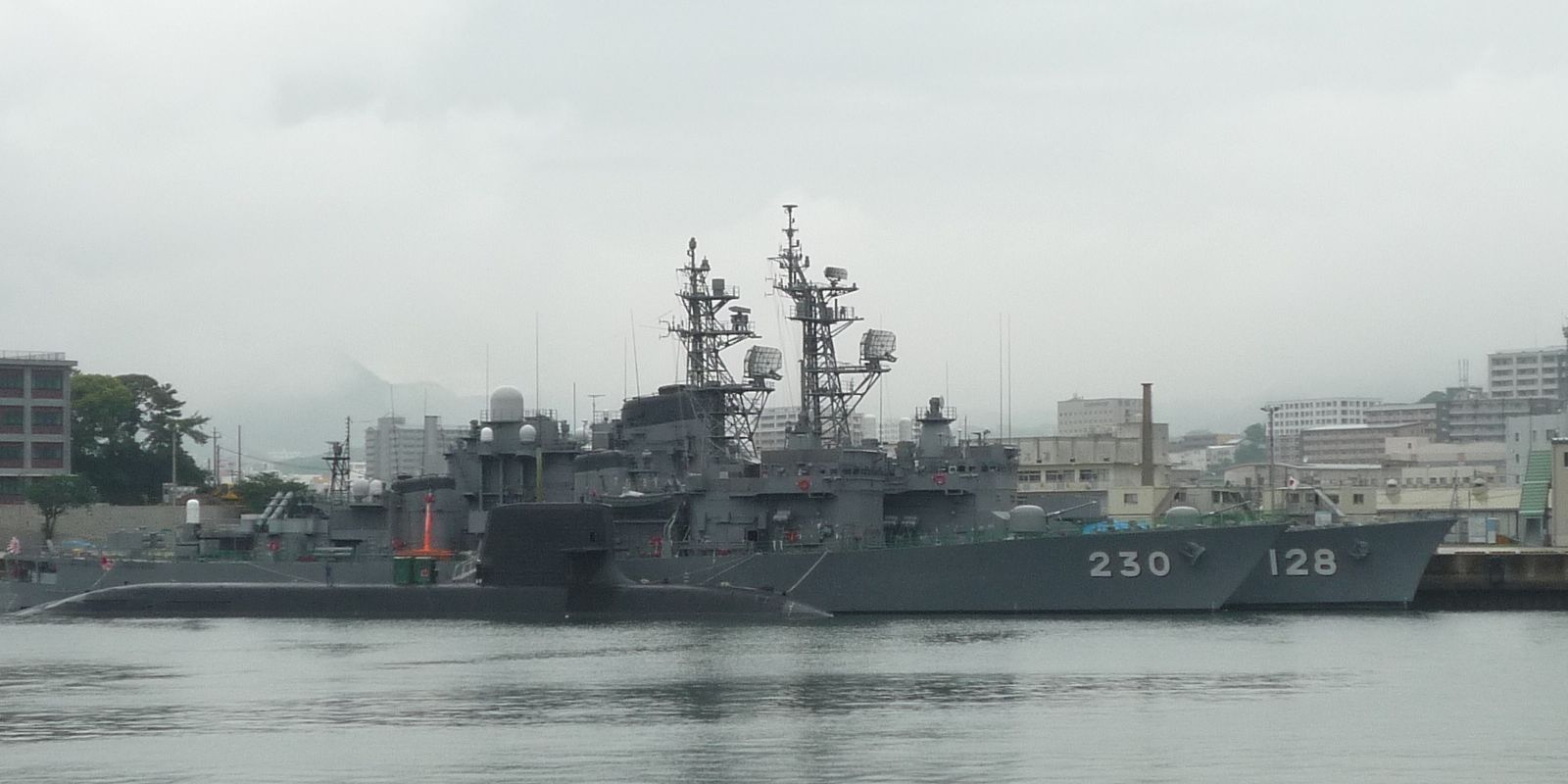
JS Jintsū and JS Haruyuki on 18 June 2011.

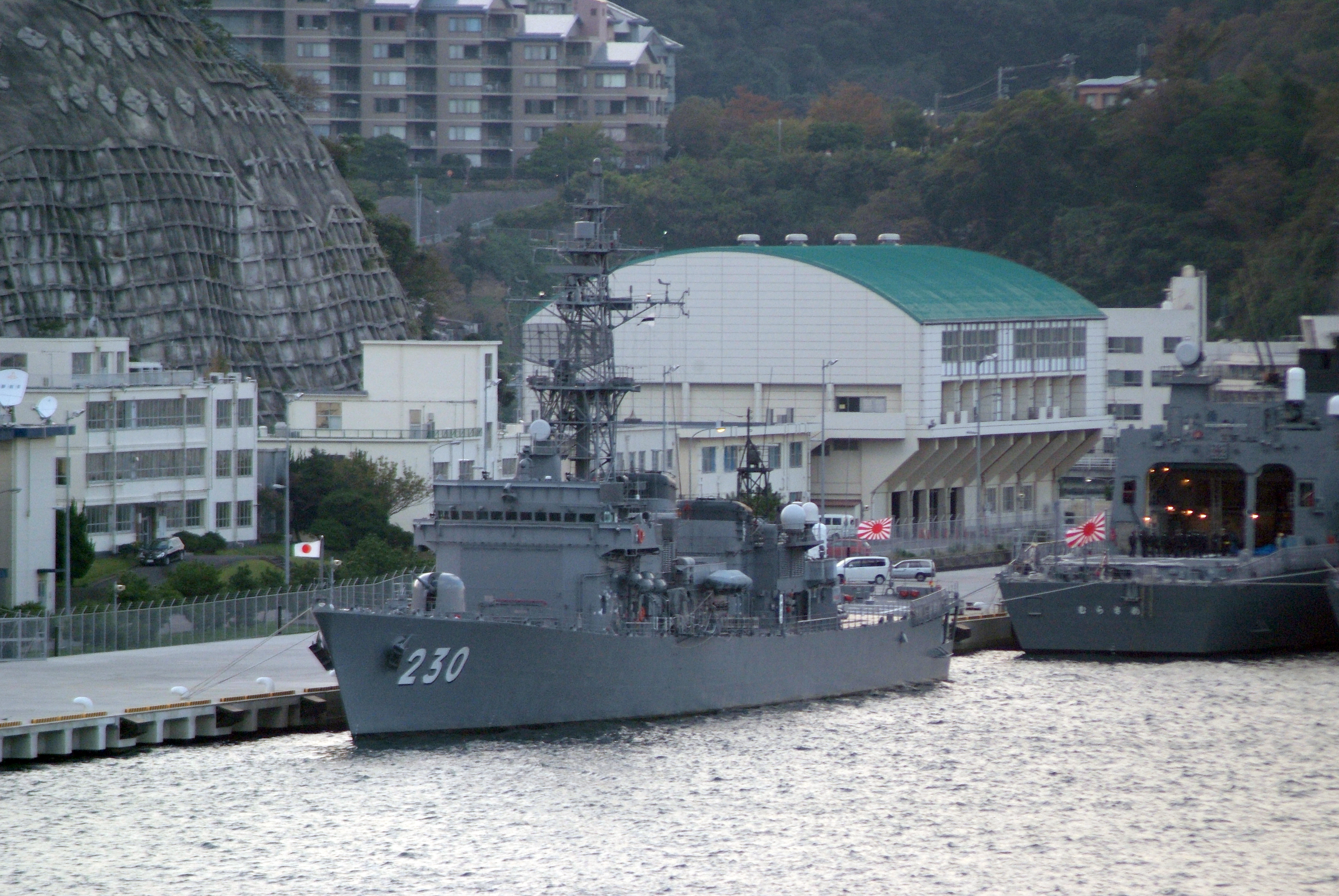
JS Jintsū at Yokosuka on 29 October 2011.

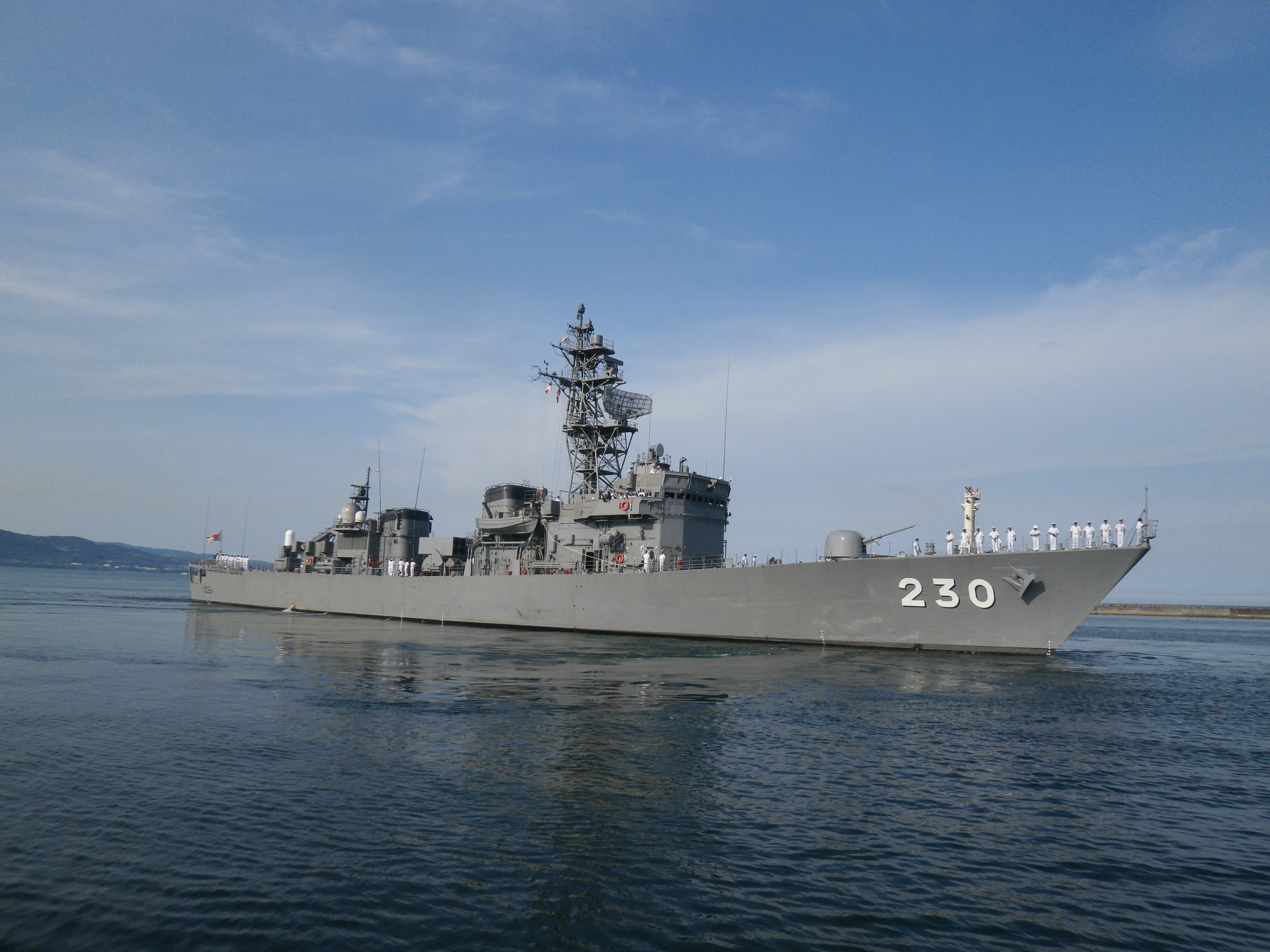
JS Jintsū on 31 July 2016.

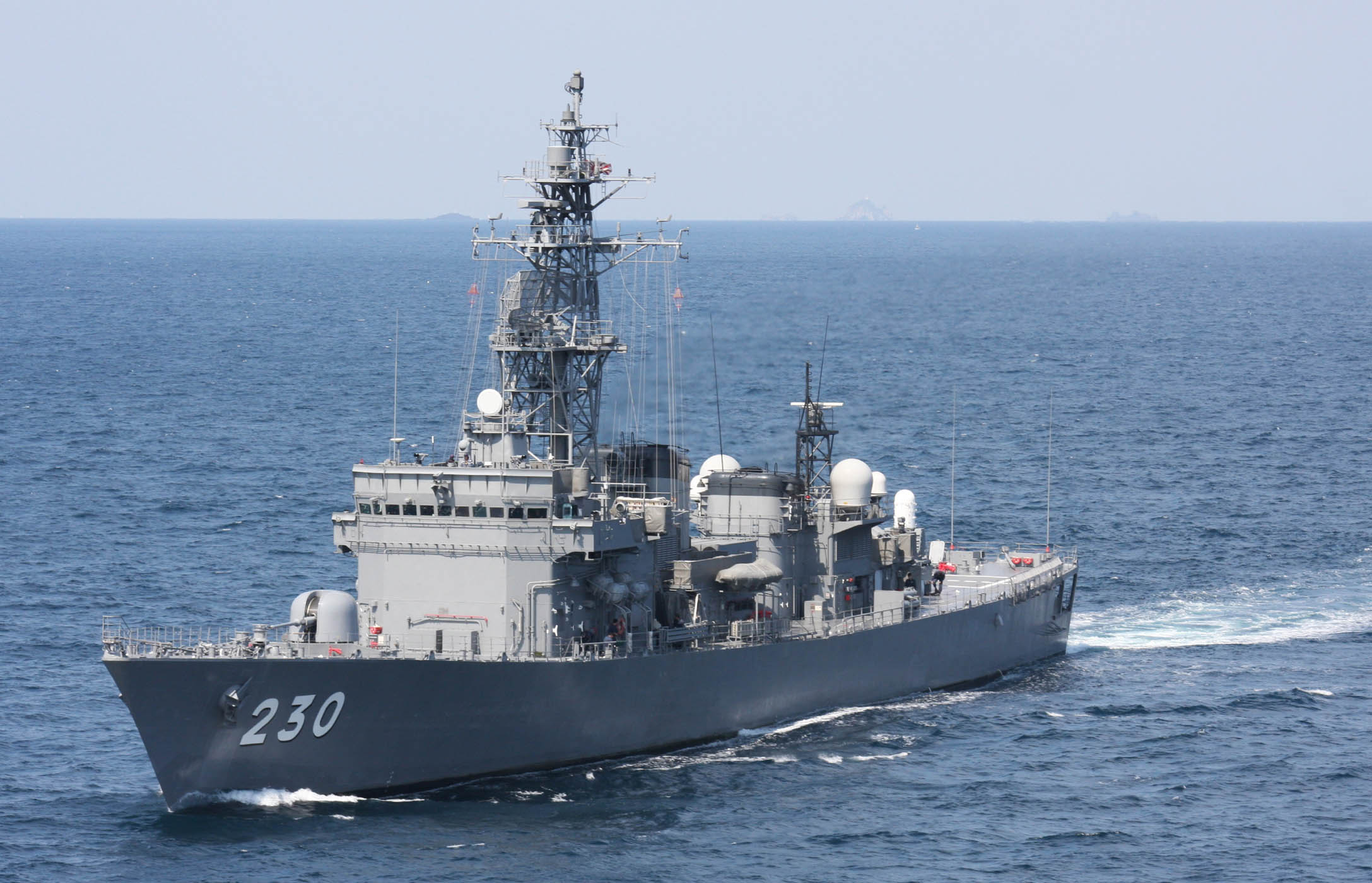
JS Jintsū on 23 May 2019.

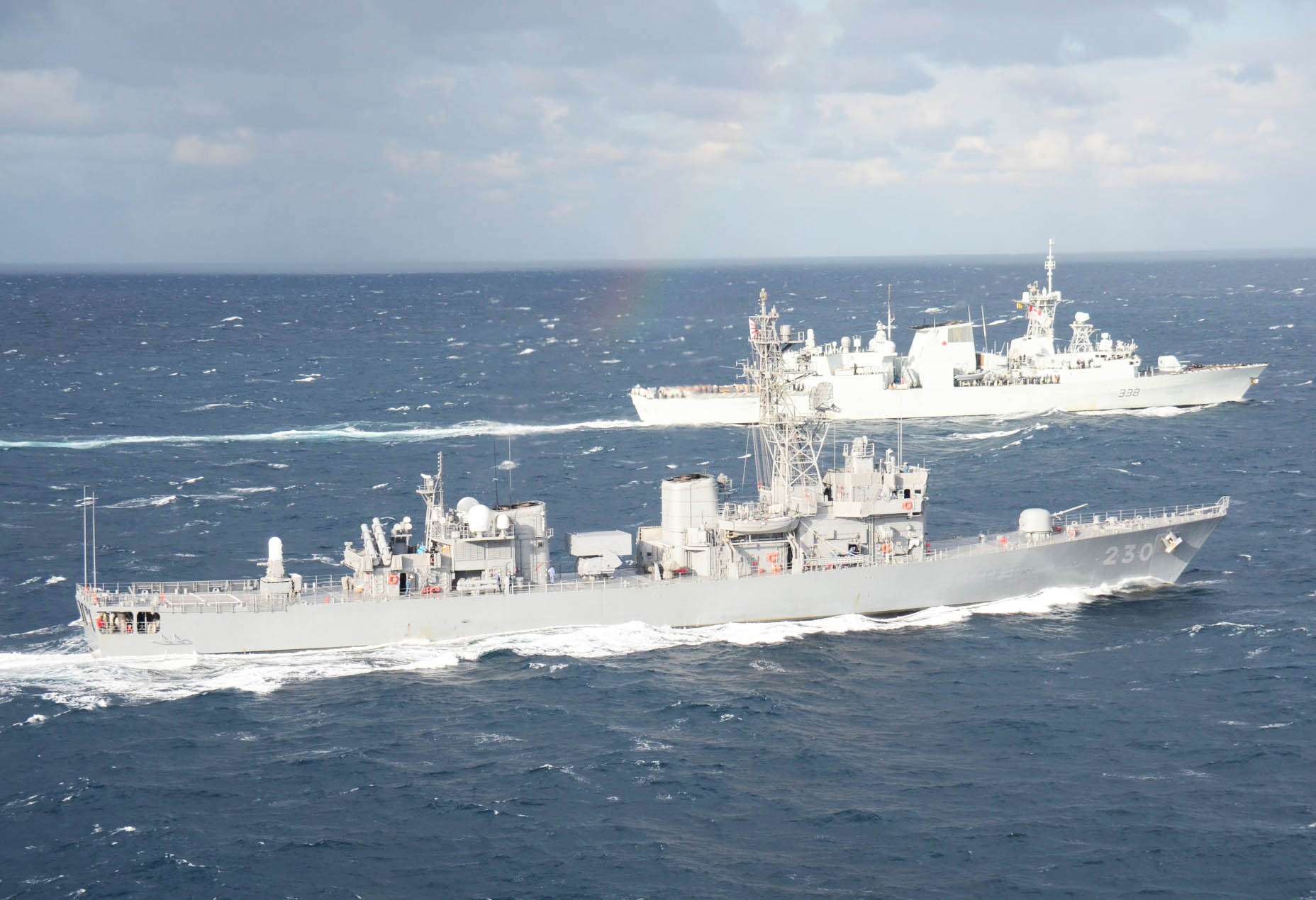
JS Jintsū with HMCS Winnipeg, 10 November 2021.
