= JDS Makigumo =

Yamagumo-class destroyer

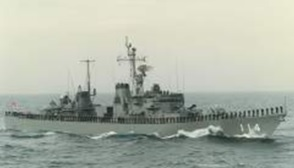
- JDS Makigumo

History

Japan
- Name: Makigumo; (まきぐも)
- Namesake: Makigumo (1941)
- Ordered: 1963
- Builder: Uraga, Uraga
- Laid down: 10 June 1964
- Launched: 26 July 1965
- Commissioned: 19 March 1966
- Decommissioned: 1 August 1995
- Reclassified: TV-3507
- Home port: Kure
- Identification: Pennant number: DD-114
- Fate: Scrapped

General characteristics
- Class & type: Yamagumo-class destroyer
- Displacement: 2,050 long tons (2,083 t) standard
- Length: 114.0 m (374 ft 0 in) overall
- Beam: 11.8 m (38 ft 9 in)
- Draft: 3.9 m (12 ft 10 in)
- Propulsion: 4 × Mitsui 1228 V3 BU-38V diesels; 2 × Mitsui 1628 V3 BU-38V diesels; 2 shafts, 26,000 bhp
- Speed: 27 knots (31 mph; 50 km/h)
- Range: 6,000 nmi (11,000 km)
- Complement: 210
- Sensors & processing systems: AN/SQS-23
- Electronic warfare & decoys: NOLR-1B
- Armament: 4 × Mk.33 3"/50 caliber guns; 1 × ASROC anti-submarine rocket system; 1 × Bofors 375 mm (15 in) ASW rocket launcher; 2 × HOS-301 triple 324 mm (12.8 in) torpedo tubes

JDS Makigumo (DD-114) was the second ship of Yamagumo-class destroyers.

== Construction and career ==
Makigumo was laid down at Uraga Dock Company Uraga Shipyard on 10 June 1964 and launched on 26 July 1965. She was commissioned on 19 March 1966.

On 1 December 1977, the 21st Escort Corps was reorganized under the 3rd Escort Corps group.

In 1985, participated in a practicing voyage to the ocean.

On 20 February 1987, the 21st Escort Corps was reorganized under the Sasebo District Force.

On 20 June 1991, she was reclassified as a training vessel and her registration number changed to TV-3507. She was transferred to the 1st Training Squadron and her home port was transferred to Kure. The remodeling work to a training ship was carried out from 28 June to 24 October of the same year, and the ASROC launcher was used as a trainee auditorium (accommodating 36 people), and a part of the officer's bedroom was for female SDF personnel. It was remodeled to 14 people).

She was removed from the register on 1 August 1995.

== Gallery ==
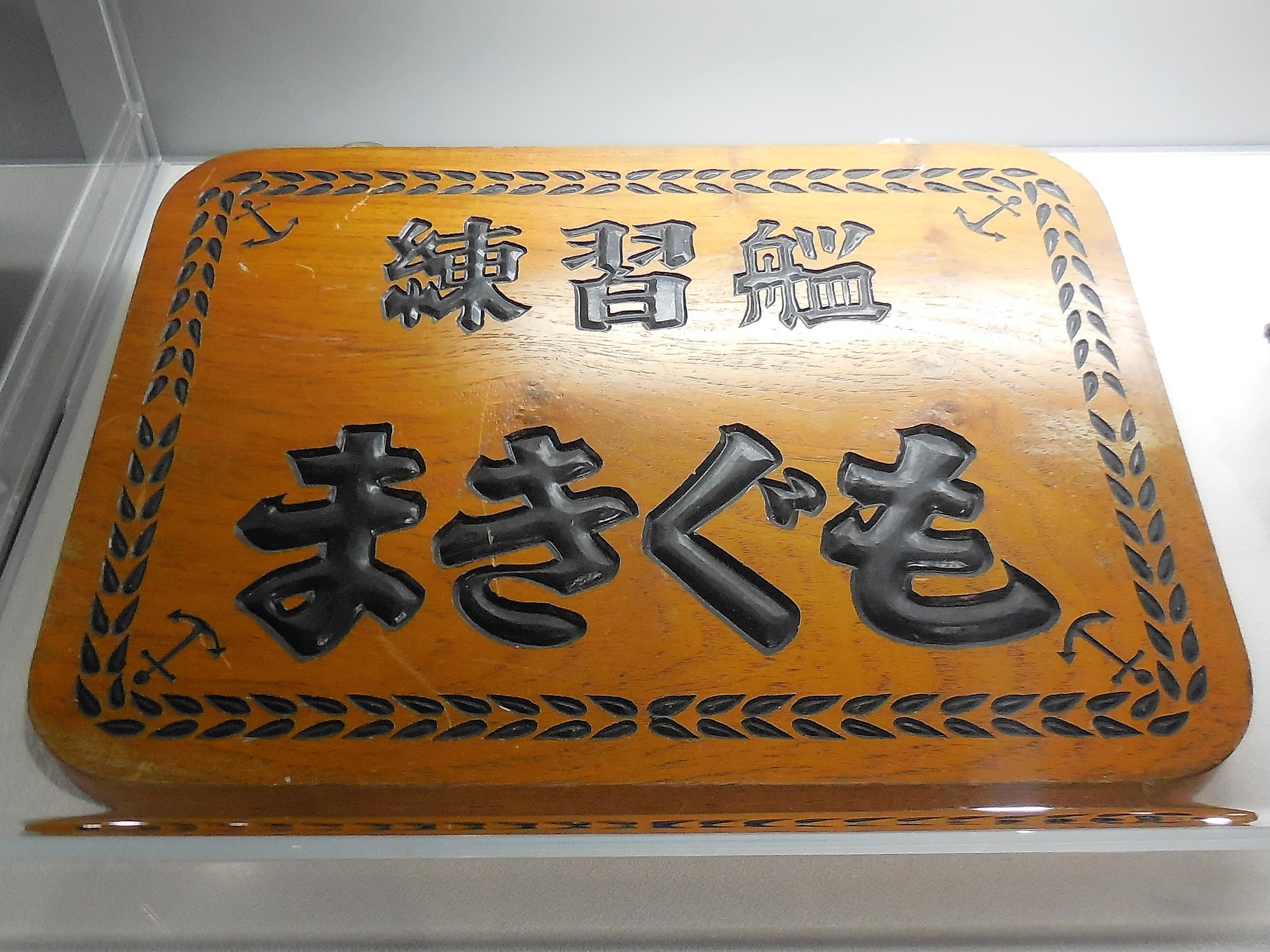
JDS Makigumo's plaque

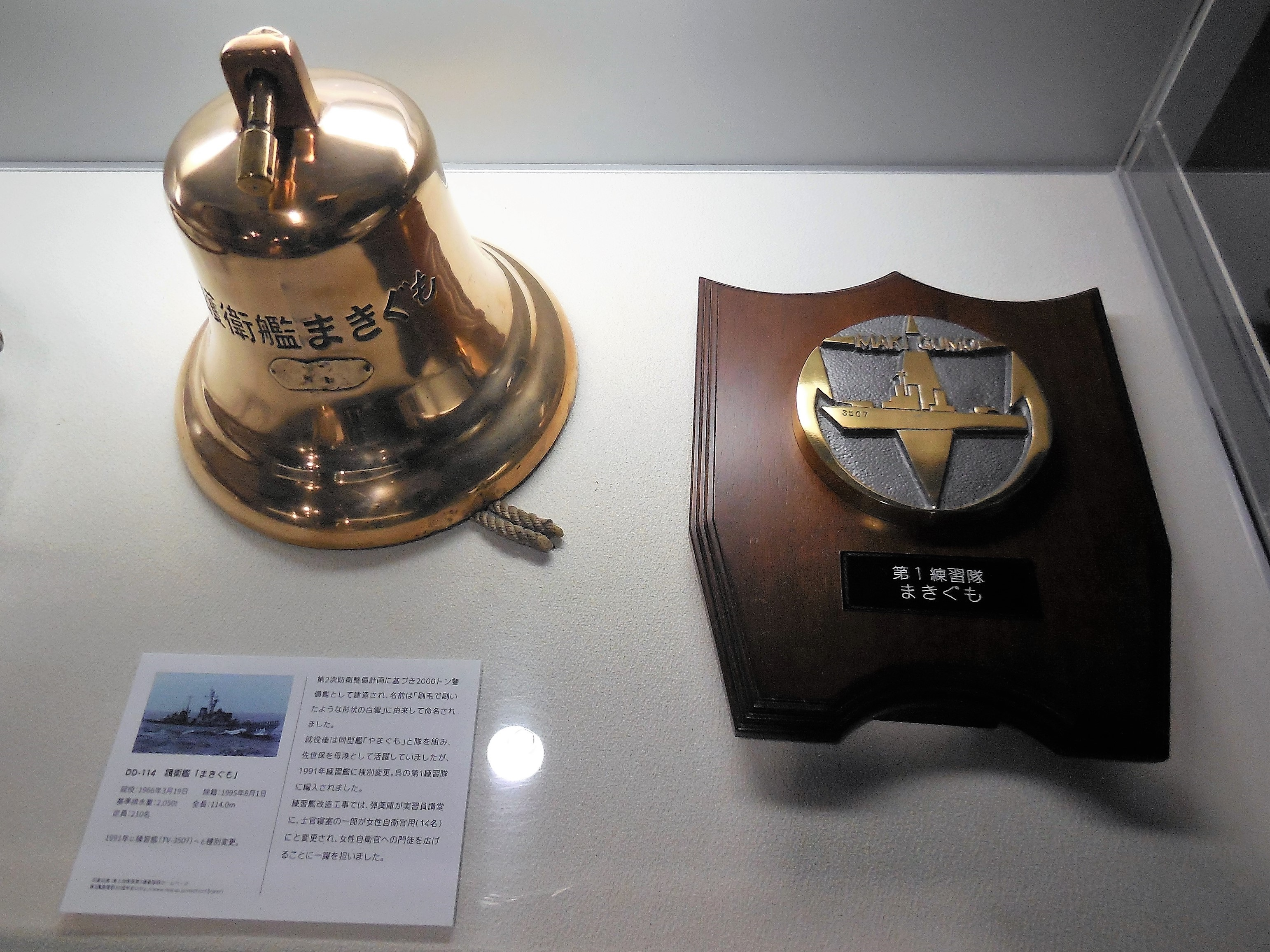
JDS Makigumo's bell and shield

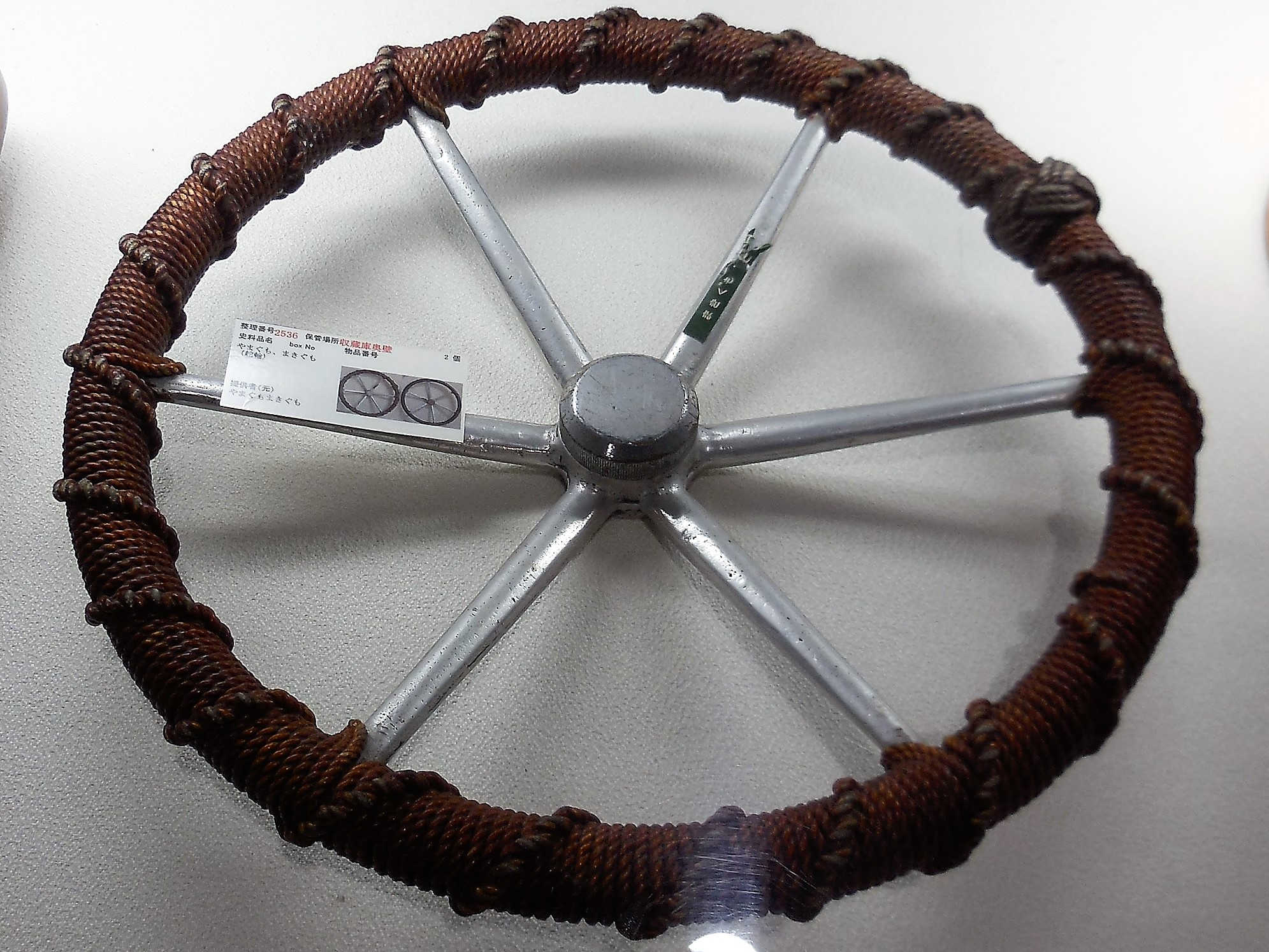
JDS Makigumo's wheel
