= JS Narushio =

Oyashio-class submarines

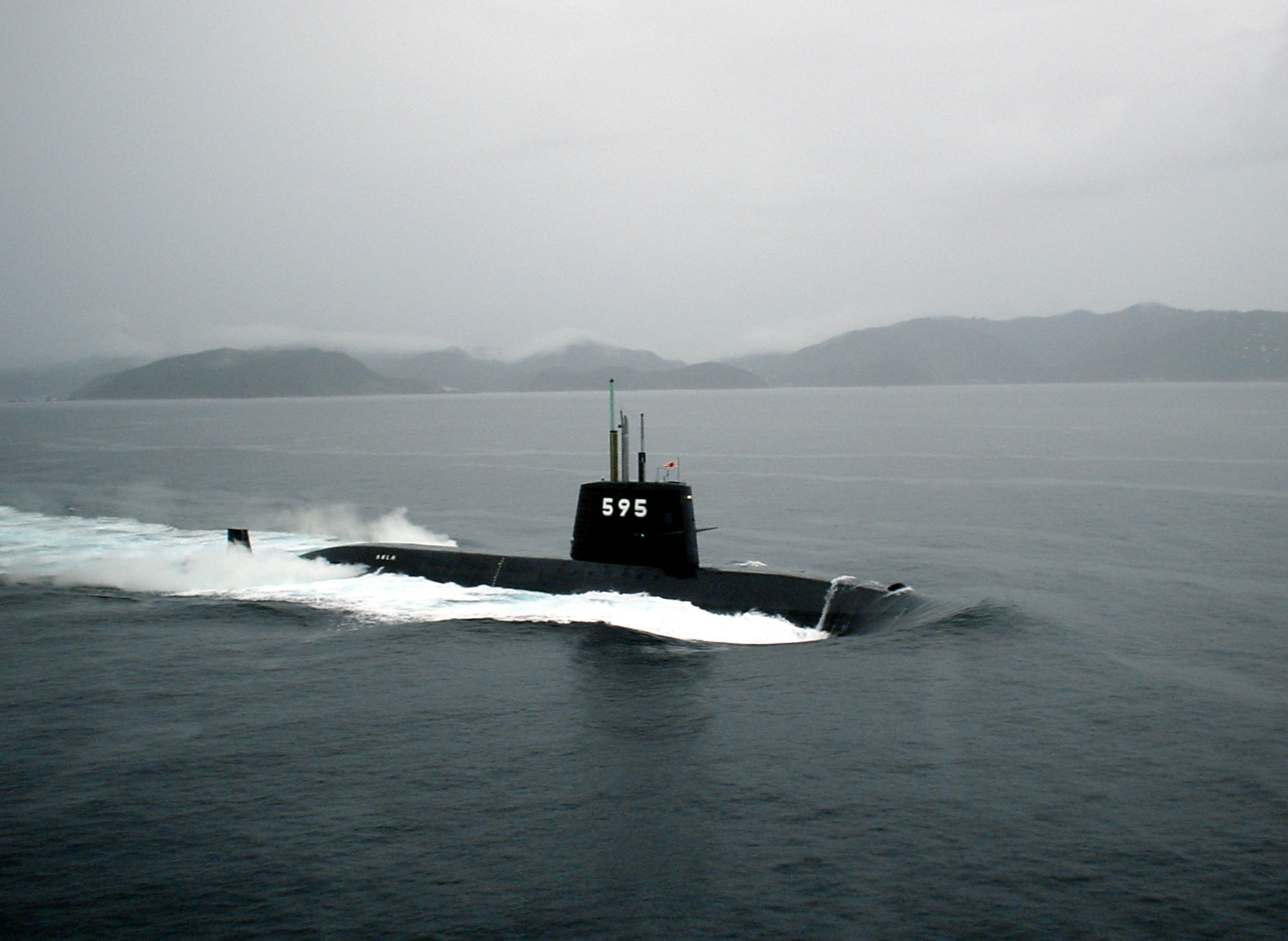
- JS Narushio

History

Japan
- Name: Narushio; (なるしお)
- Ordered: 1998
- Builder: Mitsubishi, Kobe
- Cost: ¥52.19 million
- Laid down: 2 April 1999
- Launched: 4 October 2001
- Commissioned: 3 March 2003
- Home port: Yokosuka
- Identification: Pennant number: SS-595
- Status: Active

General characteristics
- Class & type: Oyashio-class submarine
- Displacement: 2,750 tonnes (surfaced); 4,000 tonnes (submerged)
- Length: 81.7 m (268 ft 1 in)
- Beam: 8.9 m (29 ft 2 in)
- Draught: 7.4 m (24 ft 3 in)
- Propulsion: Diesel-electric; 2 Kawasaki 12V25S diesel engines; 2 Kawasaki alternators; 2 Toshiba motors; 3,400 hp (2,500 kW) surfaced; 7,750 hp (5,780 kW) submerged
- Speed: 12 knots (22 km/h; 14 mph) (surfaced); 20 knots (37 km/h; 23 mph) (submerged)
- Complement: 70 (10 officers)
- Sensors & processing systems: Sonar: Hughes/Oki ZQQ-6 hull-mounted sonar, flank arrays, 1 towed array; Radar: JRC ZPS 6 I-band search radar.
- Armament: 6 × HU-605 21 in (533 mm) torpedo tubes with 20 reloads for: Type 89 torpedoes; UGM-84 Harpoon missiles

JS Narushio (SS-595) is the sixth boat of the Oyashio-class submarines. She was commissioned on 3 March 2003. Narushio is the second-oldest of the Oyashio-class boats still in active service, in commission for 23 years.

== Construction and career ==
Narushio was laid down at Mitsubishi Heavy Industries Kobe Shipyard on 2 April 1999 and launched on 4 October 2001. She was commissioned on 3 March 2003 and deployed to Yokosuka.

The vessel participated in the major naval exercises RIMPAC 2004 and RIMPAC 2008.

== Gallery ==
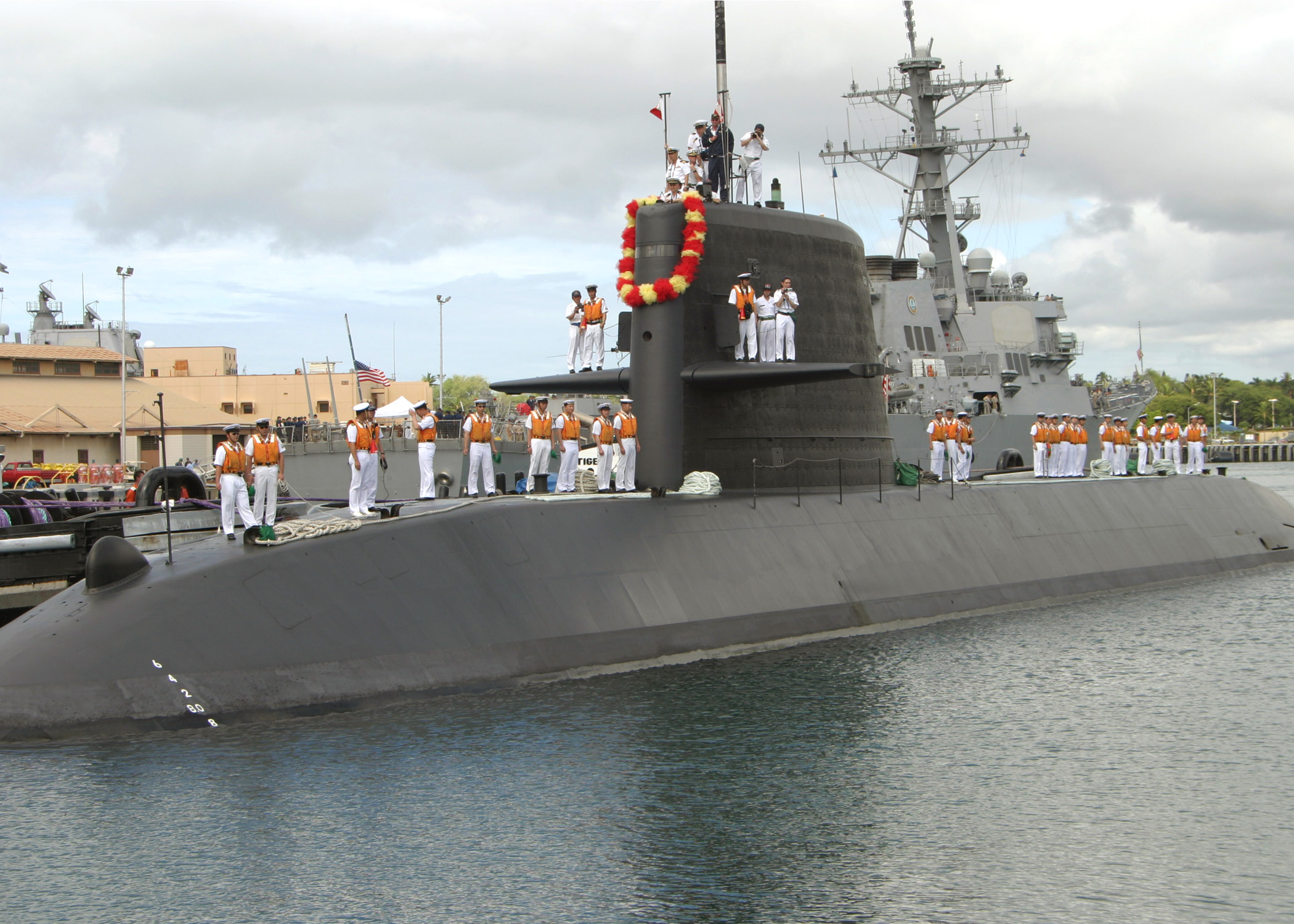
JS Narushio at Pearl Harbor on 22 June 2004.

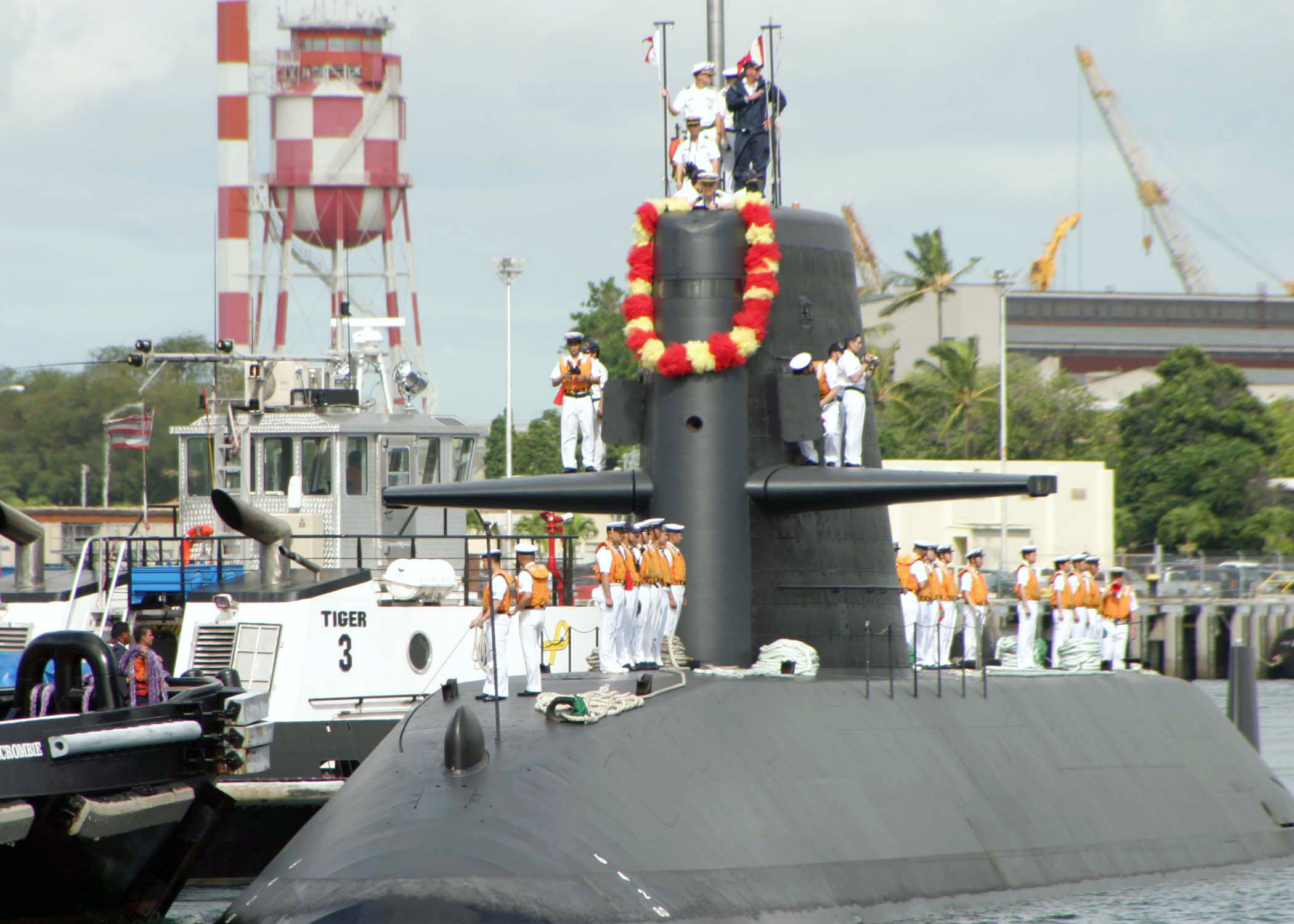
JS Narushio at Pearl Harbor on 22 June 2004.

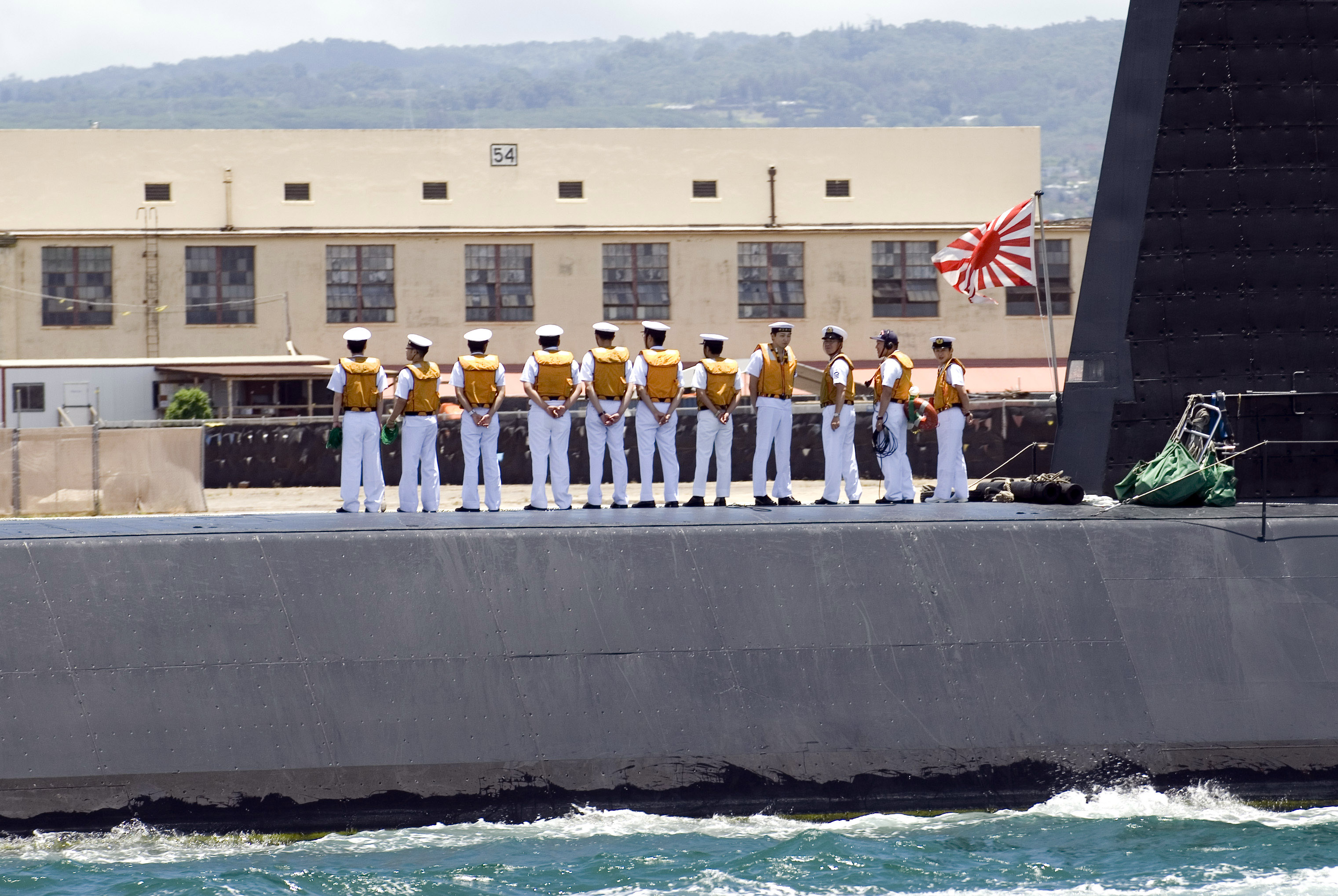
JS Narushio at Pearl Harbor on 22 June 2004.

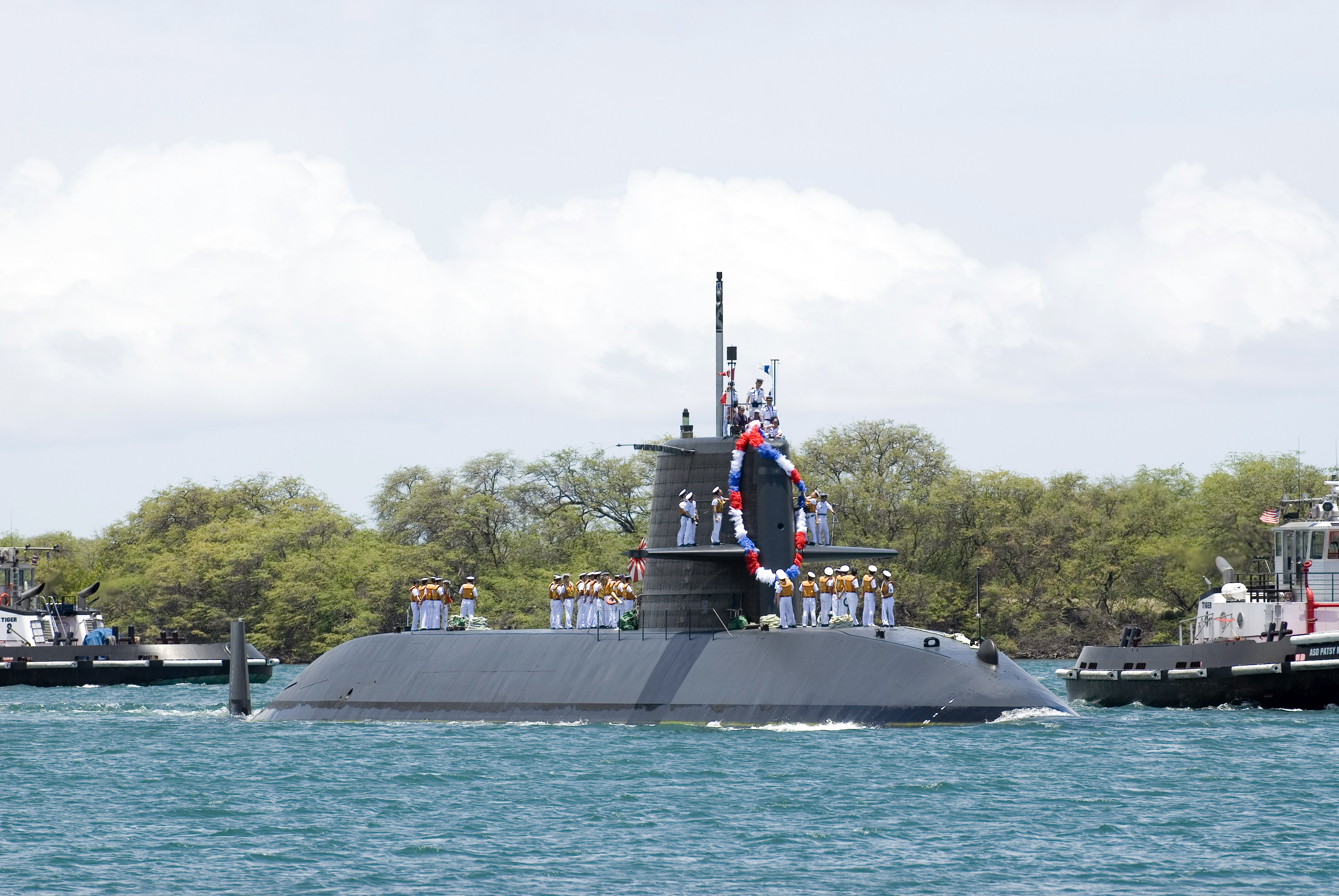
JS Narushio at Pearl Harbor on 26 June 2008.

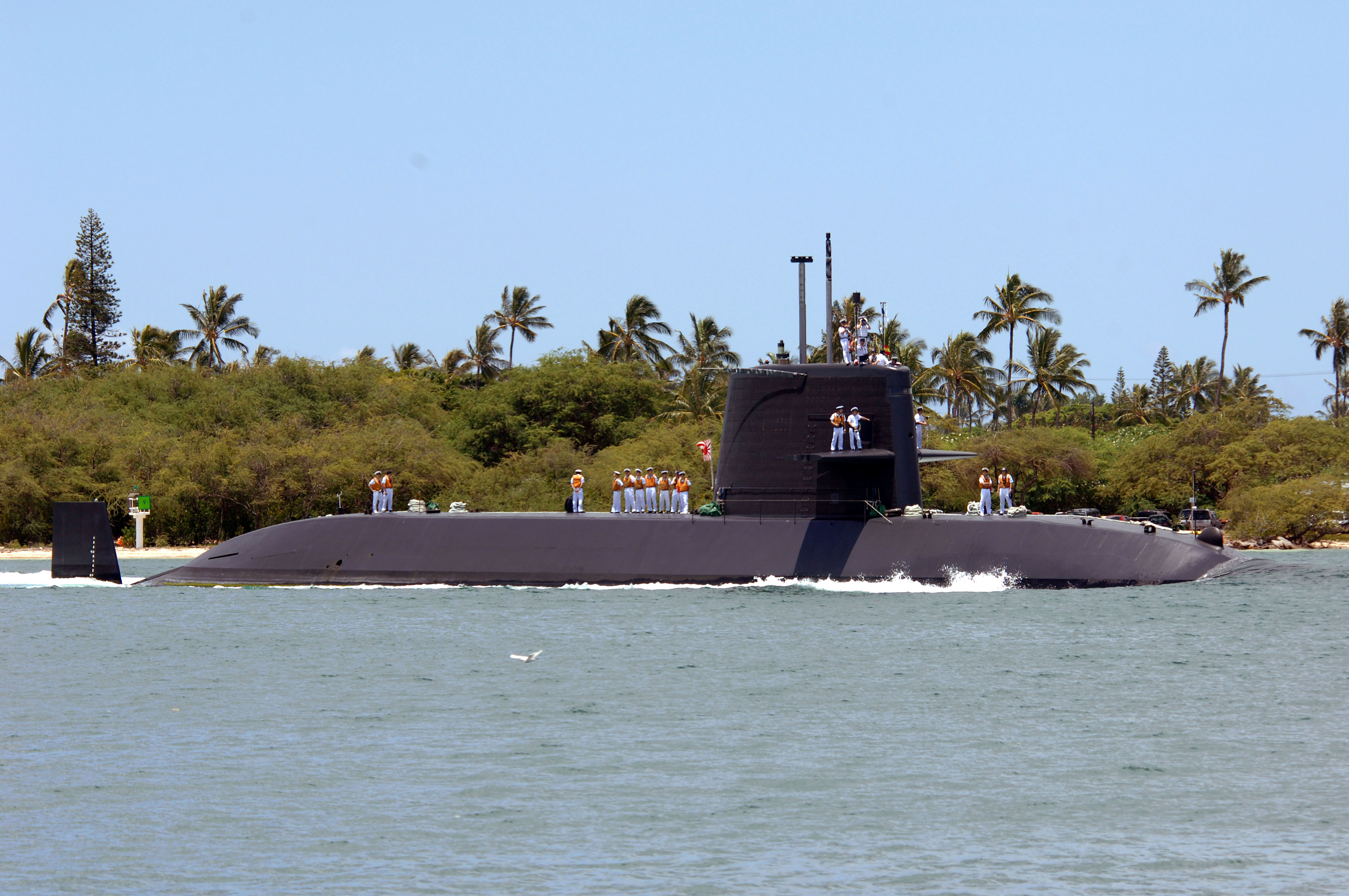
JS Narushio at Pearl Harbor on 26 June 2008.

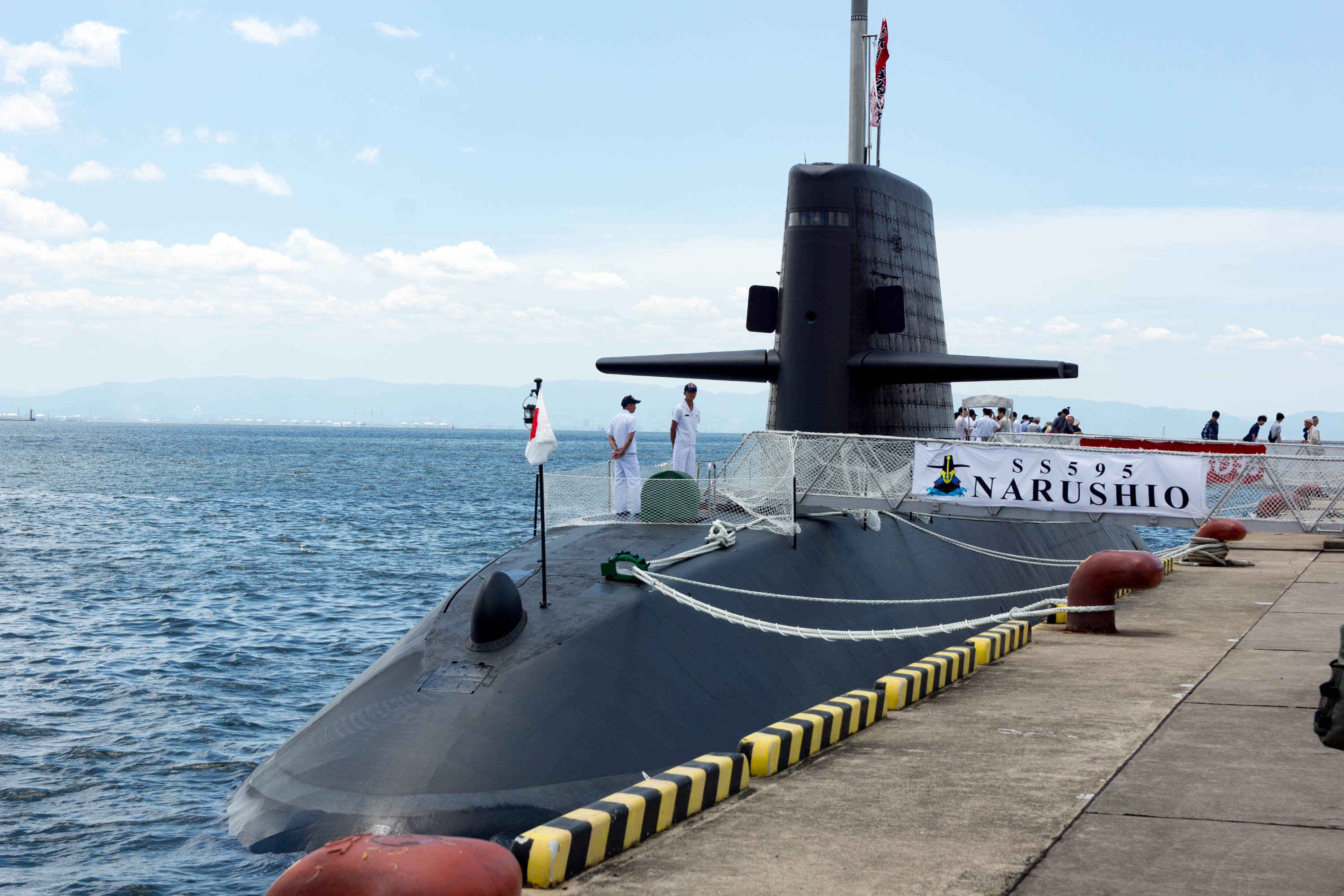
JS Narushio at Hanshin on 4 June 2017.
