= JDS Asagumo =

Yamagumo-class destroyer

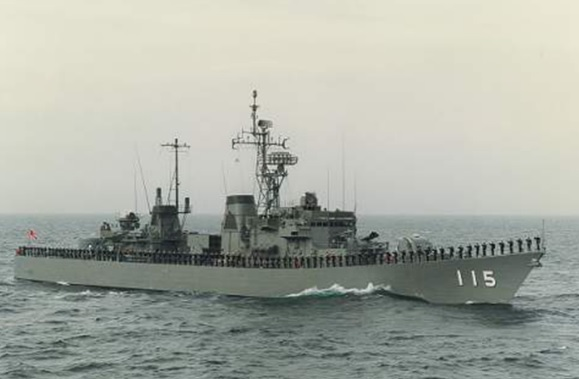
- JDS Asagumo

History

Japan
- Name: Asagumo; (あさぐも)
- Namesake: Asagumo (1937)
- Ordered: 1964
- Builder: Hitachi, Maizuru
- Laid down: 24 June 1965
- Launched: 25 November 1966
- Commissioned: 29 August 1967
- Decommissioned: 23 March 1998
- Reclassified: ASU-7018
- Home port: Kure
- Identification: Pennant number: DD-115
- Fate: Scrapped

General characteristics
- Class & type: Yamagumo-class destroyer
- Displacement: 2,050 long tons (2,083 t) standard
- Length: 114.0 m (374 ft 0 in) overall
- Beam: 11.8 m (38 ft 9 in)
- Draft: 3.9 m (12 ft 10 in)
- Propulsion: 4 × Mitsui 1228 V3 BU-38V diesels; 2 × Mitsui 1628 V3 BU-38V diesels; 2 shafts, 26,000 bhp
- Speed: 27 knots (31 mph; 50 km/h)
- Range: 6,000 nmi (11,000 km)
- Complement: 210
- Sensors & processing systems: AN/SQS-23
- Electronic warfare & decoys: NOLR-1B
- Armament: 4 × Mk.33 3"/50 caliber guns; 1 × ASROC anti-submarine rocket system; 1 × Bofors 375 mm (15 in) ASW rocket launcher; 2 × HOS-301 triple 324 mm (12.8 in) torpedo tubes

JDS Asagumo (DD-115) was the third ship of Yamagumo-class destroyers.

== Construction and career ==
Asagumo was laid down at Hitachi Zosen Corporation Maizuru Shipyard on 24 June 1965 and launched on 25 November 1966. She was commissioned on 29 August 1967.

On 25 November 1972, the 23rd Escort Corps was newly formed under the 2nd Escort Corps group, and was incorporated with JDS Aokumo commissioned on the same day.

On 27 March 1982, she was transferred to the 21st Escort Corps of the 3rd Escort Corps. In the same year, she participated in a practicing voyage to the ocean.

On 20 February 1987, the 21st Escort Corps was reorganized under the Sasebo District Force.

On 15 March 1991, she was transferred to the 22nd Kure District Force Escort Corps, and her home port was also transferred to Kure.

On 18 October 1993, she was reclassified as a special service ship and her registration number was changed to ASU-7018. She was transferred to the 1st Submarine Group as a ship under direct control. In addition, she was remodeled into a special service ship, and a collection facility for training torpedoes was set up in the central part of her port side.

Removed from the register on 24 March 1998.
