= Yamagumo-class destroyer =

Japanese class of naval vessels

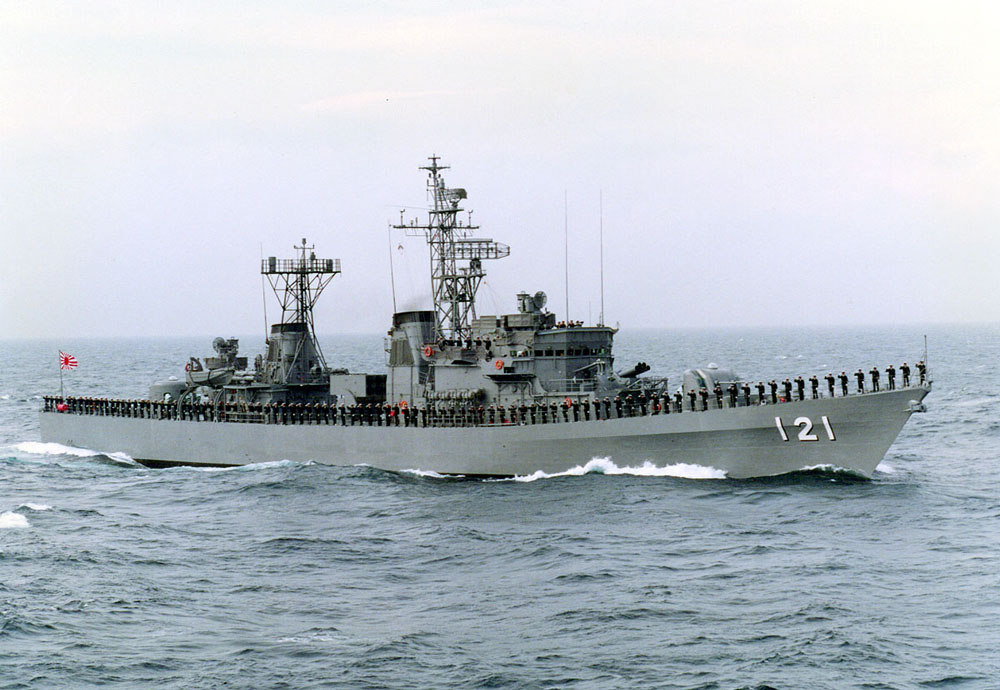
- JDS Yūgumo (DD-121)

Class overview
- Name: Yamagumo class
- Builders: Sumitomo Heavy Industries (3); Maizuri Heavy Industries (1); Mitsui Shipbuilding & Eng. Co (1); Uraga Heavy Industries (1)
- Operators: Japan Maritime Self-Defense Force
- Preceded by: (the earlier batch) Akizuki class; (the latter batch) Minegumo-class destroyer
- Succeeded by: (the earlier batch) Takatsuki class; (the latter batch) Hatsuyuki class
- Subclasses: Yamagumo class (Earlier batch); Aokumo class (Latter batch)
- Built: 1964–1977
- In commission: 1966–2005
- Completed: 6
- Retired: 6

General characteristics
- Type: Destroyer
- Displacement: Yamagumo class; 2,050 long tons (2,083 t) standard; Aokumo and Akigumo; 2,150 long tons (2,185 t) standard; Yūgumo; 2,200 long tons (2,235 t) standard
- Length: Yamagumo class; 114.0 m (374 ft 0 in) overall; Aokumo class; 115.2 m (377 ft 11 in) overall
- Beam: 11.8 m (38 ft 9 in)
- Draft: Yamagumo class; 3.9 m (12 ft 10 in); Aokumo class; 4.0 m (13 ft 1 in)
- Propulsion: Yamagumo; 4 × Mitsui 1228 V3 BU-38V diesels; 2 × Mitsui 1628 V3 BU-38V diesels; 2 shafts, 26,000 bhp; Makigumo and Akigumo; 6 × Mitsubishi 12 UEV 30/40 diesels; Aokumo class; 6 × Mitsubishi 12 UEV 30/40N diesels
- Speed: Yūgumo; 28 knots (32 mph; 52 km/h); all others; 27 knots (31 mph; 50 km/h)
- Range: 6,000 nmi (11,000 km)
- Complement: Yamagumo class; 210; Aokumo class; 220
- Sensors & processing systems: Yamagumo class; AN/SQS-23; Mark 56 fire-control system; Mark 63 fire-control system; Aokumo class; OQS-3 (Type 66 passive sonar); VDS AN/SQS-35(J)
- Electronic warfare & decoys: OPS-11B, OPS-17; Akigumo and Yūgumo; NOLR-6; all others; NOLR-1B
- Armament: 4 × Mk.33 3"/50 caliber guns; 1 × ASROC anti-submarine rocket system; 1 × 4 Bofors 375 mm (15 in) ASW rocket launcher; 2 × HOS-301 triple 324 mm (12.8 in) torpedo tubes

The Yamagumo class are vessels of the Japanese Maritime Self-Defense Force, usually classified as a destroyer, but due to their relatively light displacement, in other sources as a destroyer escort. This class is the successor of the Akizuki class.

== Design ==
This class was planned to become the new generation workhorse of the fleet of the JMSDF. In support of this objective, it was equipped with some new generation weapon and sensor systems such as the ASROC anti-submarine rocket and the OPS-11 early warning radar (Japanese equivalent of the American AN/SPS-40 radar).

The Minegumo-class destroyer derived from this class as the new DASH equipped version, but after the QH-50D DASH was scrapped, the JMSDF decided on resuming the construction of this class. The latter batch sometimes called as the Aokumo class, and there are some improvements, mainly in their electronics such as the OQS-3 hull-sonar (Japanese variant of the American AN/SQS-23) and the AN/SQS-35 variable depth sonar system.

== Ships ==
Batch	Building no.	Pennant no.	Name	Builder	Laid down	Launched	Commissioned	Decommissioned
Earlier	2201	DD-113; TV-3506	Yamagumo	Mitsui, Tamano ship yard	March 23, 1964	February 27, 1965	January 29, 1966	1995
Earlier	2202	DD-114; TV-3507	Makigumo	Uraga Heavy Industries, Uraga ship yard	June 10, 1964	July 26, 1967	March 19, 1966	1995
Earlier	2203	DD-115; ASU-7018	Asagumo	Maizuru Heavy Industries, Maizuru ship yard	June 24, 1965	November 25, 1966	August 29, 1967	1998
Latter	2207	DD-119; TV-3512	Aokumo	Sumitomo, Uraga ship yard	October 2, 1970	March 30, 1972	November 25, 1972	2003
Latter	2208	DD-120; TV-3514	Akigumo	Sumitomo, Uraga ship yard	July 7, 1972	October 23, 1973	July 24, 1974	2005
Latter	2209	DD-121	Yūgumo	Sumitomo, Uraga ship yard	February 4, 1976	May 21, 1977	March 24, 1978	2005

== See also ==
- List of destroyer classes

Equivalent destroyers of the same era

- Chungmu class
- Friesland class
- Impetuoso class
- Kotlin class
