= List of destroyers of Japan =

The following is a list of destroyers and 1st class (steam) torpedo boats of Japan grouped by class or design. In naval terminology, a destroyer is a fast and maneuverable yet long-endurance warship intended to escort larger vessels in a fleet, convoy or battle group and defend them against smaller, powerful, short-range attackers. The Japanese torpedo boat Kotaka of 1885 was "the forerunner of torpedo boat destroyers that appeared a decade later". They were designed to Japanese specifications and ordered from the London Yarrow shipyards in 1885. The Yarrow shipyards, builder of the parts for the Kotaka, "considered Japan to have effectively invented the destroyer".

== Imperial Japanese Navy ==
=== Russo-Japanese War ===
These twenty-three 'turtle-back' destroyers, all authorised under the Ten Year Naval Expansion Programme of 1898, comprised six Ikazuchi class built by Yarrow and six Murakumo class built by Thornycroft in the UK, each carrying 1 × 12-pdr (aft) and 5 x 6-pdr guns and 2 × 18 in torpedo tubes, and followed by two larger ships from each of the same builders (the Shirakumo class from Thornycroft and the Akatsuki class from Yarrow), in which a second 12-pdr replaced the foremost 6-pdr, and finally by seven Harusame class built in Japan. All were later rated as 3rd Class destroyers (under 600 tons each). The programme also included sixteen First Class torpedo boats, included below (47 smaller 2nd and 3rd Class boats from this Programme are not included)

==== Murakumo class — 6 ships ====
Name	Kanji	Builder	Laid down	Launched	Completed	Fate
Murakumo	叢雲	Thornycroft, Chiswick, UK	1 October 1897	16 November 1898	29 December 1898	depot vessel 1 April 1919, auxiliary minesweeper 1 July 1920; dispatch vessel 1 April 1922, scuttled 4 June 1925
Shinonome	東雲	Thornycroft, Chiswick, UK	1 October 1897	14 December 1898	1 February 1899	wrecked off Taiwan 23 July 1913; written off 6 August 1913
Yūgiri	夕霧	Thornycroft, Chiswick, UK	1 November 1897	26 January 1899	10 March 1899	depot vessel 1 April 1919, auxiliary minesweeper 1 July 1920; Broken up 1 April 1922
Shiranui	不知火	Thornycroft, Chiswick, UK	1 January 1898	15 March 1899	13 May 1899	minesweeper 1 April 1922, dispatch vessel 1 August 1923; Broken up 25 February 1925
Kagerō	陽炎	Thornycroft, Chiswick, UK	1 August 1898	23 October 1899	31 October 1899	Dispatch vessel 21 April 1922; Broken up 25 February 1925
Usugumo	薄雲	Thornycroft, Chiswick, UK	1 September 1898	16 January 1900	1 February 1900	minesweeper 1 April 1922, dispatch vessel 1 August 1923; scuttled 29 April 1925

==== Ikazuchi class — 6 ships ====
Name	Kanji	Builder	Laid down	Launched	Completed	Fate
Ikazuki	雷	Yarrow & Company, Poplar, London	1 September 1897	15 November 1898	23 February 1899	Boiler explosion at Ominato 9 October 1913, written off 5 November 1913, scrapped 29 April 1914
Inazuma	電	Yarrow & Company, Poplar, London	1 November 1897	28 January 1899	25 April 1899	Lost in collision off Hakodate 16 December 1909, written off 15 September 1910
Akebono	曙	Yarrow & Company, Poplar, London	1 February 1898	25 April 1899	3 July 1899	Retired 18 October 1921, scrapped 2 May 1925
Sazanami	漣	Yarrow & Company, Poplar, London	1 June 1897	8 August 1899	28 August 1899	Retired 1 April 1913, sold 23 August 1914 as MV Sazanami Maru
Niji	霓	Yarrow & Company, Poplar, London	1 January 1899	22 June 1899	29 July 1899	Grounded off Shantung Peninsula 29 July 1900, written off 8 April 1901
Oboro	朧	Yarrow & Company, Poplar, London	1 January 1899	5 October 1899	1 November 1899	Retired 21 June 1921, scrapped 1926

==== Shirataka class – 1 1st class torpedo boat ====
Name	Kanji	Builder	Laid down	Launched	Completed	Fate
Shirataka	白鷹	Schichau-Werke, Danzig, Germany	3 March 1899	10 June 1899	22 June 1900	Utility vessel 15 November 1923, sold for scrap 6 April 1927

==== Hayabusa class – 15 1st class torpedo boats ====
Name	Kanji	Builder	Laid down	Launched	Completed	Fate
Hayabusa	隼	Normand Shipyard, Le Havre, France	15 March 1899	16 December 1899	19 April 1900	Utility vessel 1 April 1919, scrapped 14 September 1922
Manazuru	真鶴	Normand Shipyard, Le Havre, France	9 October 1899	27 June 1900	7 November 1900	Utility vessel 1 April 1919, scrapped 17 December 1925
Kasasaki	鵲	Normand Shipyard, Le Havre, France	26 December 1899	30 June 1900	30 November 1900	Utility vessel 1 April 1919, scrapped 17 December 1925
Chidori	千鳥	Normand Shipyard, Le Havre, France	11 June 1900	27 January 1901	9 April 1901	Utility vessel 1 April 1913, scrapped 27 February 1923
Kari	雁	Kure Naval Arsenal, Kure, Hiroshima	5 April 1902	14 March 1903	25 July 1903	Utility vessel 1 April 1922, scrapped 19 February 1930
Aotaka	蒼鷹	Kure Naval Arsenal, Kure, Hiroshima	15 April 1902	14 March 1903	1 August 1903	Utility vessel 1 April 1922, scrapped 19 September 1927
Hato	鴿	Kure Naval Arsenal, Kure, Hiroshima	22 May 1902	22 August 1903	22 October 1903	Utility vessel 1 April 1922, scrapped 10 July 1926
Tsubame	燕	Kure Naval Arsenal, Kure, Hiroshima	2 June 1902	21 October 1903	24 November 1903	Utility vessel 1 April 1922, scrapped 15 July 1925
Hibari	雲雀	Kure Naval Arsenal, Kure, Hiroshima	25 July 1902	21 October 1903	10 January 1904	Utility vessel 1 April 1922, scrapped 14 February 1925
Kiji	雉	Kure Naval Arsenal, Kure, Hiroshima	2 September 1902; 14 June 1904	5 November 1903; 18 April 1905	23 January 1904; 9 May 1905	Ran aground 31 March 1904, only hull was scrapped and ship was rebuilt using parts from the original hull, Utility vessel 15 December 1923, scrapped 2 October 1926
Hashitake	鷂	Kawasaki Dockyards, Kobe	14 June 1903	30 December 1903	27 February 1904	Utility vessel 1 April 1923, scrapped 15 July 1926
Sagi	鷺	Kawasaki Dockyards, Kobe	4 October 1902	21 December 1903	22 March 1904	Utility vessel 1 April 1923, scrapped 14 February 1925
Uzura	鶉	Kawasaki Dockyards, Kobe	20 January 1903	29 February 1904	22 April 1904	Utility vessel 1 April 1923, scrapped 30 September 1932
Kamome	鴎	Kawasaki Dockyards, Kobe	24 February 1903	30 April 1904	4 June 1904	Utility vessel 15 December 1923, scrapped 18 September 1926
Ōtori	鴻	Kawasaki Dockyards, Kobe	14 June 1903	29 February 1904	4 June 1904	Utility vessel 15 December 1923, scrapped 15 September 1926

==== Shirakumo class — 2 ships ====
Name	Kanji	Builder	Laid down	Launched	Completed	Fate
Shirakumo	白雲	Thornycroft, Chiswick, United Kingdom	1 February 1901	1 October 1901	13 February 1902	auxiliary minesweeper 1 April 1922; utility vessel 1 April 1923; sold 21 July 1925
Asashio	朝潮	Thornycroft, Chiswick, United Kingdom	3 April 1901	10 January 1902	4 May 1902	auxiliary minesweeper 1 April 1922, utility vessel 1 April 1923; sold 5 April 1926

==== Akatsuki class – 2 ships ====
Name	Kanji	Builder	Laid down	Launched	Completed	Fate
Akatsuki	暁	Yarrow & Co, Cubitt Town, London	10 December 1900	13 February 1901	14 December 1901	mined off Port Arthur 17 May 1904, written off 19 October 1905
Kasumi	霞	Yarrow & Co, Cubitt Town, London	1 February 1901	23 January 1902	14 February 1902	demilitarized 1 April 1913, scrapped 1 July 1920

==== Harusame class — 7 ships ====
Name	Kanji	Builder	Laid down	Launched	Completed	Fate
Harusame	春雨	Yokosuka Naval Arsenal, Yokosuka	1 February 1902	31 October 1902	26 June 1903	ran aground 24 November 1911, written off 28 December 1911, wreck broken up 1 August 1926
Murasame	村雨	Yokosuka Naval Arsenal, Yokosuka	20 March 1902	29 November 1902	7 July 1903	auxiliary minesweeper 1 April 1922, decommissioned 1 April 1923, broken up 14 February 1926
Hayatori	速鳥	Yokosuka Naval Arsenal, Yokosuka	15 April 1902	12 March 1903	24 August 1903	mined off Port Arthur 3 September 1904; struck 15 June 1905
Asagiri	朝霧	Yokosuka Naval Arsenal, Yokosuka	15 April 1902	15 April 1903	18 September 1903	auxiliary minesweeper 1 April 1922, decommissioned 1 April 1923; broken up 14 February 1926
Ariake	有明	Kure Naval Arsenal, Kure, Hiroshima	30 June 1904	17 December 1904	15 March 1905	retired 1 December 1924, struck from Navy List 10 April 1925; Transferred to Home Ministry as a police boat 12 November 1925
Fubuki	吹雪	Kure Naval Arsenal, Kure, Hiroshima	29 September 1904	21 January 1905	28 February 1905	Stricken on 10 April 1925 and broken up in 1926
Arare	霰	Kure Naval Arsenal, Kure, Hiroshima	29 October 1904	5 April 1905	10 May 1905	Stricken on 1 April 1924 and broken up in 1926

==== Sokol class — 1 ship ====
Name	Kanji	Builder	Laid down	Launched	Completed	Fate
Akatsuki	暁	Izhorskiye Zavody, Saint Petersburg, Russia	1897 or 1900	26 July 1901	27 June 1903	Originally Imperial Russian Navy destroyer Reshitel'nyi. Captured 12 August 1904. Renamed Yamabiko or Yamahiko 19 October 1905. Broken up 1918 or 1919

=== World War I ===
Before and during World War I, Japan established three grades of destroyers - the large (over 1,000 tons) 1st Class or ocean-going type, the medium (600 to 1,000 tons) 2nd Class type and the small (below 600 tons) 3rd Class type. Between 1904 and 1918, Japan built thirty-two 3rd Class destroyers (the Kamikaze class), twenty-two 2nd Class destroyers (the Sakura, Kaba, Momo and Enoki classes) and eight 1st Class destroyers (the Umikaze, Isokaze and Kawakaze classes). They also purchased two further 1st Class destroyers (the Urakaze class) built in the UK by Yarrow.

==== Kamikaze class – 32 ships ====
Name	Kanji	Builder	Laid down	Launched	Completed	Fate
Kamikaze	神風	Yokosuka Naval Arsenal, Yokosuka	20 August 1904	15 July 1905	16 August 1905	Minesweeper 1 December 1924; Broken up 1 April 1928
Hatsushimo	初霜	Yokosuka Naval Arsenal, Yokosuka	20 August 1904	13 May 1905	18 August 1905	Minesweeper 1 December 1924; Broken up 1 April 1928
Yayoi	弥生	Yokosuka Naval Arsenal, Yokosuka	20 August 1904	7 August 1905	23 September 1905	Retired 1 December 1924; expended as a target 10 August 1926
Ushio	潮	Kure Naval Arsenal, Kure, Hiroshima	12 April 1905	30 August 1905	1 October 1905	Minesweeper 1 December 1924; Broken up 1 April 1928
Nenohi	子日	Kure Naval Arsenal, Kure, Hiroshima	25 June 1905	30 August 1905	1 October 1905	Minesweeper 1 December 1924; Broken up 1 April 1928
Kisaragi	如月	Yokosuka Naval Arsenal, Yokosuka	10 September 1904	6 September 1905	19 October 1905	Minesweeper 1 December 1924; Broken up 1 April 1928
Wakaba	若葉	Yokosuka Naval Arsenal, Yokosuka	20 May 1905	25 November 1905	28 February 1906	Minesweeper 1 December 1924; Broken up 1 April 1928
Asakaze	朝風	Mitsubishi shipyards, Nagasaki	30 December 1904	28 October 1905	1 April 1906	Minesweeper 1 December 1924; struck 1 April 1928, expended as a target 1 August 1929
Harukaze	春風	Kawasaki Dockyards, Kobe	16 February 1905	25 December 1905	14 May 1906	To Reserves 1 December 1924; Broken up 1 April 1928
Hatsuyuki	初雪	Yokosuka Naval Arsenal, Yokosuka	11 September 1905	8 March 1906	17 May 1906	Minesweeper 1 December 1924; Broken up 1 April 1928
Yūgure	夕暮	Sasebo Naval Arsenal, Sasebo, Nagasaki	1 March 1905	17 November 1905	26 May 1906	Minesweeper 1 December 1924; scrapped 1928
Shigure	時雨	Kawasaki Dockyards, Kobe	3 June 1905	12 March 1906	11 July 1906	Scrapped 1 December 1924
Yūdachi	夕立	Sasebo Naval Arsenal, Sasebo, Nagasaki	20 March 1905	26 March 1906	16 July 1906	Minesweeper 1 December 1924; BU 1 April 1928
Oite	追手	Maizuru Naval Arsenal, Maizuru, Kyoto	1 August 1905	10 January 1906	21 August 1906	Broken up 1 December 1924
Shiratsuyu	白露	Mitsubishi Shipyards, Nagasaki	25 February 1905	12 February 1906	23 August 1906	To Reserves 1 December 1924; Scrapped 1930
Hibiki	響	Yokosuka Naval Arsenal, Yokosuka	28 September 1905	31 March 1906	6 September 1906	Minesweeper 1 December 1924; Broken up 1 April 1928
Mikazuki	三日月	Sasebo Naval Arsenal, Sasebo, Nagasaki	1 June 1905	26 May 1906	12 September 1906	Scrapped 1928
Shirayuki	白雪	Mitsubishi Shipyards, Nagasaki	24 March 1905	19 May 1906	12 October 1906	To Reserves 1 December 1924; Broken up 1 April 1928
Nowaki	野分	Sasebo Naval Arsenal, Sasebo, Nagasaki	1 August 1905	25 July 1906	1 November 1906	Broken up 1 December 1924
Asatsuyu	朝露	Osaka Iron Works, Osaka	28 April 1905	2 April 1906	16 November 1906	Wrecked at Nanao Bay 9 November 1913; struck 15 April 1914
Yūnagi	夕凪	Maizuru Naval Arsenal, Maizuru, Kyoto	20 January 1906	22 August 1906	25 December 1906	Broken up 1 December 1924
Shirotae	白妙	Yokosuka Naval Arsenal, Yokosuka	24 March 1905	30 July 1906	21 January 1907	Combat loss off Shantung Peninsula 4 September 1914; written off 29 October 1914
Minatsuki	水無月	Mitsubishi Shipyards, Nagasaki	25 February 1906	5 November 1906	14 February 1907	Minesweeper 1 December 1924, renamed W-10 1 August 1928; scrapped 1930
Hatsuharu	初春	Kawasaki Dockyards, Kobe	11 November 1905	21 May 1906	1 March 1907	Retired 1 December 1924; expended as a target 13 August 1928
Uzuki	卯月	Kawasaki Dockyards, Kobe	22 March 1906	20 September 1906	6 March 1907	Reclassified as a radio-controlled target ship, January 1929
Matsukaze	松風	Mitsubishi Shipyards, Nagasaki	25 September 1905	23 December 1906	15 March 1907	To Reserves 1 December 1924; Broken up 1 April 1928
Hayate	疾風	Osaka Iron Works, Osaka	25 September 1905	22 May 1906	13 June 1907	Broken up 1 December 1924
Nagatsuki	長月	Uraga Dock Company, Uraga, Yokosuka	28 October 1905	15 December 1906	31 July 1907	Minesweeper 1 December 1924, renamed W-11 1 August 1928; retired 1 June 1930
Kikutsuki	菊月	Uraga Dock Company, Uraga, Yokosuka	2 March 1906	10 April 1907	20 September 1907	Minesweeper 1 December 1924, renamed W-12 1 August 1928; retired 1 June 1930
Uranami	浦波	Maizuru Naval Arsenal, Maizuru, Kyoto	1 May 1907	8 December 1907	2 October 1908	Minesweeper 1 December 1924, renamed W-8 1 August 1928; utility vessel 1 June 1930, scrapped 1935
Isonami	磯波	Maizuru Naval Arsenal, Maizuru, Kyoto	15 January 1908	21 November 1908	2 April 1909	Minesweeper 1 December 1924, renamed W-7 1 August 1928; utility vessel 1 June 1930
Ayanami	綾波	Maizuru Naval Arsenal, Maizuru, Kyoto	15 May 1908	20 March 1909	26 June 1909	Minesweeper 1 December 1924, renamed W-9 1 August 1928; utility vessel 1 June 1930

==== Umikaze class — 2 ships ====
Name	Kanji	Builder	Laid down	Launched	Completed	Fate
Umikaze	海風	Maizuru Naval Arsenal, Maizuru, Kyoto	23 November 1909	10 October 1910	28 September 1911	Converted to minesweeper and renamed W-7 1 June 1930, scrapped 1 April 1936
Yamakaze	山風	Mitsubishi shipyards, Nagasaki	1 June 1910	21 January 1911	21 October 1911	Converted to minesweeper and renamed W-8 1 June 1930, scrapped 1 April 1936

==== Sakura class — 2 ships ====
Name	Kanji	Builder	Laid down	Launched	Completed	Fate
Sakura	櫻	Maizuru Naval Arsenal, Maizuru, Kyoto	31 March 1911	20 December 1911	21 May 1912	Retired 1 April 1932
Tachibana	橘	Maizuru Naval Arsenal, Maizuru, Kyoto	29 April 1911	27 January 1912	25 June 1912	Retired 1 April 1932

==== Kaba class — 10 ships ====
Name	Kanji	Builder	Laid down	Launched	Completed	Fate
Kaba	樺	Yokosuka Naval Arsenal, Yokosuka	1 December 1914	6 February 1915	5 March 1915	Retired 1 April 1932
Kaede	楓	Maizuru Naval Arsenal, Maizuru, Kyoto	25 October 1914	20 February 1915	25 March 1915	Retired 1 April 1932
Katsura	桂	Kure Naval Arsenal, Kure, Hiroshima	5 November 1914	15 February 1915	26 March 1915	Retired 1 April 1932
Ume	梅	Kawasaki Dockyards, Kobe	10 November 1914	27 February 1915	31 March 1915	Retired 1 April 1932
Sakaki	榊	Sasebo Naval Arsenal, Sasebo, Nagasaki	1 December 1914	4 March 1915	31 March 1915	Retired 1 April 1932
Kusunoki	楠	Kawasaki Dockyards, Kobe	10 November 1914	5 March 1915	31 March 1915	Retired 1 April 1932
Kashiwa	柏	Mitsubishi Shipyards, Nagasaki	3 November 1914	14 February 1915	4 April 1915	Retired 1 April 1932
Matsu	松	Mitsubishi Shipyards, Nagasaki	3 November 1914	5 March 1915	6 April 1915	Retired 1 April 1932
Sugi	杉	Osaka Iron Works, Osaka	24 November 1914	16 February 1915	7 April 1915	Retired 1 April 1932
Kiri	桐	Uraga Dock Company, Uraga, Yokosuka	24 November 1914	28 February 1915	22 April 1915	Retired 1 April 1932

==== Urakaze class — 2 ships ====
Name	Kanji	Builder	Laid down	Launched	Completed	Fate
Urakaze	浦風	Yarrow Shipbuilders, Glasgow, Scotland	1 October 1913	16 February 1915	14 October 1915	Retired 1 April 1936; re-designated "Escort vessel No.18", sunk, 18 July 1945
Kawakaze	江風	Yarrow Shipbuilders, Glasgow, Scotland	1 October 1913	27 September 1915	23 December 1916	Sold to Italy 7 October 1915, renamed Audace; captured by Germany 20 September 1943, renamed TA20; sunk 1 November 1944

==== Momo class — 4 ships ====
Name	Kanji	Builder	Laid down	Launched	Completed	Fate
Momo	桃	Sasebo Naval Arsenal, Sasebo, Nagasaki	28 February 1916	12 October 1916	23 December 1916	Scrapped 1 April 1940
Kashi	樫	Maizuru Naval Arsenal, Maizuru, Kyoto	15 March 1916	1 December 1916	31 March 1917	Transferred to Manchukuo 1 May 1937 as Hai Wei; Returned to IJN 29 June 1942 Kaii, sunk by air attack off Okinawa 10 October 1944
Hinoki	檜	Maizuru Naval Arsenal, Maizuru, Kyoto	5 May 1916	25 December 1916	31 March 1917	Scrapped 1 May 1940
Yanagi	柳	Sasebo Naval Arsenal, Sasebo, Nagasaki	21 October 1916	24 February 1917	5 May 1917	Retired 1 May 1940; training hulk to 1 April 1947

==== Isokaze class — 4 ships ====
Name	Kanji	Builder	Laid down	Launched	Completed	Fate
Isokaze	磯風	Kure Naval Arsenal, Kure, Hiroshima	5 April 1916	5 October 1916	28 February 1917	Retired, 1 April 1935
Hamakaze	浜風	Mitsubishi Shipyards, Nagasaki	1 April 1916	30 October 1916	28 March 1917	Retired, 1 April 1935
Amatsukaze	天津風	Kure Naval Arsenal, Kure, Hiroshima	1 April 1916	5 October 1916	14 April 1917	Retired, 1 April 1935
Tokitsukaze	時津風	Kawasaki Dockyards, Kobe	10 March 1916	27 December 1916	31 May 1917	Wrecked off Miyazaki coast 30 March 1918, repaired 17 February 1920; retired 1 April 1935

==== Acorn class/Kanran class – 2 ships ====
(both ships loaned from the Royal Navy from June 1917 to 1919)

Name	Kanji	Builder	Laid down	Launched	Completed	Fate
Kanran (ex-HMS Nemesis)	橄欖	R. W. Hawthorn Leslie & Company, Hebburn, England	24 November 1911	9 August 1910	March 1911	Returned to Royal Navy, sold for breaking up 26 November 1921
Sendan (ex-HMS Minstrel)	栴檀	John I. Thornycroft & Company, Woolston, Southampton, England	11 March 1910	2 February 1911	May 1911	Returned to Royal Navy, sold for breaking up 1 December 1921

==== Kawakaze class — 2 ships ====
Name	Kanji	Builder	Laid down	Launched	Completed	Fate
Kawakaze	江風	Yokosuka Naval Arsenal, Yokosuka	15 February 1917	10 October 1917	11 November 1918	Retired 1 April 1934
Tanikaze	谷風	Maizuru Naval Arsenal, Maizuru, Kyoto	20 September 1916	20 July 1918	30 January 1919	Retired 1 April 1935

==== Enoki class — 6 ships ====
Name	Kanji	Builder	Laid down	Launched	Completed	Fate
Kuwa	桑	Kure Naval Arsenal, Kure, Hiroshima	5 November 1917	23 February 1918	31 March 1918	Retired, 1 April 1934
Maki	槇	Sasebo Naval Arsenal, Sasebo, Nagasaki	16 October 1917	2 December 1917	7 April 1918	Retired, 1 April 1934
Keyaki	欅	Sasebo Naval Arsenal, Sasebo, Nagasaki	16 October 1917	15 January 1918	20 April 1918	Retired, 1 April 1934
Enoki	榎	Maizuru Naval Arsenal, Maizuru, Kyoto	1 October 1917	5 March 1918	30 April 1918	Converted to minesweeper and renamed W-10 on 1 June 1930; Demilitarized 1 July 1936
Tsubaki	椿	Kure Naval Arsenal, Kure, Hiroshima	5 November 1917	23 February 1918	30 April 1918	Retired 1 April 1935
Nara	楢	Yokosuka Naval Arsenal, Yokosuka	8 November 1917	28 March 1918	30 April 1918	Converted to minesweeper and renamed W-9 on 1 June 1930; Demilitarized 1 April 1936

=== The Inter-War Period ===
From 1919 onwards, a series of destroyers were built regularly in Japan. No further 3rd Class ships were built after 1909, and only two further classes of 2nd Class ships (the Momi and Wakatake classes) were built by 1923, after which all were 1st Class. The ships of the Wakatake, Kamikaze and Mutsuki classes were initially given numbers rather than names, but names were assigned on 1 August 1928. The numbering system continued after 1928, but were not assigned to ships, which were all named.

==== Momi class — 21 ships ====
The total of 21 excludes 7 cancelled. (Warabi lost in August 1927; Momi, Kaya and Nashi scrapped by 1940, leaving 17 which served in the Pacific War)

Name	Kanji	Builder	Laid down	Launched	Completed	Fate
Nashi	梨	Kawasaki Dockyards, Kobe	2 February 1918	26 August 1919	10 December 1919	Decommissioned 1 February 1940 and scrapped
Take	竹	Kawasaki Dockyards, Kobe	2 December 1918	26 August 1919	5 December 1919	Decommissioned 1 February 1940; converted to training ship; scuttled as breakwater at Akita port in 1948
Momi	樅	Yokosuka Naval Arsenal, Yokosuka	23 January 1918	10 June 1919	27 December 1919	Decommissioned 1 April 1932; renamed Disposal Destroyer No.2 (廃駆二号, Haiku 2-Gō); used for trials until 1936
Kaya	榧	Yokosuka Naval Arsenal, Yokosuka	23 December 1918	10 June 1919	28 March 1920	Decommissioned 1 February 1940 and scrapped
Nire	楡	Kure Naval Arsenal, Kure, Hiroshima	5 September 1919	22 December 1919	31 March 1920	Decommissioned, 1 February 1940; converted to training ship, re-converted to auxiliary ship No.1 Tomariura (第一泊浦, Dai-1 Tomariura) 15 December 1944; scrapped 1948
Kuri	栗	Kure Naval Arsenal, Kure, Hiroshima	5 December 1919	19 March 1920	30 April 1920	Mined off Pusan 8 October 1945; struck 25 October 1945
Tsuga	栂	Ishikawajima Shipyards, Tokyo	5 March 1919	17 April 1920	20 June 1920	Sunk off Taiwan 15 January 1945 in air attack; struck 10 March 1945
Kaki	柿	Uraga Dock Company, Uraga, Yokosuka	27 February 1919	20 October 1919	2 August 1920	Decommissioned 1 April 1940; converted to training ship; re-converted to auxiliary ship Ōsu (大須) 23 February 1945; scrapped 1948
Kiku	菊	Kawasaki Dockyards, Kobe	20 January 1920	13 October 1920	10 December 1920	Converted to Patrol Boat No.31 (第三十一号哨戒艇, Dai-31-Gō shōkaitei) 1 April 1940; sunk at Palau 30 March 1944 by air attack; struck 10 May 1944
Aoi	葵	Kawasaki Dockyards, Kobe	1 April 1920	9 November 1920	10 December 1920	Converted to Patrol Boat No.32 (第三十二号哨戒艇, Dai-32-Gō shōkaitei) 1 April 1940; grounded 23 December 1941 at Wake Island; struck 15 January 1942
Hagi	萩	Uraga Dock Company, Uraga, Yokosuka	28 February 1920	29 October 1920	20 April 1921	Converted to Patrol Boat No.33 (第三十三号哨戒艇, Dai-33-Gō shōkaitei) 1 April 1940; grounded 23 December 1941 at Wake Island; struck 15 January 1942
Susuki	薄	Ishikawajima Shipyards, Tokyo	3 May 1920	21 February 1921	25 May 1921	Converted to Patrol Boat No.34 (第三十四号哨戒艇, Dai-34-Gō shōkaitei) 1 April 1940; sunk 6 March 1943 in collision with Yakaze off Kavien; written off 10 January 1945.
Fuji	藤	Fujinagata Shipyards, Osaka	6 December 1919	27 November 1920	31 May 1921	Converted to Patrol Boat No.36 (第三十六号哨戒艇, Dai-36-Gō shōkaitei) 1 April 1940; surrendered to Netherlands in July 1946 at Surabaya; scrapped 10 August 1946
Tsuta	蔦	Kawasaki Dockyards, Kobe	16 October 1920	9 May 1921	30 June 1921	Converted to Patrol Boat No.35 (第三十五号哨戒艇, Dai-35-Gō shōkaitei) 1 April 1940; sunk at Lae by air attack 2 September 1942; struck 10 February 1943
Ashi	葦	Kawasaki Dockyards, Kobe	15 November 1920	3 September 1921	29 October 1921	Decommissioned 1 February 1940; converted to training ship, re-converted to auxiliary ship No.2 Tomariura (第二泊浦, Dai-2 Tomariura) 15 December 1944; modified to Shin'yō suicide motorboatt mothership 1945, scrapped 1947
Warabi	蕨	Fujinagata Shipyards, Osaka	12 October 1920	28 September 1921	19 December 1921	Sunk 24 August 1927 in collision with Jintsu off Cape Miho; struck 15 September 1927
Hishi	菱	Uraga Dock Company, Uraga, Yokosuka	10 November 1920	9 May 1921	23 March 1922	Converted to Patrol Boat No.37 (第三十七号哨戒艇, Dai-37-Gō shōkaitei) 1 April 1940; sunk off Borneo by USS Pope 24 January 1942; struck 10 April 1942
Hasu	蓮	Uraga Dock Company, Uraga, Yokosuka	2 March 1921	8 December 1921	31 July 1922	Retired 12 October 1945; scuttled as breakwater in Fukui in 1946
Tade	蓼	Fujinagata Shipyards, Osaka	20 December 1920	15 March 1921	31 July 1922	Converted to Patrol Boat No.39 (第三十九号哨戒艇, Dai-39-Gō shōkaitei) 1 April 1940; torpedoed off Yonaguni by USS Seawolf (SS-197) 23 April 1943; struck 1 July 1943
Yomogi	蓬	Ishikawajima Shipyards, Tokyo	26 February 1921	14 March 1922	19 August 1922	Converted to Patrol Boat No.38 (第三十八号哨戒艇, Dai-38-Gō shōkaitei) 1 April 1940: torpedoed Bashi Strait by USS Atule 25 November 1944; struck 10 March 1945
Sumire	菫	Ishikawajima Shipyards, Tokyo	24 November 1920	14 December 1921	31 March 1923	Decommissioned 1 February 1940; converted to training ship, re-converted to auxiliary ship Mitaka (三高) 23 February 1945; scrapped 1948

==== Minekaze class — 15 ships ====
Name	Kanji	Builder	Laid down	Launched	Completed	Fate
Sawakaze	澤風	Mitsubishi Shipyards, Nagasaki	7 Jan 1918	7 Jan 1919	6 Mar 1920	Retired 15 Sep 1945; scuttled 1948
Minekaze	峯風	Maizuru Naval Arsenal, Maizuru, Kyoto	20 Apr 1918	8 Feb 1919	29 May 1920	Torpedoed E of Taiwan 23.12°N 121.30°E 10 Feb 1944; struck 31 Mar 1944
Yakaze	矢風	Mitsubishi Shipyards, Nagasaki	15 Aug 1918	10 Apr 1920	19 Jul 1920	Torpedo School vessel 20 Jul 1942; lost in explosion 20 Jul 1945; struck 15 Sep 1945
Okikaze	沖風	Maizuru Naval Arsenal, Maizuru, Kyoto	22 Feb 1919	3 Oct 1919	17 Aug 1920	Torpedoed S of Yokosuka 35.02°N 140.12°E 10 Jan 1943; struck 1 Mar 1943
Hakaze	羽風	Mitsubishi Shipyards, Nagasaki	11 Nov 1918	21 Jun 1920	16 Sep 1920	Torpedoed SW of Kavien 02.47°S 150.38°E 23 Jan 1943; struck 1 Mar 1943
Shimakaze	島風	Maizuru Naval Arsenal, Maizuru, Kyoto	5 Sep 1919	31 Mar 1920	15 Nov 1920	Renamed Patrol Boat PB-1 on 1 Apr 1940; torpedoed WSW of Kavieng 02.51°S 149.43°E 13 Jan 1943; struck 10 Feb 1943
Shiokaze	汐風	Maizuru Naval Arsenal, Maizuru, Kyoto	15 May 1920	22 Oct 1920	29 Jul 1921	Retired 5 Oct 1945; scuttled 1948
Yūkaze	夕風	Mitsubishi Shipyards, Nagasaki	14 Dec 1920	28 Apr 1921	24 Aug 1921	Retired 5 Oct 1945; prize of war to UK 14 Aug 1947; broken up
Akikaze	秋風	Mitsubishi Shipyards, Nagasaki	7 Jun 1920	14 Dec 1920	16 Sep 1921	Torpedoed W of Luzon 16.48°N 117.17°E 3 Nov 1944; struck 10 Jan 1945
Nadakaze	灘風	Maizuru Naval Arsenal, Maizuru, Kyoto	9 Jan 1920	26 Jun 1920	30 Sep 1921	Renamed Patrol Boat PB-2 on 1 Apr 1940; torpedoed Lombok Strait 07.06°S 115.42°E 25 Jul 1945; struck 30 Sep 1945
Tachikaze	太刀風	Maizuru Naval Arsenal, Maizuru, Kyoto	18 Aug 1920	31 Mar 1921	5 Dec 1921	Air attack at Truk 07.04°N 151.55°E 17 Feb 1944; struck 13 Mar 1944
Hokaze	帆風	Maizuru Naval Arsenal, Maizuru, Kyoto	30 Nov 1920	12 Jul 1921	22 Dec 1921	Torpedoed N of Celebes 03.24°N 125.28°E 6 Jul 1944; struck 10 Oct 1944
Nokaze	野風	Maizuru Naval Arsenal, Maizuru, Kyoto	16 Apr 1921	1 Oct 1921	31 Mar 1922	Torpedoed off Cam Ranh Bay 12.48°N 109.38°E 20 Feb 1945; struck 10 Apr 1945
Numakaze	沼風	Maizuru Naval Arsenal, Maizuru, Kyoto	10 Aug 1921	22 May 1922	24 Jul 1922	Torpedoed SE of Okinawa 26.29°N 128.26°E 19 Dec 1943; struck 5 Feb 1944
Namikaze	波風	Maizuru Naval Arsenal, Maizuru, Kyoto	7 Nov 1921	24 Jun 1922	11 Nov 1922	Retired 5 Oct 1945; Prize of war to China 3 Oct 1947; broken up 1960

==== Wakatake class — 8 ships ====
The total of 8 excludes 5 cancelled in 1922.

Name	Kanji	Number	Builder	Laid down	Launched	Completed	Fate
Wakatake	若竹	Dai-2	Kawasaki Dockyards, Kobe	13 December 1921	24 July 1922	30 September 1922	Sunk in air attack off Palau during Operation Desecrate One 07.50°N 134.20°E 30 March 1944; struck 10 May 1944
Kuretake	呉竹	Dai-4	Maizuru Naval Arsenal, Maizuru, Kyoto	15 March 1922	21 October 1922	21 December 1922	Sunk by USS Razorback at Bashi Channel 21°N 121.24°E 30 December 1944; struck 10 February 1945
Sanae	早苗	Dai-6	Uraga Dock Company, Uraga, Yokosuka	5 April 1922	15 February 1923	5 November 1923	Torpedoed by USS Bluefish in Celebes Sea 04.52°N 122.07°E 13 November 1943; struck 5 January 1944
Sawarabi	早蕨	Dai-8	Uraga Dock Company, Uraga, Yokosuka	20 November 1922	1 September 1923	24 July 1924	Capsized in storm off Keelung, Taiwan 27.17°N 122.12°E 5 December 1932; struck 1 April 1933
Asagao	朝顔	Dai-10	Ishikawajima Shipyards, Tokyo	14 March 1922	4 November 1922	10 May 1923	Sunk by naval mine at Kanmon Straits 22 August 1945; raised and broken up 1948
Yūgao	夕顔	Dai-12	Ishikawajima Shipyards, Tokyo	15 May 1922	14 April 1923	31 May 1924	Converted to Patrol Boat No. 46 (第四六号哨戒艇, Dai-46-Gō shōkaitei), 1 February 1940; sunk by USS Greenling at Irōzaki 10 November 1944
Fuyō	芙蓉	Dai-16	Fujinagata Shipyards, Osaka	16 February 1922	23 September 1922	16 March 1923	Torpedoed by USS Puffer off Manila Bay 14.44°N 119.55°E 20 December 1943; struck 5 February 1944
Karukaya	刈萱	Dai-18	Fujinagata Shipyards, Osaka	16 May 1922	19 March 1923	20 August 1923	Torpedoed by USS Cod west of Luzon 15.38°N 119.25°E 10 May 1944; struck 10 July 1944

==== Kamikaze class — 9 ships ====
Name	Kanji	Number	Builder	Laid down	Launched	Completed	Fate
Kamikaze	神風	Dai-1	Mitsubishi Shipyards, Nagasaki	15 December 1921	25 September 1922	19 December 1922	renamed Kamikaze on 1 August 1928; demilitarized repatriation ship 1 December 1945; grounded Omaezaki 7 June 1946; stricken 26 June 1946
Asakaze	朝風	Dai-3	Mitsubishi Shipyards, Nagasaki	16 February 1922	8 December 1922	16 June 1923	renamed Asakaze on 1 August 1928; Torpedoed west of Luzon [16.06N, 119.44E] 23 August 1944; stricken 10 October 1944
Harukaze	春風	Dai-5	Maizuru Naval Arsenal, Maizuru, Kyoto	16 May 1922	18 December 1922	31 May 1923	renamed Harukaze on 1 August 1928; surrendered to USN 10 November 1945; scrapped 1947
Matsukaze	松風	Dai-7	Maizuru Naval Arsenal, Maizuru, Kyoto	2 December 1922	30 October 1923	5 April 1924	renamed Matsukaze on 1 August 1928; Torpedoed NW of Chichijima [26.59N, 143.13E] 9 June 1944; stricken 10 August 1944
Hatakaze	旗風	Dai-9	Maizuru Naval Arsenal, Maizuru, Kyoto	3 July 1923	15 March 1924	30 August 1924	renamed Hatakaze on 1 August 1928; sunk by air attack off Takao [22.37N, 120.15E] 15 January 1945; stricken 10 March 1945
Oite	追風	Dai-11	Uraga Dock Company, Uraga, Yokosuka	16 March 1923	27 November 1924	30 October 1925	renamed Oite on 1 August 1928; sunk by air attack at Truk [07.40N, 151.45E] 18 February 1944; stricken 11 March 1944
Hayate	疾風	Dai-13	Ishikawajima Shipyards, Tokyo	11 November 1922	24 March 1925	21 November 1925	renamed Hayate on 1 August 1928; combat loss in Battle of Wake Island [19.16N, 166.37E] 11 December 1941; stricken 10 January 1942
Asanagi	朝凪	Dai-15	Fujinagata Shipyards, Osaka	5 March 1923	21 April 1924	29 December 1925	renamed Asanagi on 1 August 1928; torpedoed W of Ogasawara [28.20N, 138.57E] 22 May 1944; stricken 10 July 1944
Yūnagi	夕凪	Dai-17	Sasebo Naval Arsenal, Sasebo, Nagasaki	17 September 1923	23 April 1924	24 May 1925	renamed Yūnagi on 1 August 1928; torpedoed NW of Luzon [18.46N, 120.46E] 25 August 1944; struck 10 October 1944

==== Mutsuki class — 12 ships ====
Name	Kanji	Number	Builder	Laid down	Launched	Completed	Fate
Satsuki	皐月	Dai-27	Fujinagata Shipyards, Osaka	1 Dec 1923	25 Mar 1925	15 Nov 1925	sunk in air attack at Manila Bay 15.35°N 120.55°E 21 Sep 1944; struck 10 Nov 1944
Kisaragi	如月	Dai-21	Maizuru Naval Arsenal, Maizuru, Kyoto	3 Jun 1924	5 Jun 1925	21 Dec 1925	combat loss off Wake Island 18.55°N 166.17°E 11 Dec 1941; struck 15 Jan 1942
Mutsuki	睦月	Dai-19	Sasebo Naval Arsenal, Sasebo, Nagasaki	21 May 1924	23 Jul 1925	25 Mar 1926	sunk in air attack in Solomon Islands 07.47°S 160.13°E 25 Aug 1942; struck 1 Oct 1942
Fumizuki	文月	Dai-29	Fujinagata Shipyards, Osaka	20 Oct 1924	16 Feb 1926	3 Jul 1926	sunk in air attack at Truk 07.24°N 151.44°E 18 Feb 1944; struck 31 Mar 1944
Yayoi	弥生	Dai-23	Uraga Dock Company, Uraga, Yokosuka	11 Jan 1924	11 Jul 1925	28 Aug 1926	sunk in air attack in Solomon Islands 08.45°S 151.25°E 11 Sep 1942; struck 20 Oct 1942
Uzuki	卯月	Dai-25	Ishikawajima Shipyards, Tokyo	11 Jan 1924	15 Oct 1925	14 Sep 1926	Sunk Ormoc Bay 11.03°N 124.23°E 12 Dec 1944; struck 10 Jan 1945
Kikuzuki	菊月	Dai-31	Maizuru Naval Arsenal, Maizuru, Kyoto	15 Jun 1925	15 May 1926	20 Nov 1926	sunk in air attack at Tulagi 09.07°S 160.12°E 4 May 1942; struck 25 May 1942; Later salvaged by USS Menominee (AT-73), 6 Oct 1943
Minazuki	水無月	Dai-28	Uraga Dock Company, Uraga, Yokosuka	24 Mar 1925	25 May 1926	22 Mar 1927	Torpedoed in Celebes Sea 04.05°N 119.30°E 6 Jun 1944; struck 10 Aug 1944
Nagatsuki	長月	Dai-30	Ishikawajima Shipyards, Tokyo	16 Apr 1925	6 Oct 1926	30 Apr 1927	combat loss in central Solomons 08.02°S 157.12°E 6 Jul 1943; struck 1 Nov 1943
Mikazuki	三日月	Dai-32	Sasebo Naval Arsenal, Sasebo, Nagasaki	21 Aug 1925	12 Jul 1926	5 May 1927	sunk in air attack at Cape Gloucester 05.27°S 148.25°E 29 Jul 1943; struck 15 Oct 1943
Yūzuki	夕月	Dai-34	Fujinagata Shipyards, Kyoto	27 Nov 1926	4 Mar 1927	25 Jul 1927	sunk in air attack at Cebu 11.20°N 124.10°E 12 Dec 1944; struck 10 Jan 1945
Mochizuki	望月	Dai-33	Uraga Dock Company, Uraga, Yokosuka	23 Mar 1926	28 Apr 1927	31 Oct 1927	sunk in air attack in central Solomons 05.42°S 151.40°E 24 Oct 1943; struck 5 Jan 1944

==== Fubuki class (Special Type I) — 10 ships ====
Name	Kanji	Number	Builder	Laid down	Launched	Completed	Fate
Fubuki	吹雪	Dai-35	Maizuru Naval Arsenal, Maizuru, Kyoto	19 Jun 1926	15 Nov 1927	10 Aug 1928	Sunk in surface action off Guadalcanal 09.06°S 159.38°E 11 Oct 1942; struck 15 Nov 1942
Shirayuki	白雪	Dai-36	Yokohama Dockyard, Yokohama	19 Mar 1927	20 Mar 1928	18 Dec 1928	air attack off Dampir Strait 07.15°S 148.30°E 3 Mar 1943; struck 1 Apr 1943
Hatsuyuki	初雪	Dai-37	Maizuru Naval Arsenal, Maizuru, Kyoto	12 Apr 1927	29 Sep 1928	30 Mar 1929	Air attack off Buin 06.50°S 155.47°E 17 Jul 1943; struck 15 Oct 1943
Murakumo	叢雲	Dai-39	Fujinagata Shipyards, Osaka	25 Apr 1927	27 Sep 1928	10 May 1929	air attack off Guadalcanal 08.40°S 159.20°E 12 Oct 1942; struck 15 Nov 1942
Miyuki	深雪	Dai-38	Uraga Dock Company, Uraga, Yokosuka	30 Apr 1927	26 Jun 1928	29 Jun 1929	Collision with Inazuma, S Cheju Island 33°N 125.30°E 29 Jun 1934; struck 15 Aug 1934
Isonami	磯波	Dai-43	Uraga Dock Company, Uraga, Yokosuka	18 Oct 1926	24 Nov 1927	30 Jun 1928	Torpedoed off SW Celebes 05.26°S 123.04°E 9 Apr 1943; struck 1 Aug 1943
Shinonome	東雲	Dai-40	Sasebo Naval Arsenal, Sasebo, Nagasaki	12 Aug 1926	26 Nov 1927	25 Jul 1928	Air attack near Miri 04.24°N 114°E 17 Dec 1941; struck 15 Jan 1942
Usugumo	薄雲	Dai-41	Ishikawajima Shipyards, Tokyo	21 Oct 1926	26 Dec 1927	26 Jul 1928	Torpedoed off Etorofu 47.43°N 147.55°E 7 Jul 1944; struck 10 Sep 1944
Shirakumo	白雲	Dai-42	Fujinagata Shipyards, Osaka	27 Oct 1926	27 Dec 1927	28 Jul 1928	Torpedoed off Cape Erimo 42.25°N 144.55°E 16 Mar 1944; struck 31 Mar 1944
Uranami	浦波	Dai-44	Sasebo Naval Arsenal, Sasebo, Nagasaki	28 Apr 1927	29 Nov 1928	30 Jun 1929	Air attack W of Panay 11.50°N 123°E 26 Oct 1944; struck 10 Dec 1944

==== Ayanami class (Special Type II) — 10 ships ====
Name	Kanji	Number	Builder	Laid down	Launched	Completed	Fate
Ayanami	綾波	Dai-45	Fujinagata Shipyards, Osaka	20 Jan 1928	5 Oct 1929	30 Apr 1930	Scuttled off Guadalcanal by Uranami 09.10°S 159.52°E 15 Nov 1942; struck 15 Dec 1942
Shikinami	敷波	Dai-46	Maizuru Naval Arsenal, Maizuru, Kyoto	6 Jul 1928	22 Jun 1929	24 Dec 1929	Torpedoed S of Hainan 18.16°N 114.40°E 12 Sep 1944; struck 10 Oct 1944
Asagiri	朝霧	Dai-47	Sasebo Naval Arsenal, Sasebo, Nagasaki	12 Dec 1928	18 Nov 1929	30 Jun 1930	Air attack off Guadalcanal 08°S 160.10°E 28 Aug 1942; struck 1 Oct 1942
Yūgiri	夕霧	Dai-48	Maizuru Naval Arsenal, Maizuru, Kyoto	1 Apr 1929	12 May 1930	3 Dec 1930	Sunk in action central Solomons 04.44°S 154°E 25 Nov 1943; struck 15 Dec 1943
Amagiri	天霧	Dai-49	Ishikawajima Shipyards, Tokyo	28 Nov 1928	27 Feb 1930	10 Nov 1930	Mined, S of Makassar Strait 02.10°S 116.45°E 23 Apr 1944; struck 10 Jun 1944
Sagiri	狭霧	Dai-50	Uraga Dock Company, Uraga, Yokosuka	28 Mar 1929	23 Dec 1929	30 Jan 1931	Torpedoed off Kuching 01.34°N 110.21°E 24 Dec 1941; struck 15 Jan 1942
Oboro	朧	Dai-51	Sasebo Naval Arsenal, Sasebo, Nagasaki	29 Nov 1929	8 Nov 1930	31 Oct 1931	Air attack off Kiska Island 52.17°N 178.08°E 16 Oct 1942; struck 15 Nov 1942
Akebono	曙	Dai-52	Sasebo Naval Arsenal, Sasebo, Nagasaki	25 Oct 1929	7 Nov 1930	31 Jul 1931	Air attack Manila Bay 14.35°N 120.50°E 13 Nov 1944; struck 10 Jan 1945
Sazanami	漣	Dai-53	Maizuru Naval Arsenal, Maizuru, Kyoto	21 Feb 1930	6 Jun 1931	19 May 1932	Torpedoed E of Palau 05.15°N 141.15°E 14 Jan 1944; struck 10 Mar 1944
Ushio	潮	Dai-54	Uraga Dock Company, Uraga, Yokosuka	24 Dec 1929	17 Nov 1930	14 Nov 1931	Surrendered to Allies 15 Sep 1945; scrapped 1948

==== Akatsuki class (Special Type III) — 4 ships ====
Name	Kanji	Number	Builder	Laid down	Launched	Completed	Fate
Akatsuki	暁	Dai-55	Sasebo Naval Arsenal, Sasebo, Nagasaki	17 Feb 1930	7 May 1932	30 Nov 1932	Sunk in action off Guadalcanal 09.17°S 159.56°E 13 Nov 1942; struck 15 Dec 1942
Hibiki	響	Dai-56	Maizuru Naval Arsenal, Maizuru, Kyoto	21 Feb 1930	16 Jun 1932	31 Mar 1933	surrendered 5 Oct 1945; prize of war to USSR and renamed Verniy 5 Jul 1947; sunk as target around 1970s
Ikazuchi	雷	Dai-57	Uraga Dock Company, Uraga, Yokosuka	7 Mar 1930	22 Oct 1931	15 Aug 1932	torpedoed W of Guam 10.13°N 143.51°E 13 Apr 1944; struck 10 Jun 1944
Inazuma	電	Dai-58	Fujinagata Shipyards, Osaka	7 Mar 1930	25 Feb 1932	15 Nov 1932	Torpedoed W of Celebes 05.08°N 119.38°E 14 May 1944; struck 10 Jun 1944

==== Hatsuharu class — 6 ships ====
Name	Kanji	Number	Builder	Laid down	Launched	Completed	Fate
Hatsuharu	初春	Dai-59	Sasebo Naval Arsenal, Sasebo, Nagasaki	14 May 1931	27 February 1933	30 September 1933	Air attack in Manila Bay 13 November 1944
Nenohi	子日	Dai-60	Uraga Dock Company, Uraga, Yokosuka	15 December 1931	22 December 1932	30 September 1933	Torpedoed near Agattu Island 4 July 1942
Hatsushimo	初霜	Dai-62	Uraga Dock Company, Uraga, Yokosuka	31 January 1933	4 November 1933	27 September 1934	Mined and sunk 30 July 1945
Wakaba	若葉	Dai-61	Sasebo Naval Arsenal, Sasebo, Nagasaki	12 December 1931	18 March 1934	31 October 1934	Air attack off Panay 24 October 1944
Ariake	有明	Dai-63	Kawasaki Dockyards, Kobe	14 January 1933	23 September 1934	25 March 1935	Air attack near Cape Gloucester 28 July 1943
Yūgure	夕暮	Dai-64	Maizuru Naval Arsenal, Maizuru, Kyoto	9 April 1933	6 May 1934	30 March 1935	Air attack off Kolombangara 20 July 1943

==== Chidori class — 4 ships ====
These four vessels were nominally "torpedo boats". Built under the 1st Naval Armaments Supplement Programme of 1931.

Name	Kanji	Builder	Laid down	Launched	Completed	Fate
Chidori	千鳥	Maizuru Naval Arsenal, Maizuru, Kyoto	13 October 1931	1 April 1933	20 November 1933	Sunk 21 December 1944 by USS Tilefish (SS-307) west of Omaezaki 34°33′N 138°02′E
Manazuru	真鶴	Fujinagata Shipyards, Osaka	22 December 1931	11 July 1933	31 January 1934	Sunk 1 March 1945 by air raid at Naha 26°17′N 127°35′E
Tomozuru	友鶴	Maizuru Naval Arsenal, Maizuru, Kyoto	11 November 1932	1 October 1933	24 February 1934	Sunk 24 March 1945 by air raid at west of Amami Ōshima 29°15′N 125°13′E
Hatsukari	初雁	Fujinagata Shipyards, Osaka	6 April 1933	19 December 1933	15 July 1934	Captured by United Kingdom at the end of war; Decommissioned 3 May 1947, scrapped 1948

=== The Second Sino-Japanese War and World War II ===
==== Ōtori class — 8 ships ====
These eight vessels were nominally "torpedo boats". The total of 8 excludes another 8 cancelled units.

Name	Kanji	Builder	Laid down	Launched	Completed	Fate
Ōtori	鴻	Maizuru Naval Arsenal, Maizuru, Kyoto	8 Nov 1934	25 Apr 1935	10 Oct 1936	Sunk by aircraft of Task Force 58 NW of Saipan 12 Jun 1944
Hayabusa	隼	Yokohama Dockyard, Yokohama	19 Dec 1934	28 Oct 1935	7 Dec 1936	Sunk by aircraft in Sibuyan Sea 24 Sep 1944
Hiyodori	鵯	Ishikawajima Shipyards, Tokyo	26 Nov 1934	25 Oct 1935	20 Dec 1936	Sunk by USS Gunnel in South China Sea 17 Nov 1944
Kasasagi	鵲	Ōsaka Iron Works	4 Mar 1935	18 Oct 1935	15 Jan 1937	Sunk by USS Bluefish in Flores Sea, 26 Sep 1943
Kiji	雉	Mitsui Engineering & Shipbuilding, Tamano, Okayama	24 Oct 1935	26 Jan 1937	31 Jul 1937	Surrendered to Soviet Union at Nakhodka on 3 Oct 1947; Renamed Vnimatel'nyy; Decommissioned 31 Oct 1957
Sagi	鷺	Harima Shipyards, Kudamatsu, Yamaguchi	20 May 1936	30 Jan 1937	31 Jul 1937	Sunk by USS Gunnel W of Luzon 8 Nov 1944
Hato	鳩	Ishikawajima Shipyards, Tokyo	28 May 1936	25 Jan 1937	7 Aug 1937	Sunk by aircraft at Hong Kong 16 Oct 1944
Kari	雁	Yokohama Dockyard, Yokohama	11 May 1936	20 Jan 1937	20 Sep 1937	Sunk by USS Baya in Java Sea 16 July 1945

==== Shiratsuyu class — 10 ships ====
Name	Kanji	Number	Builder	Laid down	Launched	Completed	Fate
Shiratsuyu	白露	Dai-65	Sasebo Naval Arsenal, Sasebo, Nagasaki	14 November 1933	5 April 1935	20 August 1936	Collision 15 June 1944 at 09°09′N 126°51′E
Shigure	時雨	Dai-66	Uraga Dock Company, Uraga, Yokosuka	9 December 1933	18 May 1935	7 September 1936	Torpedoed in Gulf of Siam 24 January 1945 at 06°00′N 103°48′E
Murasame	村雨	Dai-67	Fujinagata Shipyards, Osaka	1 February 1934	20 June 1935	7 January 1937	Sunk in action 6 March 1943 at 08°03′S 157°13′E
Yūdachi	夕立	Dai-68	Sasebo Naval Arsenal, Sasebo, Nagasaki	16 October 1934	21 June 1936	7 January 1937	Sunk in action 13 November 1942 at 09°14′S 159°52′E
Samidare	五月雨	Dai-70	Uraga Dock Company, Uraga, Yokosuka	19 December 1934	6 July 1935	29 January 1937	Torpedoed near Palau 25 August 1944 at 08°10′N 134°38′E
Kawakaze	江風	Dai-73	Fujinagata Shipyards, Osaka	25 April 1935	1 November 1936	30 April 1937	Sunk in action 6 August 1943 at 07°50′S 156°54′E
Umikaze	海風	Dai-71	Maizuru Naval Arsenal, Maizuru, Kyoto	4 May 1935	27 November 1936	31 May 1937	Torpedoed at Truk Atoll 1 February 1944 at 07°10′N 151°43′E
Yamakaze	山風	Dai-72	Uraga Dock Company, Uraga, Yokosuka	25 May 1935	21 February 1936	30 June 1937	Torpedoed SE of Yokosuka, 25 June 1942 at 34°34′N 140°26′E
Harusame	春雨	Dai-69	Maizuru Naval Arsenal, Maizuru, Kyoto	3 February 1935	21 September 1935	26 August 1937	Air attack NW of Manokwari, New Guinea 8 June 1944 at 00°05′S 132°45′E
Suzukaze	涼風	Dai-74	Uraga Dock Company, Uraga, Yokosuka	9 July 1935	11 March 1937	31 August 1937	Torpedoed NNW of Pohnpei 25 January 1944 at 08°51′N 157°10′E

==== Asashio class — 10 ships ====
Name	Kanji	Number	Builder	Laid down	Launched	Completed	Fate
Asashio	朝潮	Dai-75	Sasebo Naval Arsenal, Sasebo, Nagasaki	7 September 1935	16 December 1936	31 August 1937	Air strike in the Battle of the Bismarck Sea 4 March 1943 at 07°15′S 148°15′E
Ōshio	大潮	Dai-76	Maizuru Naval Arsenal, Maizuru, Kyoto	5 August 1936	19 April 1937	31 October 1937	Torpedoed 20 February 1943 (Solomon Islands campaign) at 00°50′S 146°06′E
Michishio	満潮	Dai-77	Fujinagata Shipyards, Osaka	5 November 1935	15 March 1937	31 October 1937	Surface action in the Battle of Surigao Strait 25 October 1944 at 10°25′N 125°23′E
Arashio	荒潮	Dai-78	Kawasaki Dockyards, Kobe	1 October 1935	26 May 1937	30 December 1937	Air attack in the Battle of the Bismarck Sea 4 March 1943 at 07°15′S 148°30′E
Yamagumo	山雲	Dai-79	Fujinagata Shipyards, Osaka	4 November 1936	24 July 1937	15 January 1938	Surface action in the Battle of Surigao Strait 25 October 1944 at 10°25′N 125°23′E
Natsugumo	夏雲	Dai-80	Sasebo Naval Arsenal, Sasebo, Nagasaki	1 July 1936	26 May 1937	10 February 1938	Air attack in the Battle of Cape Esperance 12 October 1942 at 08°40′S 159°20′E
Asagumo	朝雲	Dai-81	Kawasaki Dockyards, Kobe	23 December 1936	5 November 1937	31 March 1938	Surface action in the Battle of Surigao Strait 25 October 1944 at 10°04′N 125°21′E
Minegumo	峯雲	Dai-82	Fujinagata Shipyards	22 March 1937	4 November 1937	30 April 1938	Surface action in the Battle of Blackett Strait 5 March 1943 at 08°01′S 157°14′E
Arare	霰	Dai-83	Maizuru Naval Arsenal, Maizuru, Kyoto	5 March 1937	16 November 1937	15 April 1939	Torpedoed 5 July 1942 at 52°0′N 177°40′E
Kasumi	霞	Dai-84	Uraga Dock Company, Uraga, Yokosuka	1 December 1936	18 November 1937	24 June 1939	Operation Ten-Go 7 April 1945 at 31°N 128°E

==== Kagerō class (Type A) — 19 ships ====
Name	Kanji	Number	Builder	Laid down	Launched	Completed	Fate
Kagerō	陽炎	Dai-85	Maizuru Naval Arsenal, Maizuru, Kyoto	3 September 1937	27 September 1938	6 November 1939	Air attack SW of Rendova 8 May 1943 at 08°08′S 156°55′E
Shiranui	不知火	Dai-86	Uraga Dock Company, Uraga, Yokosuka	30 August 1937	28 June 1938	20 December 1939	Air attack N of Iloilo, Panay 27 October 1944 at 12°0′N 122°30′E
Yukikaze	雪風	Dai-92	Sasebo Naval Arsenal, Sasebo, Nagasaki	2 August 1938	24 March 1939	20 January 1940	Surrendered to Republic of China on 6 July 1947 at Shanghai, renamed DD-12 Tan Yang (丹陽); scrapped 1970
Kuroshio	黒潮	Dai-87	Fujinagata Shipyards, Osaka	31 August 1937	25 October 1938	27 January 1940	Mined leaving Vila, Kolombangara 8 May 1943 at 08°08′S 156°55′E
Hatsukaze	初風	Dai-91	Kawasaki Dockyards, Kobe	3 December 1937	24 January 1939	15 February 1940	Sunk in Battle of Empress Augusta Bay 2 November 1943 at 06°01′S 153°58′E
Oyashio	親潮	Dai-88	Maizuru Naval Arsenal, Maizuru, Kyoto	29 March 1938	29 November 1938	20 August 1940	Mined, air attack leaving Vila, Kolombangara 8 May 1943 at 08°08′S 156°55′E
Hayashio	早潮	Dai-89	Uraga Dock Company, Uraga, Yokosuka	30 June 1938	19 April 1939	31 August 1940	Scuttled after air attack, Guna Bay 24 November 1942 at 07°0′S 147°30′E
Natsushio	夏潮	Dai-90	Fujinagata Shipyards, Osaka	9 December 1937	23 February 1939	31 August 1940	Torpedoed S of Makassar 9 February 1942 at 05°10′S 119°24′E
Amatsukaze	天津風	Dai-93	Maizuru Naval Arsenal, Maizuru, Kyoto	14 February 1939	19 October 1939	26 October 1940	Air attack E of Xiamen 6 April 1945 at 24°30′N 118°10′E
Isokaze	磯風	Dai-96	Sasebo Naval Arsenal, Sasebo, Nagasaki	25 November 1938	19 June 1939	30 November 1940	Scuttled SW of Nagasaki following air attack 7 April 1945 at 30.46°N 128.92°E
Tokitsukaze	時津風	Dai-94	Uraga Dock Company, Uraga, Yokosuka	20 February 1939	10 November 1939	15 December 1940	Air attack SE of Finschhafen 3 March 1943 at 07°16′S 148°15′E
Urakaze	浦風	Dai-95	Fujinagata Shipyards, Osaka	11 April 1939	19 April 1940	15 December 1940	Torpedoed NNW of Keelung, Taiwan 21 November 1944 at 26°09′N 121°23′E
Arashi	嵐	Dai-100	Maizuru Naval Arsenal, Maizuru, Kyoto	4 May 1939	22 April 1940	27 January 1941	Sunk in Battle of Vella Gulf 6 August 1943 at 07°50′S 156°55′E
Hagikaze	萩風	Dai-101	Uraga Dock Company, Uraga, Yokosuka	23 May 1939	18 June 1940	31 March 1941	Sunk in Battle of Vella Gulf 6 August 1943 at 07°50′S 156°55′E
Tanikaze	谷風	Dai-98	Fujinagata Shipyards, Osaka	18 October 1939	1 November 1940	25 April 1941	Torpedoed in Sibutu Passage 9 June 1944 at 05°42′N 120°41′E
Nowaki	野分	Dai-99	Maizuru Naval Arsenal, Maizuru, Kyoto	8 November 1939	17 September 1940	28 April 1941	Sunk in the aftermath of the Battle off Samar 26 October 1944 at 13°0′N 124°54′E
Hamakaze	浜風	Dai-97	Uraga Dock Company, Uraga, Yokosuka	20 November 1939	25 November 1940	30 June 1941	Air attack SW of Nagasaki 7 April 1945 at 30°47′N 128°08′E
Maikaze	舞風	Dai-102	Fujinagata Shipyards, Osaka	22 April 1940	13 March 1941	15 July 1941	Sunk in surface action during Operation Hailstone at Truk 17 February 1944 at 07°45′N 151°20′E
Akigumo	秋雲	Dai-103	Uraga Dock Company, Uraga, Yokosuka	2 July 1940	11 April 1941	27 September 1941	Torpedoed SE of Zamboanga, Philippines 11 April 1944 at 06°43′N 122°23′E

==== Akizuki class (Type B) — 12 ships ====
The total of 12 excludes 1 uncompleted (Michitsuki) and 3 cancelled; 21 intended further ships were never ordered.

Name	Kanji	Number	Builder	Laid down	Launched	Completed	Fate
Akizuki	秋月	Dai-104	Maizuru Naval Arsenal, Maizuru, Kyoto	30 June 1940	2 July 1941	11 June 1942	Sunk during the Battle off Cape Engaño 25 October 1944. Removed from navy list on 10 December 1944.
Teruzuki	照月	Dai-105	Mitsubishi Shipyards, Nagasaki	13 November 1940	21 November 1941	31 August 1942	Heavily damaged by USS PT-37 and PT-40 off Savo Island 11 December 1942. Scuttled 12 December 1942. Removed from navy list 20 January 1943.
Suzutsuki	涼月	Dai-106	Mitsubishi Shipyards, Nagasaki	15 March 1941	3 March 1942	29 December 1942	Survived war at Sasebo. Decommissioned 20 November 1945. Converted to breakwater at Kitakyūshū in July 1948.
Hatsuzuki	初月	Dai-107	Maizuru Naval Arsenal, Maizuru, Kyoto	25 July 1941	3 April 1942	29 December 1942	Sunk during the Battle off Cape Engaño 25 October 1944. Removed from navy list 10 December 1944.
Niizuki	新月	Dai-108	Mitsubishi Shipyards, Nagasaki	8 December 1941	29 June 1942	31 March 1943	Sunk during the Battle of Kula Gulf 6 July 1943. Removed from navy list 10 September 1943.
Wakatsuki	若月	Dai-109	Mitsubishi Shipyards, Nagasaki	9 March 1942	24 November 1942	31 May 1943	Sunk during the Battle of Ormoc Bay 11 November 1944. Removed from navy list 10 January 1945.
Shimotsuki	霜月		Mitsubishi Shipyards, Nagasaki	6 July 1942	7 April 1943	31 March 1944	Sunk by USS Cavalla off Anambas Islands 25 November 1944. Removed from navy list 10 January 1945.
Fuyutsuki	冬月		Maizuru Naval Arsenal, Maizuru, Kyoto	8 May 1943	20 January 1944	25 May 1944	Survived war at Kitakyūshū. Decommissioned 20 November 1945. Converted to breakwater at Kitakyūshū in July 1948.
Hanazuki	花月		Maizuru Naval Arsenal, Maizuru, Kyoto	10 February 1944	10 October 1944	26 December 1944	Survived war at western Inland Sea. Decommissioned 5 October 1945. Surrendered to United States 29 August 1947 and renamed DD-934. Sunk as target off the Gotō Islands 3 February 1948.
Harutsuki	春月		Sasebo Naval Arsenal, Sasebo, Nagasaki	23 December 1943	3 August 1944	28 December 1944	Survived war at Kure. Decommissioned 5 October 1945. Surrendered to Soviet Union 28 August 1947 and renamed Vnezapniy
Yoizuki	宵月		Uraga Dock Company, Uraga, Yokosuka	25 August 1943	25 September 1944	31 January 1945	Survived war at Nōmi. Decommissioned 5 October 1945. Surrendered to Republic of China 29 August 1947 and renamed Fen Yang. Scrapped in 1963.
Natsuzuki	夏月		Sasebo Naval Arsenal, Sasebo, Nagasaki	1 May 1944	2 December 1944	8 April 1945	Survived war at Kitakyūshū. Decommissioned 5 October 1945. Surrendered to United Kingdom 25 August 1947. Sold and scrapped at Uraga in September 1947-March 1948.

==== Yūgumo class (Type A) — 19 ships ====
The total of 19 (11 ordered under 1939 Programme, 16 under 1941 Programme - the latter referred to by Japan as Hamanami Group) excludes 8 cancelled.

Name	Kanji	Number	Builder	Laid down	Launched	Completed	Fate
Yūgumo	夕雲	Dai-110	Maizuru Naval Arsenal, Maizuru, Kyoto	12 June 1940	16 March 1941	5 December 1941	Sunk during Battle of Vella Lavella 6 October 1943
Makigumo	巻雲	Dai-111	Fujinagata Shipyards, Osaka	13 December 1940	5 November 1941	14 March 1942	Sunk after surface action 1 February 1943
Kazagumo	風雲	Dai-112	Uraga Dock Company, Uraga, Yokosuka	23 December 1940	26 September 1941	28 March 1942	Torpedoed at Davao Gulf 8 June 1944
Naganami	長波	Dai-113	Fujinagata Shipyards, Osaka	5 April 1941	5 March 1942	30 June 1942	Air attack, Ormoc Bay, 11 November 1944
Makinami	巻波	Dai-114	Maizuru Naval Arsenal, Maizuru, Kyoto	11 April 1941	27 December 1941	8 August 1942	Sunk, Battle of Cape St. George, 25 November 1943
Takanami	高波	Dai-115	Uraga Dock Company, Uraga, Yokosuka	29 May 1941	16 March 1942	31 August 1942	Sunk, Battle of Tassafaronga, 30 November 1942
Ōnami	大波	Dai-116	Fujinagata Shipyards, Osaka	15 November 1941	13 August 1942	29 December 1942	Sunk, Battle of Cape St. George, 25 November 1943
Kiyonami	清波	Dai-117	Uraga Dock Company, Uraga, Yokosuka	15 October 1941	17 August 1942	25 January 1943	Air attack, NNW of Kolombangara 20 July 1943
Tamanami	玉波	Dai-118	Fujinagata Shipyards, Osaka	16 March 1942	26 December 1942	30 April 1943	Torpedoed, WSW of Manila, 7 July 1944
Suzunami	涼波	Dai-120	Uraga Dock Company, Uraga, Yokosuka	27 March 1942	26 December 1942	27 July 1943	Air attack, Rabaul, 11 November 1943
Fujinami	藤波	Dai-121	Fujinagata Shipyards, Osaka	25 August 1942	20 April 1943	31 July 1943	Air attack N of Iloilo 27 October 1944
Hayanami	早波	Dai-122	Maizuru Naval Arsenal, Maizuru, Kyoto	15 January 1942	19 December 1942	31 July 1943	Torpedoed near Tawi-Tawi, Philippines 7 June 1944
Hamanami	濱波	Dai-123	Maizuru Naval Arsenal, Maizuru, Kyoto	28 April 1942	18 April 1943	15 October 1943	Air attack, Ormoc Bay, 11 November 1944
Asashimo	朝霜	Dai-126	Fujinagata Shipyards, Osaka	21 January 1943	18 July 1943	27 November 1943	Air attack SW of Nagasaki 7 April 1945
Kishinami	岸波	Dai-125	Uraga Dock Company, Uraga, Yokosuka	29 August 1942	19 August 1943	3 December 1943	Torpedoed W of Palawan Island 4 December 1944
Okinami	沖波	Dai-124	Maizuru Naval Arsenal, Maizuru, Kyoto	5 August 1942	18 July 1943	10 December 1943	Air attack W of Manila, 13 November 1944
Hayashimo	早霜	Dai-127	Maizuru Naval Arsenal, Maizuru, Kyoto	20 January 1943	20 October 1943	20 February 1944	Air attack off Semirara Island 26 October 1944
Akishimo	秋霜	Dai-128	Fujinagata Shipyards, Osaka	3 May 1943	5 December 1943	11 March 1944	Air attack, Manila 13 November 1944
Kiyoshimo	清霜	Dai-129	Uraga Dock Company, Uraga, Yokosuka	16 March 1943	29 February 1944	15 May 1944	Torpedoed after air attack 26 December 1944

==== Shimakaze class (Type C) — 1 ship ====
The total excludes 16 cancelled.

Name	Kanji	Number	Builder	Laid down	Launched	Completed	Fate
Shimakaze	島風	Dai-119	Maizuru Naval Arsenal, Maizuru, Kyoto	8 August 1941	18 July 1942	10 May 1943	Sunk during Battle of Ormoc Bay 11 November 1944

==== Matsu class (Type D)— 18 ships ====
Name	Kanji	Builder	Laid down	Launched	Completed	Fate
Matsu	松	Maizuru Naval Arsenal, Maizuru, Kyoto	8 August 1943	3 February 1944	28 April 1944	Sunk on 4 August 1944 by US Navy ships 50 miles northwest of Chichijima (Ogasawara Islands)
Momo	桃	Maizuru Naval Arsenal, Maizuru, Kyoto	5 November 1943	25 March 1944	10 June 1944	Sunk 15 December 1944 by US Navy submarine USS Hawkbill 140 miles south-west of m.Bolinao (o-in Luzon)
Take	竹	Yokosuka Naval Arsenal, Yokosuka	15 October 1943	28 March 1944	16 June 1944	Surrendered to United Kingdom 16 July 1947 at Singapore, scrapped
Ume	梅	Fujinagata Shipyards, Osaka	25 January 1944	24 April 1944	28 June 1944	Sunk 31 January 1945 by US Army Air Force aircraft 20 miles south of Taiwan
Kuwa	桑	Fujinagata Shipyards, Osaka	20 December 1943	25 May 1944	15 July 1944	Sunk 3 December 1944 by US Navy destroyers during the Battle of Ormoc Bay (o-in Luzon)
Maki	槇	Maizuru Naval Arsenal, Maizuru, Kyoto	19 February 1944	10 June 1944	10 August 1944	Surrendered to United Kingdom on 14 August 1947 at Singapore, scrapped 1947
Kiri	桐	Yokosuka Naval Arsenal, Yokosuka	1 February 1944	27 May 1944	14 August 1944	Delivered to Soviet Union on 29 July 1947 at Nakhodka, renamed Vozrozhdionny (Возрождённый), converted to target ship TsL-25 (1949) and depot ship PM-65 (1957), scrapped in 1969.
Sugi	杉	Fujinagata Shipyards, Osaka	25 February 1944	3 July 1944	25 August 1944	Surrendered at Kure. Handed over to the Republic of China on 6 July 1947 in Shanghai, called ROCN Hui Yang. Removed from the ROC Navy list 11 November 1954 and scrapped.
Momi	樅	Yokosuka Naval Arsenal, Yokosuka	1 February 1944	16 June 1944	3 September 1944	Sunk on 5 January 1945 by US Navy carrier aircraft 28 miles west-southwest of Manila
Kashi	樫	Fujinagata Shipyards, Kyoto	5 May 1944	13 August 1944	30 September 1944	Surrendered to United States on 7 August 1947 at Sasebo, scrapped 20 March 1948
Kaya	榧	Maizuru Naval Arsenal, Maizuru, Kyoto	10 April 1944	30 July 1944	30 September 1944	Transferred to the Soviet Union 5 July 1947 in Nakhodka, renamed "Volevoy", converted to target ship "TSL-23" (1949), then to the floating heater "OT-61" (1958); excluded from the lists of the fleet on 1 August 1959 and scrapped.
Hinoki	檜	Yokosuka Naval Arsenal, Yokosuka	4 March 1944	4 July 1944	30 September 1944	Damaged 5 January by air attack while in company with the Momi, returned to Manila for repair and was sunk while leaving Manila Bay 7 January 1945 by US Navy destroyers
Kaede	楓	Yokosuka Naval Arsenal, Yokosuka	4 March 1944	25 June 1944	30 October 1944	Surrendered at Kure. Handed over to the Republic of China on 6 July 1947 in Shanghai, named ROCN Heng Yang. Removed from the ROC Navy list in 1950, then scrapped in 1962.
Sakura	櫻	Yokosuka Naval Arsenal, Yokosuka	2 June 1944	6 September 1944	25 November 1944	Sunk by a mine in the port of Osaka 11 July 1945
Nara	楢	Fujinagata Shipyards, Osaka	10 June 1944	12 October 1944	26 November 1944	Scrapped 1 July 1948
Tsubaki	椿	Maizuru Naval Arsenal, Maizuru, Kyoto	20 June 1944	30 September 1944	30 November 1944	Scrapped 28 July 1948
Keyaki	欅	Yokosuka Naval Arsenal, Yokosuka	22 June 1944	30 September 1944	15 December 1944	Surrendered to United States on 5 July 1947 at Yokosuka, Sunk as target off 34°44′N 140°01′E, 29 October 1947
Yanagi	柳	Fujinagata Shipyards, Osaka	20 August 1944	25 November 1944	8 January 1945	Heavily damaged by aircraft and ran aground on 14 July 1945 at Ōminato, scrapped on 1 April 1947

==== Tachibana class (Modified Matsu - Type D Kai) — 14 ships ====
The total excludes 9 never completed and cancelled units

Name	Kanji	Number	Builder	Laid down	Launched	Completed	Fate
Tachibana	橘	Yokosuka Naval Arsenal, Yokosuka	8 July 1944	14 October 1944	20 January 1945	Sunk on 14 July 1945 by US Navy carrier aircraft off Hakodate	
Nire	楡	Maizuru Naval Arsenal, Maizuru, Kyoto	14 August 1944	25 November 1944	31 January 1945	Scrapped April 1948	
Tsuta	蔦	Yokosuka Naval Arsenal, Yokosuka	31 July 1944	2 November 1944	8 February 1945	Surrendered at Kure. Used to repatriate Japanese. Handed over to the Republic of China on 31 July 1947 in Shanghai. It was renamed ROCN Hua Yang, removed from the ROC Navy list on 11 November 1954.	
Hagi	萩	Yokosuka Naval Arsenal, Yokosuka	11 September 1944	27 November 1944	1 March 1945	Surrendered to United Kingdom on 16 July 1947 at Singapore, scrapped	
Kaki	柿	Yokosuka Naval Arsenal, Yokosuka	5 October 1944	11 December 1944	5 March 1945	Surrendered to United States on 4 July 1947 at Qingdao. Sunk as target off 35°29′N 123°35′E, 19 August 1947	
Shii	椎	Maizuru Naval Arsenal, Maizuru, Kyoto	18 September 1944	13 January 1945	13 March 1945	Delivered to Soviet Union on 5 July 1947 at Nakhodka, renamed Vol'ny, converted to target ship TSL-24 (1949), scrapped in 1960.	
Nashi	梨	Kawasaki Dockyards, Kobe	1 September 1944	17 January 1945	15 March 1945	Sunk 28 July 1945 at Kure by US aircraft. Salvaged on 30 September 1954, Transferred to JDS Wakaba on 31 May 1956. Refitted in 1958 as a radar trials ship; sonar added in 1960. Struck on 31 March 1971 and scrapped 1972–1973.	
Sumire	菫	Yokosuka Naval Arsenal, Yokosuka	21 October 1944	27 December 1944	26 March 1945	Surrendered to United Kingdom on 23 August 1947 at Hong Kong, sunk as target 1947	
Enoki	榎	Maizuru Naval Arsenal, Maizuru, Kyoto	14 October 1944	27 January 1945	31 March 1945	Sunk 26 June 1945 sunk in shallow water by contact mine at Obama, Fukui, raised and scrapped 1948	
Kusunoki	楠	Yokosuka Naval Arsenal, Yokosuka	9 November 1944	8 January 1945	28 April 1945	Surrendered to United Kingdom on 1947	
Odake	雄竹	Maizuru Naval Arsenal, Maizuru, Kyoto	5 November 1944	10 March 1945	15 May 1945	Surrendered to United States on 14 July 1947 at Qingdao. Sunk as target off 35°29′N 122°52′E, 17 September 1947	
Hatsuzakura	初櫻	Yokosuka Naval Arsenal, Yokosuka	4 December 1944	10 February 1945	18 May 1945	Delivered to Soviet Union on 29 July 1947 at Nakhodka, renamed Vetrenny and soon Vyrazitelny, converted to target ship TSL-26 (1949), scrapped in 1958.	
Kaba	樺	Fujinagata Shipyards, Osaka	15 October 1944	27 February 1945	29 May 1945	Surrendered to United States on 4 August 1947 at Sasebo, scrapped 1 March 1948	
Hatsuume	初梅	Maizuru Naval Arsenal, Maizuru, Kyoto	8 December 1944	25 April 1945	18 June 1945	Surrendered at Maizuru. Handed over to the Republic of China on 6 July 1947 in Shanghai, called ROCN Xin Yang. Removed from the ROC Navy list and scrapped 1961.	

== Japan Maritime Self-Defense Force ==
=== Standard Destroyer ===
==== Gleaves class/Asakaze class (DD) — 2 ships transferred 1954 from USA ====
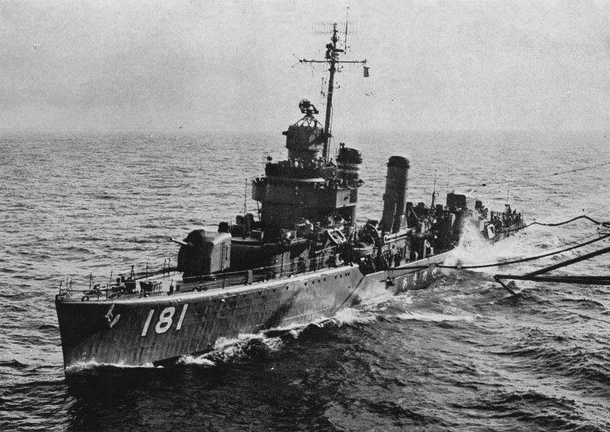
DD-181 Asakaze after being transferred to the JMSDF

Name	Kana	Hull no.	Builder	Laid down	Launched	Completed	Fate
Asakaze (ex-USS Ellyson)	あさかぜ	DD-181	Federal Shipbuilding and Drydock Company, Kearny, New Jersey, United States	20 December 1940	26 July 1941	28 November 1941	Transferred JMSDF 19 October 1954, Returned to U.S. 1970, sold to Taiwan for spare parts
Hatakaze (ex-USS Macomb)	はたかぜ	DD-182	Bath Iron Works, Bath, Maine, United States	3 September 1940	23 September 1941	26 January 1942	Transferred JMSDF 19 October 1954, Returned to U.S. 1969, sold to Taiwan and renamed ROCS Hsien Yang, struck 1974

==== Fletcher class/Ariake class (DD) — 2 ships transferred 1959 from USA ====
Name	Kana	Hull no.	Builder	Laid down	Launched	Completed	Fate
Ariake (ex-USS Heywood L. Edwards)	ありあけ	DD-183	Boston Navy Yard, Boston, Massachusetts, United States	4 July 1943	6 October 1943	26 January 1944	Transferred JMSDF 10 March 1959, Scrapped 1976
Yūgure (ex-USS Richard P. Leary)	ゆうぐれ	DD-184	Boston Navy Yard, Boston, Massachusetts, United States	4 July 1943	6 October 1943	23 February 1944	Transferred JMSDF 10 March 1959, Returned to U.S. 10 March 1974, Scrapped 1 July 1976

==== Harukaze class (DD) — 2 ships ====
Name	Kana	Hull no.	Builder	Laid down	Launched	Completed	Fate
Harukaze	はるかぜ	DD-101/ASU-7002	Mitsubishi Shipyards, Nagasaki	15 December 1954	20 September 1955	26 April 1956	Decommissioned 5 March 1985, Dismantled 19 November 2001
Yukikaze	ゆきかぜ	DD-102/ASU-7003	Mitsubishi Shipyards, Nagasaki	17 December 1954	20 August 1955	31 July 1956	Decommissioned 27 March 1985, Dismantled 19 November 2001

==== Ayanami class (DDK) — 7 ships ====
Name	Kana	Hull no.	Builder	Laid down	Launched	Completed	Fate
Ayanami	あやなみ	DD-103/ASU-7004	Mitsubishi Shipyards, Nagasaki	20 November 1956	12 February 1957	12 February 1958	Decommissioned 25 December 1986, scrapped
Uranami	うらなみ	DD-105/ASU-7005	Kawasaki Dockyards, Kobe	1 February 1957	29 August 1957	27 February 1958	Decommissioned 25 December 1986, scrapped
Isonami	いそなみ	DD-104/TV-3502	Mitsubishi Shipyards, Kobe	14 December 1956	30 September 1957	14 March 1958	Decommissioned 1 July 1987, sank as tarket ship 1988
Shikinami	しきなみ	DD-106/TV-3503	Mitsui Engineering & Shipbuilding, Tamano, Okayama	14 December 1956	25 September 1957	15 March 1958	Decommissioned 1 July 1987, scrapped 1988
Takanami	たかなみ	DD-110/ASU-7009	Mitsui Engineering & Shipbuilding, Tamano, Okayama	8 November 1958	8 August 1959	30 January 1960	Decommissioned 24 March 1989, scrapped
Ōnami	おおなみ	DD-111/ASU-7013	Ishikawajima Shipyards, Tokyo	20 March 1959	13 February 1960	29 August 1960	Decommissioned 23 March 1990, scrapped
Makinami	まきなみ	DD-112/ASU-7014	Hitachi Zosen, Maizuru, Kyoto	20 March 1959	25 April 1960	28 October 1960	Decommissioned 23 March 1990, scrapped

==== Murasame class (1958) (DDA) — 3 ships ====
Name	Kana	Hull no.	Builder	Laid down	Launched	Completed	Fate
Murasame	むらさめ	DD-107/ASU-7006	Mitsubishi Shipyards, Nagasaki	17 December 1957	31 July 1958	28 February 1959	Decommissioned 23 March 1988, scrapped
Yūdachi	ゆうだち	DD-108/ASU-7007	Mitsubishi Shipyards, Nagasaki	16 December 1957	29 July 1958	25 March 1959	Decommissioned 24 March 1987, scrapped
Harusame	はるさめ	DD-109/ASU-7008	Mitsubishi Shipyards, Nagasaki	17 June 1958	18 June 1959	15 December 1959	Decommissioned 31 May 1989, scrapped

==== Akizuki class (1959) (DD) — 2 ships ====
Name	Kana	Hull no.	Builder	Laid down	Launched	Completed	Fate
Akizuki	あきづき	DD-161/ASU-7010	Mitsubishi Shipyards, Nagasaki	31 July 1958	26 June 1959	13 February 1960	Decommissioned 7 December 1993, scrapped
Teruzuki	てるづき	DD-162/ASU-7012/TV-3504	Mitsubishi Shipyards, Kobe	15 August 1958	24 June 1959	19 February 1960	Decommissioned 27 September 1993, sunk as target ship 14 July 1994

==== Yamagumo class (DDK) — 6 ships ====
Name	Kana	Hull no.	Builder	Laid down	Launched	Completed	Fate
Yamagumo	やまぐも	DD-113/TV-3506	Mitsui Engineering & Shipbuilding, Tamano, Okayama	23 March 1964	27 February 1965	29 January 1966	Decommissioned 1 August 1995, scrapped
Makigumo	まきぐも	DD-114/TV-3507	Uraga Dock Company, Uraga, Yokosuka	10 June 1964	26 July 1965	19 March 1966	Decommissioned 1 August 1995, scrapped
Asagumo	あさぐも	DD-115/ASU-7018	Hitachi Zosen, Maizuru, Kyoto	24 June 1965	25 November 1966	29 August 1967	Decommissioned 24 March 1998, scrapped
Aokumo	あおくも	DD-119/TV-3512	Sumitomo, Uraga, Yokosuka	2 October 1970	20 March 1972	25 November 1972	Decommissioned 13 June 2003, scrapped
Akigumo	あきぐも	DD-120/TV-3514	Sumitomo, Uraga, Yokosuka	7 July 1972	23 October 1973	24 July 1974	Decommissioned 16 February 2005, scrapped
Yūgumo	ゆうぐも	DD-121	Sumitomo, Uraga, Yokosuka	4 February 1976	21 May 1977	24 March 1978	Decommissioned 17 June 2005, scrapped

==== Takatsuki class (DDA) — 4 ships ====
Name	Kana	Hull no.	Builder	Laid down	Launched	Completed	Fate
Takatsuki	たかつき	DD-164	Ishikawajima Shipyards, Tokyo	8 October 1964	7 January 1966	15 March 1967	Decommissioned 16 August 2002, scrapped September 2003
Kikuzuki	きくづき	DD-165	Mitsubishi Shipyard, Nagasaki	15 March 1966	25 March 1967	27 March 1968	Decommissioned 6 November 2003, scrapped April 2005
Mochizuki	もちづき	DD-166/ASU-7019	Ishikawajima Shipyards, Tokyo	22 November 1966	15 March 1968	25 March 1969	Decommissioned 19 March 1999, scrapped
Nagatsuki	ながつき	DD-167	Mitsubishi Shipyard, Nagasaki	2 March 1968	19 March 1969	12 February 1970	Decommissioned 19 March 1996, sunk as target ship 3 August 1997

==== Minegumo class (DDK) — 3 ships ====
Name	Kana	Hull no.	Builder	Laid down	Launched	Completed	Fate
Minegumo	みねぐも	DD-116/TV-3509	Mitsui Engineering & Shipbuilding, Tamano, Okayama	14 March 1967	16 August 1967	31 August 1968	Decommissioned 18 March 1999, scrapped
Natsugumo	なつぐも	DD-117/TV-3510	Uraga Dock Company, Uraga, Yokosuka	26 June 1967	25 July 1968	25 April 1969	Decommissioned 18 March 1999, scrapped
Murakumo	むらくも	DD-118/TV-3511	Hitachi Zosen, Osaka	19 October 1968	15 November 1969	21 August 1970	Decommissioned 13 June 2000, scrapped

==== Hatsuyuki class (DD) — 12 ships ====
Name	Kana	Hull no.	Builder	Laid down	Launched	Completed	Fate
Shirayuki	しらゆき	DD-123	Hitachi Zosen, Osaka	3 December 1979	4 August 1981	8 February 1982	Decommissioned 27 April 2016, scrapped
Hatsuyuki	はつゆき	DD-122	Sumitomo, Uraga, Yokosuka	14 March 1979	7 November 1980	23 March 1982	Decommissioned 24 February 2011, scrapped
Hamayuki	はまゆき	DD-126	Mitsui Engineering & Shipbuilding, Tamano, Okayama	4 February 1981	27 May 1982	18 November 1983	Decommissioned 14 March 2012, sunk as target ship October 2013
Mineyuki	みねゆき	DD-124	Mitsubishi Shipyard, Tokyo	7 May 1981	19 October 1982	26 January 1984	Decommissioned 7 March 2013, scrapped
Sawayuki	さわゆき	DD-125	Ishikawajima Shipyards, Tokyo	22 April 1981	21 June 1982	15 February 1984	Decommissioned 1 April 2013
Isoyuki	いそゆき	DD-127	Ishikawajima Shipyards, Tokyo	20 April 1982	19 September 1983	23 January 1985	Decommissioned 13 March 2014, scrapped
Haruyuki	はるゆき	DD-128	Ishikawajima Shipyards, Tokyo	11 March 1982	6 September 1983	14 March 1985	Decommissioned 13 March 2014, scrapped
Yamayuki	やまゆき	DD-129/TV-3519	Hitachi Zosen, Maizuru, Kyoto	25 February 1983	10 July 1984	3 December 1985	Decommissioned 19 March 2020
Matsuyuki	まつゆき	DD-130	Ishikawajima Shipyards, Tokyo	7 April 1983	25 October 1984	19 March 1986	Decommissioned 7 April 2021
Setoyuki	せとゆき	DD-131/TV-3518	Mitsui Shipbuilding, Tamano	26 January 1984	3 July 1985	17 December 1986	Decommissioned 23 December 2021
Asayuki	あさゆき	DD-132	Sumitomo, Uraga, Yokosuka	22 December 1983	16 October 1985	20 February 1987	Decommissioned 16 November 2020
Shimayuki	しまゆき	DD-133/TV-3513	Mitsubishi Shipyard, Tokyo	8 May 1984	29 January 1986	17 February 1987	Decommissioned 19 March 2021

==== Asagiri class (DD) — 8 ships ====
Name	Kana	Hull no.	Builder	Laid down	Launched	Completed	Fate
Asagiri	あさぎり	DD-151	Ishikawajima Shipyards, Tokyo	13 February 1985	19 September 1986	17 March 1988	Homeport JMSDF Maizuru Naval Base
Yamagiri	やまぎり	DD-152	Mitsui Engineering & Shipbuilding, Tamano, Okayama	3 March 1986	10 October 1987	25 January 1989	Homeport JMSDF Yokosuka Naval Base
Yūgiri	ゆうぎり	DD-153	Sumitomo, Uraga, Yokosuka	25 February 1986	21 September 1987	28 February 1989	Homeport JMSDF Yokosuka Naval Base
Amagiri	あまぎり	DD-154	Ishikawajima Shipyards, Tokyo	3 March 1986	9 September 1987	28 February 1989	Homeport JMSDF Yokosuka Naval Base
Hamagiri	はまぎり	DD-155	Hitachi Zosen, Maizuru, Kyoto	20 January 1987	4 June 1988	31 January 1990	Homeport JMSDF Yokosuka Naval Base
Setogiri	せとぎり	DD-156	Hitachi Zosen, Maizuru, Kyoto	9 March 1987	12 September 1988	14 February 1990	Homeport JMSDF Maizuru Naval Base
Sawagiri	さわぎり	DD-157	Mitsubishi Shipyard, Nagasaki	14 January 1987	25 September 1988	6 March 1990	Homeport JMSDF Sasebo Naval Base
Umigiri	うみぎり	DD-158	Ishikawajima Shipyards, Tokyo	31 October 1988	9 November 1989	12 March 1991	Homeport JMSDF Kure Naval Base

==== Murasame class (1994) (DD) — 9 ships ====
(orders for 5 more were replaced by those for the succeeding Takanami class)

Name	Kana	Hull no.	Builder	Laid down	Launched	Completed	Fate
Murasame	むらさめ	DD-101	Ishikawajima Shipyards, Tokyo	18 August 1993	23 August 1994	12 March 1996	Homeport JMSDF Yokosuka Naval Base
Harusame	はるさめ	DD-102	Mitsui Engineering & Shipbuilding, Tamano, Okayama	11 August 1994	16 October 1995	24 March 1997	Homeport JMSDF Sasebo Naval Base
Yūdachi	ゆうだち	DD-103	Mitsui Engineering & Shipbuilding, Tamano, Okayama	18 March 1996	19 August 1997	4 March 1999	Homeport JMSDF Ōminato Naval Base
Kirisame	きりさめ	DD-104	Mitsubishi Shipyard, Nagasaki	3 April 1996	21 August 1997	18 March 1999	Homeport JMSDF Sasebo Naval Base
Inazuma	いなづま	DD-105	Mitsubishi Shipyard, Nagasaki	8 May 1997	9 September 1998	15 March 2000	Homeport JMSDF Kure Naval Base
Samidare	さみだれ	DD-106	Ishikawajima Shipyards, Tokyo	11 September 1997	24 September 1998	21 March 2000	Homeport JMSDF Kure Naval Base
Ikazuchi	いかづち	DD-107	Hitachi Zosen, Maizuru, Kyoto	25 February 1998	24 June 1999	14 March 2001	Homeport JMSDF Yokosuka Naval Base
Ariake	ありあけ	DD-109	Mitsubishi Shipyard, Kobe	18 May 1999	16 October 2000	6 March 2002	Homeport JMSDF Sasebo Naval Base
Akebono	あけぼの	DD-108	Ishikawajima Shipyards, Tokyo	29 October 1999	25 September 2000	19 March 2002	Homeport JMSDF Kure Naval Base

==== Takanami class (DD) — 5 ships ====
Name	Kana	Hull no.	Builder	Laid down	Launched	Completed	Fate
Takanami	たかなみ	DD-110	Ishikawajima Shipyards, Tokyo	25 April 2000	26 July 2001	12 March 2003	Homeport JMSDF Yokosuka Naval Base
Ōnami	おおなみ	DD-111	Mitsubishi Shipyard, Nagasaki	17 May 2000	20 September 2001	13 March 2003	Homeport JMSDF Yokosuka Naval Base
Makinami	まきなみ	DD-112	Ishikawajima Shipyards, Tokyo	17 July 2001	8 August 2002	18 March 2004	Homeport JMSDF Ōminato Naval Base
Sazanami	さざなみ	DD-113	Mitsubishi Shipyard, Nagasaki	4 April 2002	29 August 2003	16 February 2005	Homeport JMSDF Kure Naval Base
Suzunami	すずなみ	DD-114	Ishikawajima Shipyards, Tokyo	24 September 2003	26 August 2004	16 February 2006	Homeport JMSDF Ōminato Naval Base

==== Akizuki class (DD) — 4 ships ====
Name	Kana	Hull no.	Builder	Laid down	Launched	Completed	Fate
Akizuki	あきづき	DD-115	Mitsubishi Shipyard, Nagasaki	17 July 2009	13 October 2010	14 March 2012	Homeport JMSDF Sasebo Naval Base
Teruzuki	てるづき	DD-116	Mitsubishi Shipyard, Nagasaki	2 June 2010	15 September 2011	7 March 2013	Homeport JMSDF Yokosuka Naval Base
Suzutsuki	すずつき	DD-117	Mitsubishi Shipyard, Nagasaki	18 May 2011	17 October 2012	12 March 2014	Homeport JMSDF Sasebo Naval Base
Fuyuzuki	ふゆづき	DD-118	Mitsui Engineering & Shipbuilding, Tamano, Okayama	14 June 2011	22 August 2012	13 March 2014	Homeport JMSDF Maizuru Naval Base

==== Asahi class (DD) — 2 ships ====
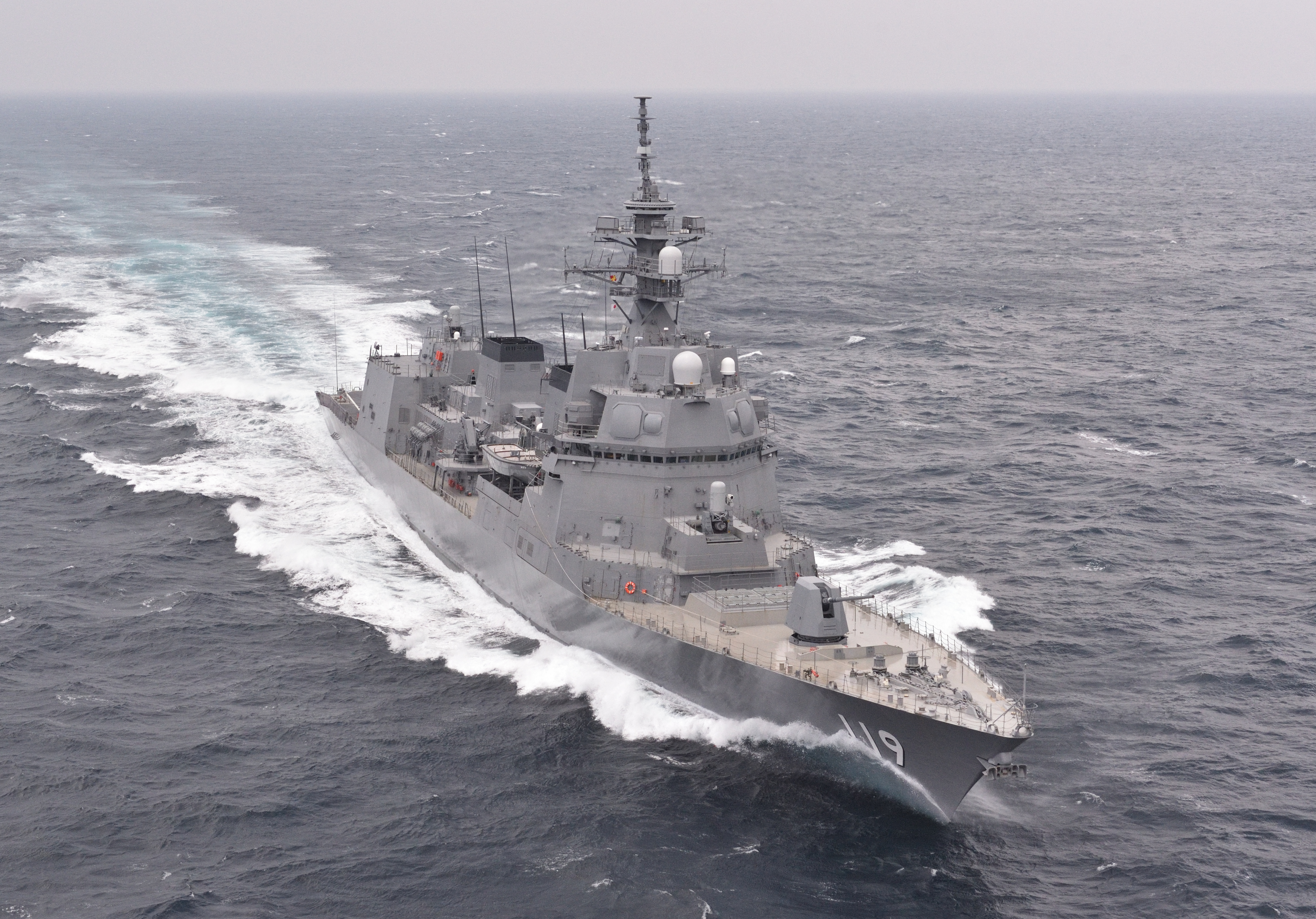
JS Asahi, one of the newest ships of the JMSDF.

Name	Kana	Hull no.	Builder	Laid down	Launched	Completed	Fate
Asahi	あさひ	DD-119	Mitsubishi Shipyard, Nagasaki	4 August 2015	19 October 2016	7 March 2018	Homeport JMSDF Sasebo Naval Base
Shiranui	しらぬい	DD-120	Mitsubishi Shipyard, Nagasaki	20 May 2016	12 October 2017	27 February 2019	Homeport JMSDF Ōminato Naval Base

=== Guided Missile Destroyer ===
==== JDS Amatsukaze (DDG) — 1 ship ====
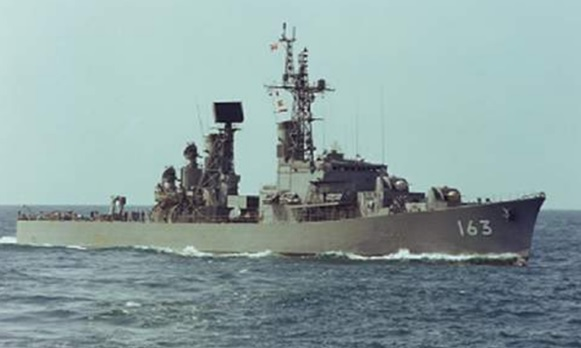
JDS Amatsukaze, Japan's first guided missile destroyer.

Name	Kana	Hull no.	Builder	Laid down	Launched	Completed	Fate
JDS Amatsukaze	あまつかぜ	DDG-163	Mitsubishi Shipyard, Nagasaki	29 November 1962	5 October 1963	15 February 1965	Decommissioned 29 November 1995, sunk as target

==== Tachikaze class (DDG) — 3 ships ====
Name	Kana	Hull no.	Builder	Laid down	Launched	Completed	Fate
Tachikaze	たちかぜ	DDG-168	Mitsubishi Shipyard, Nagasaki	19 June 1973	12 December 1974	26 March 1976	Decommissioned 15 January 2007, sunk as target June 2009
Asakaze	あさかぜ	DDG-169	Mitsubishi Shipyard, Nagasaki	27 May 1976	15 October 1977	27 March 1979	Decommissioned 12 March 2008, scrapped October 2009
Sawakaze	さわかぜ	DDG-170	Mitsubishi Shipyard, Nagasaki	14 September 1979	4 June 1981	30 March 1983	Decommissioned 25 June 2010, scrapped April 2011

==== Hatakaze class (DDG) — 2 ships ====
Name	Kana	Hull no.	Builder	Laid down	Launched	Completed	Fate
Hatakaze	はたかぜ	DDG-171/TV-3520	Mitsubishi Shipyard, Nagasaki	20 May 1983	9 November 1984	27 March 1986	Converted to training vessel 19 March 2020
Shimakaze	しまかぜ	DDG-172/TV-3521	Mitsubishi Shipyard, Nagasaki	13 January 1985	30 January 1987	23 March 1988	Converted to training vessel 19 March 2020

==== Kongō class (DDG) — 4 ships ====
Name	Kana	Hull no.	Builder	Laid down	Launched	Completed	Fate
Kongō	こんごう	DDG-173	Mitsubishi Shipyard, Nagasaki	8 May 1990	26 September 1991	25 March 1993	Homeport JMSDF Sasebo Naval Base
Kirishima	きりしま	DDG-174	Mitsubishi Shipyard, Nagasaki	7 April 1992	19 August 1993	16 March 1995	Homeport JMSDF Yokosuka Naval Base
Myōkō	みょうこう	DDG-175	Mitsubishi Shipyard, Nagasaki	8 April 1993	5 October 1994	14 March 1996	Homeport JMSDF Maizuru Naval Base
Chōkai	ちょうかい	DDG-176	Ishikawajima Shipyards, Tokyo	29 May 1995	27 August 1996	20 March 1998	Homeport JMSDF Sasebo Naval Base

==== Atago class (DDG) — 2 ships ====
Name	Kana	Hull no.	Builder	Laid down	Launched	Completed	Fate
Atago	あたご	DDG-177	Mitsubishi Shipyard, Nagasaki	5 April 2004	24 August 2005	15 March 2007	Homeport JMSDF Maizuru Naval Base
Ashigara	あしがら	DDG-178	Mitsubishi Shipyard, Nagasaki	6 April 2005	30 August 2006	13 March 2008	Homeport JMSDF Sasebo Naval Base

==== Maya class (DDG) — 2 ships ====
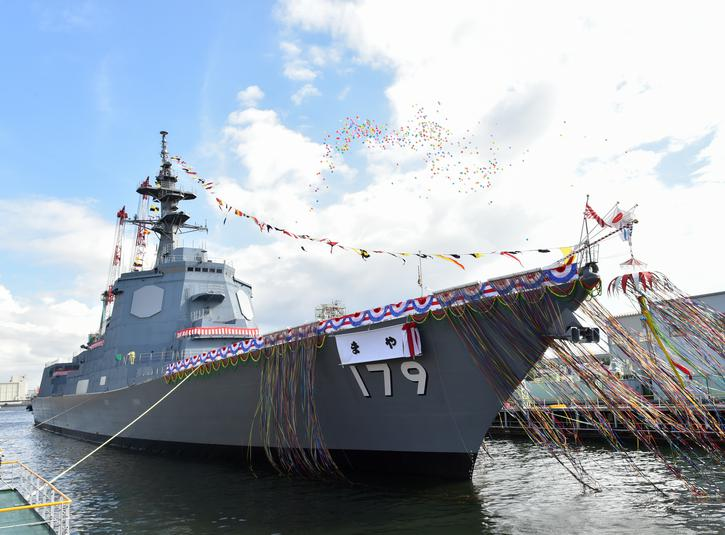
JS Maya, the latest DDG built by Japan.

Name	Kana	Hull no.	Builder	Laid down	Launched	Completed	Fate
JS Maya	まや	DDG-179	Japan Marine United, Yokohama	17 April 2017	30 July 2018	19 March 2020	Homeport JMSDF Yokosuka Naval Base
JS Haguro	はぐろ	DDG-180	Japan Marine United, Yokohama	23 January 2018	17 July 2019	19 March 2021	

=== Helicopter Destroyer ===
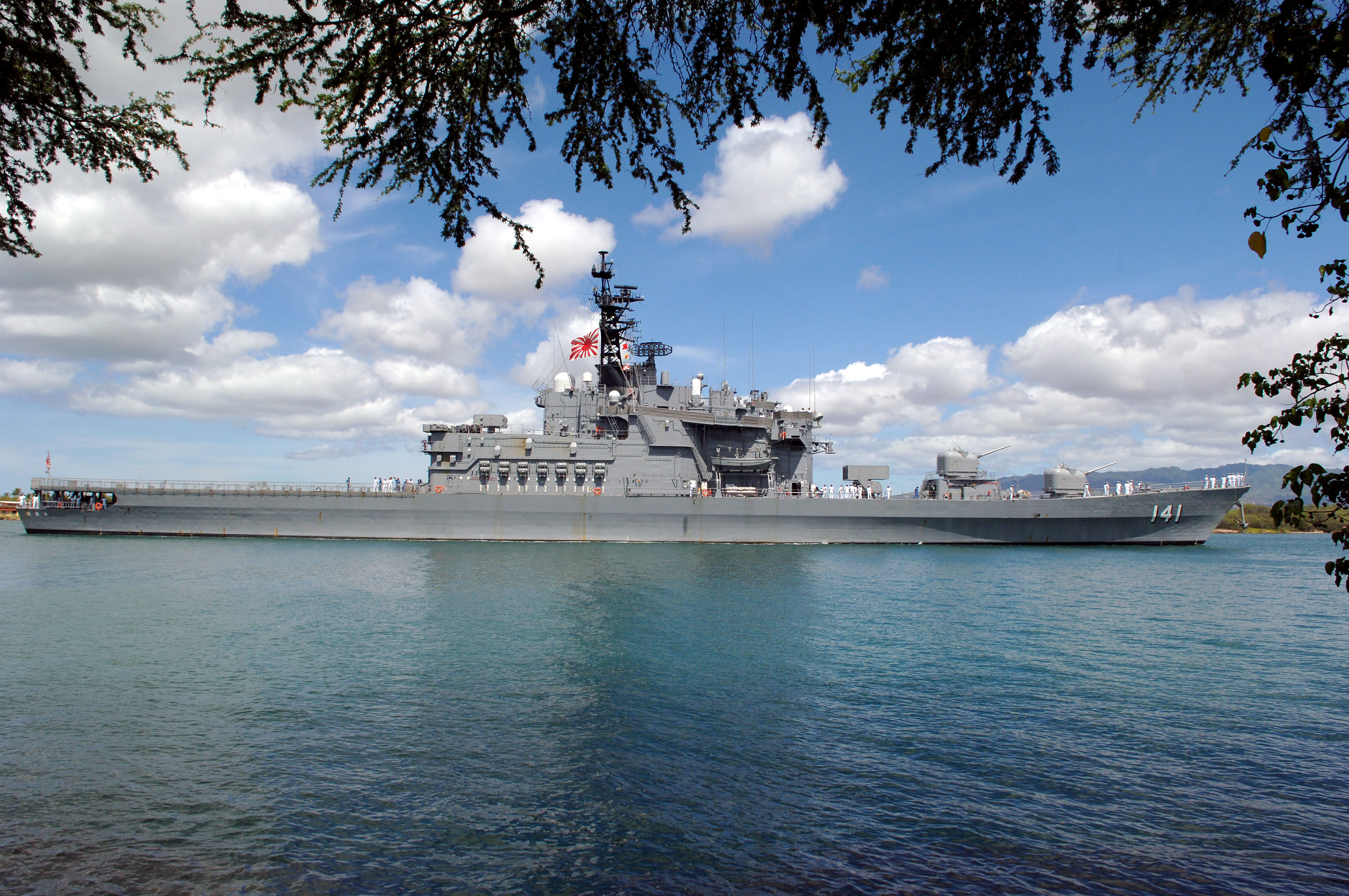
JS Haruna, design as the center piece of the JMSDF fleet.

==== Haruna class (DDH) — 2 ships ====
Name	Kana	Hull no.	Builder	Laid down	Launched	Completed	Fate
Haruna	はるな	DDH-141	Mitsubishi Shipyard, Nagasaki	19 March 1970	1 February 1972	22 March 1973	Decommissioned 18 March 2009, scrapped January 2010
Hiei	ひえい	DDH-142	Ishikawajima Shipyards, Tokyo	8 March 1972	13 August 1973	27 December 1974	Decommissioned 16 March 2011, scrapped

==== Shirane class (DDH) — 2 ships ====
Name	Kana	Hull no.	Builder	Laid down	Launched	Completed	Fate
Shirane	しらね	DDH-143	Ishikawajima Shipyards, Tokyo	25 February 1977	18 September 1978	17 March 1980	Decommissioned 25 March 2015, scrapped
Kurama	くらま	DDH-144	Ishikawajima Shipyards, Tokyo	17 February 1978	20 September 1979	27 March 1981	Decommissioned 22 March 2017, sunk as target June 2018

==== Hyūga class (DDH) — 2 ships ====
Name	Kana	Hull no.	Builder	Laid down	Launched	Completed	Fate
Hyūga	ひゅうが	DDH-181	Ishikawajima Shipyards, Tokyo	11 May 2006	23 August 2007	18 March 2009	Homeport JMSDF Maizuru Naval Base
Ise	いせ	DDH-182	Ishikawajima Shipyards, Tokyo	30 May 2008	21 August 2009	16 March 2011	Homeport JMSDF Sasebo Naval Base

==== Izumo class (DDH) — 2 ships ====
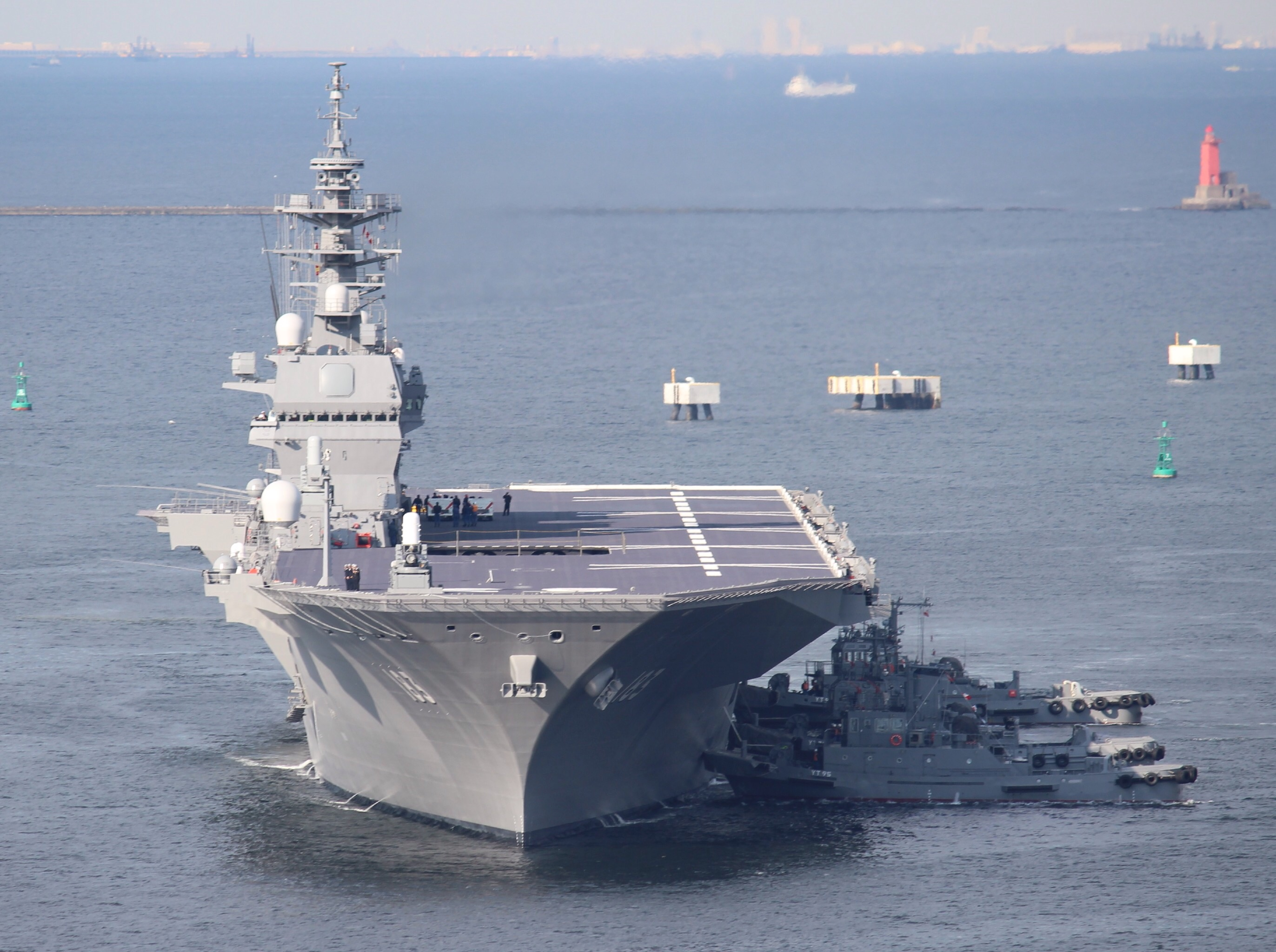
Izumo-class helicopter destroyer (carrier), the largest class of ships built by Japan since WW2.

(Re-designated as "Aircraft-carrying multi-role escort ship" CVM)

Name	Kana	Hull no.	Builder	Laid down	Launched	Completed	Fate
Izumo	いずも	DDH-183	Ishikawajima Shipyards, Tokyo	27 January 2012	6 August 2013	25 March 2015	Homeport JMSDF Yokosuka Naval Base
Kaga	かが	DDH-184	Ishikawajima Shipyards, Tokyo	7 October 2013	27 August 2015	22 March 2017	Homeport JMSDF Kure Naval Base

=== Small Escort ===
==== Tachibana class – 1 ship ====
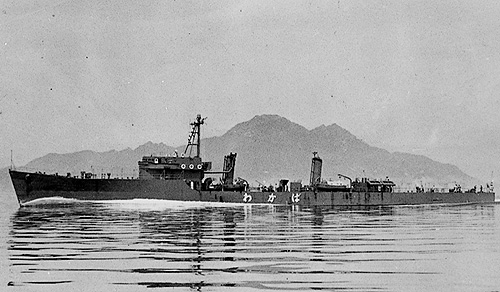
JDS Wakaba, the only ship that serve both the IJN and the JMSDF.

Name	Kana	Hull no.	Builder	Laid down	Launched	Completed	Fate
Wakaba (ex-IJN Nashi)	わかば	DE-261	Kawasaki Dockyards, Kobe	1 September 1944	17 January 1945	15 March 1945	Transferred to JMSDF 31 May 1956, struck on 31 March 1971, scrapped 1972–1973.

==== Cannon class (DE) — 2 ships transferred 1955 from USA ====
Name	Kana	Hull no.	Builder	Laid down	Launched	Completed	Fate
Asahi (ex-USS Amick)	あさひ	DE-262	Federal Shipbuilding and Drydock Company, Kearny, New Jersey, United States	7 January 1943	27 May 1943	26 July 1943	Transferred to JMSDF 14 June 1955, returned to U.S. 1975, transferred to Philippines and renamed Datu Sikatuna 13 September 1976, decommissioned 1989
Hatsuhi (ex-USS Atherton)	はつひ	DE-263	Federal Shipbuilding and Drydock Company, Kearny, New Jersey, United States	14 January 1943	27 May 1943	29 August 1943	Transferred to JMSDF 14 June 1955, returned to U.S. 1975, transferred to Philippines and renamed Rajah Humabon 23 December 1978, decommissioned 15 March 2018

==== JDS Akebono (DE) - 1 ship ====
Name	Kana	Hull no.	Builder	Laid down	Launched	Completed	Fate
JDS Akebono	あけぼの	DE-201	Ishikawajima Shipyards, Tokyo	10 December 1954	30 October 1955	20 March 1956	Decommissioned 1976, struck 1981

==== Ikazuchi class (DE) — 2 ships ====
Name	Kana	Hull no.	Builder	Laid down	Launched	Completed	Fate
Inazuma	いなづま	DE-203/YAC-31	Mitsui Engineering & Shipbuilding, Tamano, Okayama	25 December 1954	4 August 1955	5 March 1956	Decommissioned 15 March 1977, struck 30 March 1983, scrapped
Ikazuchi	いかづち	DE-202/YAC-30	Kawasaki Shipyard, Kobe	18 December 1954	6 September 1955	29 May 1956	Decommissioned 31 March 1976, struck 30 March 1983, scrapped

==== Isuzu class (DE)— 4 ships ====
Name	Kana	Hull no.	Builder	Laid down	Launched	Completed	Fate
Isuzu	いすず	DE-211/ASU-7015	Mitsui Engineering & Shipbuilding, Tamano, Okayama	16 April 1960	17 January 1961	29 July 1961	Decommissioned 8 April 1988, struck 25 March 1995, scrapped
Mogami	もがみ	DE-212/TV-3505	Mitsubishi Shipyard, Kobe	4 August 1960	7 March 1961	28 October 1961	Decommissioned 1 July 1987, struck 20 June 1991, scrapped
Ōi	おおい	DE-214/ASU-7017	Hitachi Zosen, Osaka	10 July 1962	15 June 1963	22 January 1964	Decommissioned 31 January 1990, struck 15 February 1993, scrapped
Kitakami	きたかみ	DE-213/ASU-7016	Ishikawajima Shipyards, Tokyo	7 July 1962	21 June 1963	27 February 1964	Decommissioned 31 January 1990, struck 16 November 1993, scrapped

==== Chikugo class (DE)— 11 ships ====
Name	Kana	Hull no.	Builder	Laid down	Launched	Completed	Fate
Ayase	あやせ	DE-216	Mitsubishi Shipyard, Tokyo	5 December 1969	16 September 1970	20 May 1971	Decommissioned 1 August 1996, scrapped
Chikugo	ちくご	DE-215	Mitsui Engineering & Shipbuilding, Tamano, Okayama	9 December 1968	13 January 1970	31 July 1971	Decommissioned 1996, struck 1999, scrapped
Mikuma	みくま	DE-217	Mitsui Engineering & Shipbuilding, Osaka	17 March 1970	16 February 1971	26 August 1971	Decommissioned 8 July 1997, scrapped
Tokachi	とかち	DE-218	Mitsui Engineering & Shipbuilding, Tamano, Okayama	11 December 1970	25 November 1971	17 May 1972	Decommissioned 15 April 1998, scrapped 1999
Iwase	いわせ	DE-219	Mitsui Engineering & Shipbuilding, Tamano, Okayama	6 August 1971	29 June 1972	12 December 1972	Decommissioned 6 October 1998, scrapped
Chitose	ちとせ	DE-220	Hitachi Zosen, Maizuru, Kyoto	7 October 1970	25 January 1973	31 August 1973	Decommissioned 13 April 1999, scrapped
Niyodo	によど	DE-221	Mitsui Engineering & Shipbuilding, Tamano, Okayama	20 September 1972	28 August 1973	8 February 1974	Decommissioned 24 June 1999, scrapped
Teshio	てしお	DE-222	Hitachi Zosen, Maizuru, Kyoto	11 July 1973	29 May 1974	10 January 1975	Decommissioned 27 June 2000, scrapped
Yoshino	よしの	DE-223	Mitsui Engineering & Shipbuilding, Tamano, Okayama	28 September 1973	22 August 1974	6 February 1975	Decommissioned 15 May 2001, scrapped
Kumano	くまの	DE-224	Hitachi Zosen, Osaka	29 May 1974	24 February 1975	19 November 1975	Decommissioned 18 May 2001, scrapped
Noshiro	のしろ	DE-225	Mitsui Engineering & Shipbuilding, Tamano, Okayama	27 January 1976	23 December 1976	30 June 1977	Decommissioned 13 March 2003, scrapped

==== JS Ishikari (DE) - 1 ship ====
Name	Kana	Hull no.	Builder	Laid down	Launched	Completed	Fate
JS Ishikari	いしかり	DE-226	Mitsui Engineering & Shipbuilding, Tamano, Okayama	17 May 1979	18 March 1980	28 March 1981	Decommissioned 17 October 2007, struck November 2008, scrapped

==== Yūbari class (DE)— 2 ships ====
Name	Kana	Hull no.	Builder	Laid down	Launched	Completed	Fate
Yūbari	ゆうばり	DE-227	Sumitomo, Uraga, Yokosuka	9 February 1981	22 February 1982	18 March 1983	Decommissioned 25 June 2010, struck June 2012, scrapped
Yūbetsu	ゆうべつ	DE-228	Hitachi Zosen, Maizuru, Kyoto	14 January 1982	25 January 1983	14 February 1984	Decommissioned 25 June 2010, struck May 2012, scrapped

==== Abukuma class (DE)— 6 ships ====
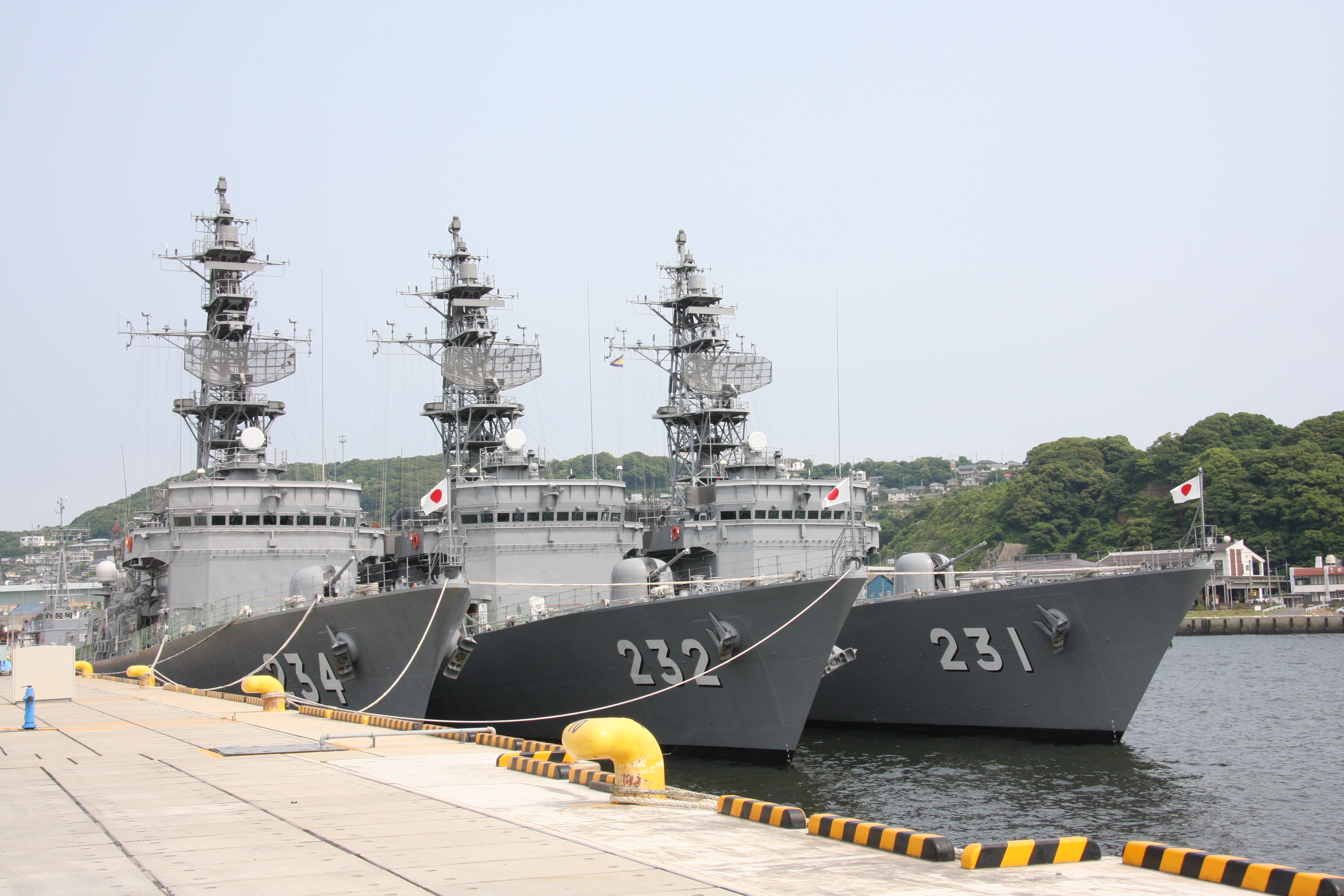
Abukuma-class, Japan current class of small escorts

Name	Kana	Hull no.	Builder	Laid down	Launched	Completed	Fate
Abukuma	あぶくま	DE-229	Mitsui Engineering & Shipbuilding, Tamano, Okayama	17 March 1988	21 December 1988	12 December 1989	Homeport JMSDF Kure Naval Base
Jintsū	じんつう	DE-230	Hitachi Zosen, Maizuru, Kyoto	14 April 1988	31 January 1989	28 February 1990	Homeport JMSDF Sasebo Naval Base
Ōyodo	おおよど	DE-231	Hitachi Zosen, Osaka	8 March 1989	19 December 1989	23 January 1991	Homeport JMSDF Ōminato Naval Base
Sendai	せんだい	DE-232	Sumitomo, Uraga, Yokosuka	14 April 1989	26 January 1990	15 March 1991	Homeport JMSDF Maizuru Naval Base
Tone	とね	DE-234	Sumitomo, Uraga, Yokosuka	8 February 1991	6 December 1991	8 February 1993	Homeport JMSDF Sasebo Naval Base
Chikuma	ちくま	DE-233	Hitachi Zosen, Osaka	14 February 1991	25 January 1992	24 February 1993	Homeport JMSDF Ōminato Naval Base

==== Mogami class (FFM)— 6 ships ====
(7 ships completed, 3 ships are under construction, 2 more ordered and with plan to construct a total of 12 ships)

Name	Kana	Hull no.	Builder	Laid down	Launched	Completed	Fate
JS Kumano	くまの	FFM-2	Mitsui Engineering & Shipbuilding, Tamano, Okayama	30 October 2019	19 November 2020	22 March 2022	Homeport JMSDF Yokosuka Naval Base
JS Mogami	もがみ	FFM-1	Mitsubishi Shipyard, Nagasaki	29 October 2019	3 March 2021	28 April 2022	Homeport JMSDF Yokosuka Naval Base
JS Noshiro	のしろ	FFM-3	Mitsubishi Shipyard, Nagasaki	15 July 2020	22 June 2021	15 Dec 2022	
JS Mikuma	みくま	FFM-4	Mitsubishi Shipyard, Nagasaki	15 July 2020	10 Dec 2021	7 March 2023	
JS Yahagi	やはぎ	FFM-5	Mitsubishi Shipyard, Nagasaki	24 June 2021	23 June 2022	21 May 2024	
JS Agano	あがの	FFM-6	Mitsubishi Shipyard, Nagasaki	24 June 2021	21 Dec 2022	20 June 2024	
JS Niyodo	によど	FFM-7	Mitsubishi Shipyard, Nagasaki	30 June 2022	26 Sep 2023		
JS Yūbetsu	ゆうべつ	FFM-8	Mitsui Engineering & Shipbuilding, Tamano, Okayama	30 August 2022	14 Nov 2023		
JS Natori	なとり	FFM-9	Mitsubishi Shipyard, Nagasaki	6 July 2023	24 June 2024		
JS Nagara	ながら	FFM-10	Mitsubishi Shipyard, Nagasaki	6 July 2023	19 Dec 2024		
