= Japanese destroyer Makinami =

Three warships of Japan have been named Makinami (巻波), meaning "Overflowing Waves" (Rolling Wave):

- Japanese destroyer Makinami (1941) a Yugumo-class destroyer launched in 1941 and sunk in 1943
- JDS Makinami an Ayanami-class destroyer launched in 1960 and decommissioned in 1990
- JS Makinami (DD-112) a Takanami-class destroyer launched in 2002
