= Japanese ship Ayanami =

Three Japanese ships have been named Ayanami:

- Japanese destroyer Ayanami (1909), a Kamikaze-class destroyer of the Imperial Japanese Navy during World War I
- Japanese destroyer Ayanami (1929), a Fubuki-class destroyer of the Imperial Japanese Navy during World War II
- JDS Ayanami (DD-103), lead ship of the Ayanami-class destroyers
