= Ayanami =

Ayanami, meaning "twilled waves" in Japanese, may refer to:

- Japanese destroyer Ayanami, the name of 3 ships
- Rei Ayanami, a fictional character from the Japanese media franchise Neon Genesis Evangelion
- Ayanami, a fictional character from the Japanese fantasy manga 07-Ghost
