= JDS Ayanami =

Ayanami-class destroyer

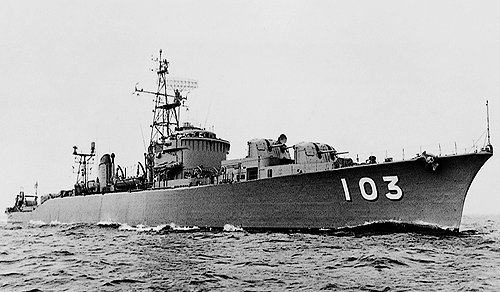
- JDS Ayanami

History

Japan
- Name: Ayanami; (あやなみ)
- Namesake: Ayanami (1929)
- Ordered: 1955
- Builder: Mitsubishi, Nagasaki
- Laid down: 20 November 1956
- Launched: 1 June 1957
- Commissioned: 12 February 1958
- Decommissioned: 25 December 1986
- Reclassified: ASU-7004
- Home port: Kure
- Identification: Pennant number: DD-103
- Fate: Scrapped

General characteristics
- Class & type: Ayanami-class destroyer
- Displacement: 1,720 t (1,690 long tons) standard; 2,500 t (2,500 long tons) full load
- Length: 109 m (358 ft)
- Beam: 10.7 m (35 ft)
- Depth: 8.1 m (26 ft 7 in)
- Complement: 220
- Armament: 6 × 3"/50 caliber Mk.22 guns; 4 × 533 mm (21 in) torpedo tubes; 2 × ASW torpedo racks; 2 × Hedgehog anti-submarine mortars; 2 × DCT (K-guns)

JDS Ayanami (DD-103) was the lead ship of Ayanami-class destroyers.

== Construction and career ==
Ayanami was laid down at Mitsubishi Heavy Industries Nagasaki Shipyard on 20 November 1956 and launched on 1 June 1957. She was commissioned on 12 February 1958.

On 16 March 1958, she was transferred to the 8th Escort Corps, which was newly formed under the control of the Yokosuka District Force, together with JDS Uranami. Since August of the same year, she has participated in the second Maritime Self-Defense Force practicing voyage.

She also participated in the 5th practicing voyage in 1961 and the 12th pelagic practice voyage in 1968.

On 25 October 1958, the 8th Escort Corps was reorganized under the 1st Escort Corps group.

On 1 April 1959, she was transferred to the 9th Escort Corps, which was newly formed under the 1st Escort Corps group, together with JDS Uranami.

During the special repair work from 1962 to 1963, the equipment was modernized, and the unequipped radio wave detector (ESM) NORL-1 was put in the back. Replaced equipment and search sonar with OQS-12 and attack sonar with OQY-2.

In July 1965, two depth charge projectors on the rear deck and two depth charge drop rails were removed, and equipped with Variable Depth Sonar (VDS) OQA-1.

On 15 March 1969, the 9th Escort Corps was reorganized under the 3rd Escort Corps group.

In 1970, the short torpedo launcher was removed, and work was carried out to strengthen the anti-submarine attack capability with two 68-type triple short torpedo launchers.

On 1 February 1971, the 9th Escort Corps was reorganized under the 4th Escort Corps, which was newly formed under the escort fleet.

On 19 October 1979, the Norwegian cargo ship Berge Oder moved northward in Tokyo Bay while typhoon No. 20 was evacuating off Kisarazu, about 16 km north of Futtsu Misaki. She broke two meters wide and ten meters long two meters above the waterline on the side, but her crew was not damaged and returned to Yokosuka base on her own.

On 30 March 1983, she was changed to a special service ship and her ship registration number was changed to ASU-7004. She was transferred to the Kure District Force as a ship under direct control and her fixed port was transferred to Kure. In addition, she removed the 4-unit long torpedo launcher and VDS during the renovation work to the special service ship.

Removed from the register on 25 December 1986. In her 28-year history, she has sailed 600,000 nautical miles, equivalent to 28 laps of the globe.

== Gallery ==
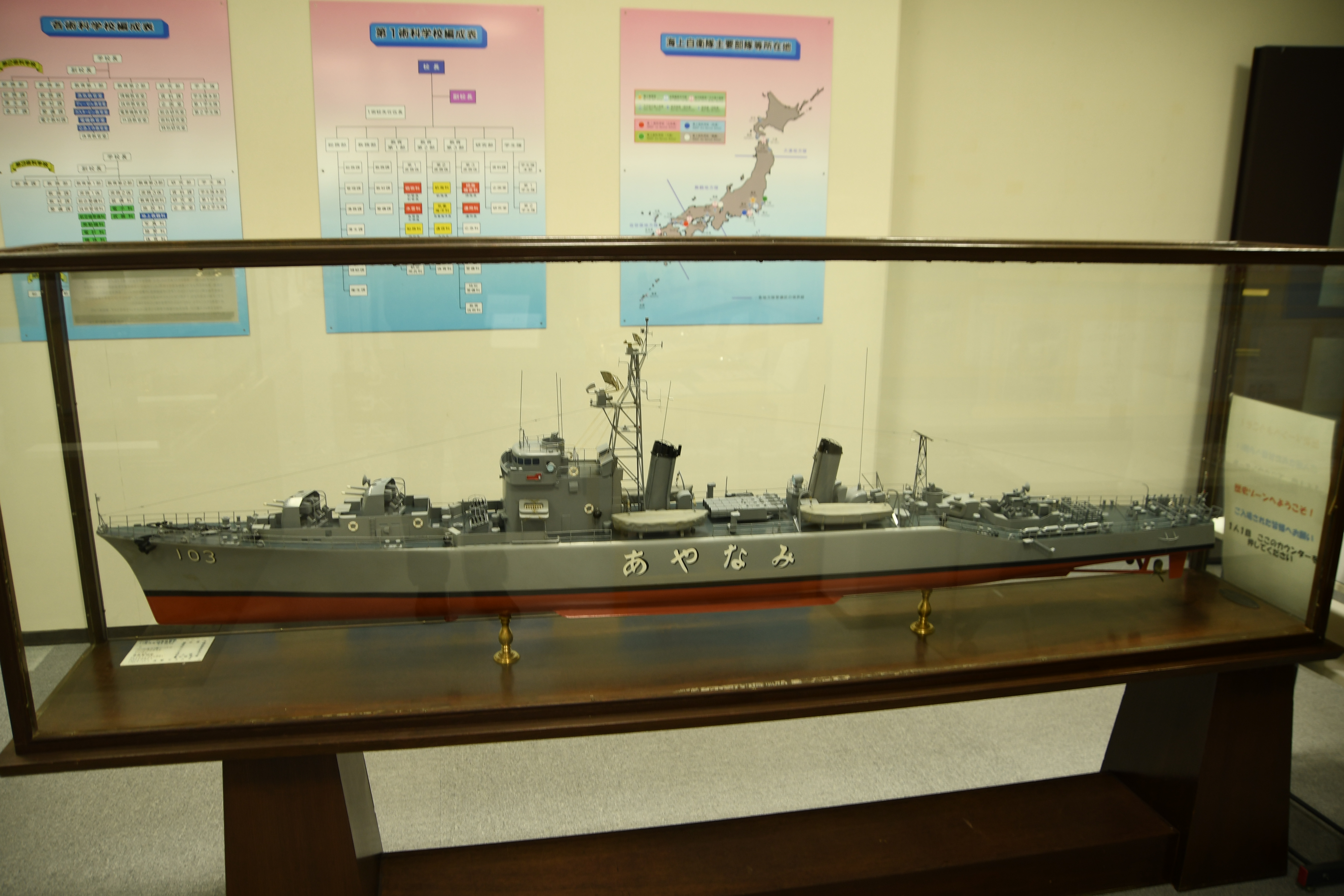
JDS Ayanami model

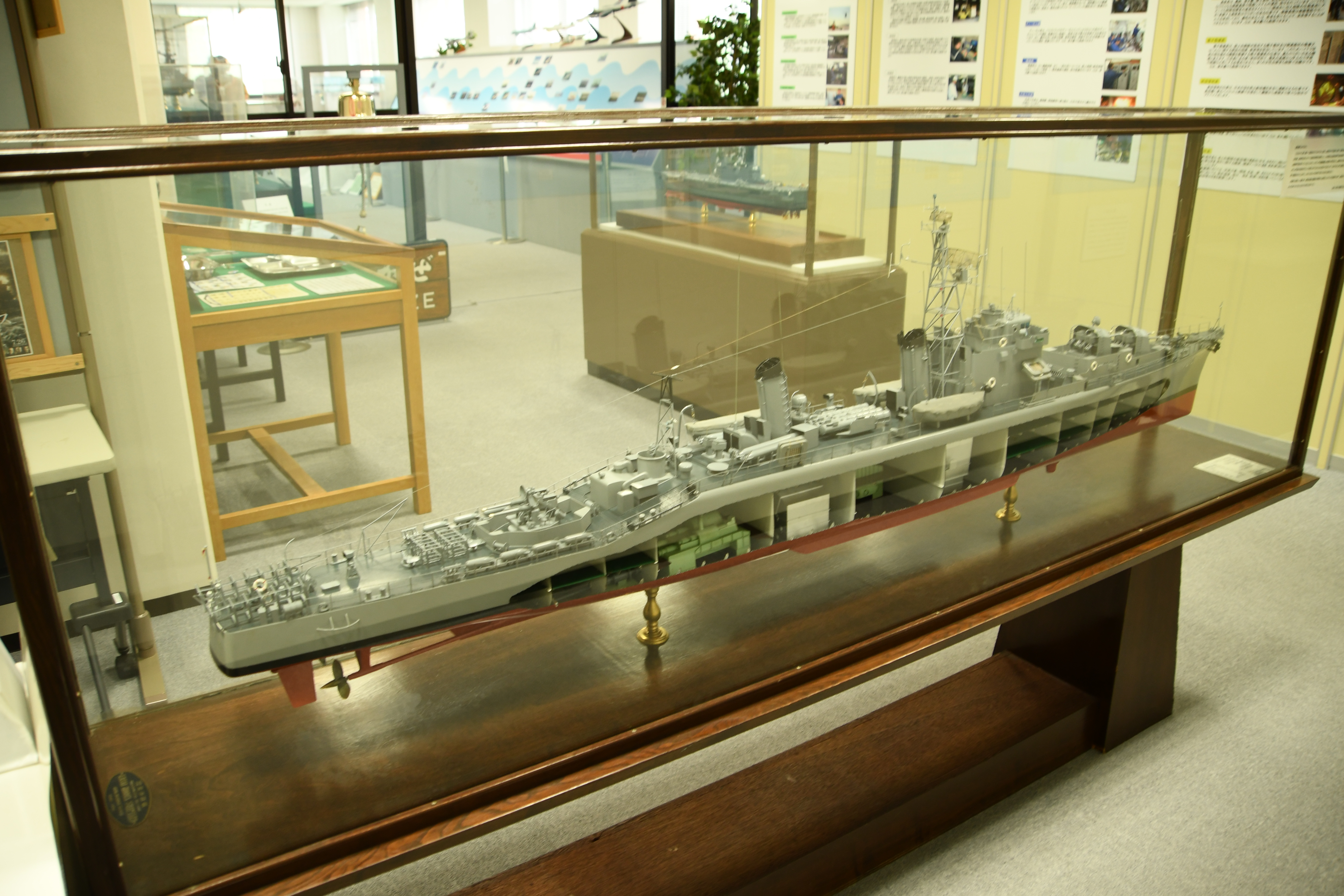
JDS Ayanami model
