= JDS Uranami =

Destroyer of the Japan Maritime Self-Defense Force

- Uranami as seen on 28 October 1965.

History

Japan
- Name: Uranami; (うらなみ)
- Ordered: 1955
- Builder: Kawasaki Heavy Industries
- Laid down: 1 February 1957
- Launched: 29 August 1957
- Commissioned: 27 February 1958
- Recommissioned: 30 March 1983 (as an auxiliary vessel)
- Decommissioned: 25 December 1986
- Reclassified: 30 March 1983 (as an auxiliary vessel)
- Home port: Yokosuka

General characteristics
- Class & type: Ayanami-class destroyer
- Displacement: 1,720 t (1,690 long tons) standard; 2,500 t (2,500 long tons) full load
- Length: 109 m (357 ft 7 in)
- Beam: 10.7 m (35 ft 1 in)
- Depth: 8.1 m (26 ft 7 in)
- Complement: 220
- Armament: 6 × 3"/50 caliber Mk.22 guns; 4 × 533 mm (21 in) torpedo tubes; 2 × ASW torpedo racks; 2 × Hedgehog anti-submarine mortars; 2 × DCT (K-guns)

Uranami (浦波, "Shore Wave") was the third of seven Ayanami-class destroyers, built for the Japanese Maritime Self-Defence Force (JMSDF) following World War II. The ship was the third destroyer of to be named so, following the World War I-era Kamikaze-class Uranami (1907), and the World War II-era Fubuki-class Uranami (1928).

== Operational history ==
Ordered in 1955, the 1,720-ton destroyer escort Uranami was built by Kawasaki Heavy Industries in Kobe. She was laid down on 1 February 1957, launched on 29 August 1957 and commissioned on 30 March 1958. Following her commissioning, the ship was assigned to the JMSDF fleet in Yokosuka. She was given the hull designation DD-105.

On 16 March 1958 Uranami was attached to the 8th Escort Division, and then subsequently to the 8th Division of the 1st Escort Flotilla on 25 October 1958. In 1969, the destroyer transferred to the 9th Division of the 1st Escort Flotilla 1 April, and the 9th Division of the 3rd Escort Flotilla on 15 March 1969, then finally the 9th Division of the 4th Escort Flotilla on 1 February 1971. When the 9th Division was disbanded on 30 March 1983, Uranami was reclassified as an auxiliary vessel, and reassigned hull designation ASU-7005.

In 1962 Uranami had her sonar upgraded. In 1963 her radar was likewise exchanged. In 1971 the ship's anti-submarine armament was retrofit.

Uranami was finally decommissioned on 25 December 1986.
