= JDS Makinami =

Ayanami-class destroyer

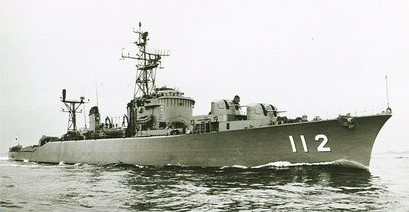
- JDS Makinami

History

Japan
- Name: Makinami; (まきなみ)
- Namesake: Makinami (1941)
- Ordered: 1958
- Builder: Hitachi, Maizuru
- Laid down: 20 March 1959
- Launched: 25 April 1960
- Commissioned: 28 October 1960
- Decommissioned: 1 March 1990
- Reclassified: ASU-7014
- Home port: Sasebo
- Identification: Pennant number: DD-112
- Fate: Scrapped

General characteristics
- Class & type: Ayanami-class destroyer
- Displacement: 1,720 t (1,690 long tons) standard; 2,500 t (2,500 long tons) full load
- Length: 109 m (358 ft)
- Beam: 10.7 m (35 ft)
- Depth: 8.1 m (26 ft 7 in)
- Complement: 220
- Armament: 6 × 3"/50 caliber Mk.22 guns; 4 × 533 mm (21 in) torpedo tubes; 2 × ASW torpedo racks; 2 × Hedgehog anti-submarine mortars; 2 × DCT (K-guns)

JDS Makinami (DD-112) was the seventh ship of Ayanami-class destroyers.

== Construction and career ==
Makinami was laid down at Hitachi Zosen Corporation Maizuru Shipyard on 20 March 1959 and launched on 25 April 1960. She's commissioned on 28 October 1960. She was transferred to the 11th Kure District Force.

On 1 February 1961, the 11th Escort Corps was reorganized under the Self-Defense Fleet and under the 2nd Escort Group.

On 1 February 1971, the 11th Escort Squadron was reorganized into the 4th Escort Squadron, which was newly formed under the escort fleet.

On 16 December 1973, the 11th Escort Corps was reorganized under the 3rd Escort Corps group, and the home port was transferred to Sasebo. In the same year, the short torpedo launcher was removed, and work was carried out to strengthen the anti-submarine attack capability, equipped with two 68-type triple short torpedo launchers.

On 1 December 1977, the 11th Escort Corps was reorganized under the Sasebo District Force.

On 20 February 1987, the 11th Escort Corps was abolished, the type was changed to a special service ship, and the ship registration number was changed to ASU-7014. She was transferred to the Sasebo District Force as a ship under direct control.

She was removed on 23 March 1990.
