= Ayanami-class destroyer =

1957 class of Japanese destroyers

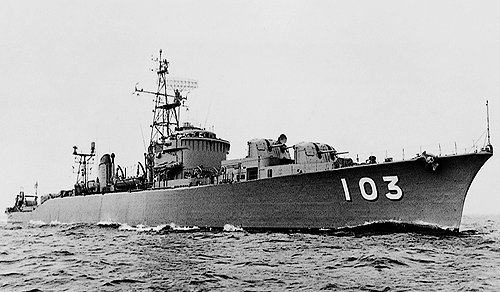
- Ayanami class member Ayanami

Class overview
- Name: Ayanami class
- Builders: Hitachi Zosen (1); Ishikawajima Heavy Industries (1); Kawasaki Dockyard Co. (1); Mitsubishi Shipbuilding & Eng.; Nagasaki Shipyard (1); Kobe Shipyard (1); Mitsui Shipbuilding & Eng. (2)
- Operators: Japan Maritime Self-Defense Force
- Preceded by: Harukaze class
- Succeeded by: Murasame class
- Built: 1956–1960
- In commission: 1958–1990
- Completed: 7
- Retired: 7

General characteristics
- Type: Destroyer
- Displacement: 1,720 t (1,690 long tons) standard; 2,500 t (2,500 long tons) full load
- Length: 109 m (358 ft)
- Beam: 10.7 m (35 ft)
- Depth: 8.1 m (26 ft 7 in)
- Complement: 220
- Sensors & processing systems: AN/SPS-12 air-search radar; OPS-5 surface-search radar; AN/SPS-11A; OQA-1 variable depth sonar; Mark 63 fire-control system
- Electronic warfare & decoys: NOLR-1
- Armament: 6 × 3"/50 caliber Mk.22 guns; 4 × 533 mm (21 in) torpedo tubes; 2 × ASW torpedo racks; 2 × Hedgehog anti-submarine mortars; 2 × DCT (K-guns)

The Ayanami class was a destroyer class built for the Japan Maritime Self-Defense Force (JMSDF) in the late 1950s. The primary purpose was anti-submarine warfare, so this class was classified as "DDK" (hunter-killer anti-submarine destroyer) unofficially.

== Design ==
This class adopted a "long forecastle" design with inclined afterdeck called "Holland Slope", named after the scenic sloping street in Nagasaki City. Their steam turbine propulsion systems were similar to the ones of the Harukaze class, but they varied between each ship in the class as part of the JMSDF's attempt to find the best propulsion system for its future surface combatants.

The Ayanami class were the first JMSDF vessels equipped with six 3-inch/50 caliber Mark 22 guns with Mark 33 dual mounts and Mark 32 lightweight torpedoes with two Mark 2 over-the-side launchers. 3-inch guns were controlled by two Mark 63 GFCSs.

All seven vessels names had previously been borne by ships of the World War II-era Fubuki and Yūgumo-class destroyer classes.

Ships in the class
Pennant no.	Name	Builder	Laid down	Launched	Commissioned	Decommissioned
DD-103/ASU-7004	Ayanami	Mitsubishi Zosen, Nagasaki	20 November 1956	1 June 1957	12 February 1958	25 December 1986
DD-104/TV-3502	Isonami	Shin-Mitsubishi, Kobe	14 December 1956	30 September 1957	14 March 1958	1 July 1987
DD-105/ASU-7005	Uranami	Kawasaki, Tokyo	1 February 1957	29 August 1957	27 February 1958	25 December 1986
DD-106/TV-3503	Shikinami	Mitsui Zosen, Tamano	14 December 1956	25 September 1957	15 March 1958	1 July 1987
DD-110/ASU-7009	Takanami	Mitsui Zosen, Tamano	8 November 1958	8 August 1959	30 January 1960	1 March 1989
DD-111/ASU-7013	Ōnami or Oonami	Ishikawajima HI, Kobe	20 March 1959	13 February 1960	29 August 1960	1 March 1990
DD-112/ASU-7014	Makinami	Iono HI, Maizuru	20 March 1959	25 April 1960	28 October 1960	1 March 1990

== See also ==
- List of destroyers of Japan

Equivalent destroyers of the same era

- Skory class
- Holland class
- Östergötland class
- Zerstörer 1 class
- Artigliere class
