= JDS Asakaze (DDG-169) =

Tachikaze-class guided missile destroyer

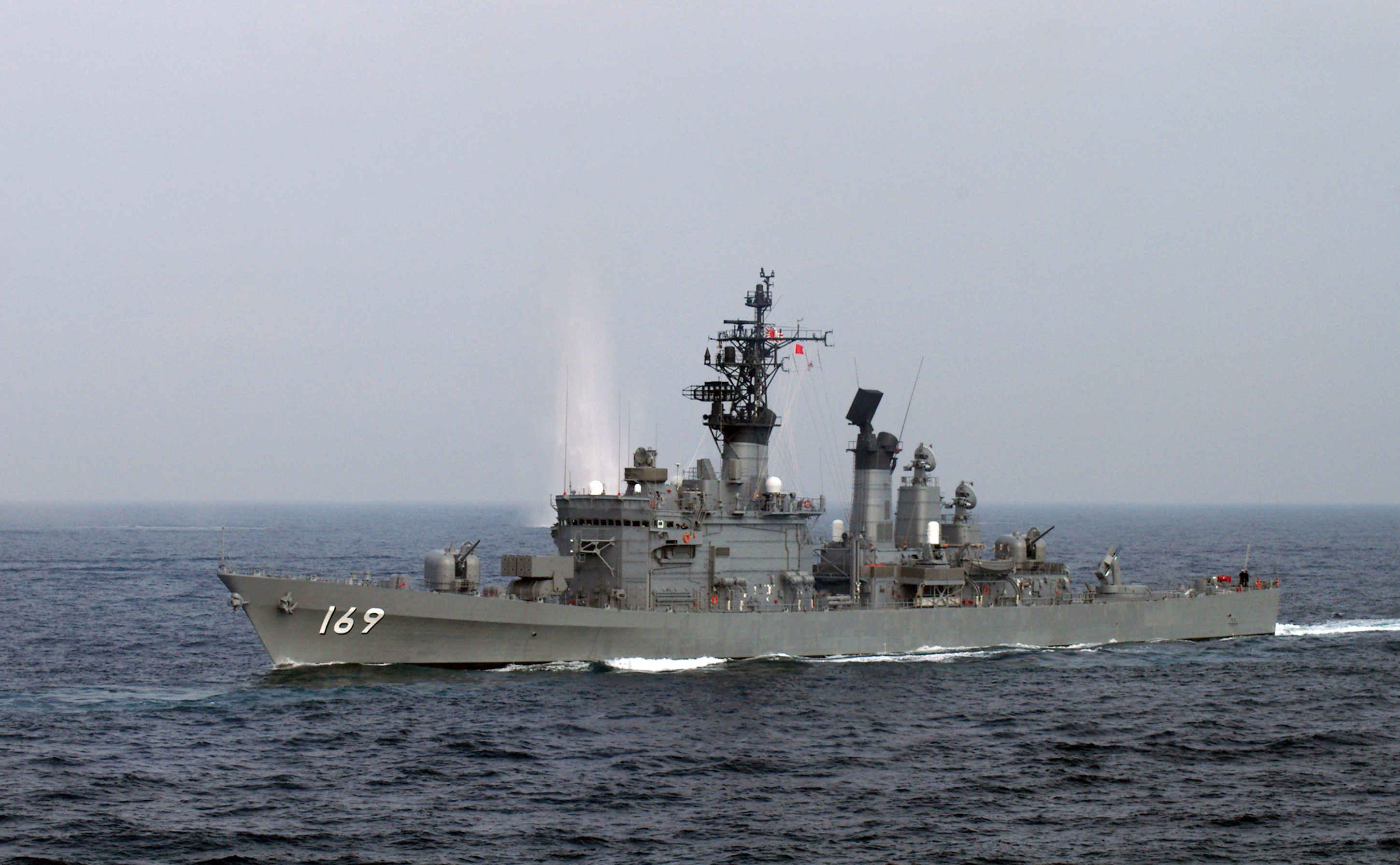
- JS Asakaze underway during Fleet Review 2006.

History

Japan
- Name: Asakaze; (あさかぜ)
- Namesake: Asakaze (1922)
- Builder: Mitsubishi, Nagasaki
- Laid down: 27 May 1976
- Launched: 15 October 1977
- Commissioned: 27 March 1979
- Decommissioned: 12 March 2008
- Home port: Sasebo (1976-1995); Yokosuka (1995-2008)
- Identification: Pennant number: DDG-169
- Fate: Scrapped

General characteristics
- Type: Tachikaze-class destroyer
- Displacement: 3,850 long tons (3,910 t) standard; 3,950 long tons (4,010 t) (DDG170)
- Length: 143 m (469 ft 2 in)
- Beam: 14.3 m (46 ft 11 in)
- Draft: 4.6 m (15 ft 1 in); 4.7 m (15 ft 5 in) (DDG170)
- Propulsion: 2 × Mitsubishi steam turbines, 60,000 hp (45,000 kW); 2 shafts
- Speed: 32 knots (37 mph; 59 km/h)
- Complement: 250; 230 (DDG168); 255 (DDG170)
- Armament: 2 × 5"/54 caliber Mark 42 gun (DDG168 ×1); 2 × 20 mm Phalanx CIWS; 1 × Mk 13 missile launcher (for the Standard-MR SAM); 8 × Boeing Harpoon SSM; 1 × Type 74 launcher for the ASROC; 2 × HOS-301 triple 324 mm (12.8 in) torpedo tubes

JDS Asakaze (DDG-169) is the second ship of the Tachikaze-class destroyer built for the Japan Maritime Self-Defense Force (JMSDF).

== Development ==
The Tachikaze-class destroyers were designed almost exclusively as anti-aircraft platforms. No helicopter facilities are provided, and the ASW armament is confined to ASROC missiles and Mk 46 torpedoes. In order to save on construction costs the class adopted the propulsion plant and machinery of the Haruna-class destroyers.

== Construction and career ==
She was laid down on the 27 May 1976 in Mitsubishi shipyard in Nagasaki. She was launched on 15 October 1977, and commissioned on 27 March 1979. She was decommissioned on 12 March 2008.

Participated in the Exercise RIMPAC 1982.

From November 2 to December 2, 1982, she participated in the Hawaii dispatch training with the escort vessels JDS Haruna, JDS Shirane and eight P-2Js.

Participated in the Exercise RIMPAC 1984.

From April 25 to July 13, 1985, participated in the US dispatch training with the escort vessels Shirane and Sawakaze.

Participated in the Exercise RIMPAC 1988.

From June 27 to August 28, 1991, participated in the US dispatch training with the escort vessels Kurama and Setogiri.

On March 16, 1995, the 64th Escort Corps was newly formed under the 4th Escort Corps group and was incorporated with JDS Tachikaze.

On March 20, 1998, the homeport was transferred to Sasebo.

On July 1, 2002, based on the Act on Special Measures Against Terrorism, he was dispatched to the Indian Ocean with the escort ship Inazuma and returned to Japan on October 29, 2002.

Asakaze succeeded JDS Tachikaze in the flagship role after her decommissioning in 2008.

In October 2009, dismantling was completed at Imari Port. In March 2010, dismantling was completed.

== Gallery ==
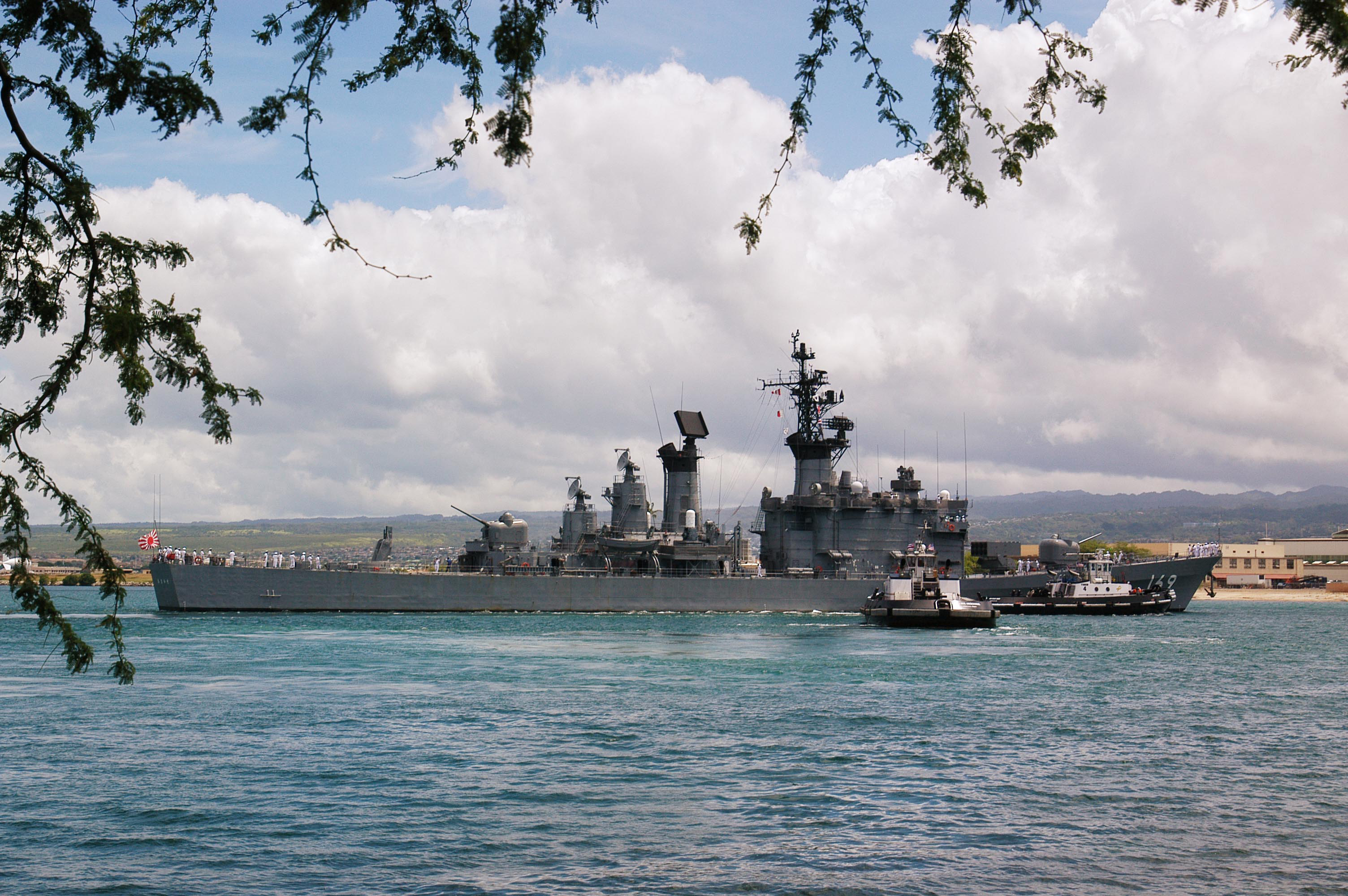
Asakaze entering Pearl Harbor on 19 June 2006.

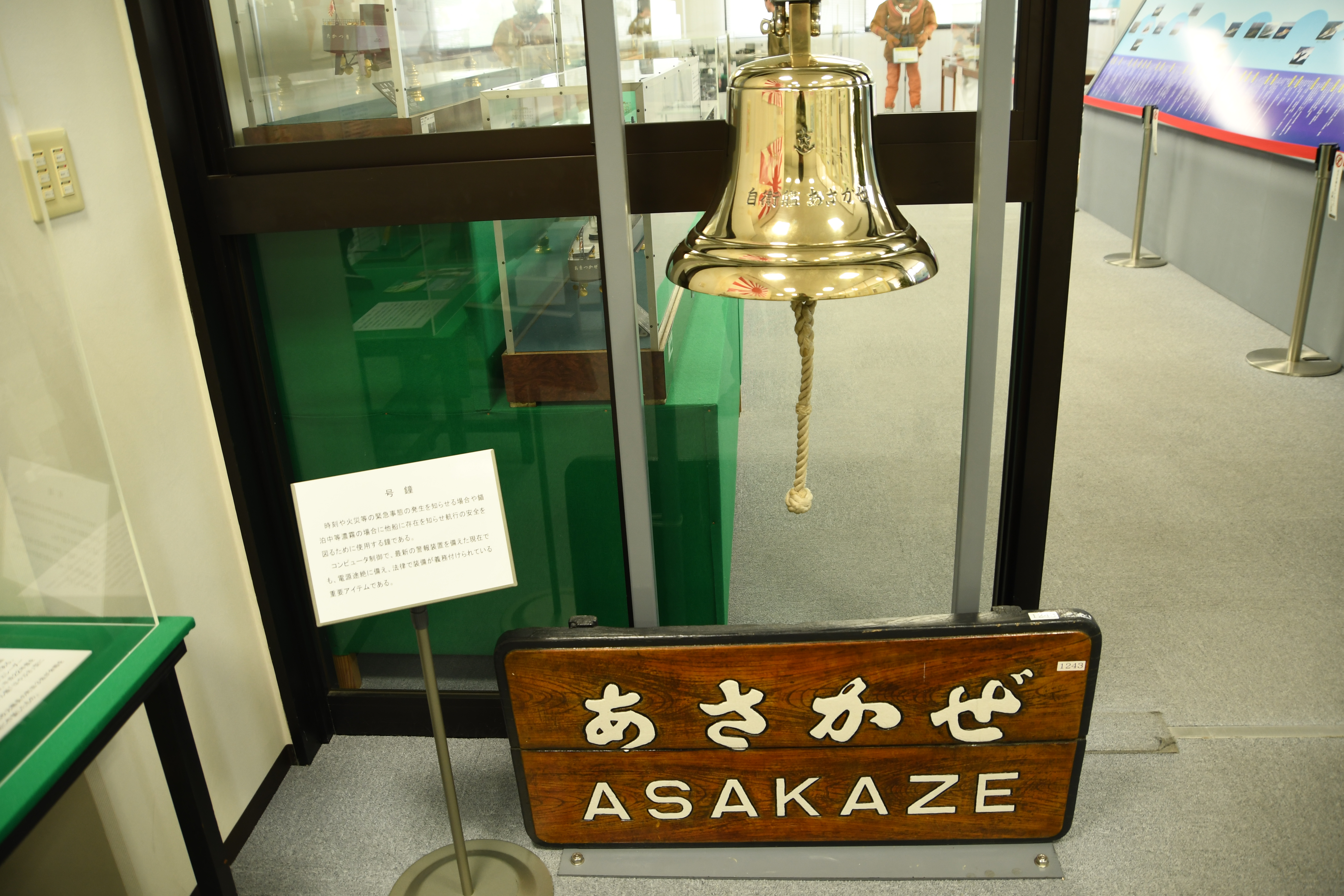
Asakaze's signal bell on display In JMSDF 1st Service School
