= Japanese destroyer Sawakaze =

Two Japanese destroyers have been named Sawakaze :

- Japanese destroyer Sawakaze (1919), a Minekaze-class destroyer launched in 1919 and scrapped in 1948
- JDS Sawakaze (DDG-170), a Tachikaze-class destroyer commissioned in 1983 and stricken in 2010
