= JDS Sawakaze =

Tachikaze-class guided missile destroyer

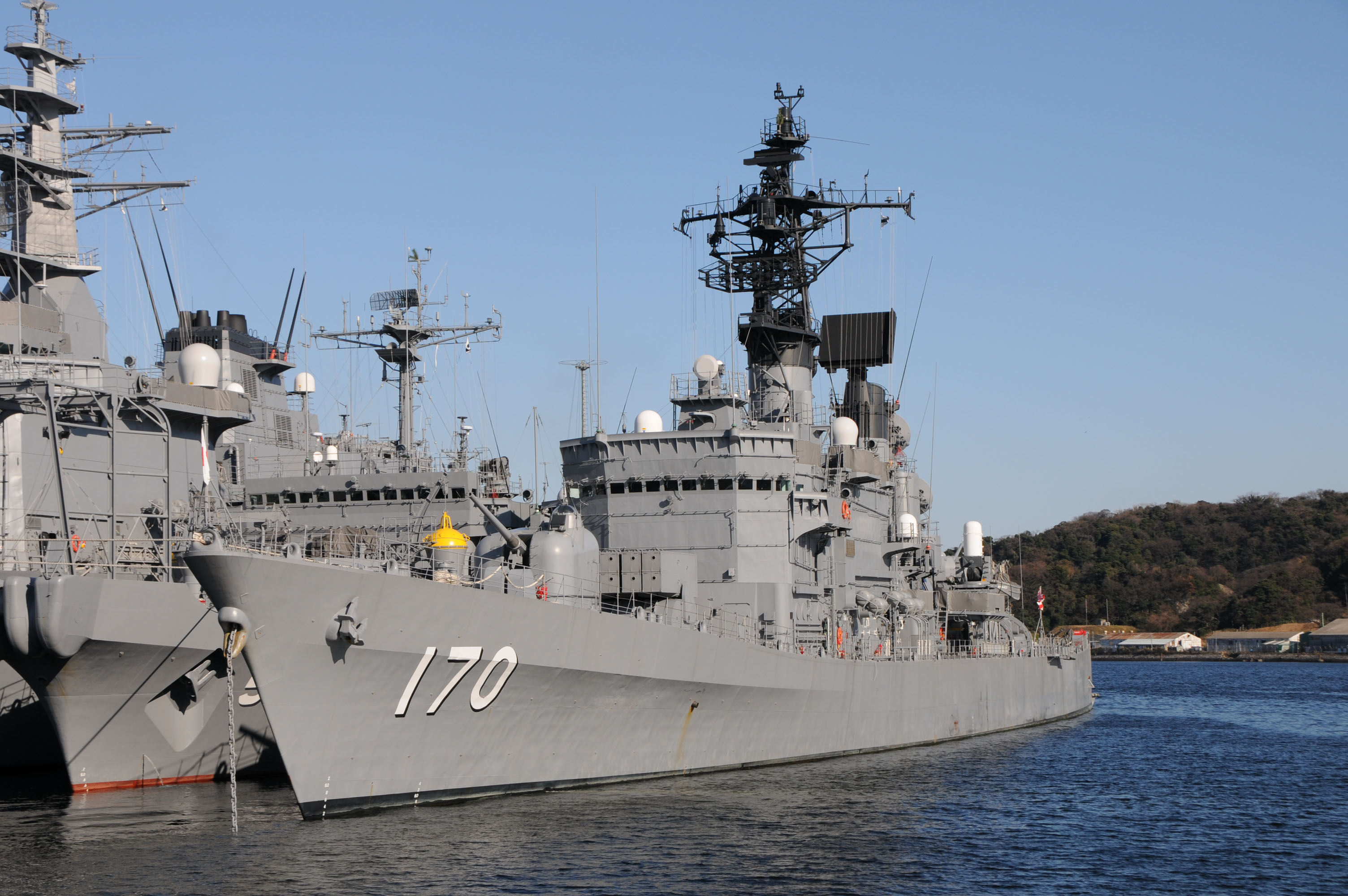
- JS Sawakaze in Yokosuka on 1 January 2009.

History

Japan
- Name: Sawakaze; (さわかぜ)
- Namesake: Sawakaze (1919)
- Builder: Mitsubishi, Nagasaki
- Laid down: 14 September 1979
- Launched: 4 June 1981
- Commissioned: 30 March 1983
- Decommissioned: 25 June 2010
- Home port: Sasebo (1976-1995); Yokosuka (1995-2008)
- Identification: Pennant number: DDG-170
- Fate: Scrapped, April 2011

General characteristics
- Type: Tachikaze-class destroyer
- Displacement: 3,850 long tons (3,910 t) standard; 3,950 long tons (4,010 t) (DDG170)
- Length: 143 m (469 ft 2 in)
- Beam: 14.3 m (46 ft 11 in)
- Draft: 4.6 m (15 ft 1 in); 4.7 m (15 ft 5 in) (DDG170)
- Propulsion: 2 × Mitsubishi steam turbines, 60,000 hp (45,000 kW); 2 shafts
- Speed: 32 knots (37 mph; 59 km/h)
- Complement: 250; 230 (DDG168); 255 (DDG170)
- Armament: 2 × 5"/54 caliber Mark 42 gun (DDG168 ×1); 2 × 20 mm Phalanx CIWS; 1 × Mk 13 missile launcher (for the Standard-MR SAM); 8 × Boeing Harpoon SSM; 1 × Type 74 launcher for the ASROC; 2 × HOS-301 triple 324 mm (12.8 in) torpedo tubes

JS Sawakaze (DDG-170) was the third ship of the Tachikaze-class destroyers built for the Japan Maritime Self-Defense Force (JMSDF).

== Development ==
The Tachikaze-class destroyers were designed almost exclusively as anti-aircraft platforms. No helicopter facilities are provided, and the ASW armament is confined to ASROC missiles and Mk 46 torpedoes. In order to save on construction costs the class adopted the propulsion plant and machinery of the Haruna-class destroyers.

== Construction and career ==
She was laid down on the 14 September 1979 in Mitsubishi shipyard in Nagasaki. She was launched on 4 June 1981, and commissioned on 30 March 1983.

She participated in the Exercise RIMPAC 1984.

From April 25 to July 13, 1985, she participated in the US dispatch training with the escort vessels Shirane and Asakaze.

She participated in the Exercise RIMPAC events in 1986, 1988, 1990 and 1992.

From June 15 to September 5, 1995, she participated in the US dispatch training with Haruna and three P-3C aircraft.

On February 13, 2002, based on the Act on Special Measures Against Terrorism, dispatched to the Indian Ocean along with Haruna and the supply ship Tokiwa. She was engaged in missions until June of the same year, and returned to Sasebo on July 5.

On March 15, 2007, she became a ship under the direct control of the escort fleet and the honeport was transferred to Yokosuka. She succeeded Tachikaze and assumed the role of the flagship of the 5th escort fleet, but was not modified in particular.

On June 25, 2010, she was decommissioned along with the escort ship Hatsuyuki to the Yokosuka District Chief, Sadayoshi Matsuoka, and retired. The total nautical mile was 691,913 nautical miles (about 1.28 million kilometers).

In April 2011, she was dismantled at Etajima.
