= Japanese ship Haruna =

At least two naval vessels of Japan have borne the name Haruna:

- Japanese battleship Haruna, a battleship of the Imperial Japanese Navy
- JDS Haruna, a Haruna-class destroyer of the Japan Maritime Self-Defense Force
