= Japanese destroyer Asakaze =

Four Japanese destroyers have been named Asakaze :

- Japanese destroyer Asakaze (1905), a Kamikaze-class destroyer launched in 1905 and scuttled in 1929
- Japanese destroyer Asakaze (1922), a Kamikaze-class destroyer launched in 1922 and sunk in 1944
- JDS Asakaze (DD-181), a Gleaves-class destroyer launched in 1941 as USS Ellyson she was acquired by Japan in 1954 and served until 1970
- JDS Asakaze (DDG-169), a Tachikaze-class destroyer commissioned in 1979 and stricken in 2008
