= Japanese destroyer Tachikaze =

Two Japanese destroyers have been named Tachikaze :

- Japanese destroyer Tachikaze (1921), a Minekaze-class destroyer launched in 1921 and sunk in 1944
- JDS Tachikaze (DDG-168), a Tachikaze-class destroyer commissioned in 1976 and stricken in 2007
