= JS Haruna =

Haruna-class helicopter destroyer

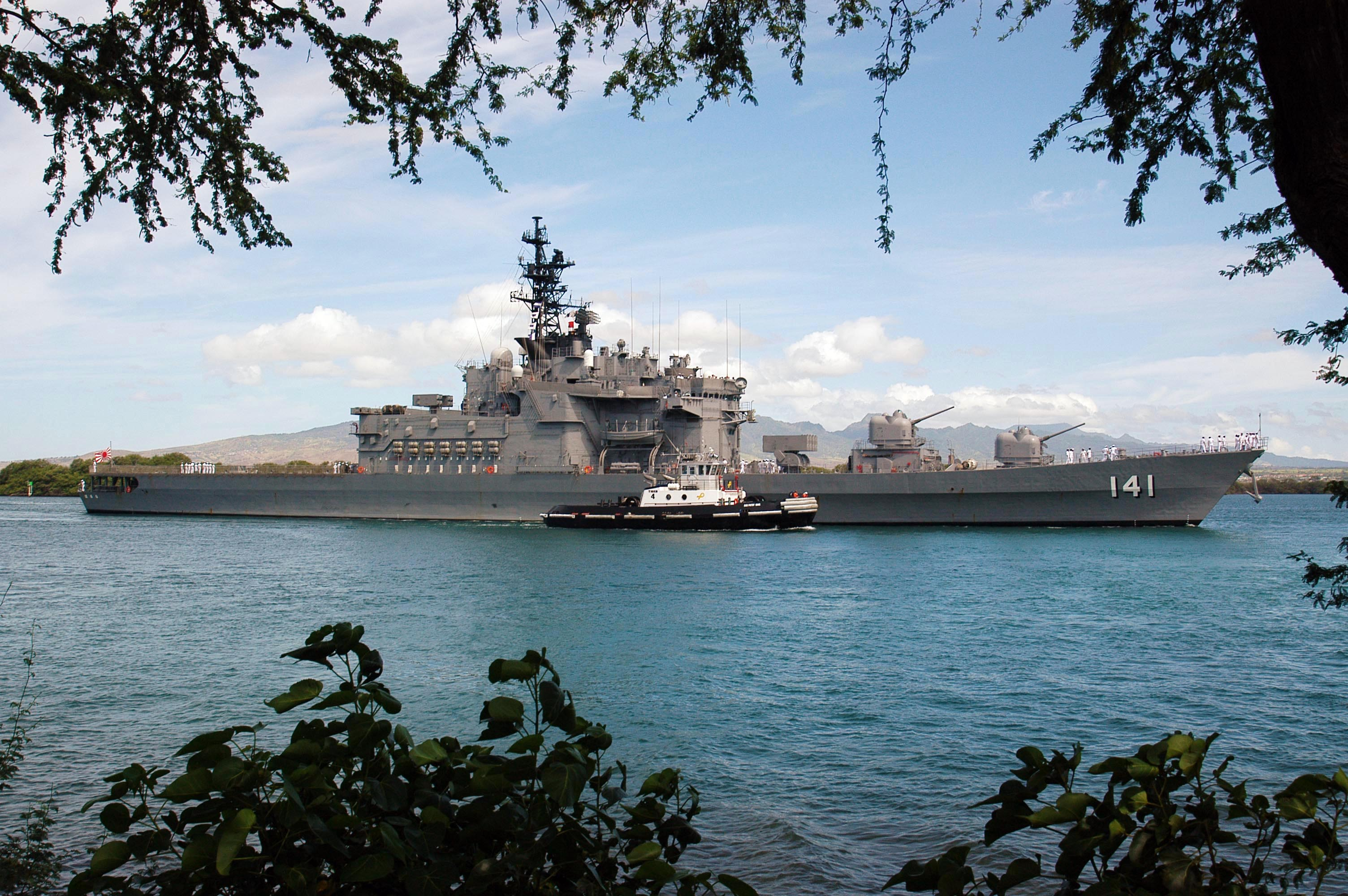
- Haruna in Pearl Harbor, Hawaii, seen in 2004

History

Japan
- Name: Haruna; (はるな)
- Ordered: 1968
- Builder: Mitsubishi Heavy Industries, Nagasaki Shipyard
- Laid down: 19 March 1970
- Launched: 1 February 1972
- Commissioned: 22 March 1973
- Decommissioned: 18 March 2009
- Refit: 31 March 1986
- Home port: Yokosuka (1973-1981); Sasebo (1981-1998); Maizuru (1998-2009)
- Identification: Pennant number: DDH-141
- Fate: Scrapped, January 2010

General characteristics
- Class & type: Haruna-class destroyer
- Displacement: 4,950 long tons (5,029 t) standard; 6,900 long tons (7,011 t) full load
- Length: 153.1 m (502 ft 4 in)
- Beam: 17.5 m (57 ft 5 in)
- Draught: 5.2 m (17 ft 1 in)
- Propulsion: 2 boilers 850 psi (60 kg/cm², 5.9 MPa), 430 °C; 2 turbines; 2 shafts; 60,000 hp (45,000 kW)
- Speed: 31 knots (57 km/h; 36 mph)
- Complement: 360 (36 officers)
- Armament: Sea Sparrow Mk 29 (Type 3A) SAM octuple launcher; ASROC octuple launcher; 2 × FMC 5"/54 caliber Mark 42 guns; 2 × 20 mm Phalanx CIWS; 2 × Mark 32 triple torpedo tubes (Mark 46 torpedoes)

JS Haruna (DDH-141) was the lead ship of the Haruna-class helicopter destroyer of the Japanese Maritime Self Defense Force (JMSDF).

== Overview ==
These ships were Japan's first helicopter-equipped destroyer (DDH), and could carry and operate three helicopters in spite of their 5000 t class. In terms of equipment, this class constituted the first JMSDF ships to be equipped with a fin stabilizer to stabilize its attitude during helicopter operation, and a landing restraint device (bear trap) was installed to improve the safety and efficiency of flight work on a swaying ship. Until the introduction of the Kongō-class destroyer (Aegis ship), this class (including the Shirane class) were the largest escort ships of the JMSDF.

== Construction and career ==
Haruna was laid down on 19 March 1970 and launched on 1 February 1972 by Mitsubishi Heavy Industries Nagasaki Shipyard. She was commissioned on 22 March 1973, into the 1st Escort Corps and deployed in Yokosuka.

She was dispatched in response to the Yuyo Maru No.10 Incident that occurred in Tokyo Bay on November 9, 1974. On November 26, she arrived at the incident site together with the escort vessels Takatsuki, Mochizuki, Narushio and Yukikaze. She was dispatched to Tokyo Bay and fired to sink the vessel from the 27th to the 28th. On November 27, the 51st Escort Corps was formed under the 1st Escort Corps, and was incorporated together with Hiei, when she was commissioned on the same day.

In July 1975, she participated in a joint anti-submarine warfare training with the US Navy along with Hiei, Akizuki, Makishio and Narushio, south of Honshu. From July 3 to August 17, 1978, she participated in Hawaii dispatch training with the Hiei, Kuroshio, and eight P-2J aircraft.

On March 27, 1981, the 52nd Escort Corps was formed under the 2nd Escort Corps, and was incorporated with Kurama, when she was commissioned on the same day. Home port was transferred to Sasebo. From November 2 to December 2, 1982, she participated in the Hawaii dispatch training with the escort vessels Shirane, Asakaze and eight P-2Js. On March 30, 1983, the 52nd Escort Corps was abolished and became a ship under the direct control of the 2nd Escort Corps.

On March 30, 1984, she was transferred to the 3rd Escort Group as their flagship. From March 31, 1986, FRAM repair started at Mitsubishi Heavy Industries Nagasaki Shipyard & Machinery Works. This refurbishment improved anti-submarine search capability, individual ship air defense capability, combat command / information processing capability, and electronic warfare capability, and extended the age of the ship by eight years. This FRAM repair work was completed on October 31, 1987, and returned to the flagship of the 3rd Escort Crops. From June 16 to September 6, 1989, she was dispatched to the United States with Shimakaze and Mineyuki and participated in the Japan-US joint exercise READIEX 89-4A. In 1990, participated in the Exercise RIMPAC 1990. From June 15 to September 5, 1995, she participated in the US dispatch training with Sawakaze and three P-3C aircraft. From June 9 to September 3, 1997, she participated in the US dispatch training with Hamagiri, Myōkō and five P-3C aircraft.

On March 20, 1998, her home port was transferred to Maizuru. On October 13, the same year, she participated in the International Fleet Review to commemorate the 50th anniversary of the founding of Korea in Busan, South Korea, along with Setogiri and Myōkō. On February 18, 1999, during a firing circuit test of a high-performance 20mm machine gun (CIWS) while berthed at Maizuru Port, two live ammunition were fired accidentally and landed near Mt. Aoba, east of the port. On March 24, the same year, in the case of a suspicious ship off the Noto Peninsula, the first "maritime security action" was announced, and it was dispatched with Myōkō and Abukuma to fire warning shots at the suspicious ship.

On February 12, 2002, based on the Act on Special Measures Against Terrorism, dispatched to the Indian Ocean along with Sawakaze and Tokiwa. She was on duty until June of the same year and returned to Japan on August 7. On July 15, 2003, she was dispatched to the Indian Ocean along with the escort ship (at that time) Asagiri and Towada. She was on duty until October of the same year and returned to Japan on November 19.

In 2004, she participated in the Exercise RIMPAC 2004.

On August 21, 2007, she made a goodwill visit to the Russian Pacific Fleet base in Vladivostok. The arrival press conference was held in the Golden Horn. On March 26, 2008, the escort corps was reorganized and transferred to the 3rd Escort Corps. In the same year, participated in the Exercise RIMPAC 2008.

Removed from the register on March 18, 2009. The total cruising range was 959,652.1 miles (48 laps of the earth, equivalent to 2.3 round trips per month), the total number of helicopter landings were 55,013, and the total number of flights were 21,927 hours.

In October 2009, she set off to a dismantling company located in Etajima, and was completed dismantled in January 2010.

== Gallery ==
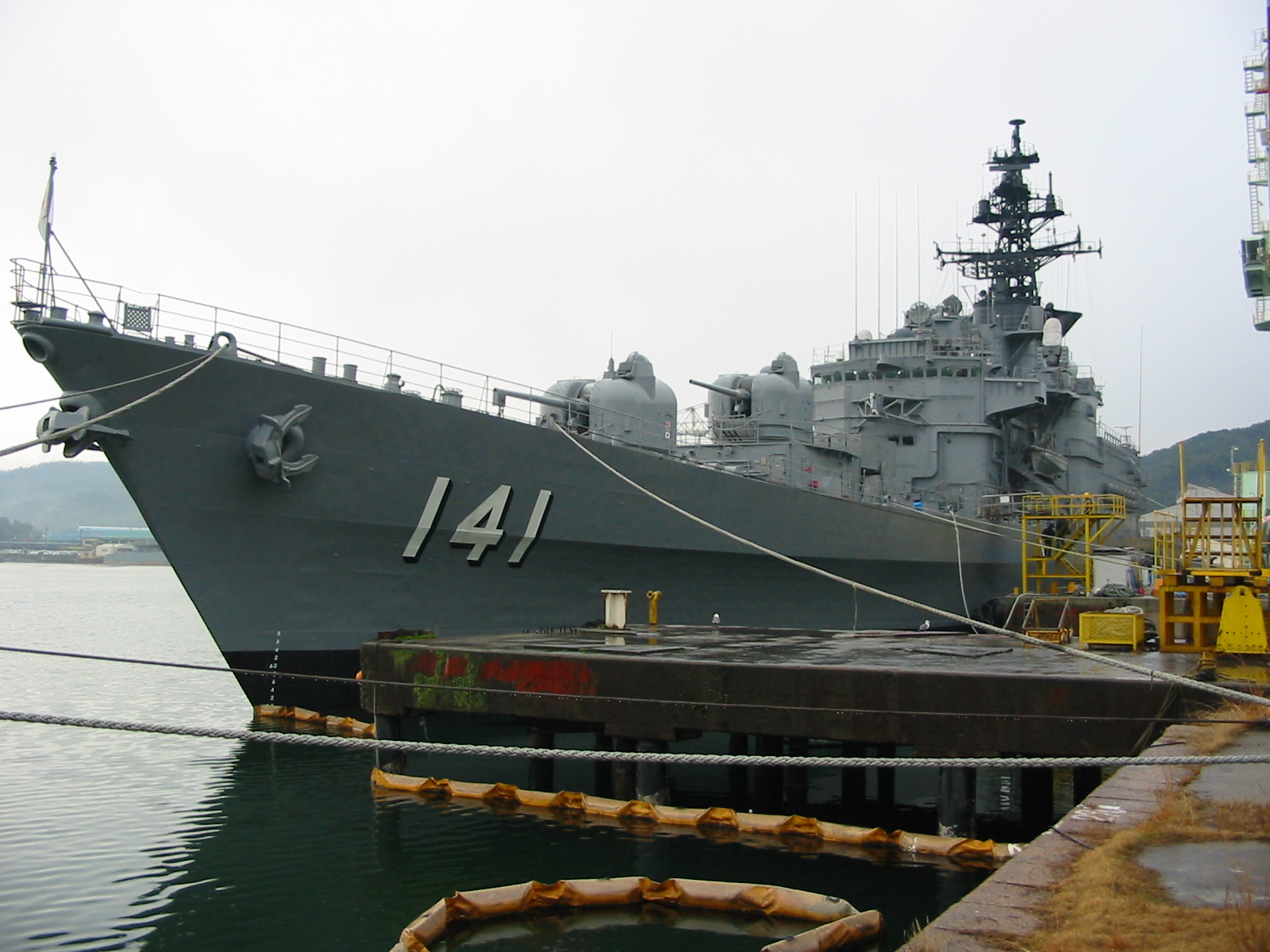
Haruna on 11 January 2003

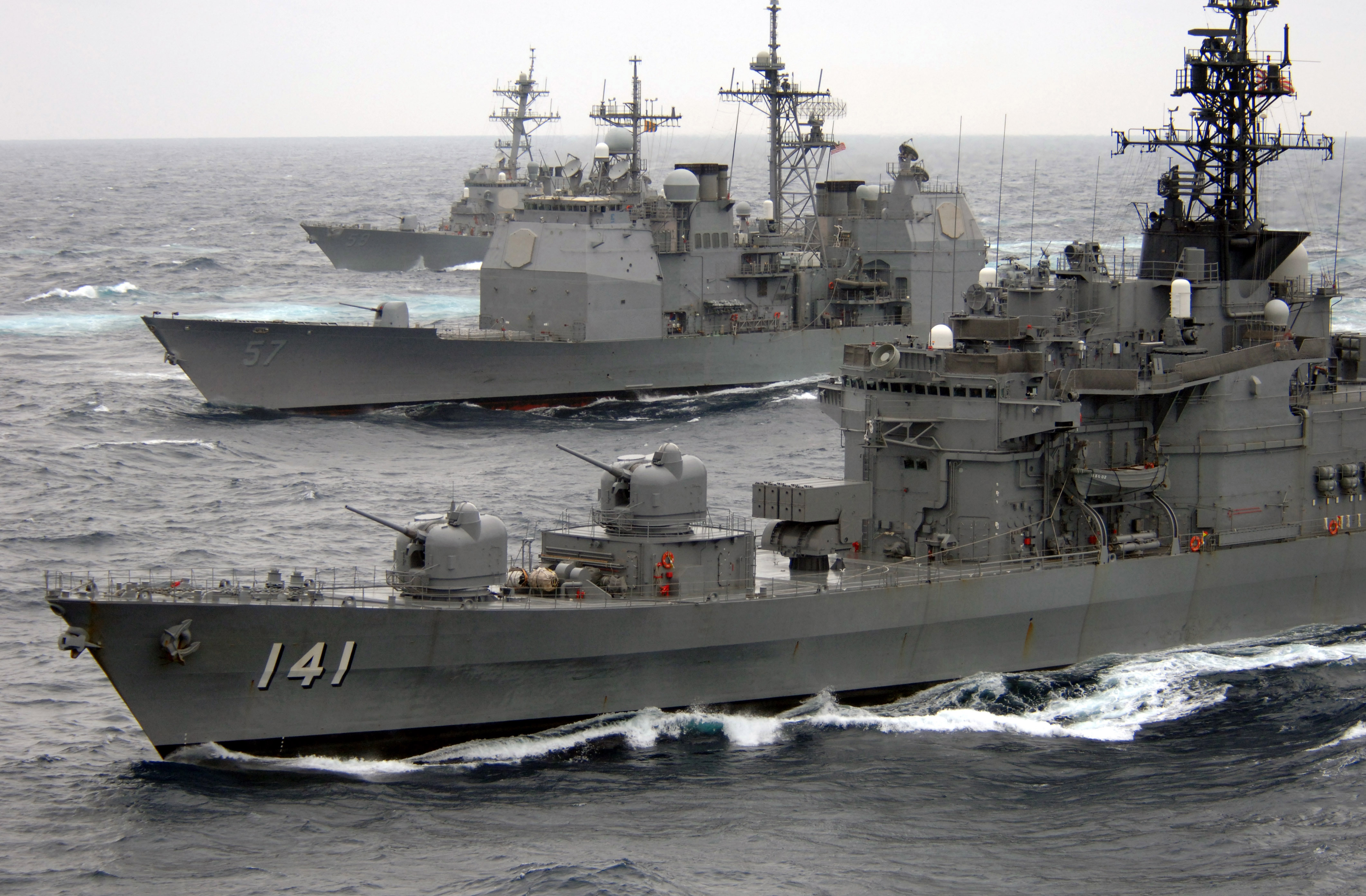
Haruna, USS Lake Champlain and USS Russell underway on 18 March 2007

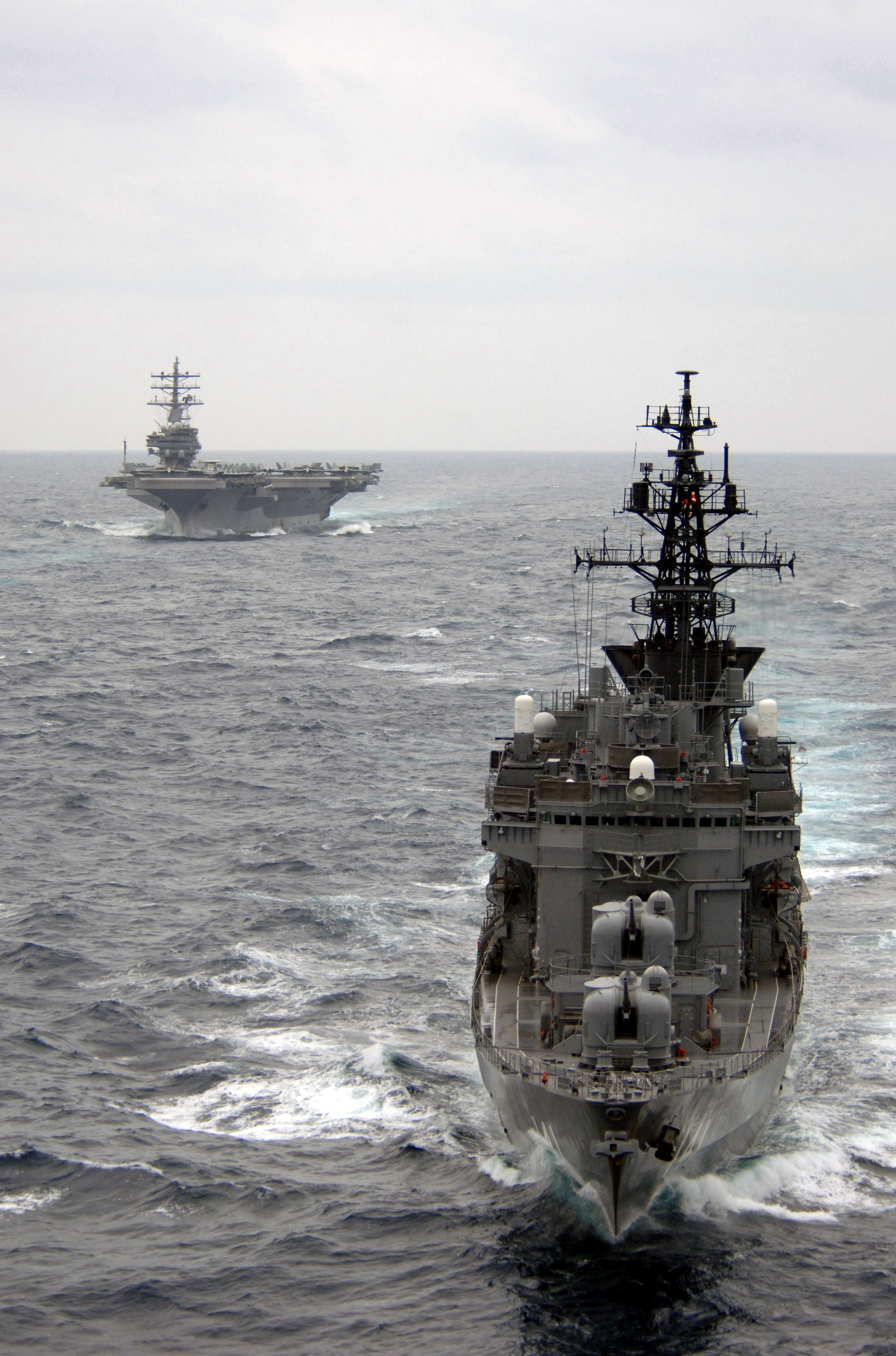
Haruna and USS Ronald Reagan underway on 18 March 2007

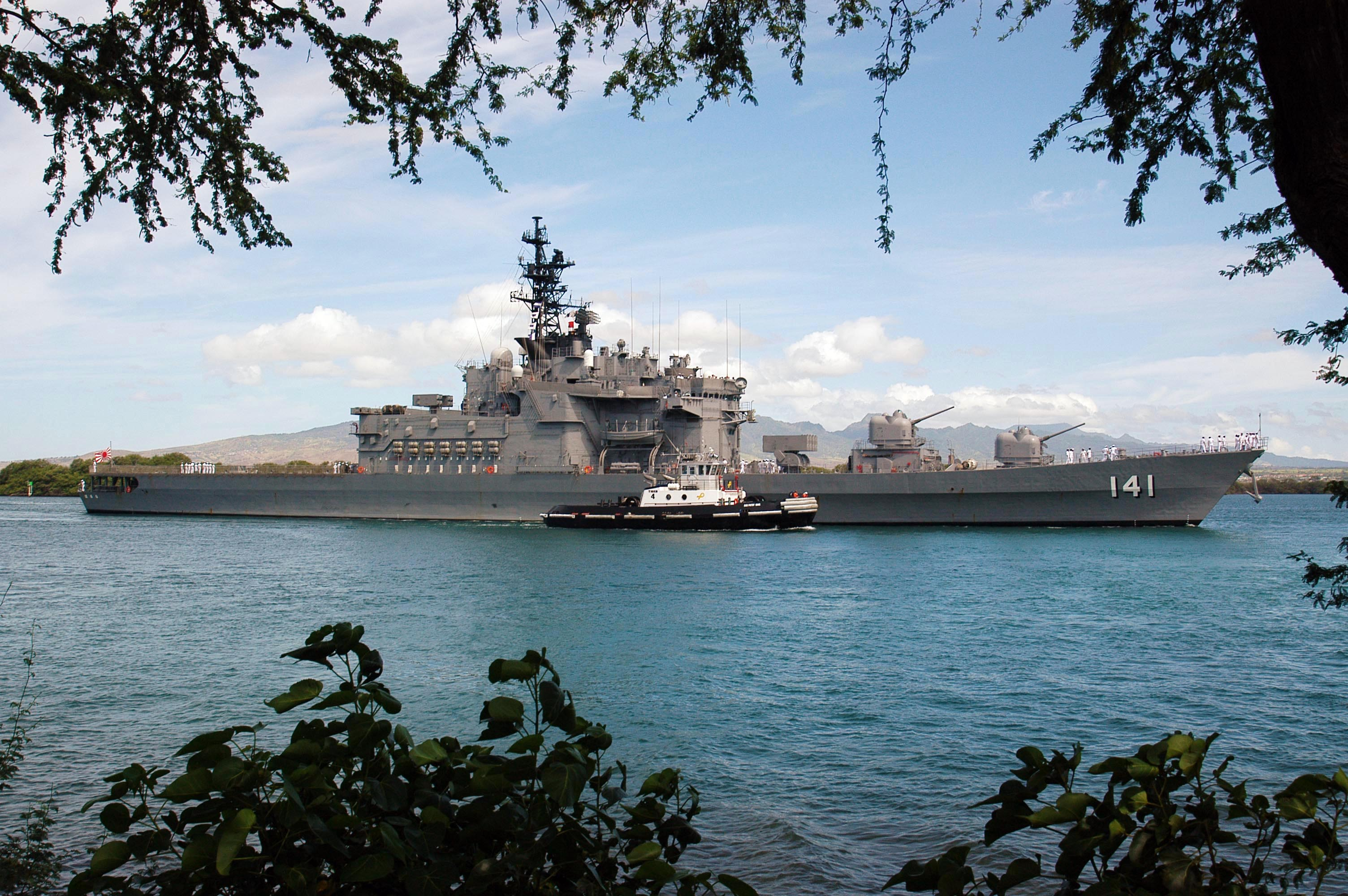
Haruna at Pearl Harbor on 26 June 2008

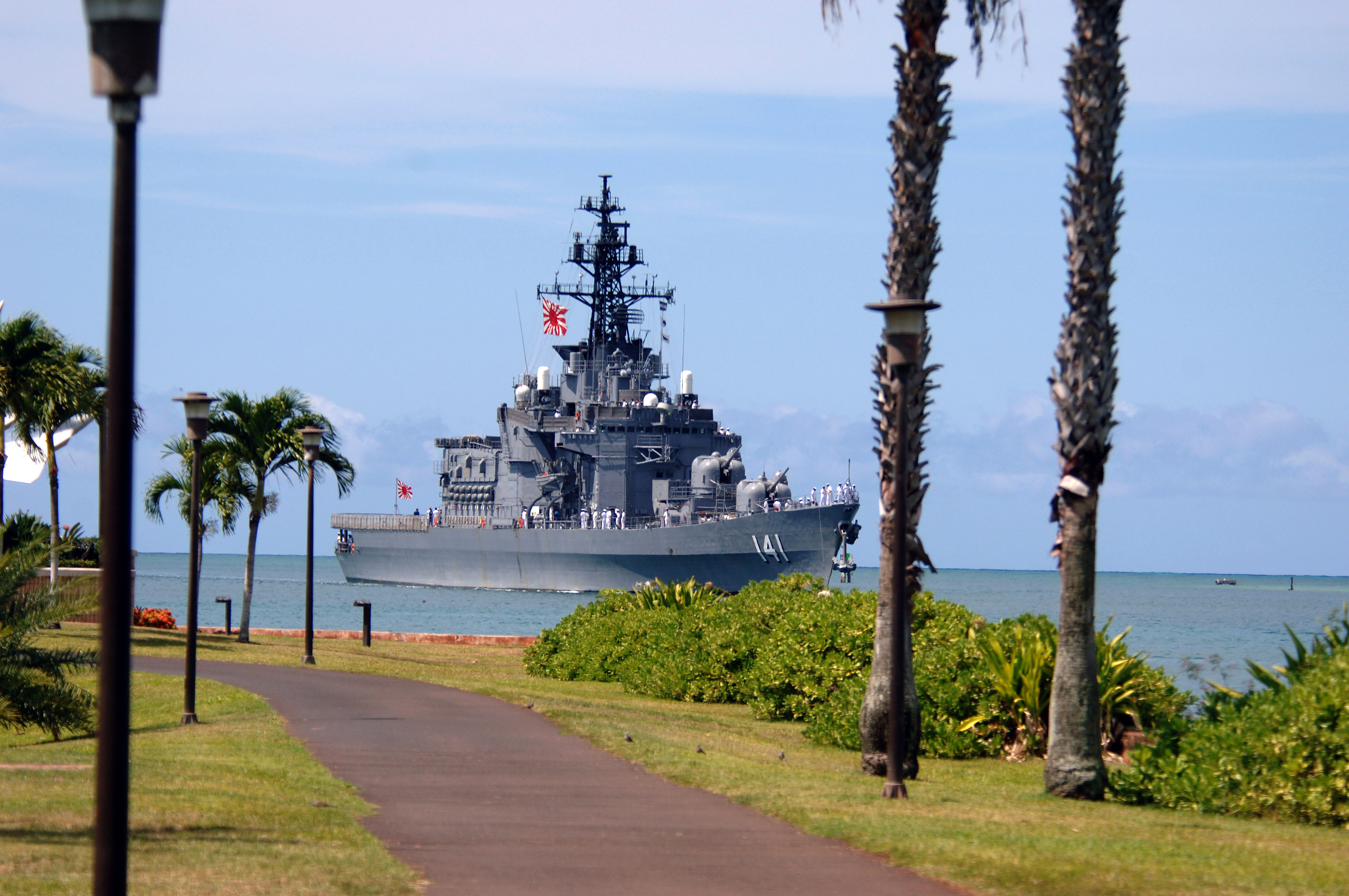
Haruna arriving at Pearl Harbor on 26 June 2008

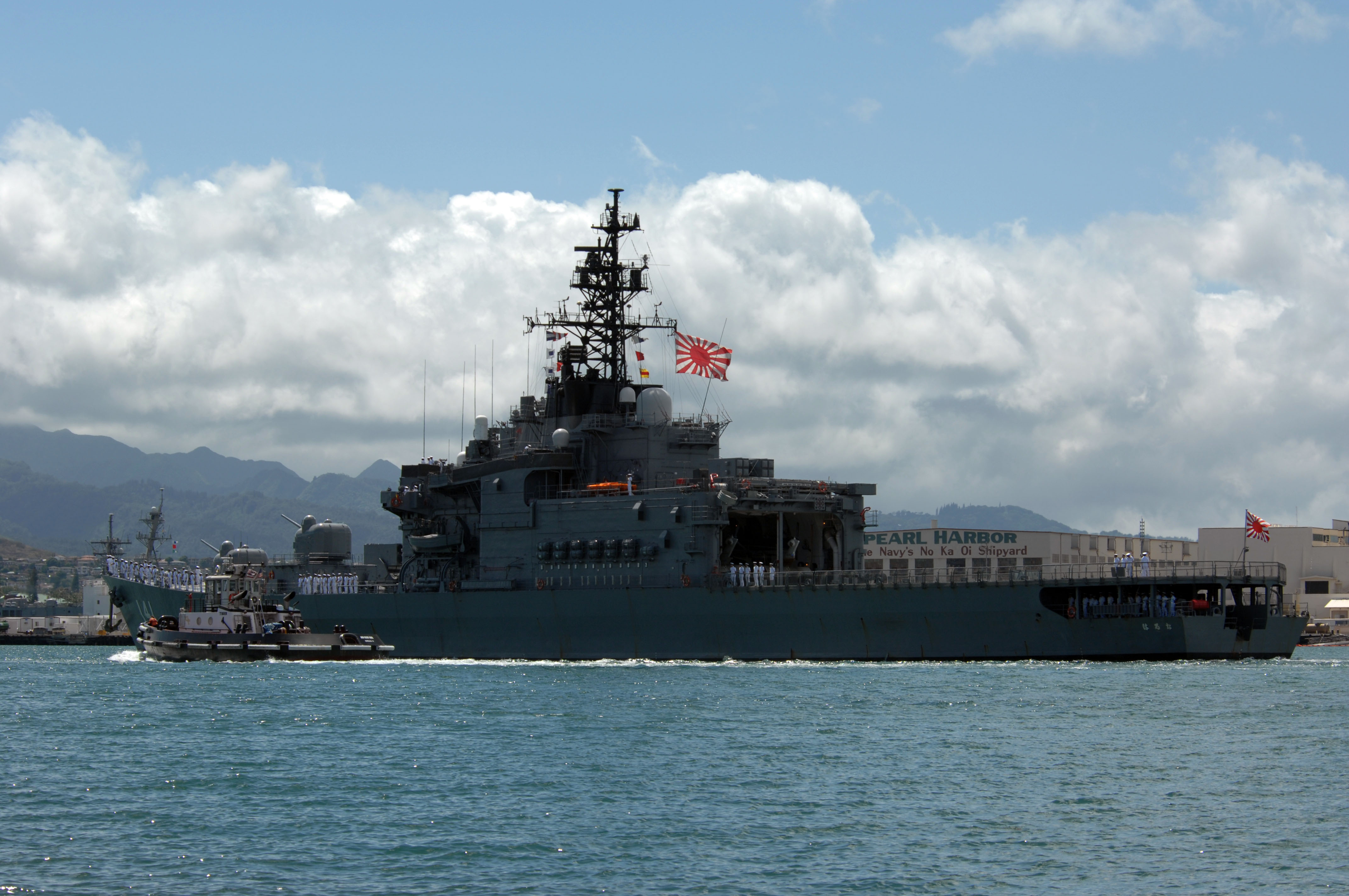

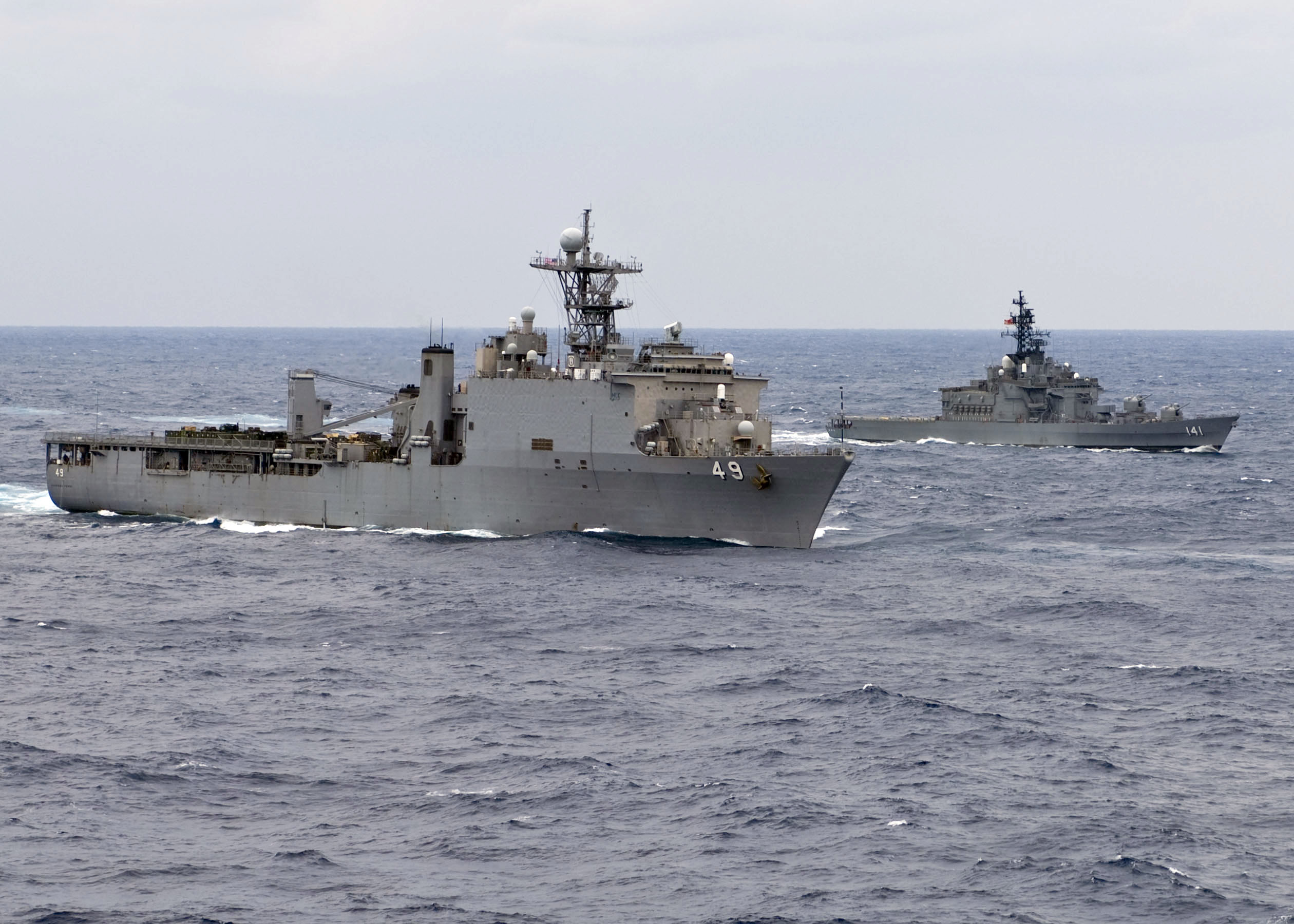
Haruna and USS Harpers Ferry underway on 19 November 2008

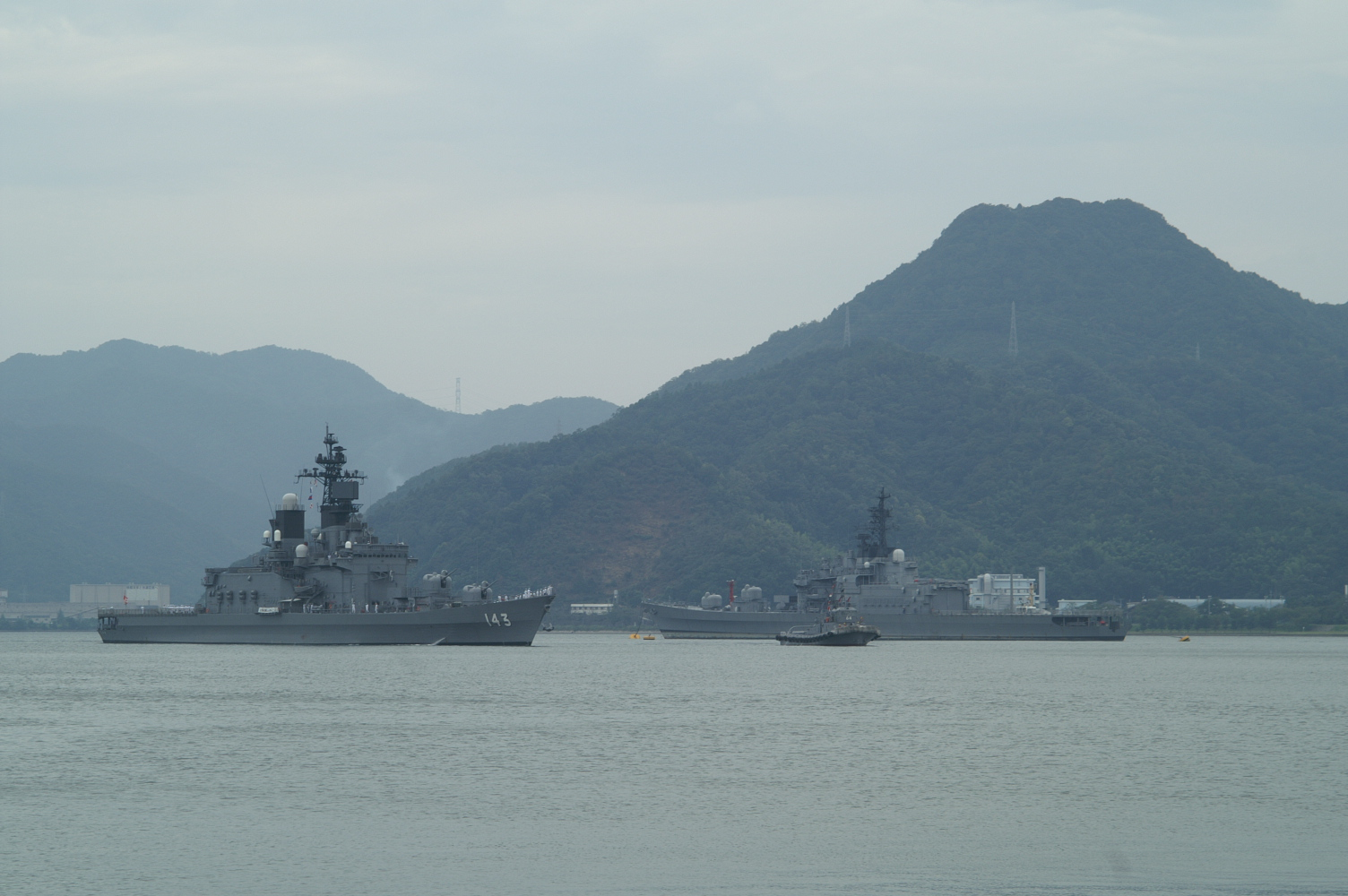
Haruna and JS Shirane on 28 September 2009
