= JDS Amatsukaze =

Japanese first guided missile destroyer

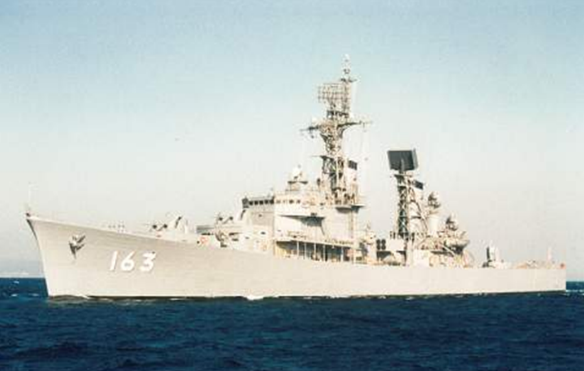
- JDS Amatsukaze underway, date unknown.

History

Japan
- Name: Amatsukaze; (あまつかぜ)
- Namesake: Amatsukaze (1939)
- Ordered: 1961
- Builder: Mitsubishi Heavy Industries
- Laid down: 29 November 1962
- Launched: 5 October 1963
- Commissioned: 15 February 1965
- Decommissioned: 29 November 1995
- Home port: Yokosuka (1965-1986); Maizuru (1986-1995)
- Identification: Pennant number: DDG-163
- Nickname(s): Jet coaster
- Fate: Sunk as target, November 1995

Class overview
- Preceded by: Akizuki class
- Succeeded by: Tachikaze class

General characteristics
- Type: Guided missile destroyer
- Displacement: 3,050 long tons (3,099 t) standard; 4,000 long tons (4,064 t) full load
- Length: 131.0 m (429 ft 9 in) overall
- Beam: 13.4 m (44 ft 0 in)
- Draft: 4.2 m (13 ft 9 in)
- Propulsion: 2 × IHI/GE reaction steam turbines; 2 × IHI Model FWD2 water tube boilers; 60,000 shp (45 MW), 2 shafts
- Speed: 33 knots (38 mph; 61 km/h)
- Complement: 290
- Sensors & processing systems: SPS-29 air-search radar; SPS-39 3D radar; SPG-51 fire-control radar; Mark 63 fire-control system; SQS-4 search sonar; SQR-8 attack sonar
- Electronic warfare & decoys: NOLR-1B intercept
- Armament: 4 × 3"/50 caliber Mk.22 guns; 1 × Mk.13 missile launcher; (40 Tartar missiles); 2 × Mk.15 Hedgehog ASW mortar; 2 × ASW torpedo racks

JDS Amatsukaze (DDG-163) was a guided missile destroyer (DDG) of the Japan Maritime Self-Defense Force (JMSDF), and the only ship of her class. She was the first Japanese surface combatant equipped with surface-to-air missiles.

== Development ==
JDS Amatsukaze was planned as the DDG variant of the preceding Akizuki-class anti-aircraft destroyers, mounting the American Tartar Guided Missile Fire Control System weapon system. However, the Tartar system turned out to be larger than expected, so Amatsukaze's design was altered completely, with an enlarged hull and with a shelter-deck design based on that of the Isuzu class and uprated steam turbines.

== Construction and career ==
She was laid down on 29 November 1962 and launched on 5 October 1963 by Mitsubishi shipyard in Nagasaki. Commissioned on 15 February 1965.

From July 1 to July 31 of the same year, she participated in the maritime training in the direction of Guam with the escort vessels JDS Haruna, JDS Mochizuki and JDS Nagatsuki.

Participated in Exercise RIMPAC 1980 from January 25, 1980, and from February 26 to March 18, the first joint exercise of the Maritime Self-Defense Force with the escort ship JDS Hiei and eight P-2J patrol aircraft as part of the USS Constellation Task Force. She succeeded in all four ship-to-air engagements during the exercises against OPFOR launched from the Royal Australian Navy aircraft carrier HMAS Melbourne. She was highly regarded as the best-performing ship in this exercise for subsequently preventing USS Sargo, also part of the aggressor force, from "finishing off" the Constellation. Amatsukaze returned to Japan on April 2.

From July 1 to July 31, 1992, she participated in the maritime training in the Philippines with the escort vessels JDS Setoyuki, JDS Asayuki and JDS Mineyuki.

Removed from the register on November 29, 1995. During the active period of 30 years and 9 months, the total voyage was 764,314 miles (about 1.4 million km), the total voyage time was 62,999.53 hours, and the Maritime Self-Defense Force exercises participated 19 times, integrated exercises 4 times, and 9 times. She was eventually sunk as an actual target for anti-ship missiles off Wakasa Bay.

Her port propeller is left at Yokosuka Education Corps, the starboard propeller is left at Yokosuka naval base, and the main anchor is left at Maizuru naval base.

== Tartar missiles ==
Amatsukaze was one of the earliest foreign ships equipped with the American Tartar system. (The other is the French Kersaint-class DDG). Because of the financial burden of this expensive weapon system, the other equipment aboard Amatsukaze was almost the same as that of the Ayanami class at first, but the JMSDF applied a spiral model to Amatsukaze, allowing continual updating of her equipment as described in the following table.

The Tartar weapon system made a strong positive impression on the JMSDF, but it was too expensive for the JMSDF to be able to afford another Tartar-equipped DDG at once. As a result, the JMSDF had to wait 10 years to build another DDG, the first Tachikaze-class destroyer.

	1965	1995
SAM	RIM-24B Improved Tartar	RIM-66 SM-1MR
SUM	none	RUR-5 ASROC with Mk.112 octuple launcher
Torpedo launcher	Mk.2 over-the-side launchers	Mk.32 triple torpedo tubes
3D radar	AN/SPS-39	AN/SPS-52
GFCS	Mk.63 mod.14	FCS-2-21D
Sonar	AN/SQS-4 (search); AN/SQR-8 (attack)	AN/SQS-23
EW	NOLR-1B (intercept)	NOLR-6B (intercept); OLR-9B (missile warning); OLT-3 (jammer)

== Ships in class ==
Building no.	Pennant no.	Name	Laid down	Launched	Completed	Decommissioned
2303	DDG-163	Amatsukaze	29 November 1962	5 October 1963	15 February 1965	29 November 1995

== Gallery ==
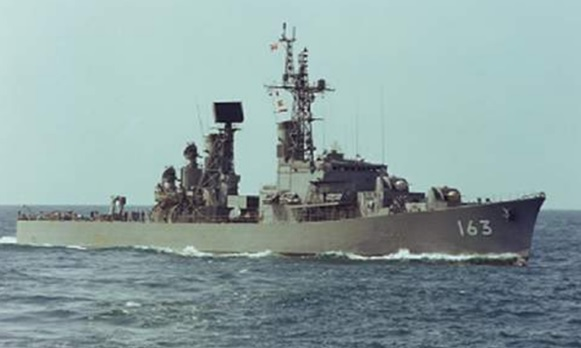
JDS Amatsukaze underway, date unknown.

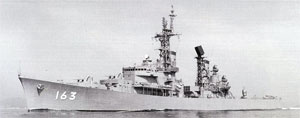
JDS Amatsukaze underway, date unknown.

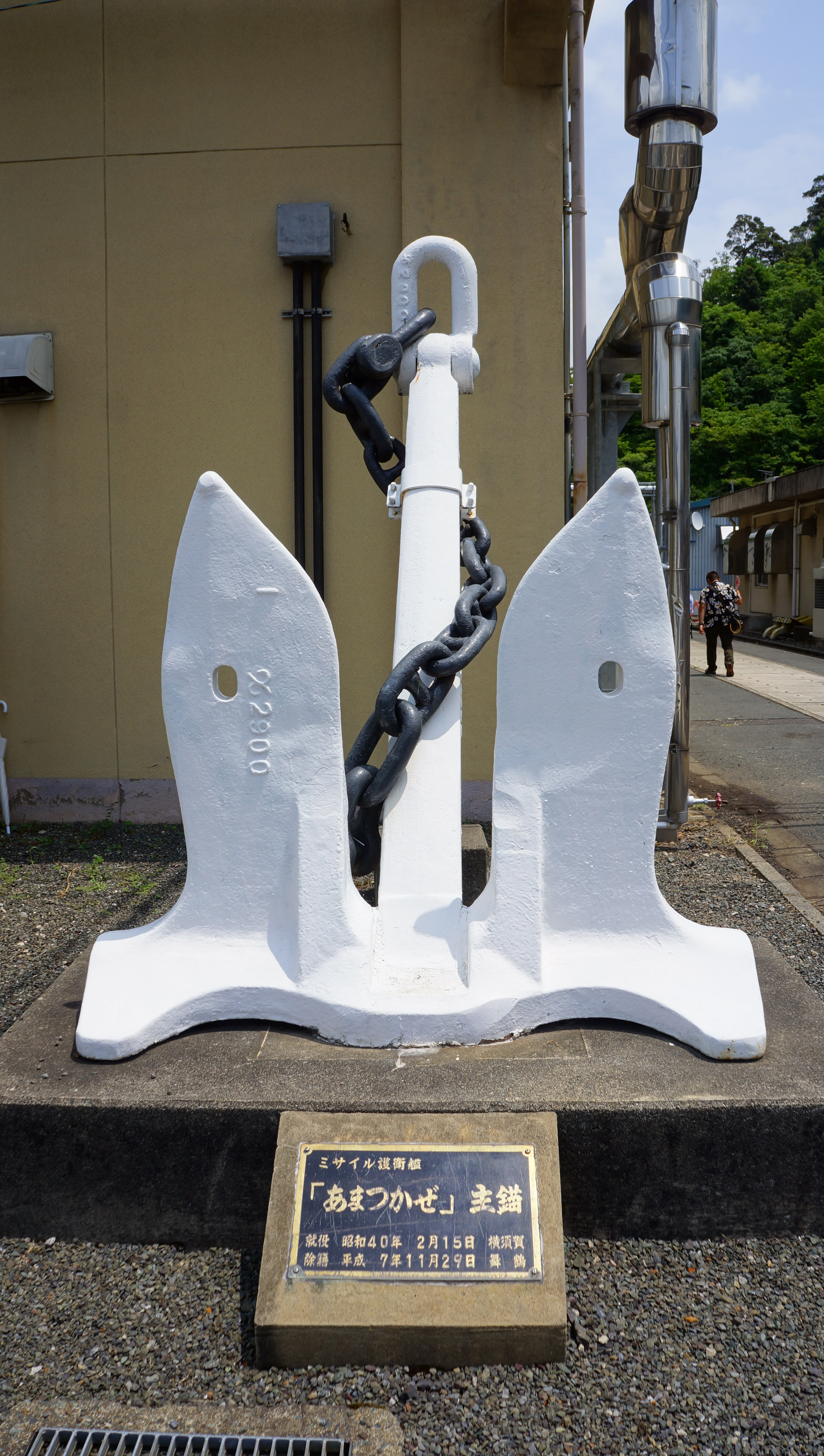
JDS Amatsukaze’s anchor on display at JMSDF Naval Base Maizuru.

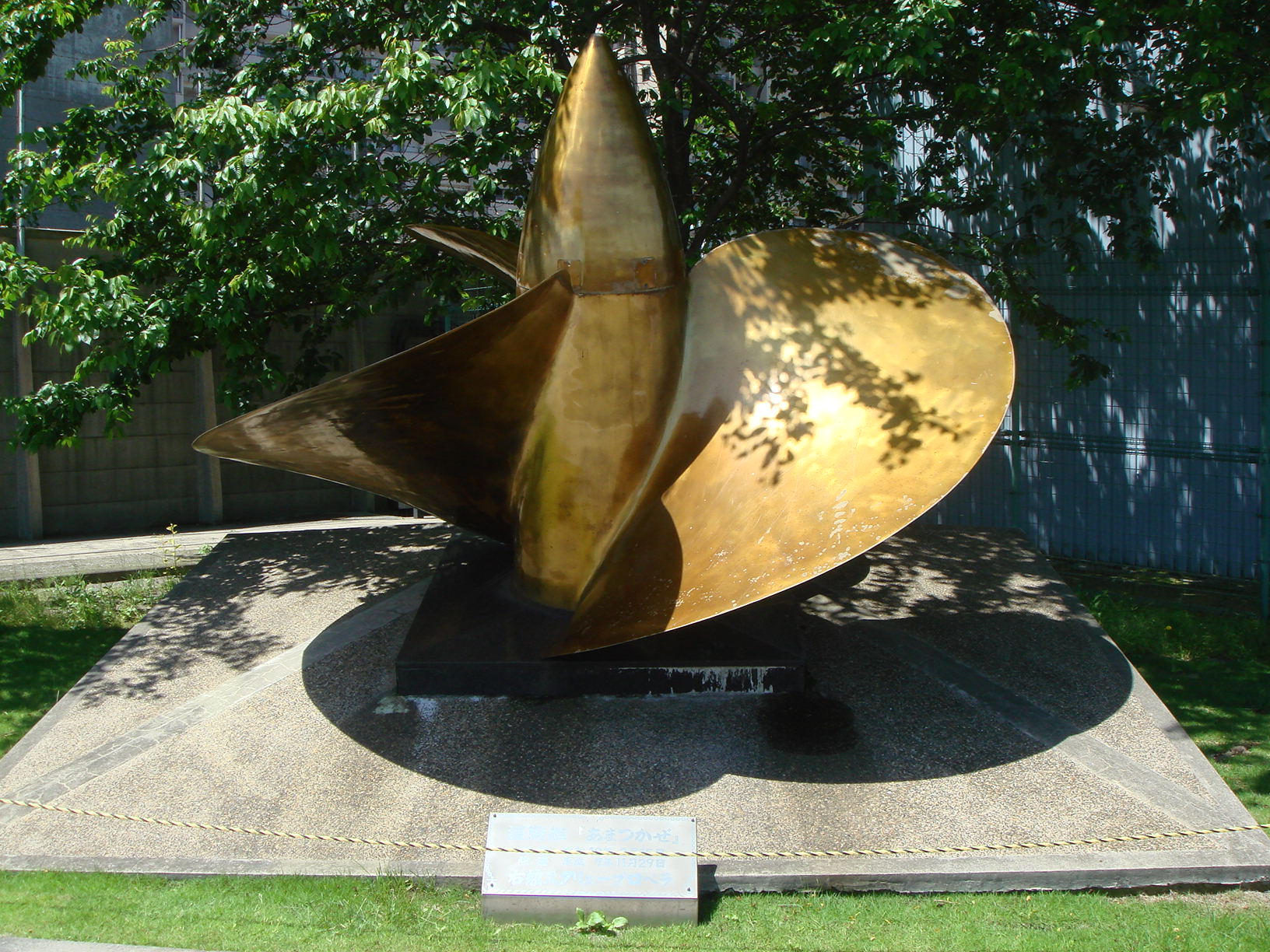
JDS Amatsukaze’s right propeller on display at Yokosuka Naval Base.
