= JDS Tachikaze =

Tachikaze-class guided missile destroyer

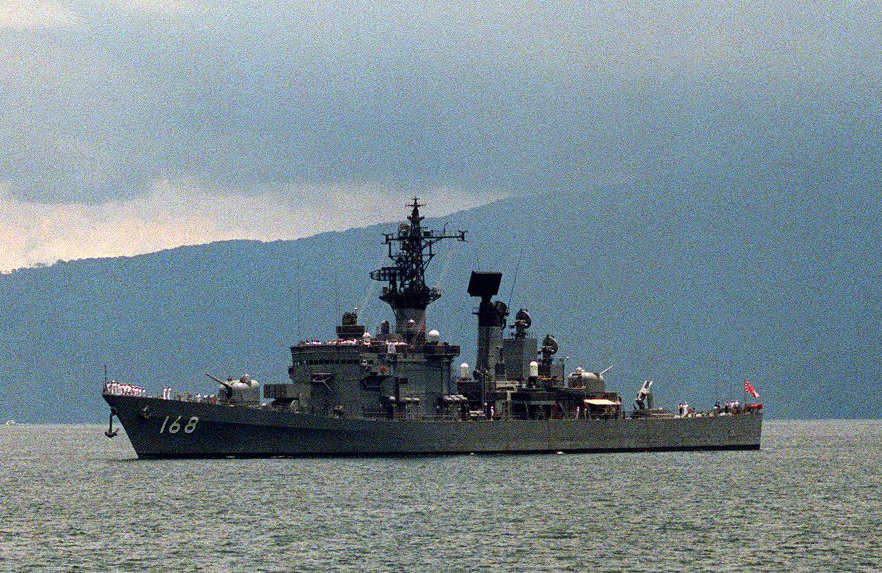
- JDS Tachikaze at anchor, Luzon on 1 July 1990.

History

Japan
- Name: Tachikaze; (たちかぜ)
- Namesake: Tachikaze (1921)
- Builder: Mitsubishi, Nagasaki
- Laid down: 19 June 1973
- Launched: 12 December 1974
- Commissioned: 26 March 1976
- Decommissioned: 15 January 2007
- Home port: Sasebo (1976-1995); Yokosuka (1995-2007)
- Identification: Pennant number: DDG-168
- Fate: Sunk as target, June 2009

General characteristics
- Type: Tachikaze-class destroyer
- Displacement: 3,850 long tons (3,910 t) standard; 3,950 long tons (4,010 t) (DDG170)
- Length: 143 m (469 ft 2 in)
- Beam: 14.3 m (46 ft 11 in)
- Draft: 4.6 m (15 ft 1 in); 4.7 m (15 ft 5 in) (DDG170)
- Propulsion: 2 × Mitsubishi steam turbines, 60,000 hp (45,000 kW); 2 shafts
- Speed: 32 knots (37 mph; 59 km/h)
- Complement: 250; 230 (DDG168); 255 (DDG170)
- Armament: 2 × 5"/54 caliber Mark 42 gun (DDG168 ×1); 2 × 20 mm Phalanx CIWS; 1 × Mk 13 missile launcher (for the Standard-MR SAM); 8 × Boeing Harpoon SSM; 1 × Type 74 launcher for the ASROC; 2 × HOS-301 triple 324 mm (12.8 in) torpedo tubes

JDS Tachikaze (DDG-168) is the lead ship of the Tachikaze-class destroyer built for the Japan Maritime Self-Defense Force (JMSDF).

== Development ==
The Tachikaze-class destroyers were designed almost exclusively as anti-aircraft platforms. No helicopter facilities are provided, and the ASW armament is confined to ASROC missiles and Mk 46 torpedoes. In order to save on construction costs the class adopted the propulsion plant and machinery of the Haruna-class destroyers.

== Construction and career ==
She was laid down on 19 June 1973 in Mitsubishi shipyard in Nagasaki. She was launched on 12 December 1974, and commissioned on 26 March 1976. She was decommissioned on 15 July 2007.

From 1 November to 17 December 1980, she participated in Hawaii dispatch training with the escort vessels JDS Kikuzuki, JDS Mochizuki and eight P-2Js. This year, the anti-aircraft radar (OPS-11), which was not equipped at the time of commissioning, was equipped.

She participated in the Exercise RIMPAC events in 1982, 1986, 1992, and 1996.

In 1998, JDS Tachikaze was converted to be the flagship of the Fleet Escort Force. The aft 5-inch gun was replaced with a fleet command area. JDS Sawakaze then succeeded her in the flagship role after her decommissioning.

Tachikaze became a target ship for multiple ships and aircraft and was sunk during the live ammunition training conducted in the southeastern waters of Hachijojima from 5 to 8 June 2009.

== Gallery ==
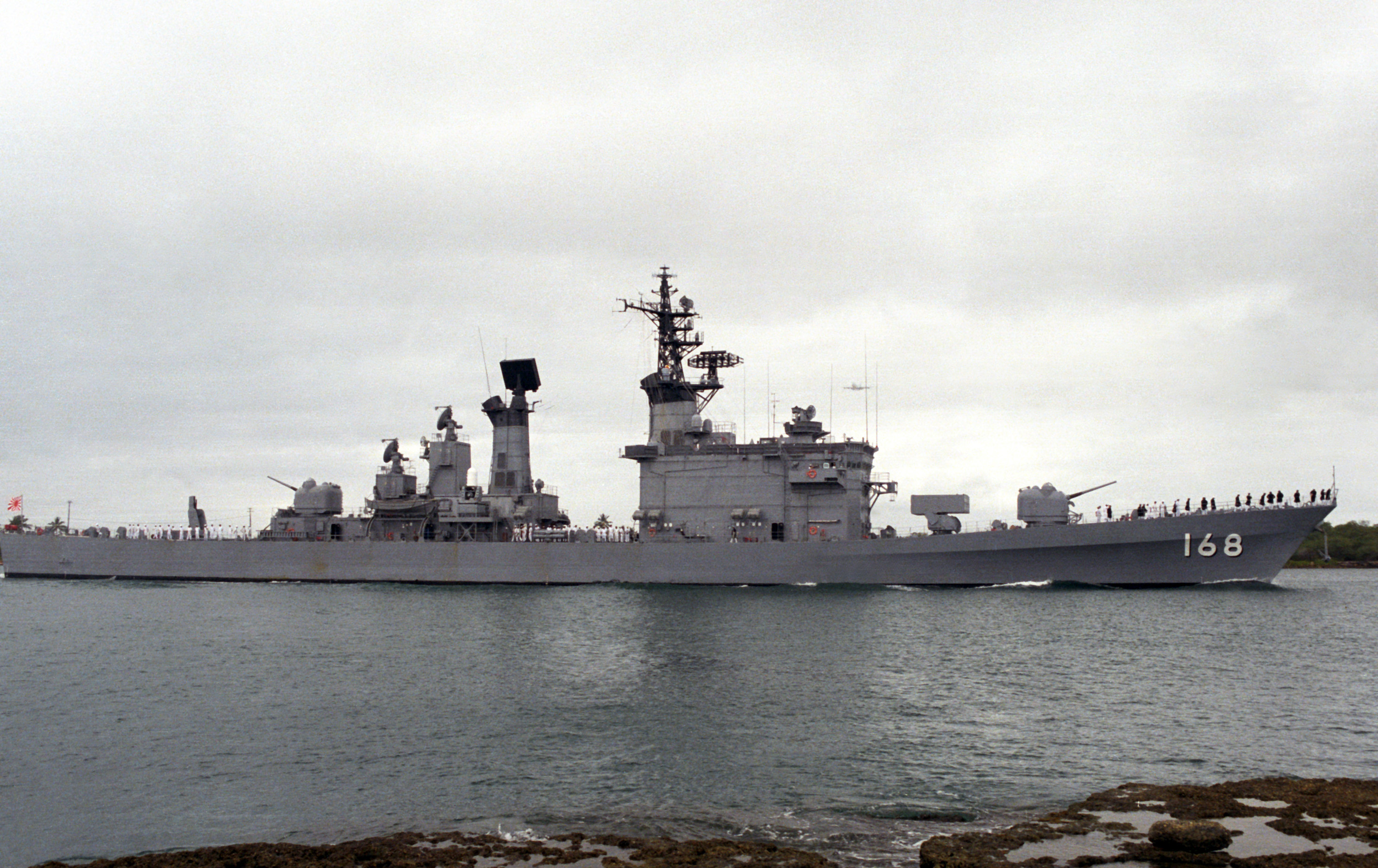
JDS Tachikaze entering Pearl Harbor on 1 June 1986 prior to RIMPAC 1986.

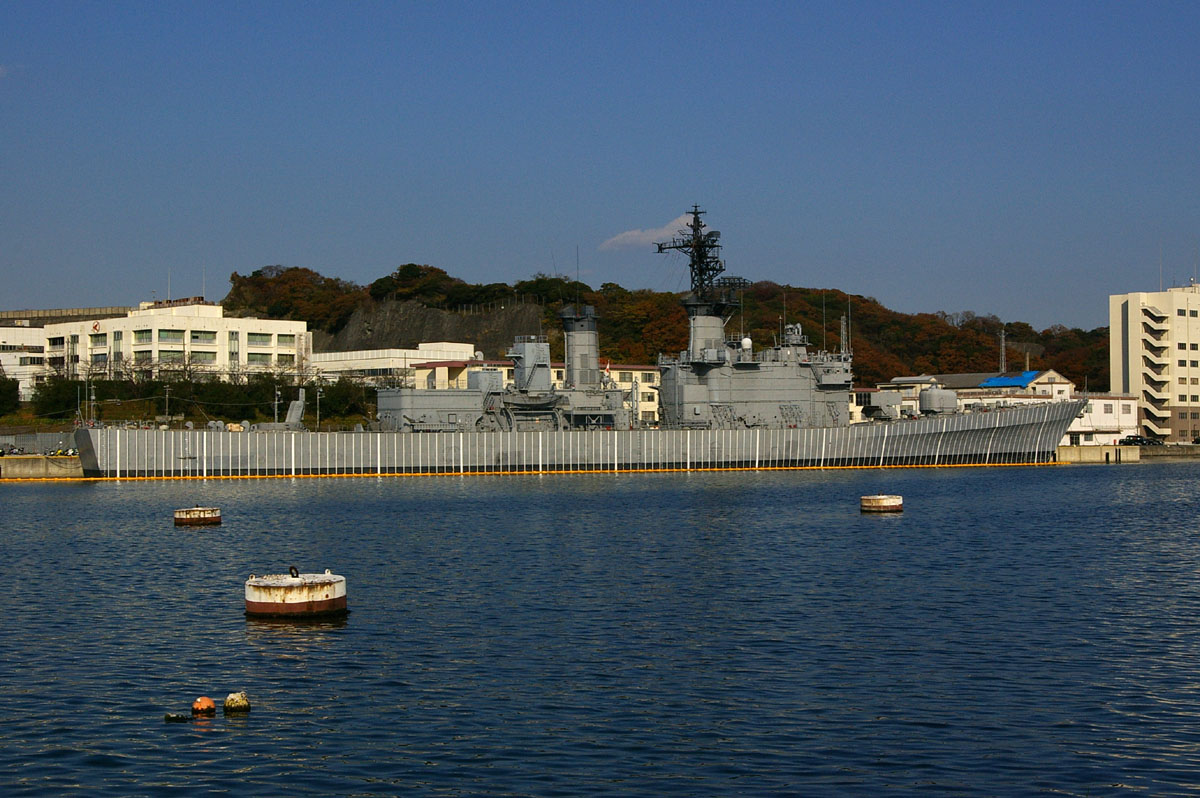
JS Tachikaze in Yokosuka on 9 December 2007

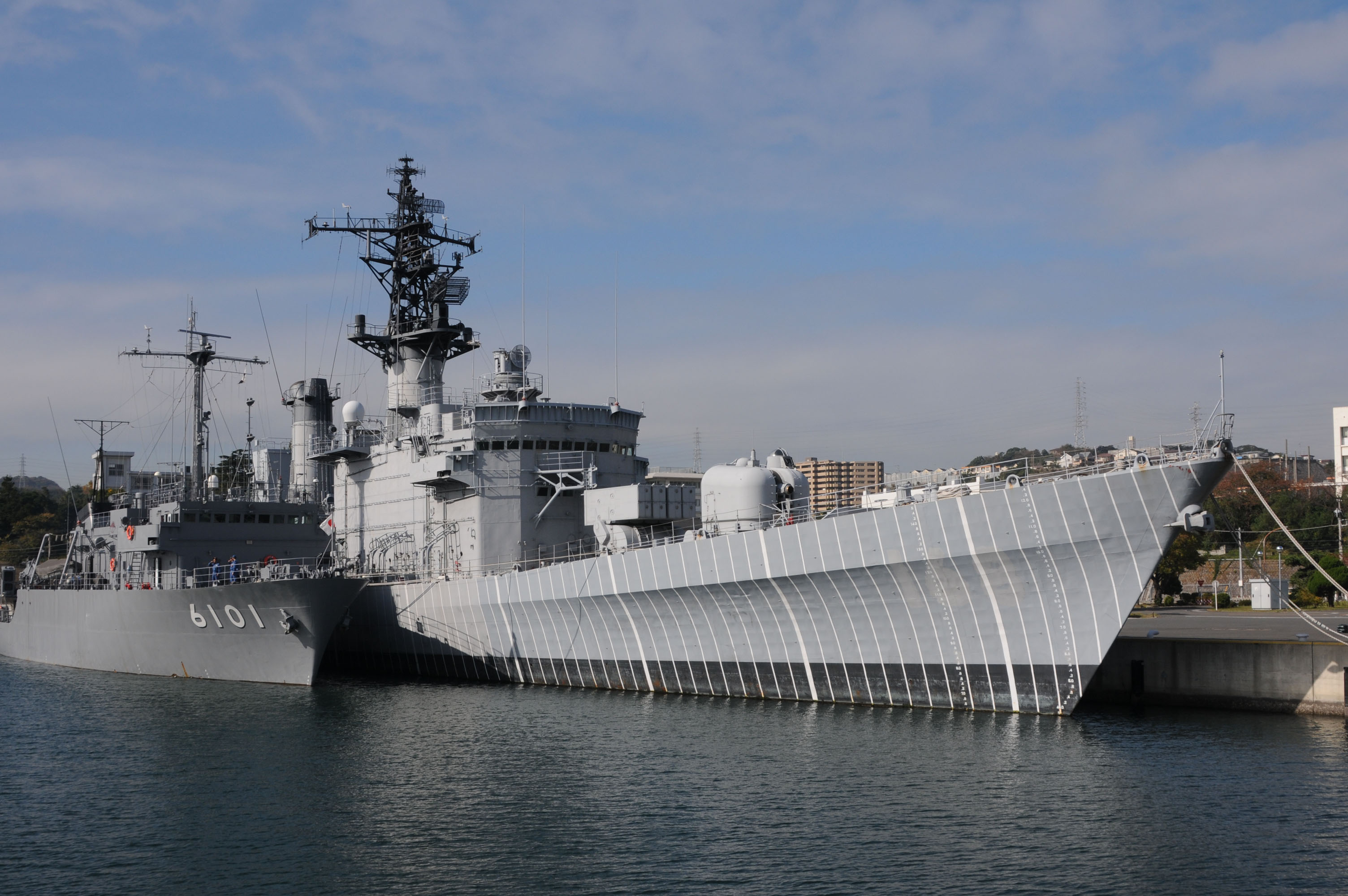
JS Tachikaze and JS Kurihama on 14 November 2008
