= Shirane-class destroyer =

1970s class of Japanese destroyers

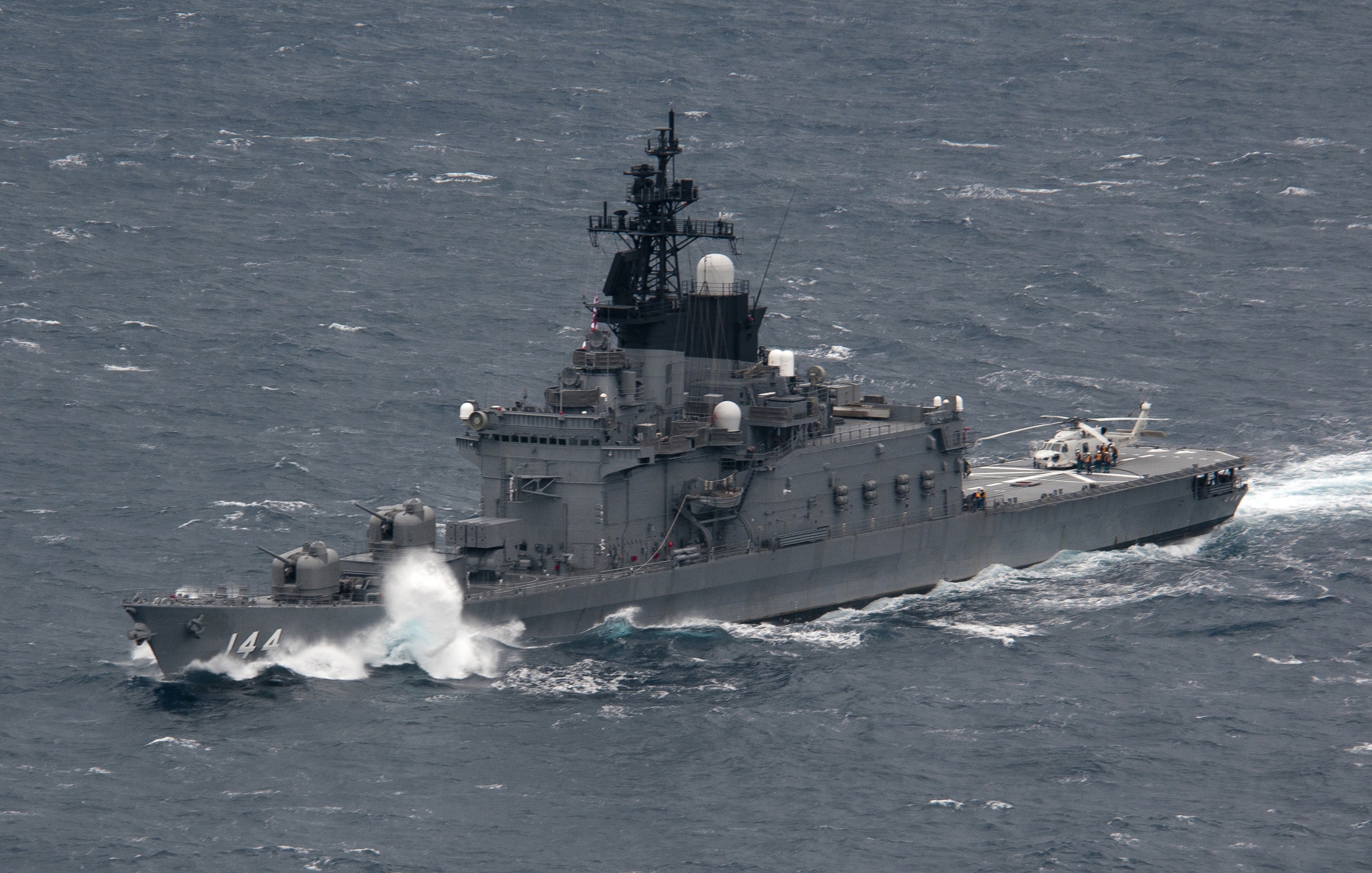
- Kurama (DDH-144) at sea in 2011

Class overview
- Name: Shirane-class destroyer
- Builders: Ishikawajima-Harima Heavy Industries
- Operators: Japan Maritime Self-Defense Force
- Preceded by: Haruna-class destroyer
- Succeeded by: Hyūga-class helicopter destroyer
- Built: 1977–1981
- In commission: 1980–2017
- Planned: 2
- Completed: 2
- Retired: 2

General characteristics
- Type: Destroyer
- Displacement: 5,200 long tons (5,283 t) standard; 7,500 long tons (7,620 t) full load
- Length: 159 m (522 ft)
- Beam: 17.5 m (57 ft 5 in)
- Draft: 5.3 m (17 ft 5 in)
- Propulsion: 2 × IHI boilers 850 psi (60 kg/cm², 5.9 MPa), 430 °C; 2 × turbines; 2 shafts; 70,000 shp (52 MW)
- Speed: 31 knots (36 mph; 57 km/h)
- Complement: 350; 360 (DDH-144); 20 staff
- Sensors & processing systems: OPS-12 3D Air-search radar; OPS-28 surface-search radar; OQS-101 bow sonar; AN/SQS-35/SQR-18 VDS-TASS
- Electronic warfare & decoys: NOLQ-1 integrated suite; OLR-9B RWR; Mark 36 SRBOC
- Armament: Sea Sparrow SAM launcher; ASROC Mk 112 octuple launcher; 2 × FMC 5-inch/54-caliber Mark 42 guns; 2 × 20 mm Phalanx CIWS; 2 × Mark 32 triple torpedo tubes (Mk-46 torpedoes)
- Aircraft carried: 3 × SH-60J(K) anti-submarine helicopters

The Shirane-class destroyers were a pair of Japanese destroyers originally built during the late 1970s. They are built around a large central hangar which houses up to three helicopters and they are the natural successor of the Haruna-class destroyers.

== Design ==
The Shirane class incorporates an improved design based on the Haruna-class destroyers. The ships propulsion includes two steam boilers with two shafts that produces 70.000 hp and gives a maximum speed of 32 knots.

Its armament includes two Mk.42 127mm guns, two 20-mm Phalanx close-in weapon systems, one surface-to-air RIM-7 Sea Sparrow launcher, torpedoes and anti-submarine rockets. The ships have been replaced by the new Izumo-class helicopter destroyers.

== Ships in the class ==
Pennant No	DDH-143	DDH-144
Name	Shirane	Kurama
Laid Down	25 February 1977	17 February 1978
Launched	18 September 1978	20 September 1979
Commissioned	17 March 1980	27 March 1981
Decommissioned	25 March 2015	22 March 2017
Home port	Yokosuka	Sasebo

== Operational use ==
On December 15, 2007, a fire broke out on board Shirane near the rudder house as it was anchored at Yokosuka. It took seven hours to extinguish the fire, which injured four crew members.

On 27 October 2009, JS Kurama collided with a South Korean container ship under the Kanmonkyo Bridge in the Kanmon Straits off the coast of Japan. While neither ship sunk, the bow of Kurama was badly damaged and burned for hours. Three Kurama crew members were reported injured.
