= JS Shirane =

Shirane-class helicopter destroyer

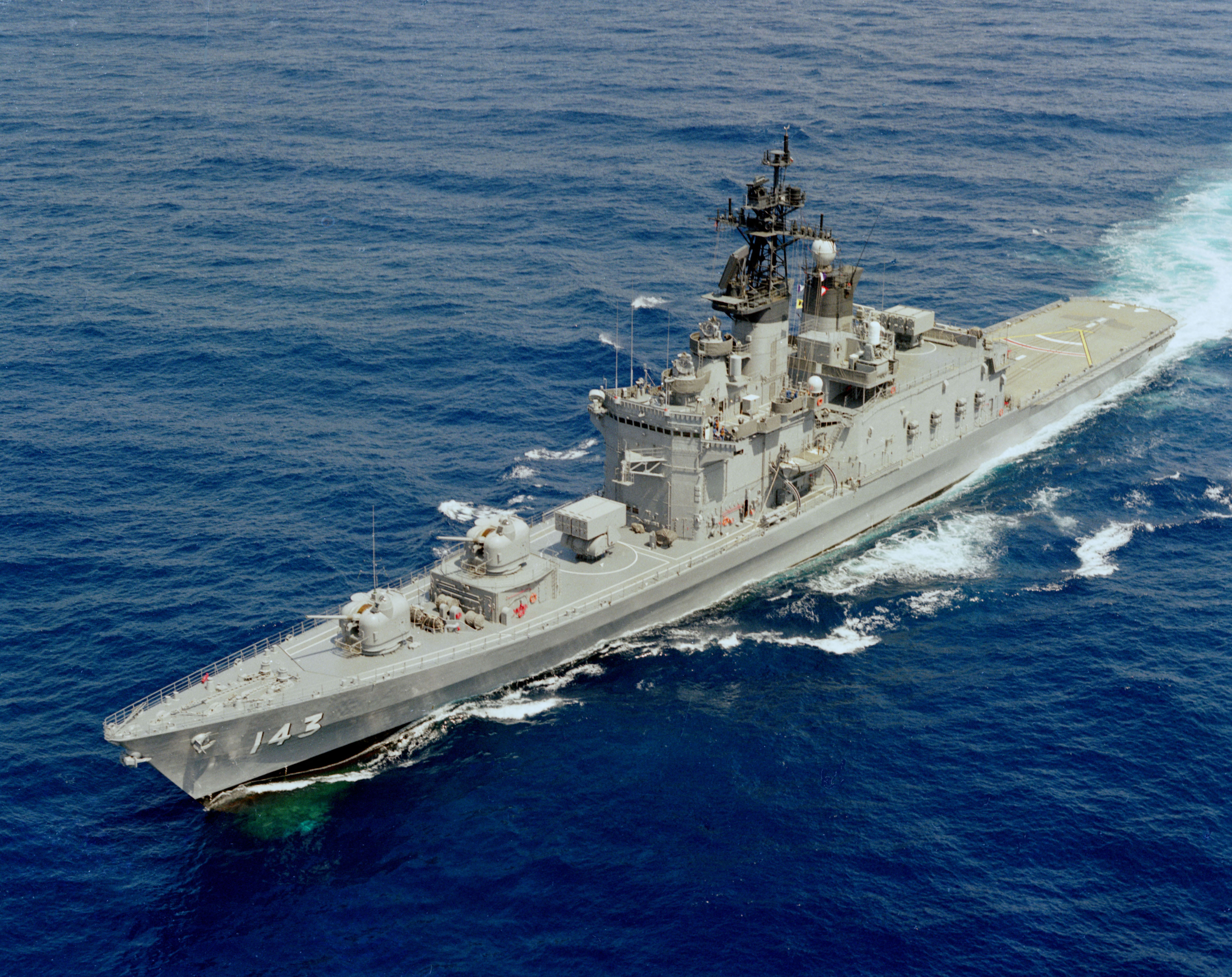
- JS Shirane underway in 2013

History

Japan
- Name: Shirane; (しらね)
- Namesake: Mount Shirane
- Ordered: 1975
- Builder: IHI, Tokyo
- Laid down: 25 February 1977
- Launched: 18 September 1978
- Commissioned: 17 March 1980
- Decommissioned: 25 March 2015
- Home port: Yokosuka (1980-2009); Maizuru (2009-2015)
- Identification: MMSI number: 431999501; Pennant number: DDH-143
- Fate: Scrapped

General characteristics
- Class & type: Shirane-class destroyer
- Displacement: 5,200 long tons (5,300 t) standard; 7,500 long tons (7,600 t) full load
- Length: 159 m (522 ft)
- Beam: 17.5 m (57 ft)
- Draft: 5.3 m (17 ft)
- Propulsion: 2 × IHI boilers 850 psi (60 kg/cm², 5.9 MPa), 430 °C; 2 × turbines; 2 shafts; 70,000 shp (52 MW)
- Speed: 31 knots (36 mph; 57 km/h)
- Complement: 350; 20 staff
- Armament: Sea Sparrow SAM launcher; ASROC Mk 112 octuple launcher; 2 × FMC 5"/54 caliber Mark 42 guns; 2 × 20 mm Phalanx CIWS; 2 × Mark 32 triple torpedo tubes (Mk-46 torpedoes)
- Aircraft carried: 3 × SH-60J(K) anti-submarine helicopters

JS Shirane (しらね, Shi-ra-ne) (DDH-143) was the lead ship of her class of destroyers in the Japan Maritime Self-Defense Force (JMSDF).

== Construction and career ==
The vessel was laid down by Ishikawajima-Harima in Tokyo on February 25, 1977; launched on September 18, 1978; and commissioned on March 17, 1980.

In 2011, after the 2011 Tōhoku earthquake and tsunami, she was used as a relief ship. In 2012, along with attending RIMPAC, she also attended Fleet Week, a United States naval tradition in which naval ships are showcased. On December 15, 2007, a fire broke out on board Shirane near the rudder house as she was anchored at Yokosuka. It took seven hours to extinguish and injured four crew members.

Shirane visited Baltimore on her way to New York City as part of Fleet Week 2012. She was open to visitors for a few days. she passed by the Freedom Tower as part of the ship parade in New York Harbor and the Hudson River on May 23, 2012. Shirane was one of three ships sent by the Japan Maritime Self-Defense Force to attend Exercise RIMPAC, along with JS Bungo and the destroyer JS Myōkō.

She was decommissioned on March 25, 2015, as the Shirane class was slowly being phased out by the newer Izumo-class helicopter destroyers.

== Post-decommissioning ==
In November 2015, the Japanese Ministry of Defense announced that Shirane would be in a live-fire test against the XASM-3 supersonic anti-ship missile in 2016. After undergoing several tests in Wakasa Bay as a target for XASM-3 she was sold for scrapping on October 31 and dismantling began on the same day.
