= Tachikaze-class destroyer =

Japanese guided missile destroyer class

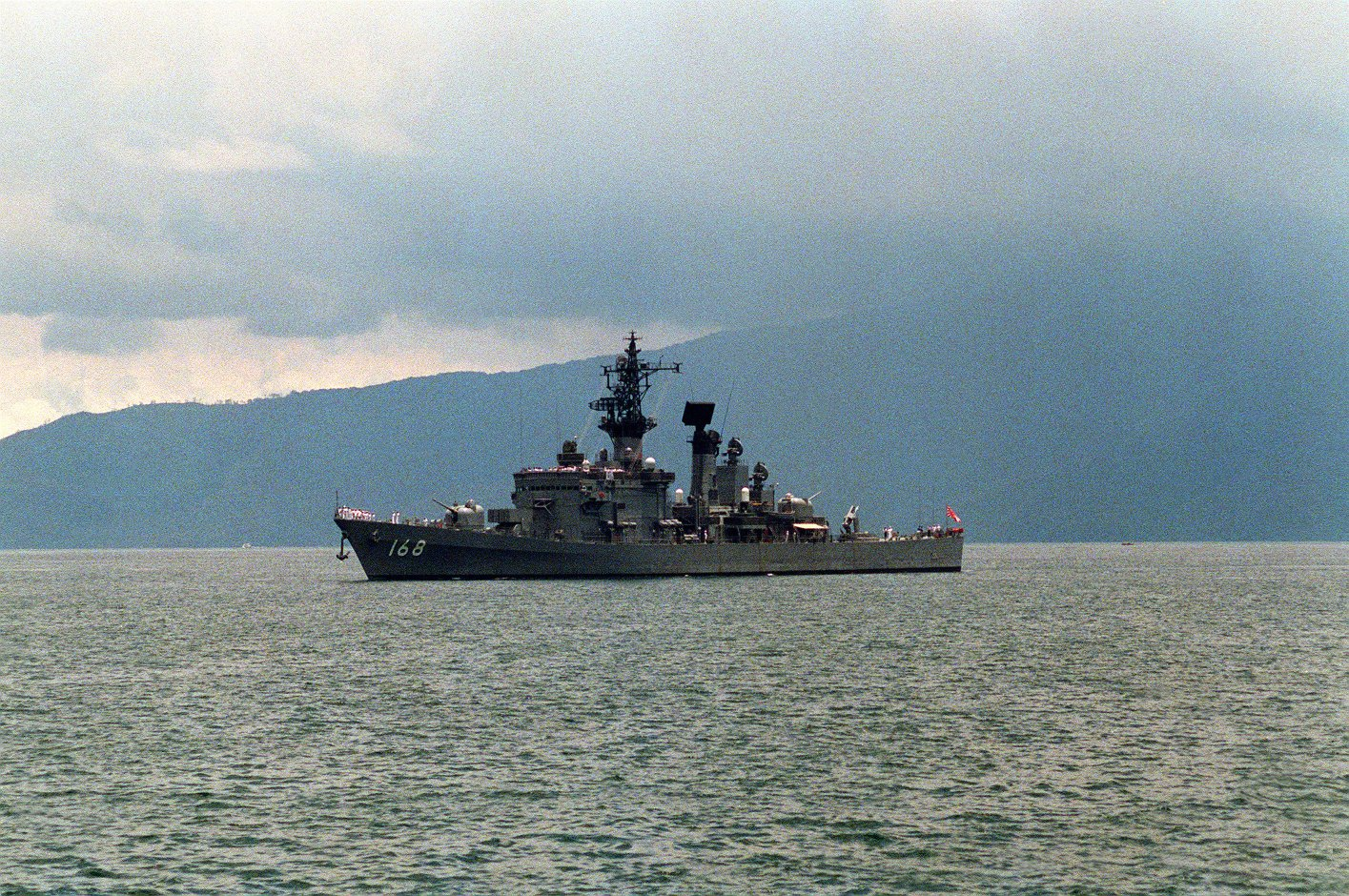
- JDS Tachikaze

Class overview
- Name: Tachikaze class
- Builders: Mitsubishi Heavy Industries
- Operators: Japan Maritime Self-Defense Force
- Preceded by: Amatsukaze
- Succeeded by: Hatakaze class
- Built: 1973-1983
- In service: 1976–2010
- Completed: 3
- Retired: 3

General characteristics
- Type: Guided-missile destroyer
- Displacement: 3,850 long tons (3,910 t) standard; 3,950 long tons (4,010 t) (DDG170)
- Length: 143 m (469 ft 2 in)
- Beam: 14.3 m (46 ft 11 in)
- Draft: 4.6 m (15 ft 1 in); 4.7 m (15 ft 5 in) (DDG170)
- Propulsion: 2 × Mitsubishi steam turbines, 60,000 hp (45,000 kW); 2 shafts
- Speed: 32 knots (37 mph; 59 km/h)
- Complement: 250; 230 (DDG168); 255 (DDG170)
- Armament: 2 × 5"/54 caliber Mark 42 gun (DDG168 ×1); 2 × 20 mm Phalanx CIWS; 1 × Mk 13 missile launcher (for the Standard-MR SAM); 8 × Boeing Harpoon SSM; 1 × Type 74 launcher for the ASROC; 2 × HOS-301 triple 324 mm (12.8 in) torpedo tubes

The Tachikaze-class destroyer was a second generation guided missile destroyer class, formerly in service with the Japan Maritime Self-Defense Force (JMSDF). The ships of this class have had successive improvements after their completion, especially to their C4I systems. These air-defense warships are the natural successor to the first generation air-defense ship, the Amatsukaze-class destroyer, and they were in turn, followed by newer air-defense ships, the Hatakaze class.

== Design ==
The Tachikaze class was equipped with the Tartar-D system as the key weapon system, the fleet-area air defense weapon system with the Standard-1 MR missile. At the same time, this was the American first native integrated weapon system with the Naval Tactical Data System (NTDS), so this class was the first of the Maritime Self Defense Force's ships that utilised computers widely. As the NTDS, OYQ-1 Weapon Entry System (WES) was on board on the lead ship, Tachikaze. The OYQ-1 WES was based on the technology of the NYYA-1 which was on board on the lead ship of the Takatsuki class, and this system was the first Japanese shipboard C4I system with the architecture of NTDS. On the second ship, Asakaze, the improved OYQ-2 Target Designation System (TDS) was on board. And the third ship, Sawakaze, introduced the new-generation combat direction system, OYQ-4.

The Tachikaze-class destroyers' weapon systems include one Mk 13 missile launcher for the Standard-1 MR surface-to-air missile, one Type 74 octuple launcher (Japanese version of the American Mark 16 GMLS) for the ASROC anti-submarine rockets, eight Boeing Harpoon anti-ship missile, two 20-mm Phalanx CIWS gun mounts, two Type 68 (Model HOS-301) triple 324 mm (12.8 in) torpedo tubes, and two 5-inch/54 caliber Mark 42 rapid-fire guns.

== Service history ==
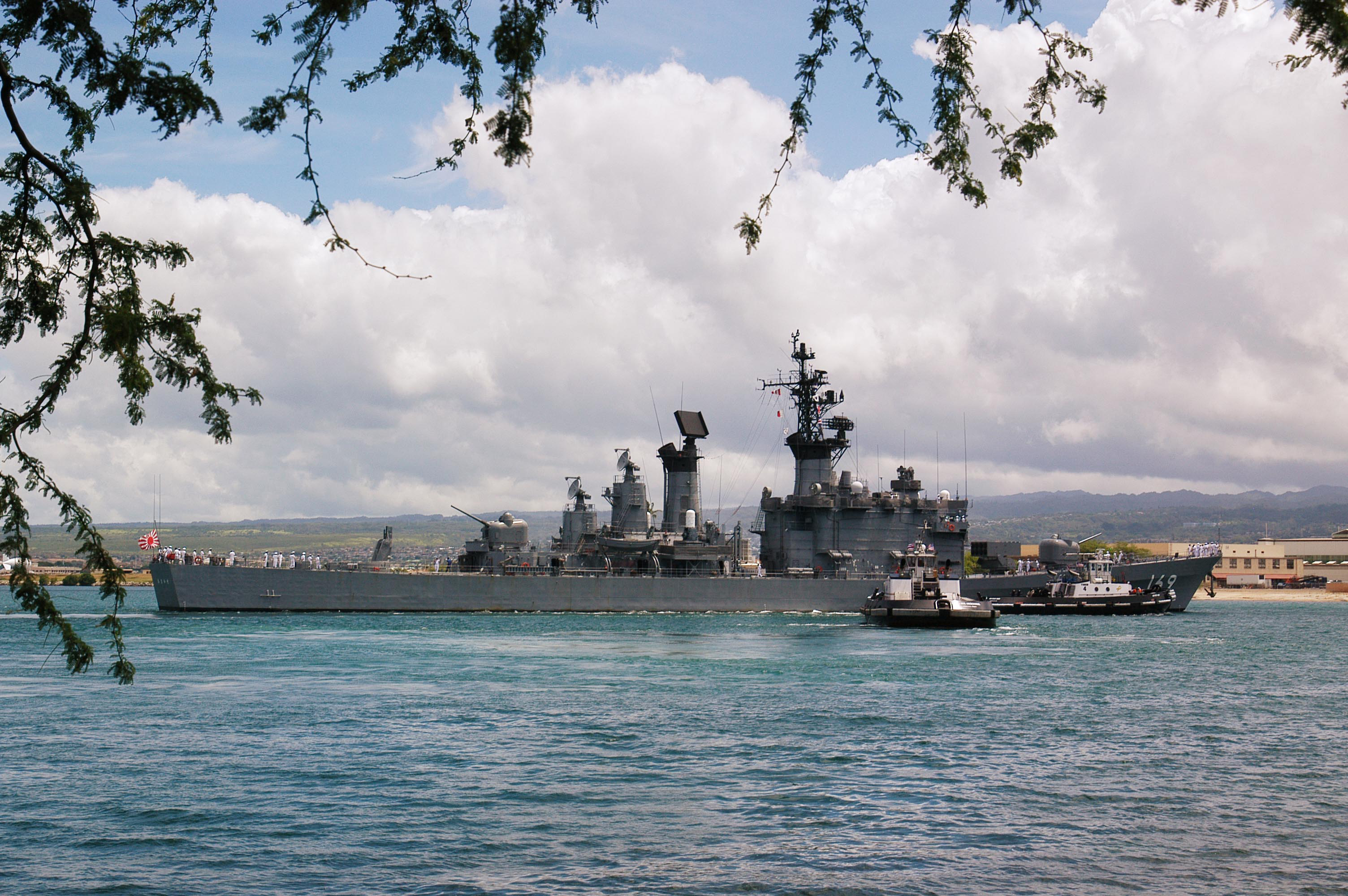
JDS Asakaze at Pearl Harbor

In 1998, Tachikaze was converted to be the flagship of the Fleet Escort Force. The aft 5-inch gun was replaced with a fleet command area. Tachikaze was decommissioned in 2007. Sawakaze then succeeded her in the flagship role.

The ships of the Tachikaze class were decommissioned beginning in 2007.

All three vessels of the Tachikaze class were named after destroyers of the Imperial Japanese Navy, with Tachikaze and Asakaze being lost to enemy action during the war.

== Ships in the class ==
Building no.	Pennant no.	Name	Laid down	Commissioned	Decommissioned	Home port
2308	DDG-168	Tachikaze	19 June 1973	26 March 1976	15 January 2007	Sasebo (1976–1995); Yokosuka (1995–2007)
2309	DDG-169	Asakaze	27 May 1976	27 March 1979	12 March 2008	Yokosuka (1979–1995); Sasebo (1995–2008)
2310	DDG-170	Sawakaze	14 September 1979	30 March 1983	25 June 2010	Sasebo (1983–2007); Yokosuka (2007–2010)

== See also ==
- List of destroyer classes

Equivalent destroyers of the same era

- Iroquois class
- Audace class
- Type 42
- Spruance class
- Sovremenny class
- Gangwon class
- Type 051
