= Haruna-class destroyer =

Class of Japanese warships

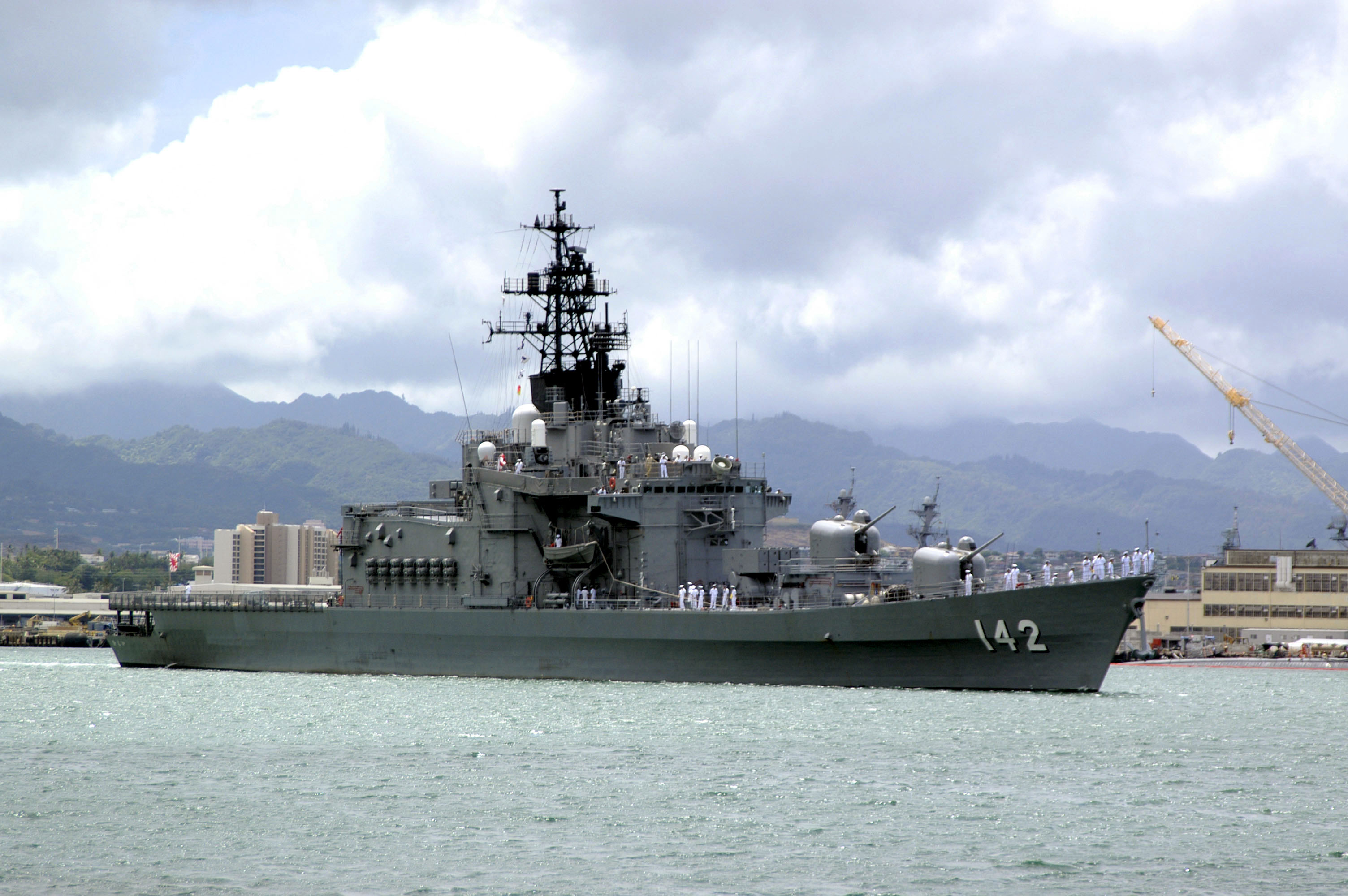
- Hiei (DDH-142) at Pearl Harbor in 2006

Class overview
- Name: Haruna class
- Builders: Ishikawajima-Harima HI (1); Mitsubishi Heavy Industries; Nagasaki Shipyard (1)
- Operators: Japan Maritime Self-Defense Force
- Succeeded by: Shirane class
- Built: 1970–1973
- In commission: 1973–2011
- Completed: 2
- Retired: 2

General characteristics
- Type: Destroyer
- Displacement: 4,950 long tons (5,029 t) standard; 6,900 long tons (7,011 t) full load
- Length: 153.1 m (502 ft)
- Beam: 17.5 m (57 ft 5 in)
- Draft: 5.2 m (17 ft 1 in)
- Propulsion: 2 boilers 850 psi (60 kg/cm², 5.9 MPa), 430 °C; 2 turbines; 2 shafts; 60,000 hp (45,000 kW)
- Speed: 31 knots (36 mph; 57 km/h)
- Complement: 370; 360 (DDH-141); 36 officers
- Armament: Sea Sparrow Mk.29 SAM octuple launcher; ASROC octuple launcher; 2 × 5"/54 caliber Mk.42 guns (Type 73); 2 × 20 mm Phalanx CIWS; 2 × Mark 32 triple torpedo tubes (Mk-46 torpedoes)
- Aircraft carried: 3 × SH-60J(K) anti-submarine helicopters

The Haruna-class destroyer was a destroyer class built for the Japan Maritime Self-Defense Force (JMSDF) in the early 1970s. These helicopter-carrying destroyers (DDH) were built around a large central hangar which housed up to three helicopters.

Originally, the Coastal Safety Force and its successor, the JMSDF, had intended to enable its fleet aviation operating capability. In 1960, the Defense Agency planned to construct one helicopter carrier (CVH) with the Second Defense Build-up Plan, but this project was shelved and finally cancelled because the JMSDF changed their plan to disperse its fleet aviation assets among destroyers, not concentrating them in a few helicopter carriers. The Japanese DDH was planned to be a hub with this dispersing fleet aviation concept with their logistics service capability for aircraft.

Initially, equipment of this class was similar to that of the Takatsuki-class DDA. All weapons, two 5-inch/54 caliber Mark 42 (Type 73) guns and one Type 74 octuple missile launcher (Japanese version of the American Mark 16 GMLS), were settled on the forecastle deck. But with the Fleet Rehabilitation and Modernization (FRAM) program in 1983 and 1984, Sea Sparrow launchers, Phalanx CIWS systems and chaff launchers were added on the superstructure. The upgrade program also added the Naval Tactical Data System (NTDS) with the OYQ-6/7 combat direction system.

The rear half of the superstructure was helicopter hangar, and the afterdeck was the helicopter deck with a beartrap system. To operate large HSS-2 ASW helicopters safely, the full length of the helicopter deck reached 50 meters.

== Ships in the class ==
Pennant no.	Name	Laid down	Launched	Commissioned	Decommissioned	Home port
DDH-141	Haruna	19 March 1970	1 February 1972	22 February 1973	18 March 2009	Maizuru
DDH-142	Hiei	8 March 1972	13 August 1973	27 November 1974	16 March 2011	Kure

== Gallery ==
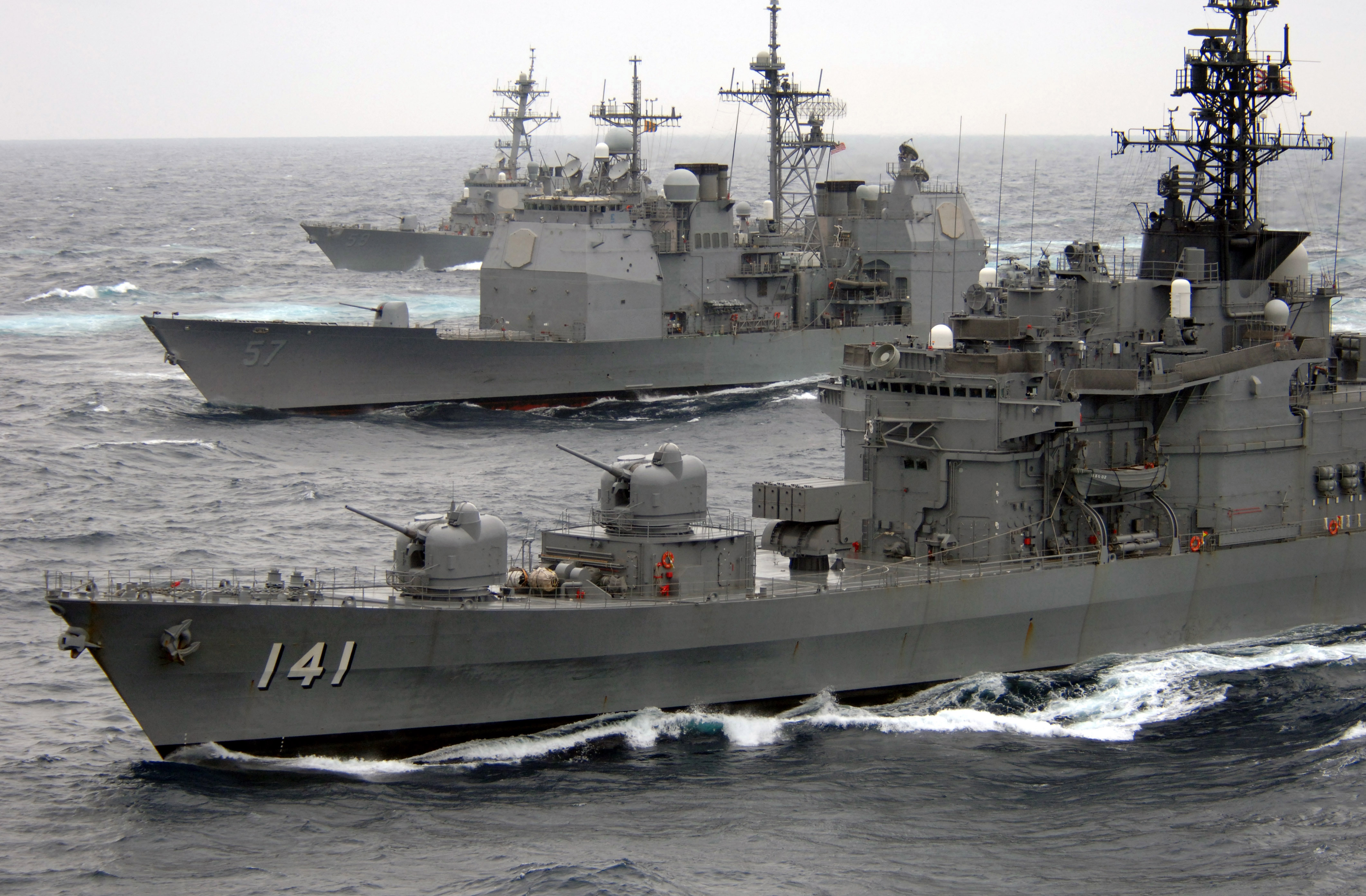
US Navy 070318-N-5961C-262 Japan Maritime Self Defense Force (JMSDF) ship JS Haruna (DDH-141), USS Lake Champlain (CG-57) and USS Russell (DDG-59) steam in formation during a photo exercise

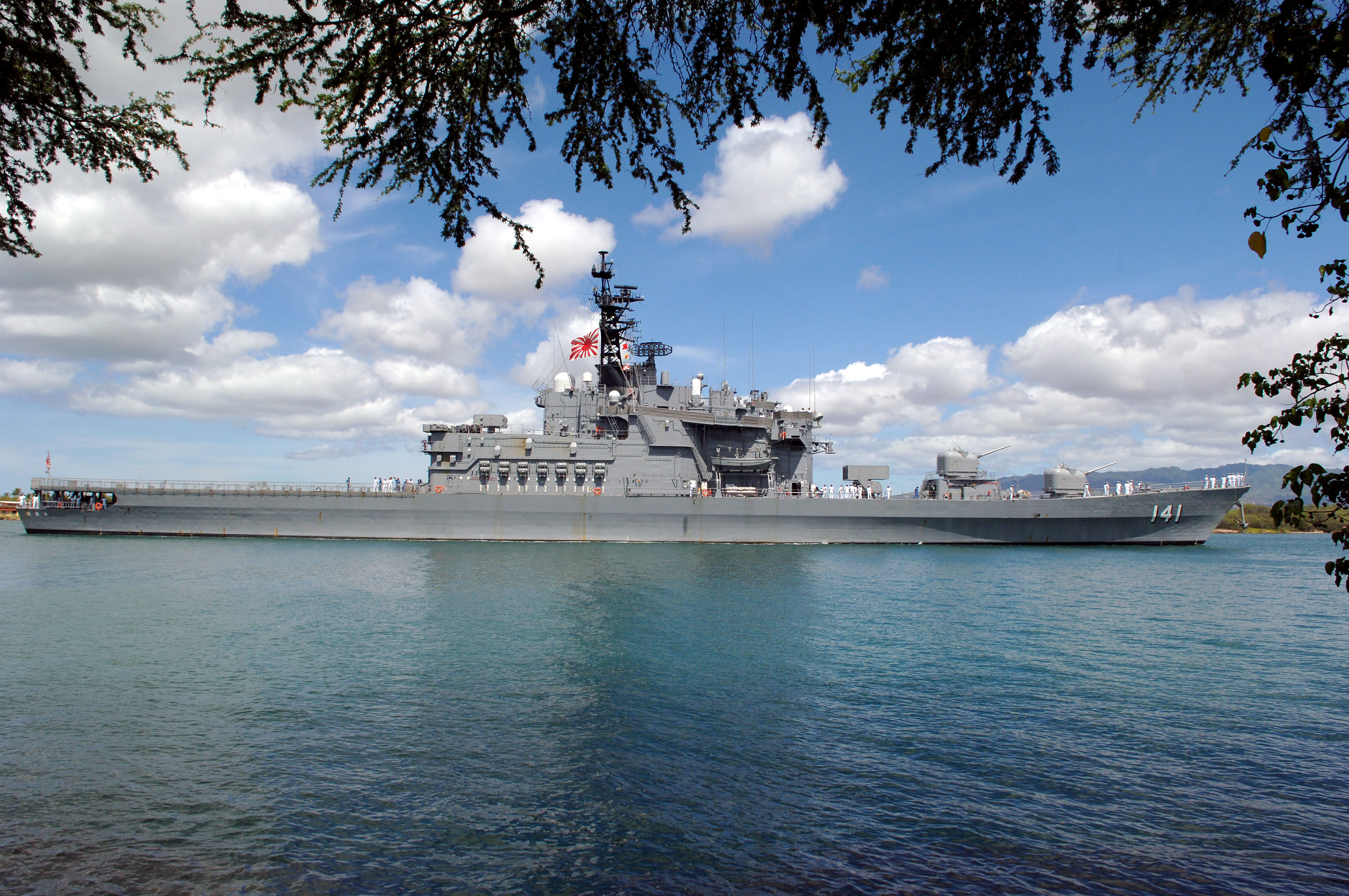
JMSDF ship Haruna (DDH-141)

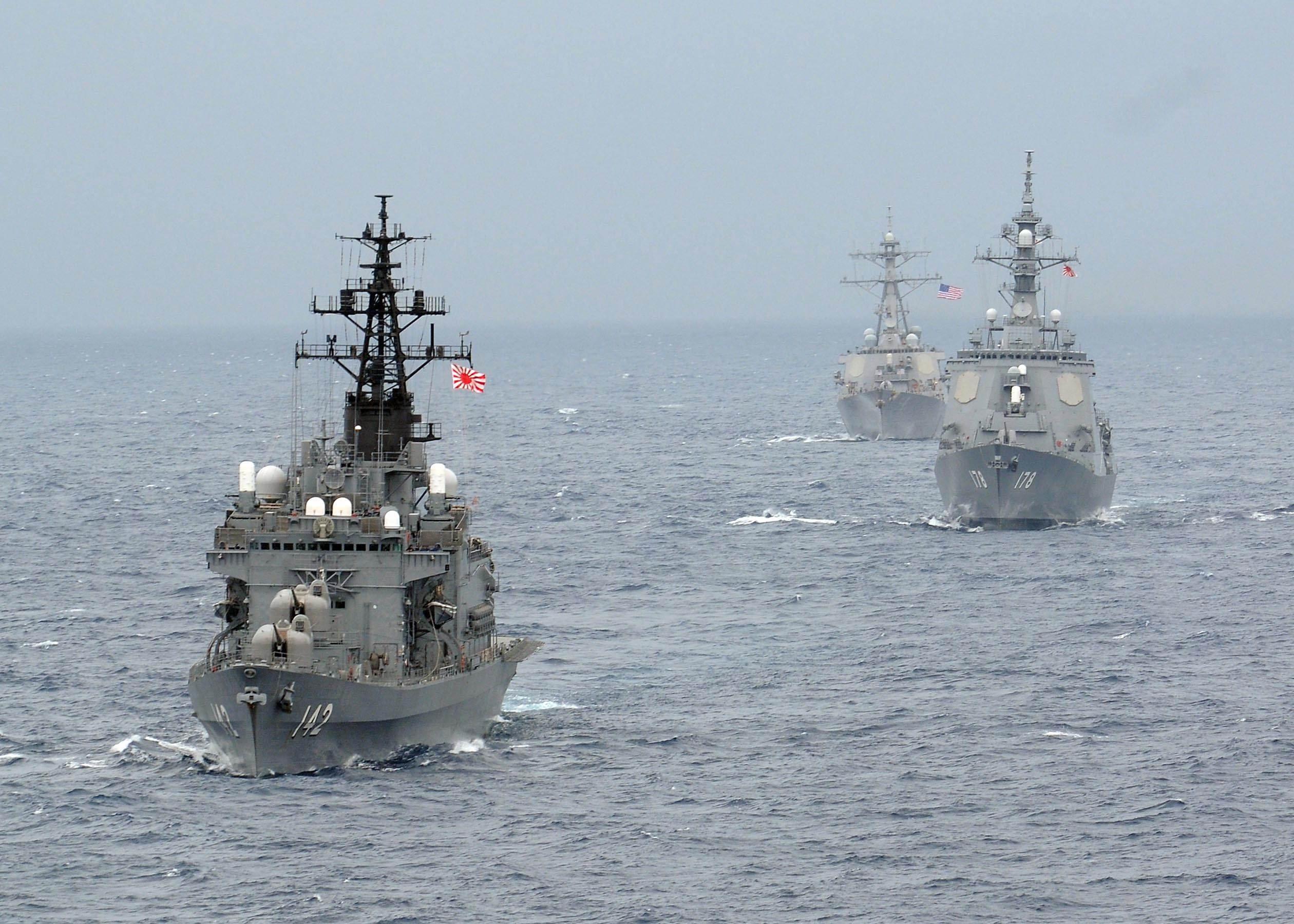
JS Hiei underway in the Pacific with JS Ashigara and USS Curtis Wilbur, November 2009

== See also ==
- List of destroyer classes

Equivalent helicopter carriers of the same era

- Vittorio Veneto class
- Jeanne d'Arc class
- Moskva class
