= 5-inch/54-caliber Mark 42 gun =

Mark 42 5"/54 Caliber Gun
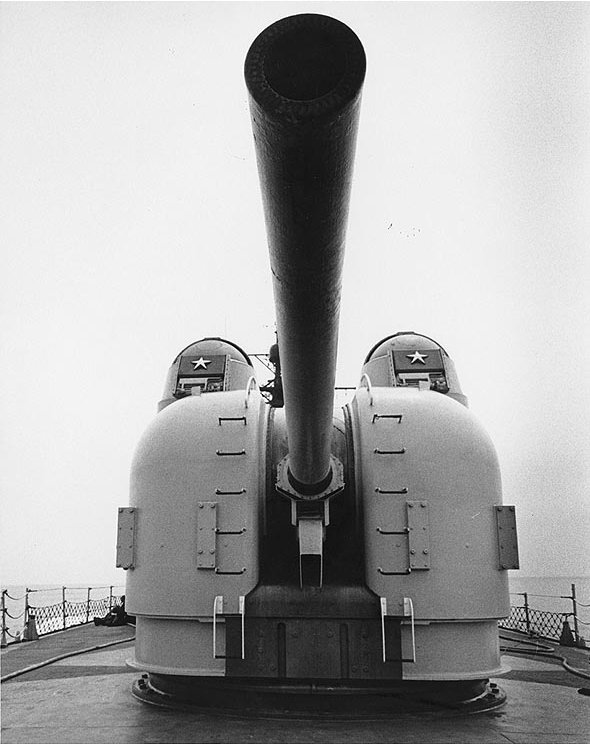
- 5 inch/54 Mark 42 on USS Turner Joy
- Type: Naval gun
- Place of origin: United States

Service history
- In service: 1953–present
- Used by: See users
- Wars: Vietnam War; Lebanese Civil War

Specifications
- Mass: 60.4 long tons (61.4 t)
- Length: 9.652 m (31 ft 8.0 in)
- Barrel length: 6.858 m (270.0 in); Rifling: 5.82 m (229 in)
- Shell: 127 x 835mm .R; Conventional: 31.75 kg (70.0 lb)
- Caliber: 5 inches (127.0 mm)
- Recoil: 18.75 inches (476.2 mm)
- Elevation: • -15°/+85° Maximum elevation rate: 25°/sec
- Traverse: • 150° from either side of centerline Maximum traversing rate: 40°/sec
- Rate of fire: As built/designed: 40 rounds per minute automatic Down-rated to 28 rounds per minute in 1968
- Muzzle velocity: 2,650 ft/s (807.7 m/s)
- Maximum firing range: • 25,909 yd (23,691.2 m) at +45° elevation • 51,600 ft (15,727.7 m) at +85° elevation

The Mark 42 5"/54 caliber gun (127mm) is a naval gun (naval artillery) mount used by the United States Navy and other countries. It consists of the Mark 18 gun and Mark 42 gun mount. United States naval gun terminology indicates the gun fires a projectile 5 inches in diameter, and the barrel is 54 calibers long (barrel length is 5" × 54 = 270" or 6.9 meters.) In the 1950s, a gun with more range and a faster rate of fire than the 5"/38 caliber gun used in World War II was needed; therefore, the gun was created concurrently with the 3"/70 Mark 26 gun for different usages. The 5"/54 Mk 42 is an automatic, dual-purpose (air / surface target) gun mount. It is usually controlled remotely from the Mk 68 Gun Fire Control System, or locally from the mount at the One Man Control (OMC) station.

The self-loading gun mount weighs about 60.4 long tons (61.4 t) including two drums under the mount holding 40 rounds of semi-fixed case type ammunition. The gun fires 31.75 kg (70.0 lb) projectiles at a velocity of 2,650 ft/s (807.7 m/s). Maximum rate of fire is 40 rounds per minute. Magazine capacity is 599 rounds per mount. The Mark 42 mount was originally equipped for two on-mount gunners, one surface and one antiaircraft, but the antiaircraft gunner position was scrapped later on when the increasing speed of naval aircraft made manual aiming of anti aircraft weapons impractical. The Mark 45 lightweight (22.1 long tons (22.5 t)) gun mount began replacing the Mk 42 mount in 1971 for easier maintenance and improved reliability in new naval construction for the United States Navy.

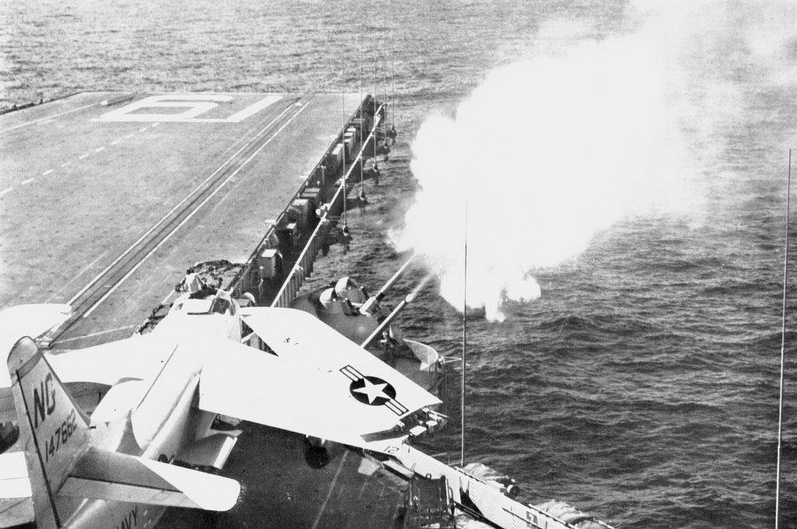
Two of the eight turrets of the carrier USS Ranger firing, in 1961.

== Users ==
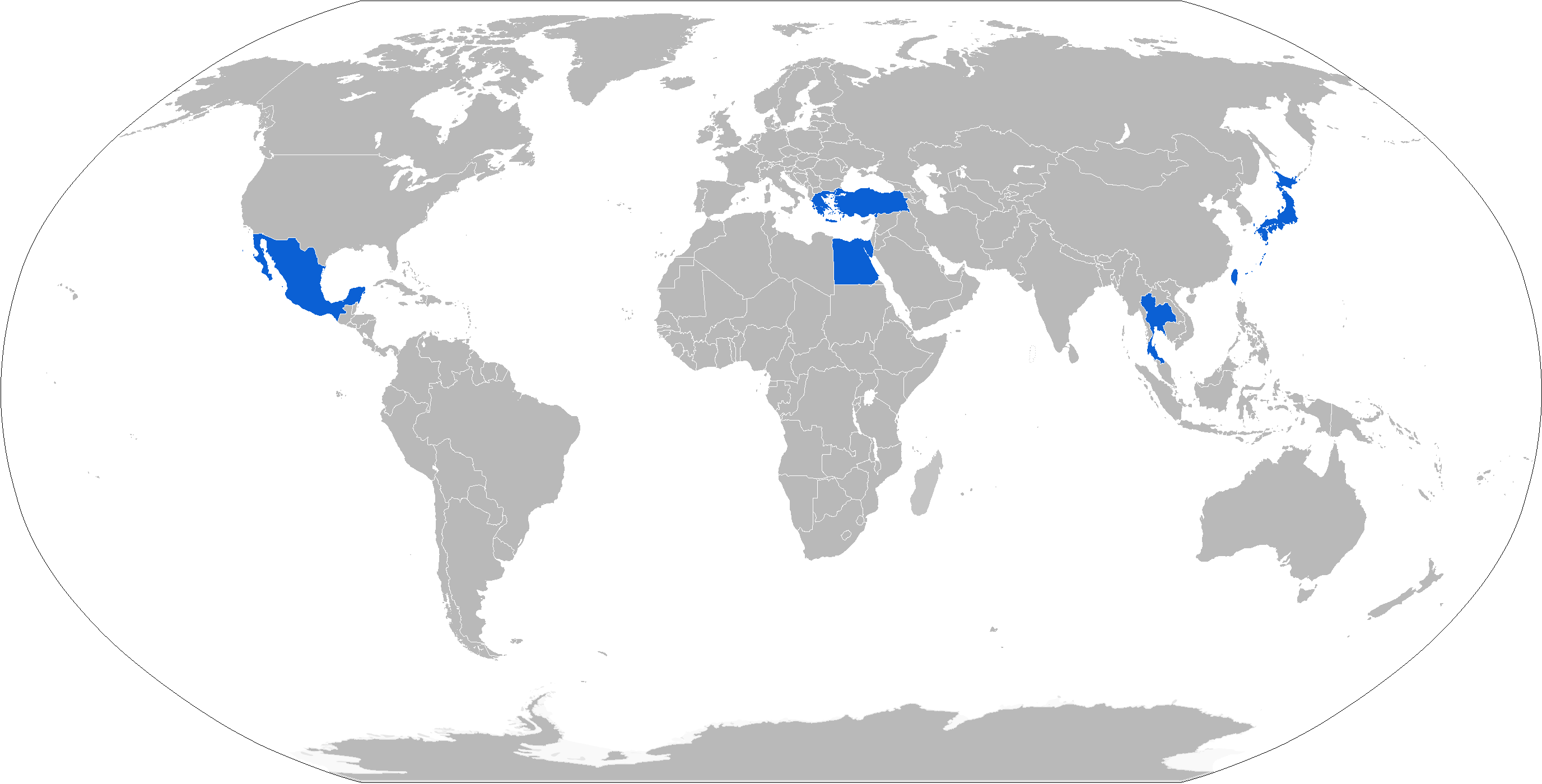
Map with current ship operators with 5-54 caliber Mark 42 guns

United States
United States Navy

- First used on USS Northampton
- Forrestal-class aircraft carrier (later removed during upgrade)
- Belknap-class cruiser and USS Truxtun
- Charles F. Adams-class destroyer
- Farragut-class destroyer
- Forrest Sherman-class destroyer
- Mitscher-class destroyer
- Knox-class frigate

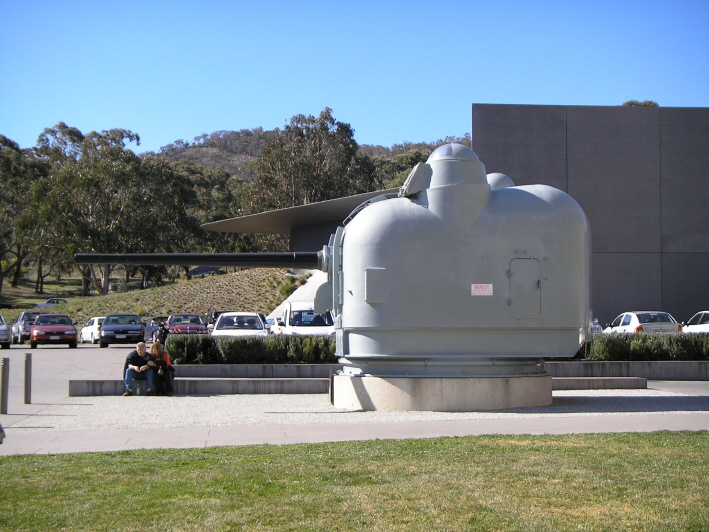
Side profile of the 5-inch gun from HMAS Brisbane

Australia
Royal Australian Navy

- Perth-class destroyer (modified Charles F. Adams class)

Egypt
Egyptian Navy

- Damiyat-class frigate (ex-USN Knox-class frigates)

Germany
German Navy

- Lütjens-class destroyer (modified Charles F. Adams class)

Greece
Hellenic Navy

- Ipiros-class frigate (ex-USN Knox-class frigates)
- Kimon-class destroyer (ex-USN Charles F. Adams-class destroyer)

Japan
Japan Maritime Self-Defense Force

- Tachikaze-class destroyer
- Hatakaze-class destroyer
- Haruna-class destroyer
- Takatsuki-class destroyer
- Shirane-class destroyer

Mexico
Mexican Navy

- Ignacio Allende-class frigate (ex-USN Knox-class frigates)

Spain
Spanish Navy

- Baleares-class frigate (modified Knox class)

Taiwan
Republic of China Navy

- Chih Yang-class frigate (modified ex-USN Knox class)

Thailand
Royal Thai Navy

- Phutthayotfa Chulalok-class frigate (ex-USN Knox-class frigates)

Turkey
Turkish Navy

- Muavenet-class frigate (ex-USN Knox-class frigates)

== See also ==
- 5"/38 caliber gun US predecessor
- 5"/54 caliber Mark 16 gun US predecessor
- 5"/54 caliber Mark 45 gun US successor
- QF 4.5 inch Mk I - V naval gun British equivalent

== Bibliography ==
- Bailey, Alfred D; Major USMC (January 1983). "The 16-incher: Big, Big Gun". United States Naval Institute Proceedings.
- Cooney, David M.; RADM USN (1980). Ships, Aircraft and Weapons of the United States Navy (NAVSO P-3564). U.S. Government Printing Office.
- Fairfield, A.P. (1921). Naval Ordnance. The Lord Baltimore Press.
- O'Neil, William D. III (March 1971). "Gun Systems? For Air Defense?". United States Naval Institute Proceedings.
