= JS Shimayuki =

Hatsuyuki-class destroyer

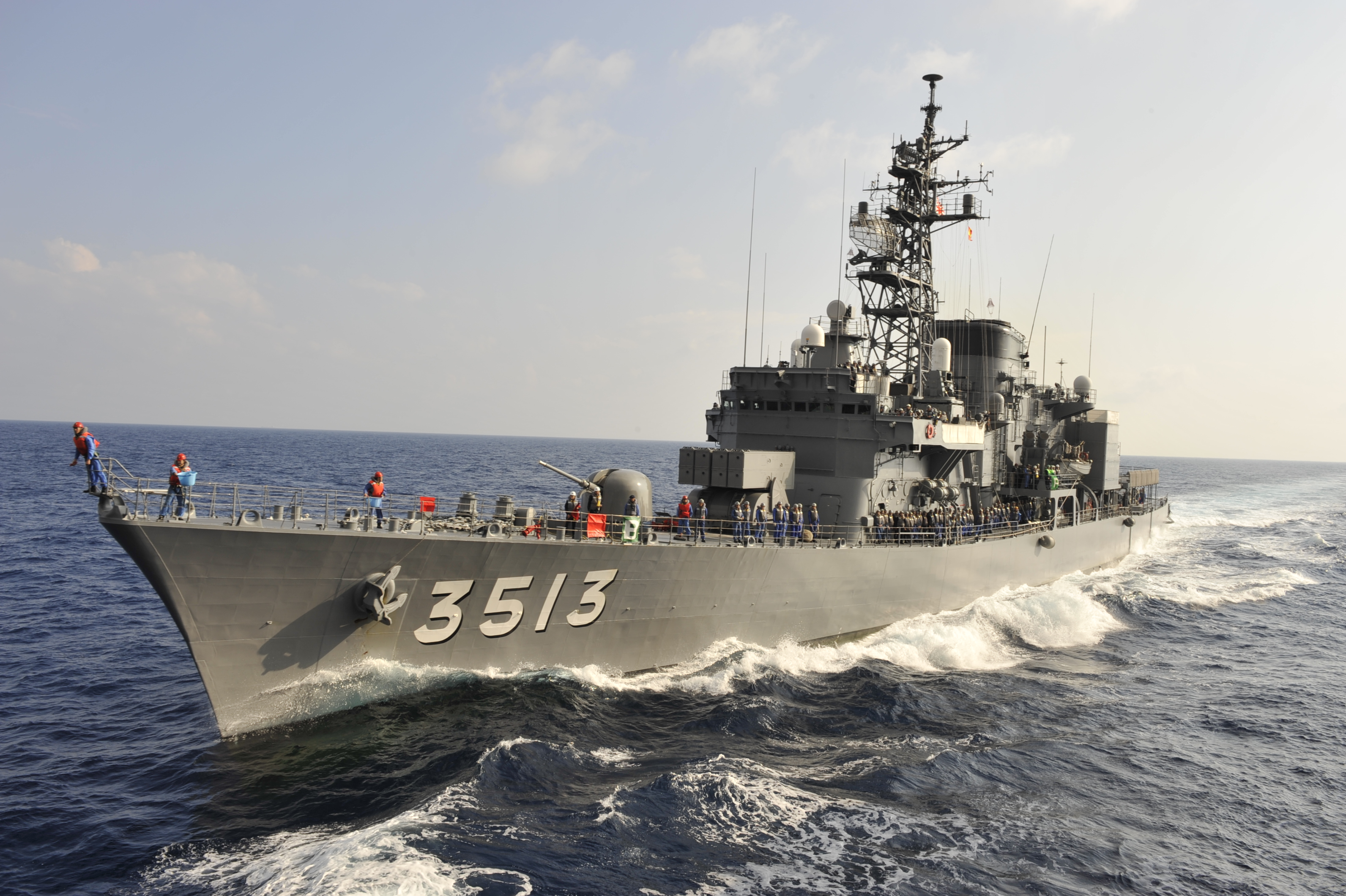
- JS Shimayuki (TV-3513) underway

History

Japan
- Name: Shimayuki; (しまゆき)
- Ordered: 1982
- Builder: Mitsubishi, Tokyo
- Laid down: 8 May 1984
- Launched: 29 January 1986
- Commissioned: 17 February 1987
- Decommissioned: 19 March 2021
- Home port: Kure
- Identification: MMSI number: 431999547; Hull number: DD-133
- Reclassified: TV-3513
- Status: Retired

General characteristics
- Class & type: Hatsuyuki-class destroyer
- Displacement: 2,950 tons standard, 4,000 tons hull load
- Length: 130 m (430 ft)
- Beam: 13.6 m (44 ft 7 in)
- Draft: 4.2 m (13 ft 9 in); 4.4 m (14 ft 5 in) (DD 129 to DD 132)
- Propulsion: 2 × KHI-RR TM3B gas turbines, 45,000 shp (34 MW); 2 × KHI-RR RM1C gas turbines, 9,900 shp (7.4 MW); 2 shafts, cp props
- Speed: 30 knots (56 km/h; 35 mph)
- Complement: 200
- Sensors & processing systems: OYQ-5 tactical data system; FCS-2 fire-control system; OPS-14 air search radar; OPS-18 surface search radar; OQS-4 hull sonar; OQR-1 TASS (in some ships)
- Electronic warfare & decoys: NOLR-6C intercept; OLT-3 jammer; Mark 36 SRBOC; Towed torpedo decoys
- Armament: 1 × OTO Melara 76 mm gun; 2 × 20 mm Phalanx CIWS; 2 × Harpoon SSM quad canisters; 1 × Sea Sparrow SAM octuple launcher; 1 × ASROC octuple launcher; 2 × triple 324 mm torpedo tubes
- Aircraft carried: 1 × HSS-2B or SH-60J helicopter
- Aviation facilities: Hangar and helipad

JS Shimayuki (DD-133/TV-3513) was a Hatsuyuki-class destroyer of the Japanese Maritime Self-Defense Force.

== Development and design ==
Adopting Japan's first all-gas turbine engine (COGOG), equipped with well-balanced weapons such as helicopters, C4I systems, and various missiles, it is inferior to western frigates at that time. It has been evaluated as a non-escort ship. Twelve ships were built as first-generation general-purpose escort vessels in the era of eight ships and eight aircraft, they supported the escort fleet for a long time, but now they are gradually retiring due to aging.

In addition, there are many changes to training ships, and up to three ships have been operated in the training fleet as Shimayuki-class training ships, but the decline has begun with the conversion of Hatakaze-class destroyers to training ships.

The core of the combat system is the OYQ-5 Tactical Data Processing System (TDPS), composed of one AN/UYK-20 computer and five OJ-194B workstations and capable of receiving data automatically from other ships via Link-14 (STANAG 5514).

This is the first destroyer class in the JMSDF equipped with the Sea Sparrow Improved basic point defense missile system. The IBPDMS of this class uses FCS-2 fire-control systems of Japanese make and one octuple launcher at the afterdeck. And in the JMSDF, OTO Melara 76 mm compact gun and Boeing Harpoon surface-to-surface missile are adopted from the ship of FY1977 including this class. Also, ships built in FY1979 and beyond carried Phalanx CIWS and were retrofitted to previous ships.

== Construction and career ==
Shimayuki was laid down on 8 May 1984 and launched on 29 January 1986 at Mitsubishi Heavy Industries Shipyard in Tokyo. She commissioned on 18 February 1987. In 1990, she participated in Exercise RIMPAC 1990.

On 22 March 2013, the first female captain of the Maritime Self-Defense Force as a training ship was appointed as the training ship Setoyuki. At around 20:50 on June 11, the same year, it was reported that there was a danger of collision when approaching a car carrier (26,651 tons) that was facing the Kanmon Straits (off the coast of Mutsure Island, Shimonoseki City) while sailing toward Sasebo Base.

== Gallery ==
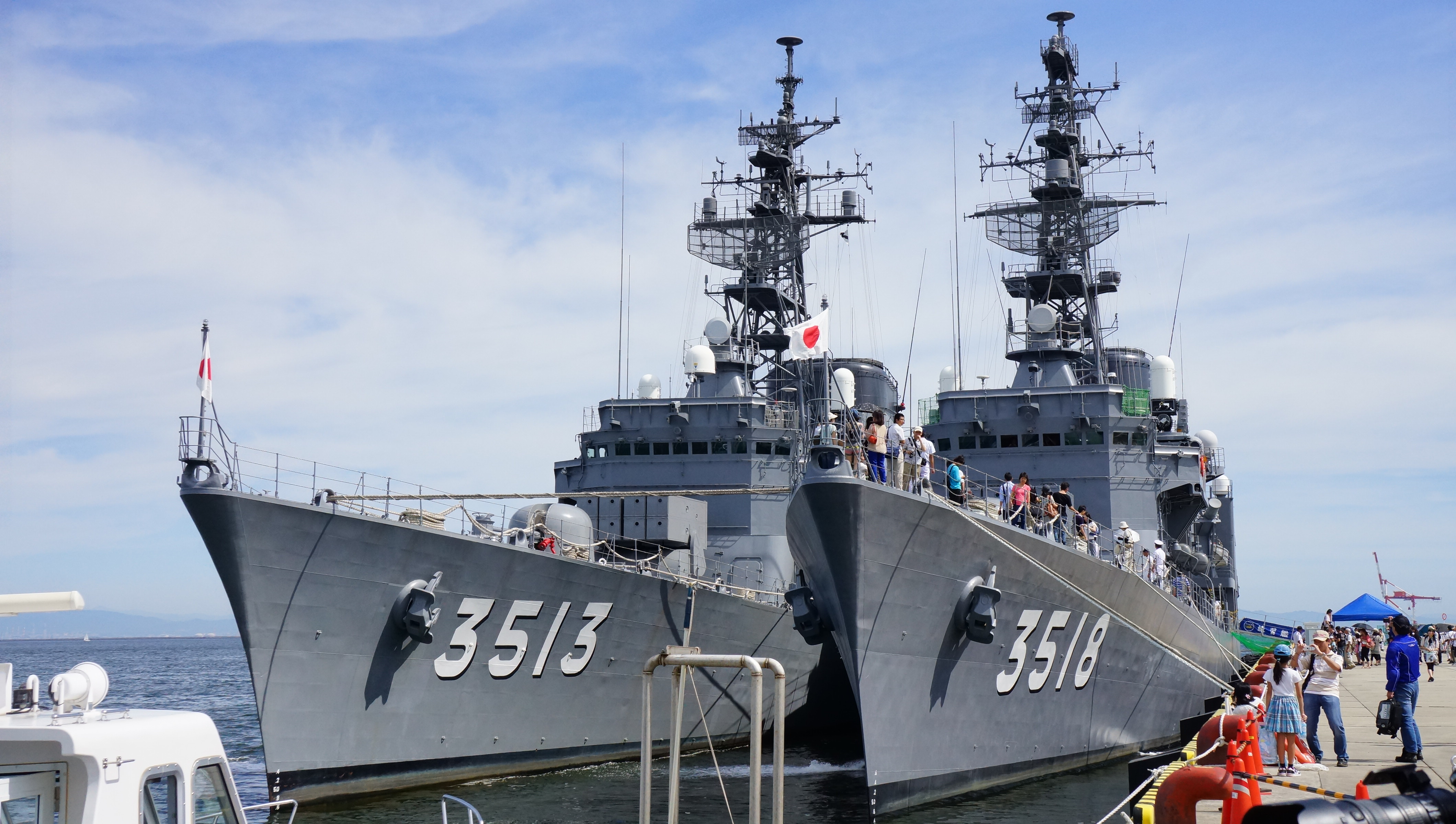
JS Shimayuki and JS Setoyuki at Hashin Base on 20 July 2013.

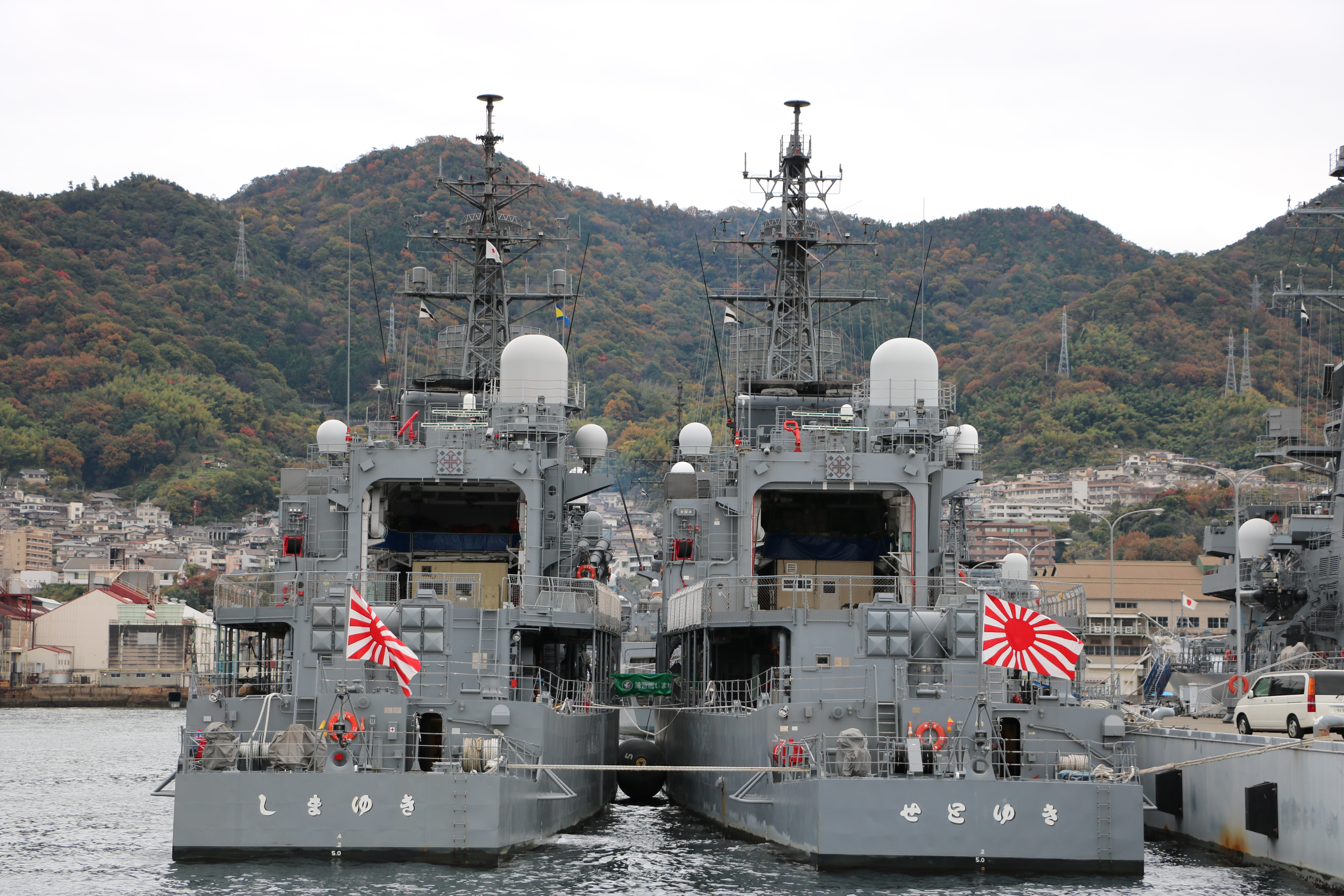
JS Shimayuki and JS Setoyuki at Kure on 23 November 2016.

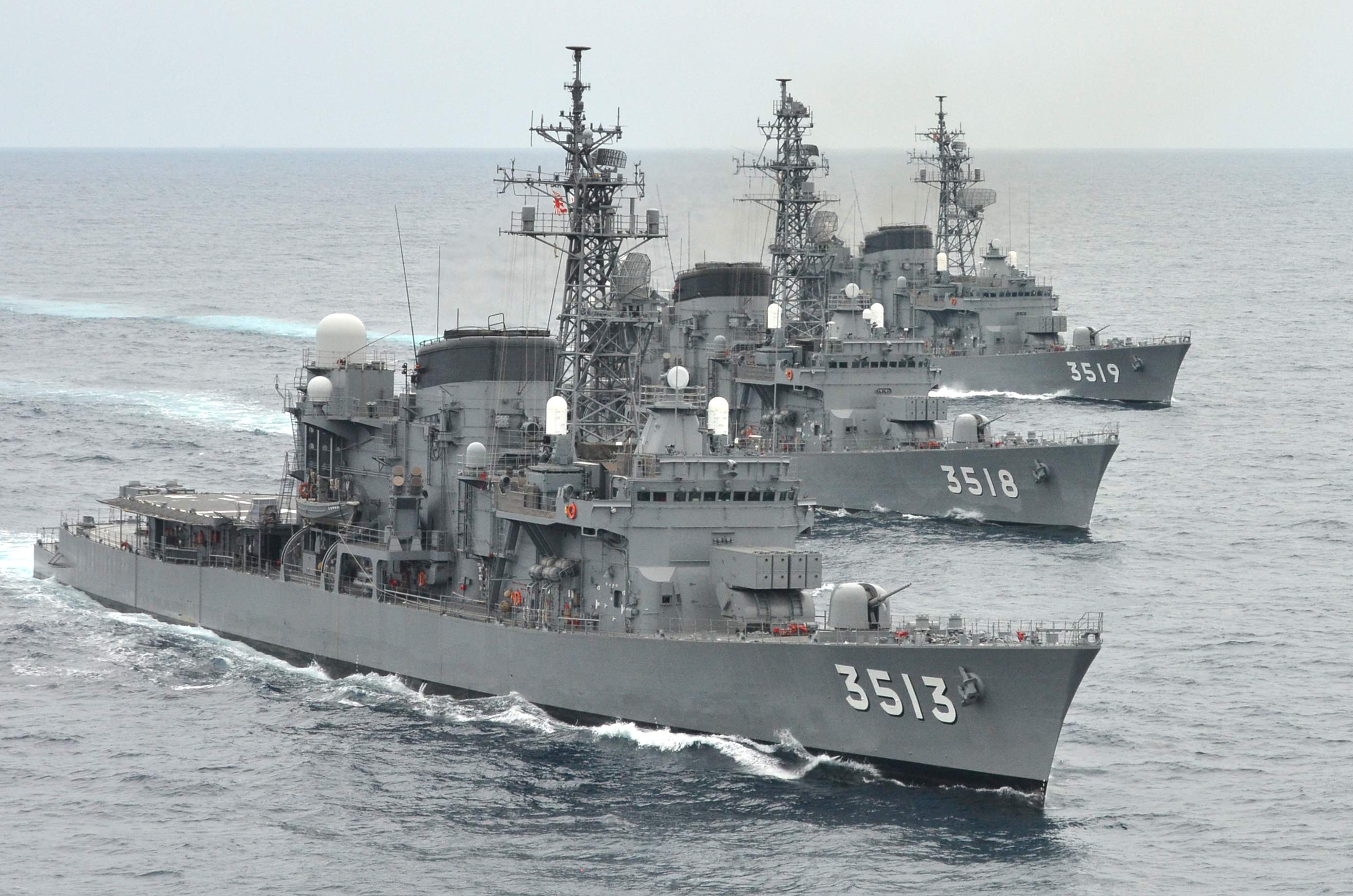
JS Shimayuki, Setoyuki and Yamayuki on 31 May 2019.

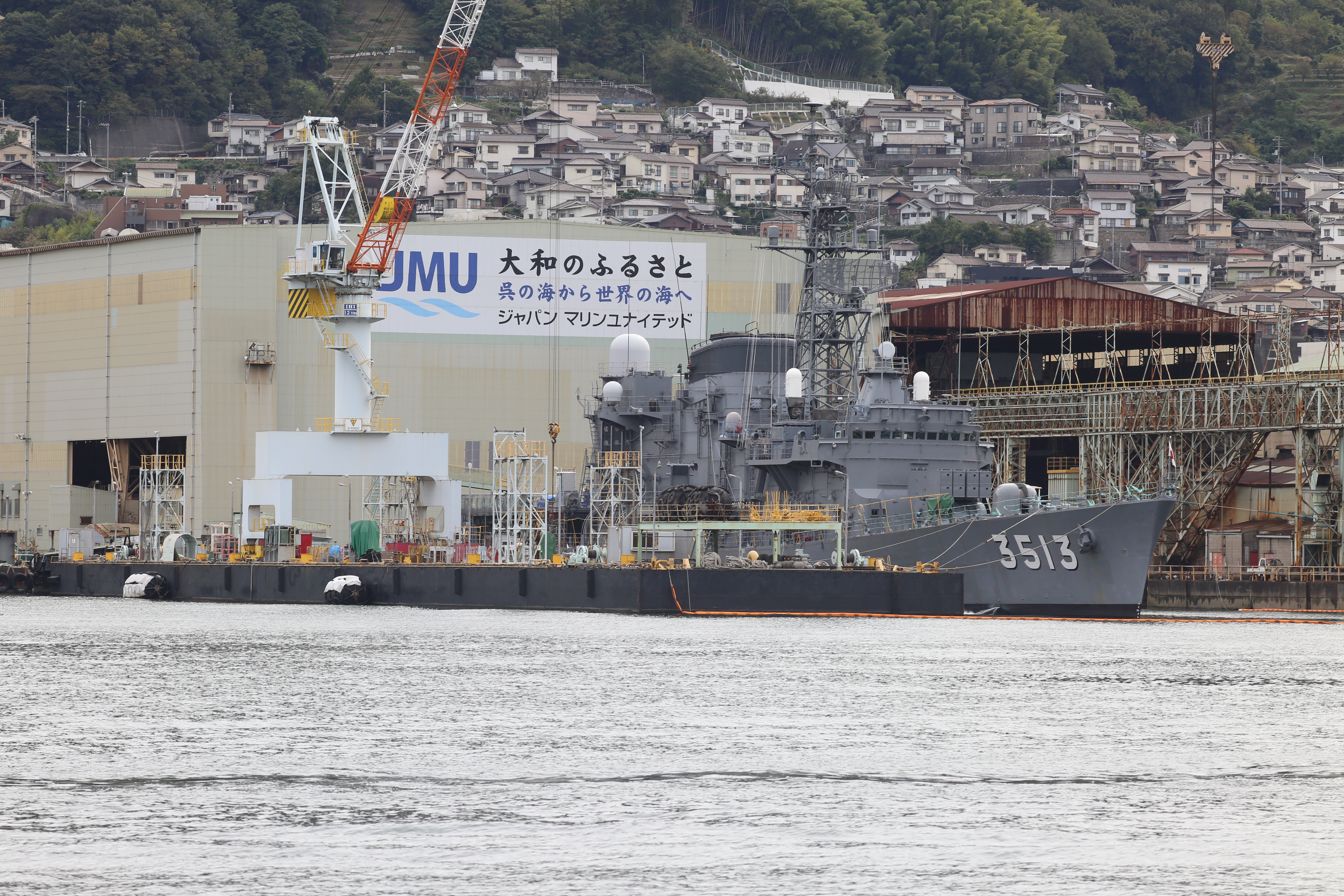
JS Shimayuki at Marine United Kure Shipyard on 20 October 2019.
