= JS Mineyuki =

Hatsuyuki-class destroyer

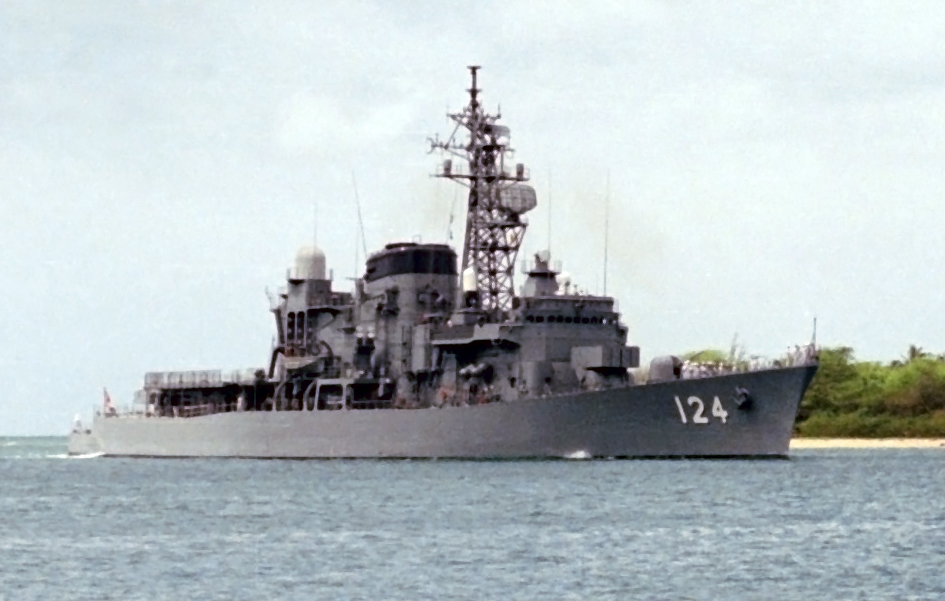
- JS Mineyuki entering Pearl Harbor on 1 June 1986

History

Japan
- Name: Mineyuki; (みねゆき)
- Ordered: 1979
- Builder: Mitsubishi, Tokyo
- Laid down: 7 May 1981
- Launched: 19 October 1982
- Commissioned: 26 January 1984
- Decommissioned: 7 March 2013
- Stricken: December 2013
- Home port: Maizuru
- Identification: MMSI number: 431999545; Pennant number: DD-124
- Fate: Scrapped

General characteristics
- Class & type: Hatsuyuki-class destroyer
- Displacement: 2,950 tons standard, 4,000 tons hull load
- Length: 130 m (430 ft)
- Beam: 13.6 m (44 ft 7 in)
- Draft: 4.2 m (13 ft 9 in); 4.4 m (14 ft 5 in) (DD 129 to DD 132)
- Propulsion: 2 × KHI-RR TM3B gas turbines, 45,000 shp (34 MW); 2 × KHI-RR RM1C gas turbines, 9,900 shp (7.4 MW); 2 shafts, cp props
- Speed: 30 knots (35 mph; 56 km/h)
- Complement: 200
- Sensors & processing systems: OYQ-5 tactical data system; FCS-2 fire-control system; OPS-14 air search radar; OPS-18 surface search radar; OQS-4 hull sonar; OQR-1 TASS (in some ships)
- Electronic warfare & decoys: NOLR-6C intercept; OLT-3 jammer; Mark 36 SRBOC; Towed torpedo decoys
- Armament: 1 × OTO Melara 76 mm gun; 2 × 20 mm Phalanx CIWS; 2 × Harpoon SSM quad canisters; 1 × Sea Sparrow SAM octuple launcher; 1 × ASROC octuple launcher; 2 × triple 324 mm torpedo tubes
- Aircraft carried: 1 × HSS-2B or SH-60J helicopter
- Aviation facilities: hangar and helipad

JS Mineyuki (DD-124) was a Hatsuyuki-class destroyer of the Japanese Maritime Self-Defense Force.

== Development and design ==
Adopting Japan's first all-gas turbine engine (COGOG), equipped with well-balanced weapons such as helicopters, C4I systems, and various missiles, it is inferior to Western frigate at that time. It has been evaluated as a non-escort ship. Twelve ships were built as first-generation general-purpose escort vessels in the era of eight ships and eight aircraft, they supported the escort fleet for a long time, but now they are gradually retiring due to aging.

In addition, there are many changes to training ships, and up to three ships have been operated in the training fleet as Shimayuki-class training ships, but the decline has begun with the conversion of Hatakaze-class destroyers to training ships.

The core of the combat system is the OYQ-5 Tactical Data Processing System (TDPS), composed of one AN/UYK-20 computer and five OJ-194B workstations and capable of receiving data automatically from other ships via Link-14 (STANAG 5514).

This is the first destroyer class in the JMSDF equipped with the Sea Sparrow Improved basic point defense missile system. The IBPDMS of this class uses FCS-2 fire-control systems of Japanese make and one octuple launcher at the afterdeck. And in the JMSDF, OTO Melara 76 mm compact gun and Boeing Harpoon surface-to-surface missile are adopted from the ship of FY1977 including this class. Also, ships built in FY1979 and beyond carried Phalanx CIWS and were retrofitted to previous ships.

== Construction and career ==
She was laid down on 7 May 1981 and launched on 19 October 1982 at Mitsubishi Heavy Industries Shipyard in Tokyo. She commissioned on 26 January 1984. The 42nd escort corps, which was newly formed under the escort group, was incorporated with JS Hamayuki and deployed to Sasebo. Since this ship, it has been equipped with a high-performance 20mm machine gun (CIWS) since it was commissioned.

In 1986, participated in the Exercise RIMPAC (RIMPAC).

On January 25, 1989, she was transferred to Maizuru as a ship under the direct control of the 3rd Escort Group. From June 16 to September 6 of the same year, she participated in the US dispatch training with the escort vessels JS Haruna and JS Shimakaze.

On March 6, 1990, with the transfer of JS Hamayuki to Maizuru, the 42nd Escort Corps was reorganized and incorporated under the 3rd Escort Corps group.

In 1990, participated in the Exercise RIMPAC (RIMPAC). Participated in the Indonesian 50th Anniversary International Fleet Review Ceremony held in Jakarta, Indonesia with JS Hamayuki from August 16 to 20, 1995.

On March 24, 1997, the 42nd Escort Corps was renamed the 3rd Escort Corps due to the revision of the unit number. In the same year, a disaster was dispatched for the Nakhodka heavy oil spill accident.

From March 15 to April 28, 2002, she was engaged in the escort mission of the amphibious assault ship JS Ōsumi equipped with the personnel and vehicles of the Ground Self-Defense Force participating in the PKO of East Timor.

On August 16, the same year, he was transferred to the 24th Maizuru District Force. Dispatched to the Niigata Chuetsu-oki Earthquake that occurred on July 16, 2007.

On March 26, 2008, the 24th escort was renamed to the 14th escort due to a major reorganization of the Self-Defense Fleet, and was reorganized under the escort fleet.

On March 12, 2012, a joint suspicious ship coping training was conducted with the Japan Coast Guard in Wakasa Bay. The breakdown of the participating units is the missile boat JS Hayabusa and one SH-60J / K patrol helicopter from the Maritime Self-Defense Force, and the patrol boat Hotaka and Asa from the Japan Coast Guard. Patrol boat Komayuki and one Agusta AW139 helicopter.

In January 2013, she was inspected by a person in charge of the Japan Coast Guard.

She was retired for three years until March 2016, when a new Kunigami-class patrol vessel was put into service in order to respond to Chinese vessels that repeatedly invaded the territorial waters of the Senkaku Islands after the nationalization of the Senkaku Islands. This is because a plan to divert the Hatsuyuki type as a patrol boat of the Japan Coast Guard came up. However, the plan has been returned to a blank slate.

On March 7, 2013, she was removed from the register due to the commissioning of JS Teruzuki. The total itinerary during commissioning was about 730,000 miles and the total voyage time was about 65,000 hours. The final placement belonged to the 14th escort fleet of the escort fleet, and the fixed port was Maizuru.

== Gallery ==
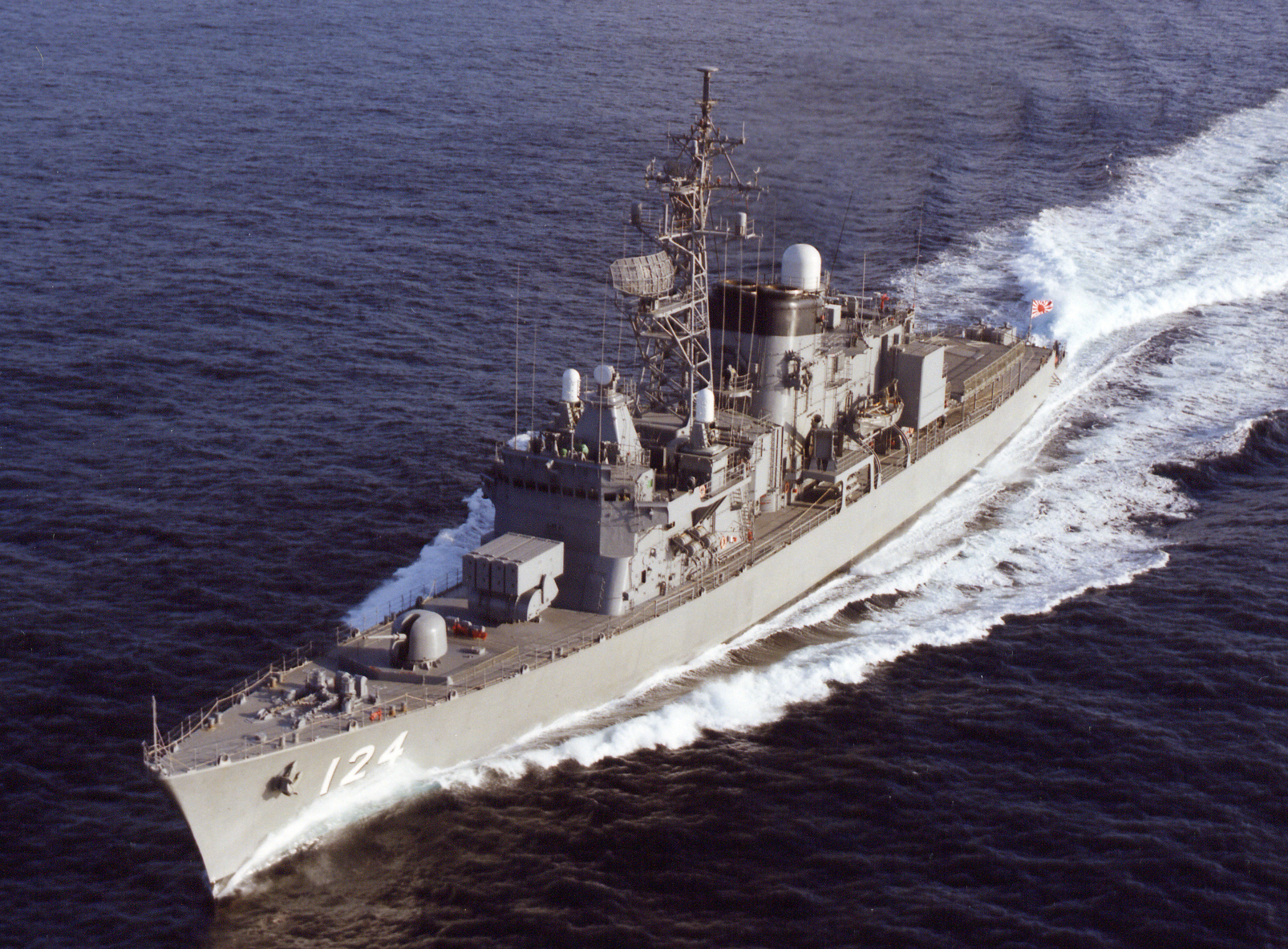
Mineyuki underway, date unknown.

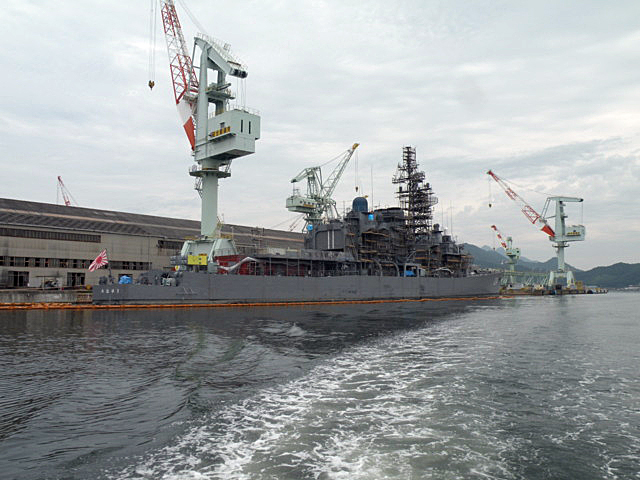
JS Mineyuki under repair at Maizuru on 18 July 2009.

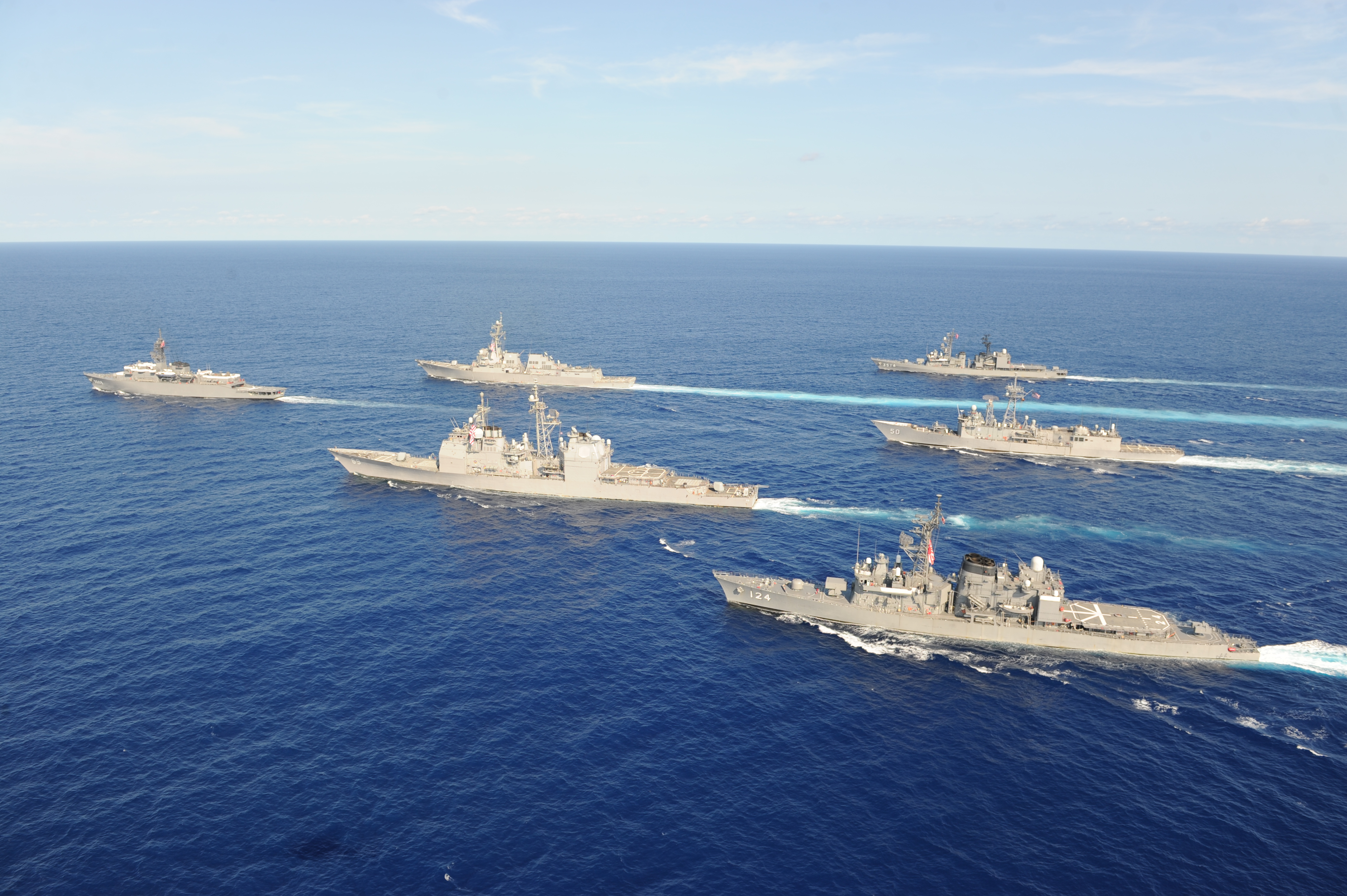
JS Mineyuki with USS Chosin, USS Nitze, USS Taylor, and JS Asagiri with JS Kashima leading the way, 31 July 2011.

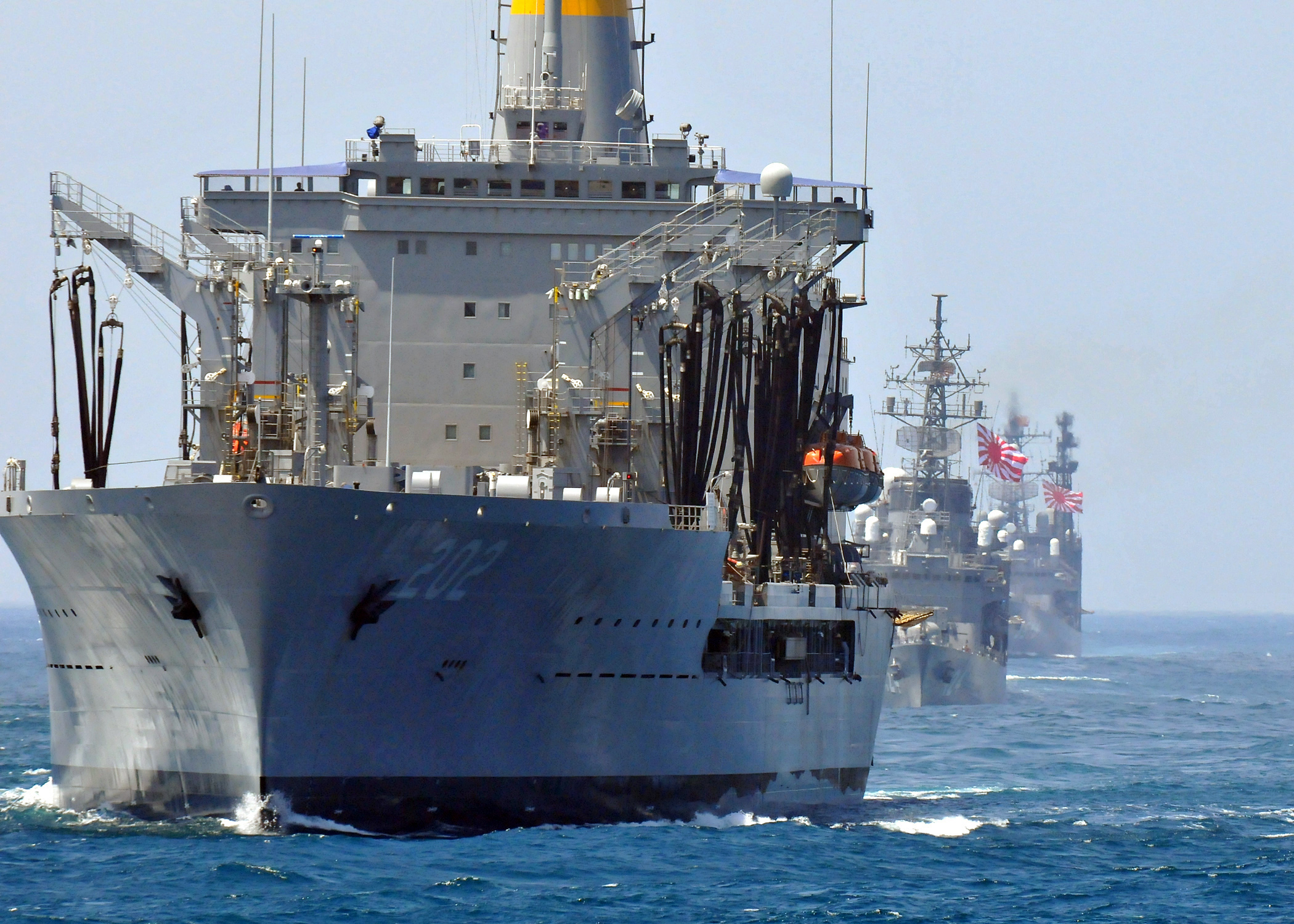
USNS Yukon leading JS Mineyuki and JS Asagiri on 26 June 2011.

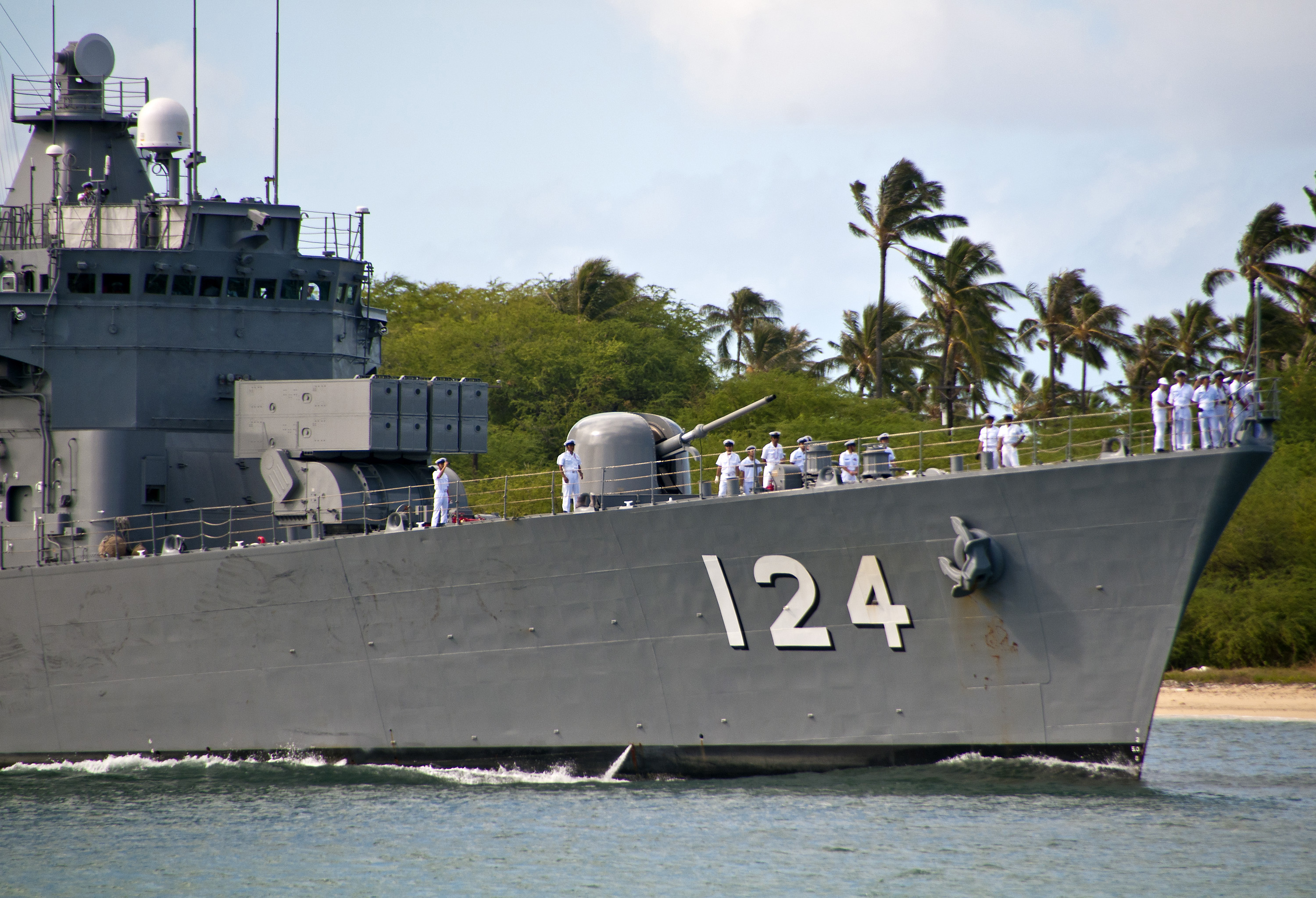
JS Mineyuki entering Pearl Harbor on 10 October 2011.

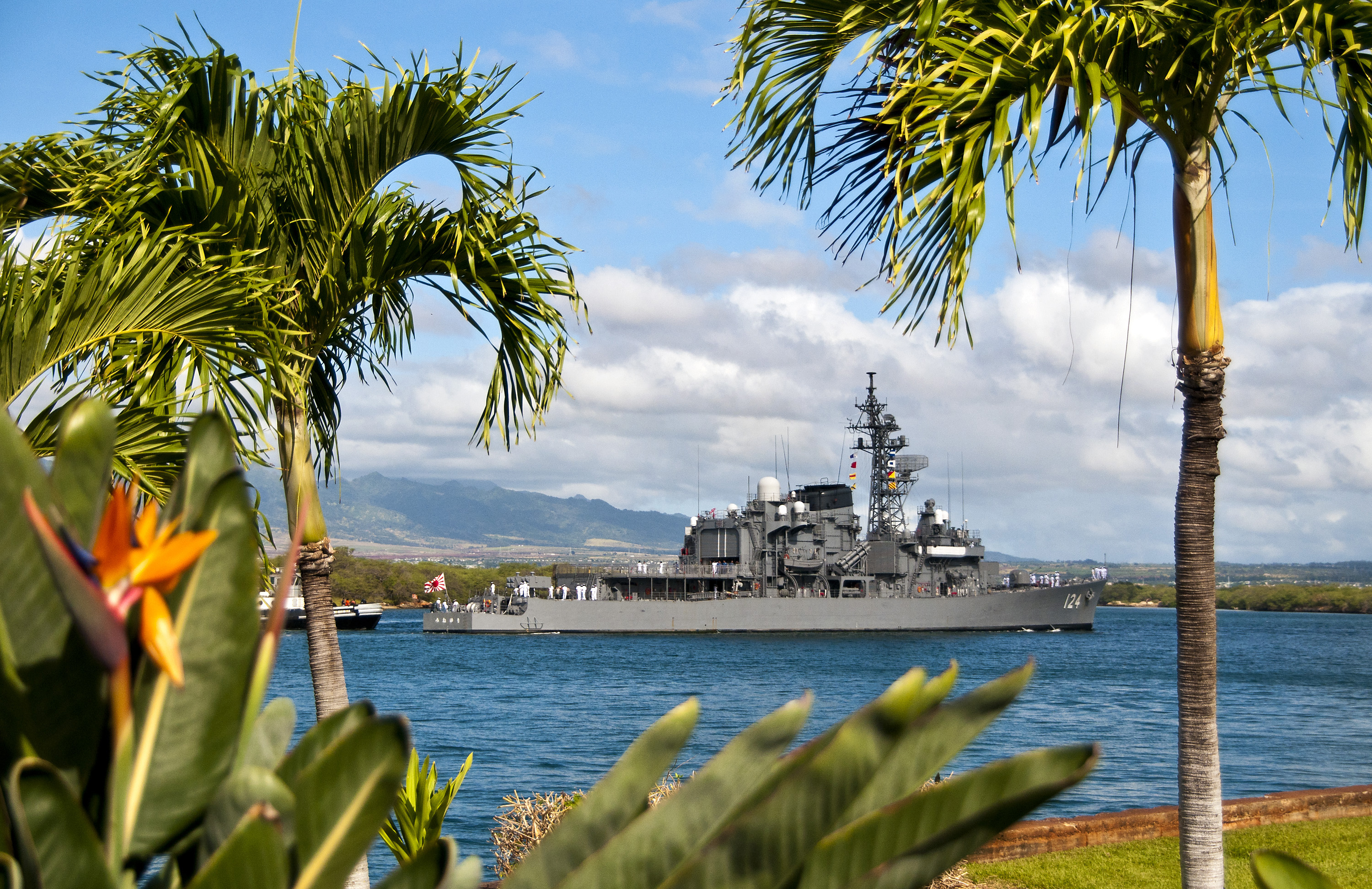
JS Mineyuki entering Pearl Harbor on 10 October 2011.

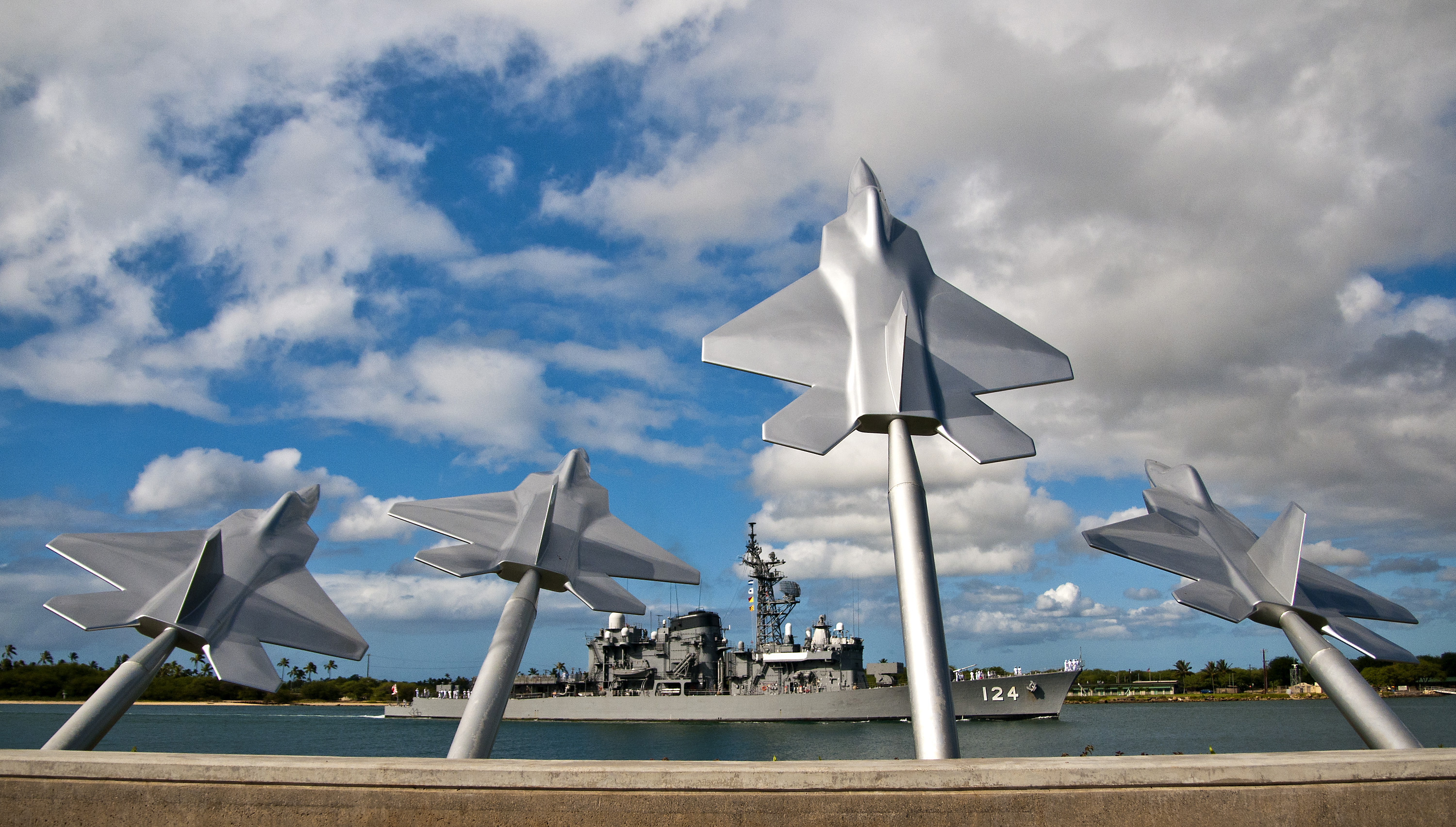
JS Mineyuki entering Pearl Harbor on 10 October 2011.

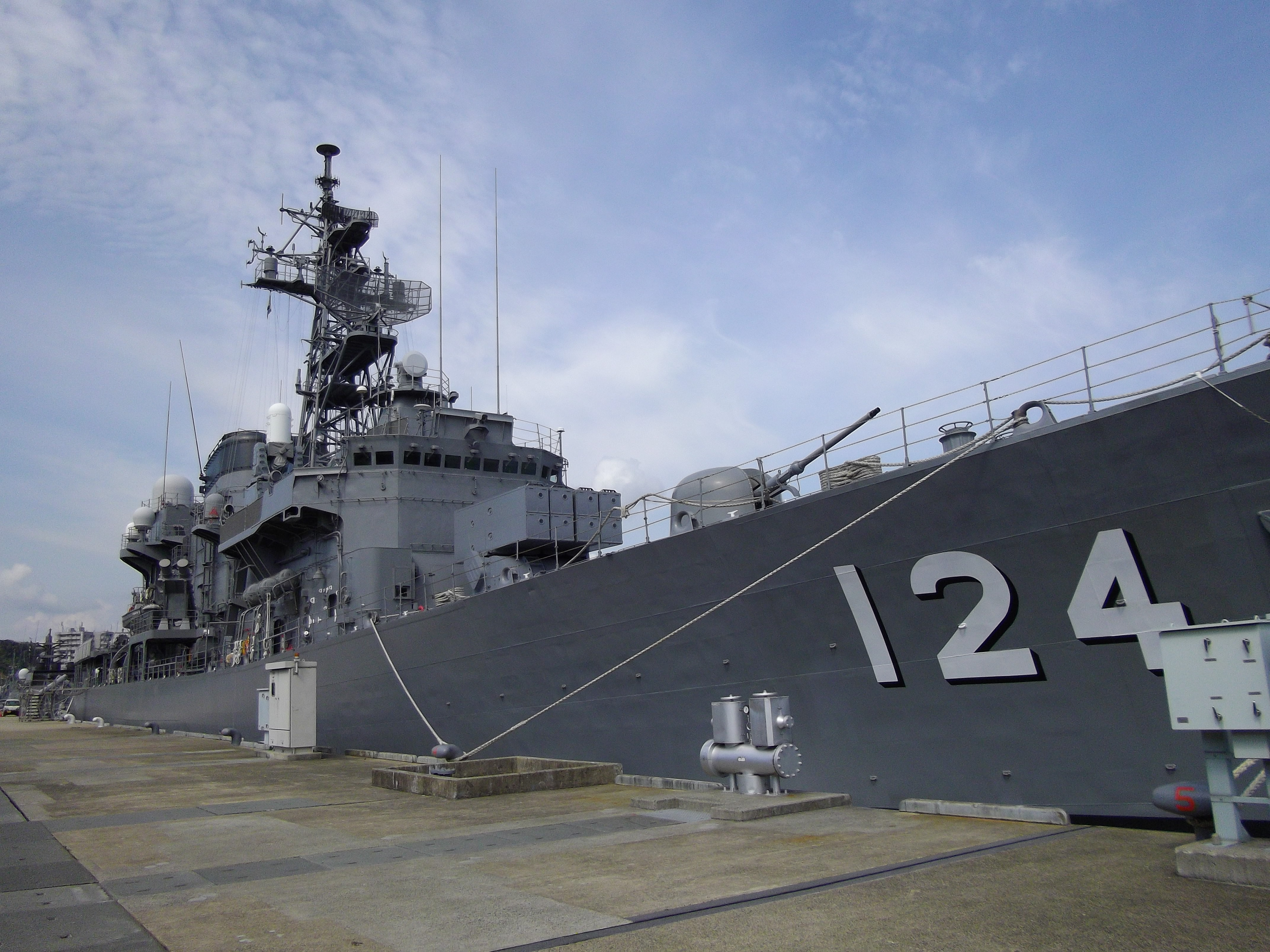
JS Mineyuki in Maizuru, 2012.
