= Hatsuyuki-class destroyer =

Destroyer class in the Japanese Maritime Self-Defense Forces

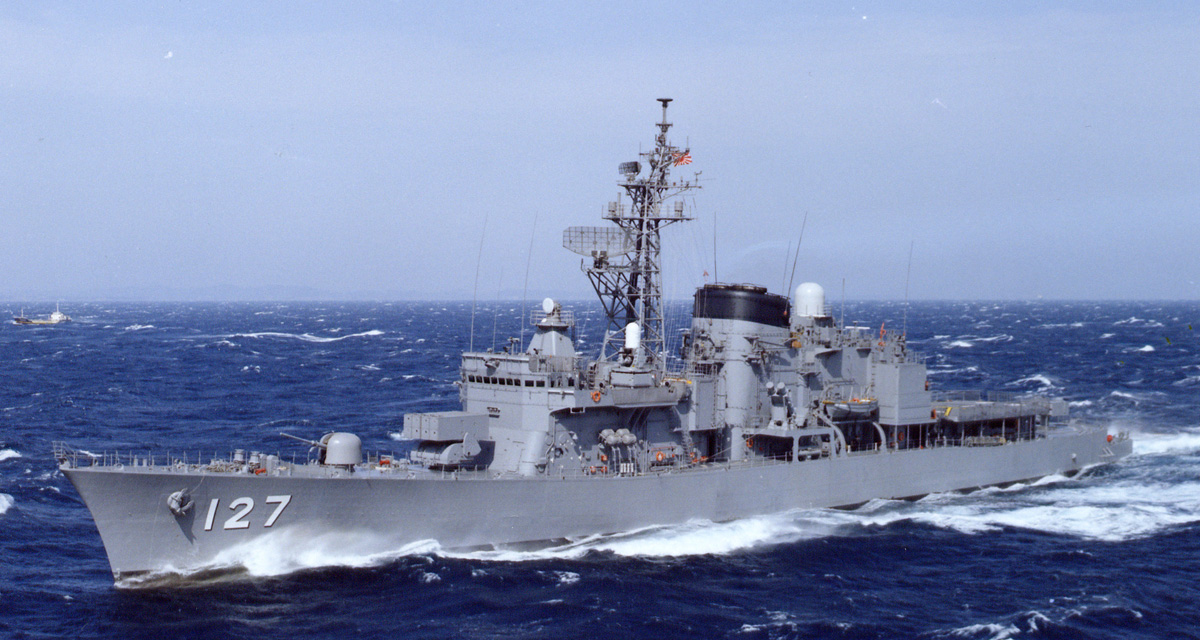
- Isoyuki (DD-127)

Class overview
- Name: Hatsuyuki class
- Builders: Ishikawajima-Harima HI (3); Sumitomo Heavy Industries (3); Hitachi Zosen Corporation (2); Mitsubishi Heavy Industries (2); Mitsui Eng. & Shipbuilding (2)
- Operators: Japan Maritime Self-Defense Force
- Preceded by: Yamagumo class
- Succeeded by: Asagiri class
- Built: 1979–1986
- In commission: 1980–2021
- Completed: 12
- Retired: 12

General characteristics
- Type: General-purpose destroyer (DD)
- Displacement: 2,950 tons standard, 4,000 tons hull load
- Length: 130 m (430 ft)
- Beam: 13.6 m (44 ft 7 in)
- Draft: 4.2 m (13 ft 9 in); 4.4 m (14 ft 5 in) (DD 129 to DD 132)
- Propulsion: 2 × KHI-RR TM3B gas turbines, 45,000 shp (34 MW); 2 × KHI-RR RM1C gas turbines, 9,900 shp (7.4 MW); 2 shafts, variable-pitch propellers
- Speed: 30 knots (35 mph; 56 km/h)
- Complement: 200
- Sensors & processing systems: OYQ-5 tactical data system; FCS-2 fire-control system; OPS-14 air search radar; OPS-18 surface search radar; OQS-4 hull sonar; OQR-1 TASS (in some ships)
- Electronic warfare & decoys: NOLR-6C intercept; OLT-3 jammer; Mark 36 SRBOC; Towed torpedo decoys
- Armament: 1 × OTO Melara 76 mm gun; 2 × 20 mm Phalanx CIWS; 2 × Harpoon SSM quad canisters; 1 × Sea Sparrow SAM octuple launcher; 1 × ASROC octuple launcher; 2 × triple 324 mm torpedo tubes
- Aircraft carried: 1 × HSS-2B or SH-60J helicopter

The Hatsuyuki-class destroyer (はつゆき型護衛艦, Hatsuyuki-gata-goei-kan) is a class of destroyer, serving with the Japan Maritime Self-Defense Force (JMSDF). It was the first class of first generation of general-purpose destroyers of the JMSDF.

== Background ==
Destroyers of the JMSDF had been divided into two series, anti-aircraft gunfire-oriented destroyers (DDA) and ASW-oriented destroyers (DDK). However, in the 1970s, a drastic review of the fleet became necessary due to the enhancement of the Soviet submarine fleet and the reinforcement of the anti-ship missiles. After consideration by Operations research, the concept of eight ships / eight helicopters was adopted as a new fleet organization. In this concept, each flotillas would be composed of one helicopter destroyer (DDH), five general-purpose destroyers (DD), and two guided-missile destroyers (DDG).

General-purpose destroyers (汎用護衛艦, Hanyou-goei-kan) are a new type of destroyers for this concept, combining the anti-aircraft capability of the DDA and the anti-submarine capability of the DDK, while also capable of operating missiles and helicopters. This was the first class to be built based on this concept.

== Design ==
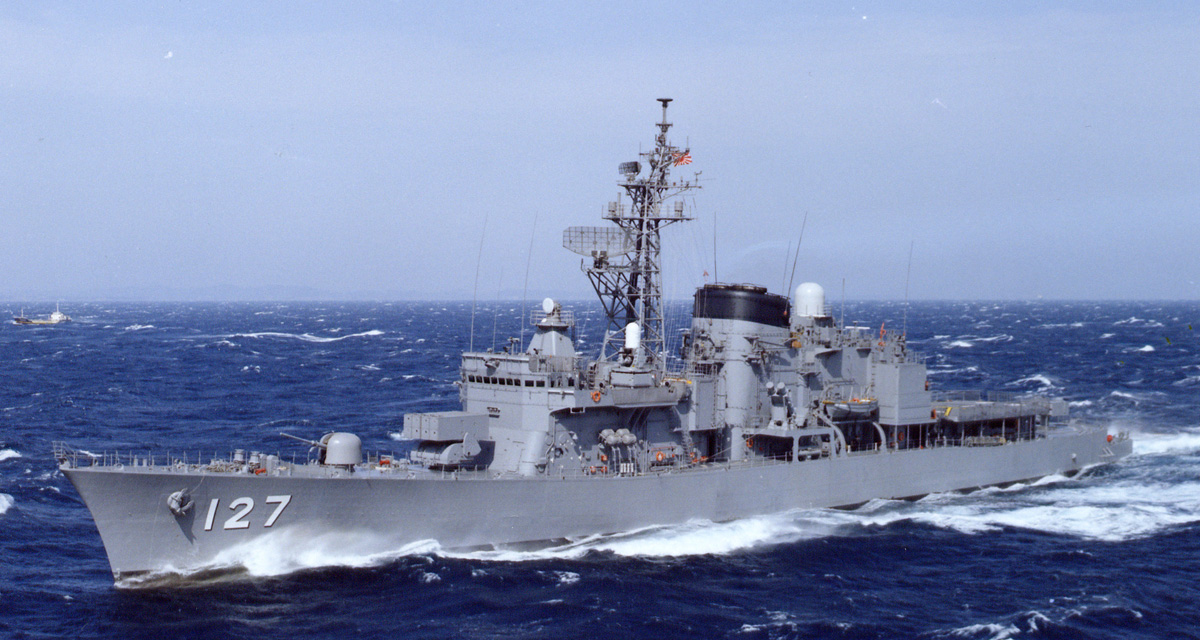
JS Isoyuki (DD-127)

The hull structure was based on the shelter deck style adopted in the Isuzu class, and a long forecastle style was adopted which truncated the rear end. The shape under the water line resembles JDS Amatsukaze. In order to reduce noise, Prairie-Masker was installed after the 3rd ship and was retrofitted to the 1st and 2nd ships at a later date.

From DD-129 onward, steel replaced aluminium for key elements of the superstructure including the bridge to improve resistance and durability. However, due to this design change, ballast had to be installed, the classes displacement increased and the maneuvering performance deteriorated.

It was the first class to use combined gas or gas (COGOG) propulsion system in the JMSDF. The all-gas-turbine propulsion system is composed of two Kawasaki-Rolls-Royce Tyne RM1C gas turbines for cruising and two Kawasaki-Rolls-Royce Olympus TM3B gas turbines for high-speed operation.

This combination and mounting method of these engines are similar to the Type 21 frigates of the British Royal Navy, so it was not possible to adopt an alternating engine room arrangement like a conventional JMSDF destroyer, the lack of redundancy was pointed out.

== Equipment ==
The core of the combat system is the OYQ-5 Tactical Data Processing System (TDPS), composed of one AN/UYK-20 computer and five OJ-194B workstations and capable of receiving data automatically from other ships via Link-14 (STANAG 5514).

This is the first destroyer class in the JMSDF equipped with the Sea Sparrow Improved basic point defense missile system. The IBPDMS of this class uses FCS-2 fire-control systems of Japanese make and one octuple launcher at the afterdeck. And in the JMSDF, OTO Melara 76 mm compact gun and Boeing Harpoon surface-to-surface missile are adopted from the ship of FY1977 including this class. Also, ships built in FY1979 and beyond carried Phalanx CIWS and were retrofitted to previous ships.

This class introduced the capability of shipboard helicopter operations. While the JMSDF already had the Haruna-class "helicopter destroyer", the Hatsuyuki class were the first air-capable general purpose destroyer class. Although it has a small aviation deck, through a beartrap system, the class can operate the Mitsubishi HSS-2B anti-submarine helicopter safely in a wider range of weather conditions. Later, HSS-2B was replaced by Mitsubishi SH-60J, but there was no room to install a large data link device for SH-60J, so a simplified type was installed.

They were initially planned to carry out passive operation with sonobuoys laid by helicopters and towed array sonar (TASS) as sensors, but because the development of TASS was delayed, they was retrofitted later on only four ships. OQS-4 hull sonar was the Japanese equivalent of American AN/SQS-56, and OQR-1 TASS was of AN/SQR-19.

=== Sub-class ===
Four ships of this class have been re-purposed as training vessels: JS Shimayuki (1999), JS Shirayuki (2011), JS Setoyuki (2012) and JS Yamayuki (2016). These ships have been converted for training, yet they still have their weapons systems intact. They are referenced after the lead ship as the: Shimayuki-class.

== Ships in the class ==
Pennant no.	Name	Laid down	Launched	Commissioned	Decommissioned	Shipyard	Home port	Note
DD-122	Hatsuyuki	14 March 1979	7 November 1980	23 March 1982	25 June 2010	Sumitomo Heavy Industries, Uraga	Yokosuka	
DD-123; TV-3517	Shirayuki	3 December 1979	4 August 1981	8 February 1982	27 April 2016	Hitachi, Mauzuru	Yokosuka	Converted to training vessel (TV-3517) on 16 March 2011.
DD-124	Mineyuki	7 May 1981	19 October 1982	26 January 1984	7 March 2013	Mitsubishi Heavy Industries	Maizuru	
DD-125	Sawayuki	22 April 1981	21 June 1982	15 February 1984	1 April 2013	IHI Corporation	Yokosuka	
DD-126	Hamayuki	4 February 1981	27 May 1982	18 November 1983	14 March 2012	Mitsui Engineering & Shipbuilding, Tamano	Maizuru	
DD-127	Isoyuki	20 April 1982	19 September 1983	23 January 1985	13 March 2014	IHI Corporation	Sasebo	
DD-128	Haruyuki	11 March 1982	6 September 1983	14 March 1985	13 March 2014	Sumitomo Heavy Industries, Uraga	Sasebo	
DD-129; TV-3519	Yamayuki	25 February 1983	10 July 1984	3 December 1985	19 March 2020	Hitachi, Mauzuru	Kure	Converted to training vessel (TV-3519) on 27 April 2016.
DD-130	Matsuyuki	7 April 1983	25 October 1984	19 March 1986	7 April 2021	IHI Corporation	Kure	
DD-131; TV-3518	Setoyuki	26 January 1984	3 July 1985	11 December 1986	23 December 2021	Mitsui Engineering & Shipbuilding, Tamano	Kure	Converted to training vessel (TV-3518) on 14 March 2012.
DD-132	Asayuki	22 December 1983	16 October 1985	20 February 1987	16 November 2020	Sumitomo Heavy Industries, Uraga	Sasebo	
DD-133; TV-3513	Shimayuki	8 May 1984	29 January 1986	17 February 1987	19 March 2021	Mitsubishi Heavy Industries	Kure	Converted to training vessel (TV-3513) on 18 March 1999.

== See also ==
- List of destroyer classes

Equivalent destroyers of the same era

- Almirante Brown class
- Kidd class
- Udaloy class
- Rajput class
- Type 051D
