= JS Sawayuki =

Destroyer of the Japan Maritime Self-Defense Force

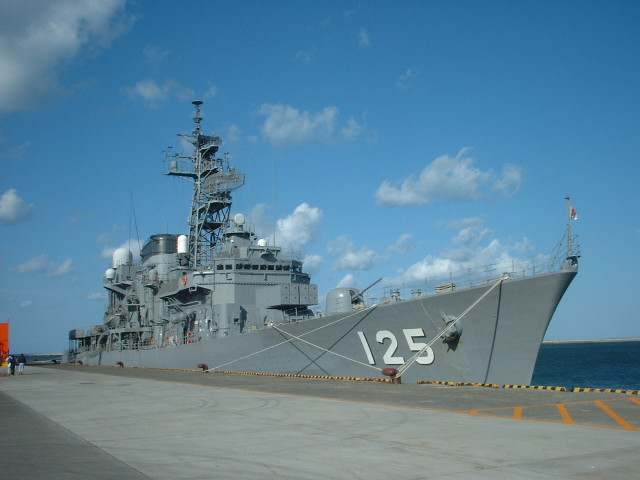

History

Japan
- Name: Sawayuki; (さわゆき)
- Builder: IHI Maritime
- Laid down: 22 Apr 1981
- Launched: 21 Jun 1982
- Commissioned: 15 Feb 1984
- Decommissioned: 1 April 2013
- Home port: Yokosuka
- Status: Retired

General characteristics
- Class & type: Hatsuyuki-class destroyer
- Displacement: 2,950 long tons (3,000 t)
- Length: 130 m (430 ft)
- Beam: 13.6 m (45 ft)
- Draft: 4.2 m (14 ft)

JS Sawayuki (DD-125) is a Hatsuyuki-class destroyer of the Japan Maritime Self-Defense Force (JMSDF).

The ship was built by IHI Maritime in Tokyo and commissioned into service on 15 Feb 1984.

== Service ==
This ship was one of several in the JMSDF fleet participating in disaster relief after the 2011 Tōhoku earthquake and tsunami.
