= JS Hamayuki =

Hatsuyuki-class destroyer

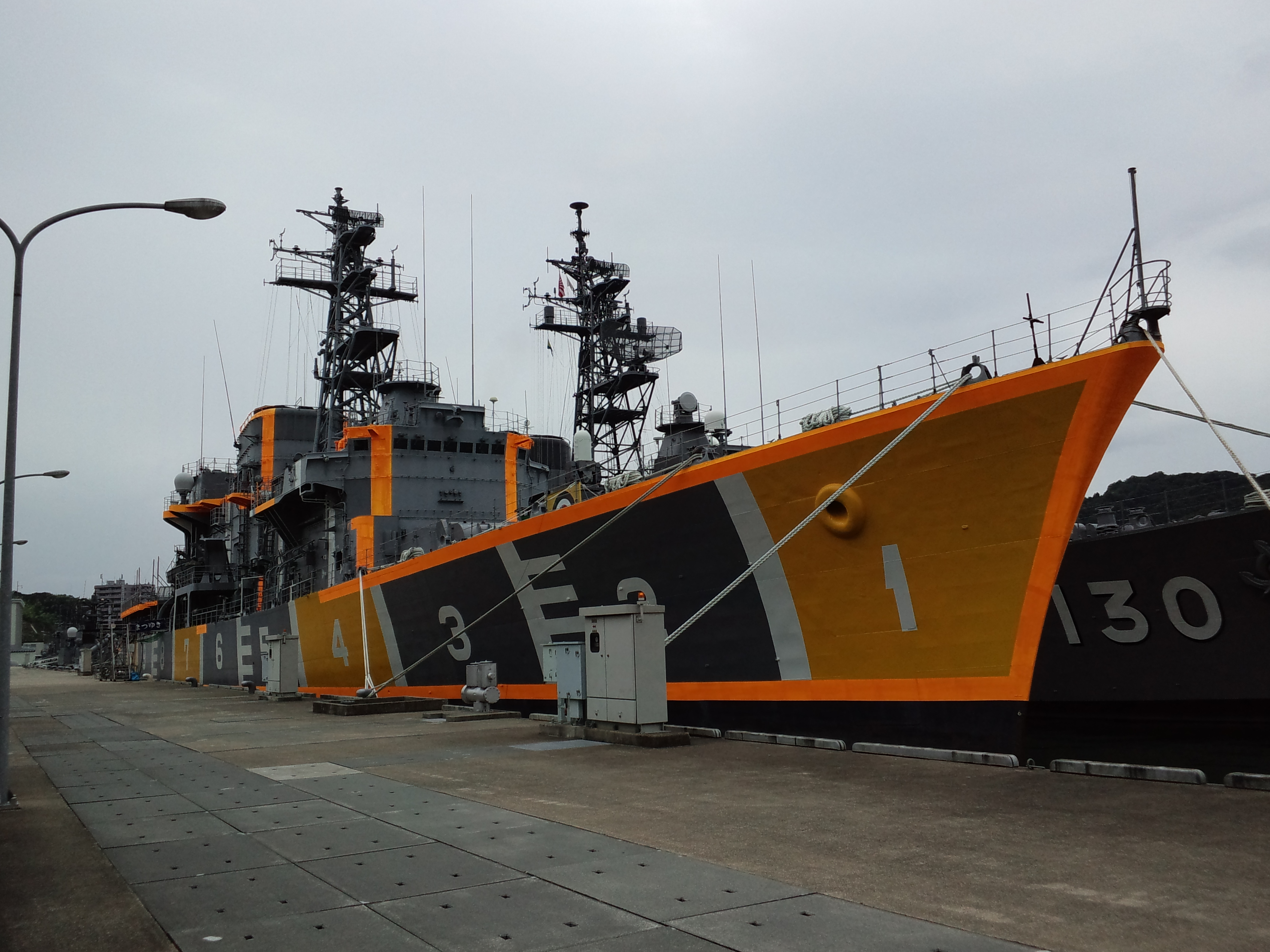
- JS Hamayuki on 7 July 2013

History

Japan
- Name: Hamayuki; (はまゆき)
- Ordered: 1979
- Builder: Mitsui, Tamano
- Laid down: 4 February 1981
- Launched: 27 May 1982
- Commissioned: 18 November 1983
- Decommissioned: 14 March 2012
- Stricken: October 2013
- Home port: Maizuru
- Identification: Pennant number: DD-126
- Fate: Sunk as target, 2013

General characteristics
- Class & type: Hatsuyuki-class destroyer
- Displacement: 2,950 tons standard, 4,000 tons hull load
- Length: 130 m (430 ft)
- Beam: 13.6 m (44 ft 7 in)
- Draft: 4.2 m (13 ft 9 in); 4.4 m (14 ft 5 in) (DD 129 to DD 132)
- Propulsion: 2 × KHI-RR TM3B gas turbines, 45,000 shp (34 MW); 2 × KHI-RR RM1C gas turbines, 9,900 shp (7.4 MW); 2 shafts, cp props
- Speed: 30 knots (35 mph; 56 km/h)
- Complement: 200
- Sensors & processing systems: OYQ-5 tactical data system; FCS-2 fire-control system; OPS-14 air search radar; OPS-18 surface search radar; OQS-4 hull sonar; OQR-1 TASS (in some ships)
- Electronic warfare & decoys: NOLR-6C intercept; OLT-3 jammer; Mark 36 SRBOC; Towed torpedo decoys
- Armament: 1 × OTO Melara 76 mm gun; 2 × 20 mm Phalanx CIWS; 2 × Harpoon SSM quad canisters; 1 × Sea Sparrow SAM octuple launcher; 1 × ASROC octuple launcher; 2 × triple 324 mm torpedo tubes
- Aircraft carried: 1 × HSS-2B or SH-60J helicopter
- Aviation facilities: Hangar and helipad

JS Hamayuki (DD-126) was a Hatsuyuki-class destroyer of the Japanese Maritime Self-Defense Force.

== Development and design ==
Adopting Japan's first all-gas turbine engine (COGOG), equipped with well-balanced weapons such as helicopters, C4I systems, and various missiles, it is inferior to Western frigate at that time. It has been evaluated as a non-escort ship. Twelve ships were built as first-generation general-purpose escort vessels in the era of eight ships and eight aircraft, they supported the escort fleet for a long time, but now they are gradually retiring due to aging.

In addition, there are many changes to training ships, and up to three ships have been operated in the training fleet as Shimayuki-class training ships, but the decline has begun with the conversion of Hatakaze-class destroyers to training ships.

The core of the combat system is the OYQ-5 Tactical Data Processing System (TDPS), composed of one AN/UYK-20 computer and five OJ-194B workstations and capable of receiving data automatically from other ships via Link-14 (STANAG 5514).

This is the first destroyer class in the JMSDF equipped with the Sea Sparrow Improved basic point defense missile system. The IBPDMS of this class uses FCS-2 fire-control systems of Japanese make and one octuple launcher at the afterdeck. And in the JMSDF, OTO Melara 76 mm compact gun and Boeing Harpoon surface-to-surface missile are adopted from the ship of FY1977 including this class. Also, ships built in FY1979 and beyond carried Phalanx CIWS and were retrofitted to previous ships.

== Construction and career ==
She was laid down on 4 February 1981 and launched on 27 May 1982 at Mitsui Engineering & Shipbuilding Shipyard in Tamano. She commissioned on 18 November 1983.

In 1986, she participated in Exercise RIMPAC 1986.

On March 6, 1990, the 42nd Escort Corps was reorganized under the 3rd Escort Corps group, and the homeport was transferred to Maizuru. In the same year, she participated in Exercise RIMPAC 1990.

In March 2013, she underwent ship remodeling by Japan Marine United Maizuru. From the bow side to the stern, numbers 1 to 13 divided every 10 m and white and orange paint were applied, and drums for targets and heat sources were installed on the ship. On October 5, 2013, she left the Kitasui quay for shooting disposition by live-fire training. The training was held in the waters north of Wakasa Bay from the 6th to the 11th, and was the target of shooting by five escort vessels and two patrol aircraft which dropped bombs on her.

== Gallery ==
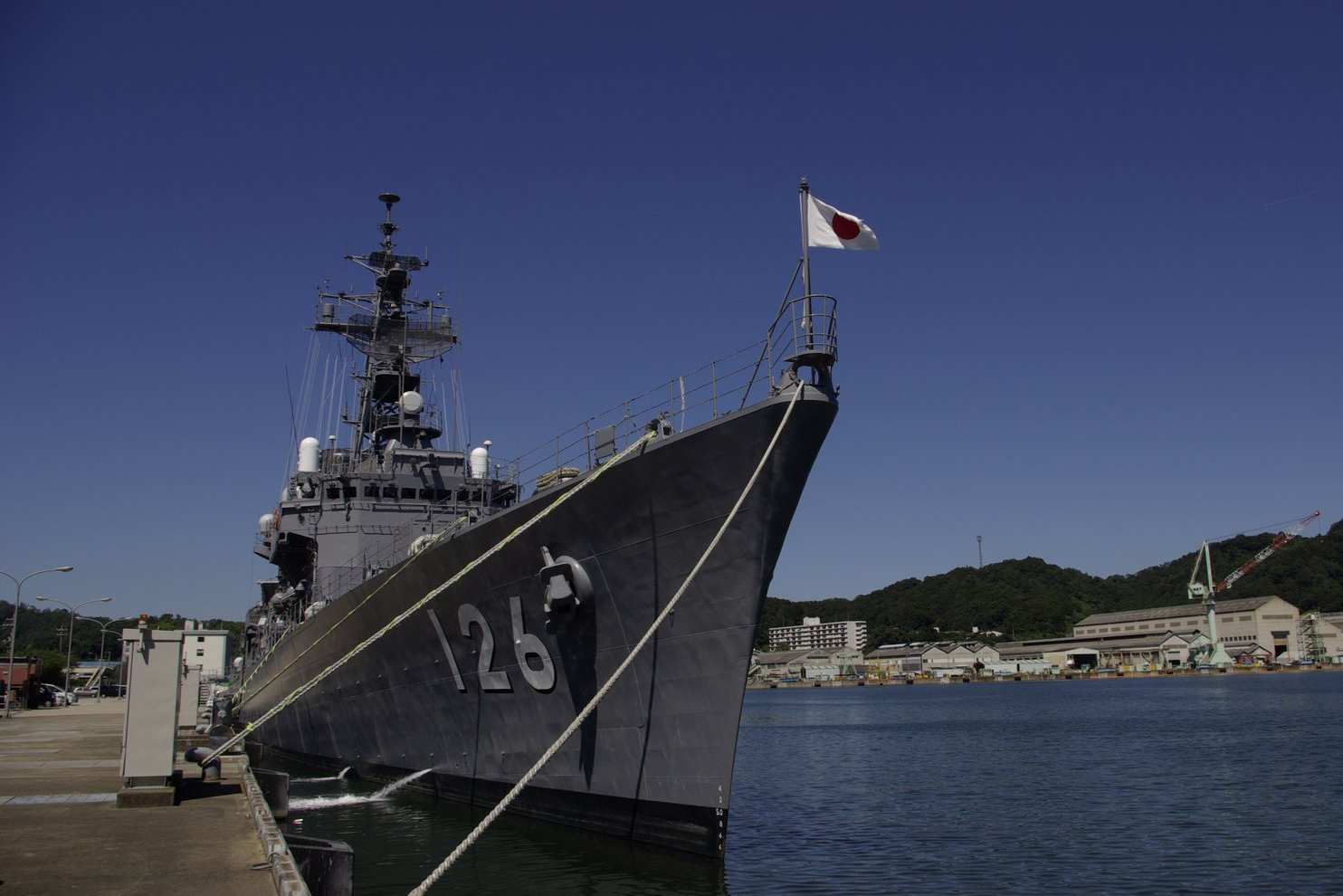
JS Hamayuki at Maizuru on 13 August 2007.

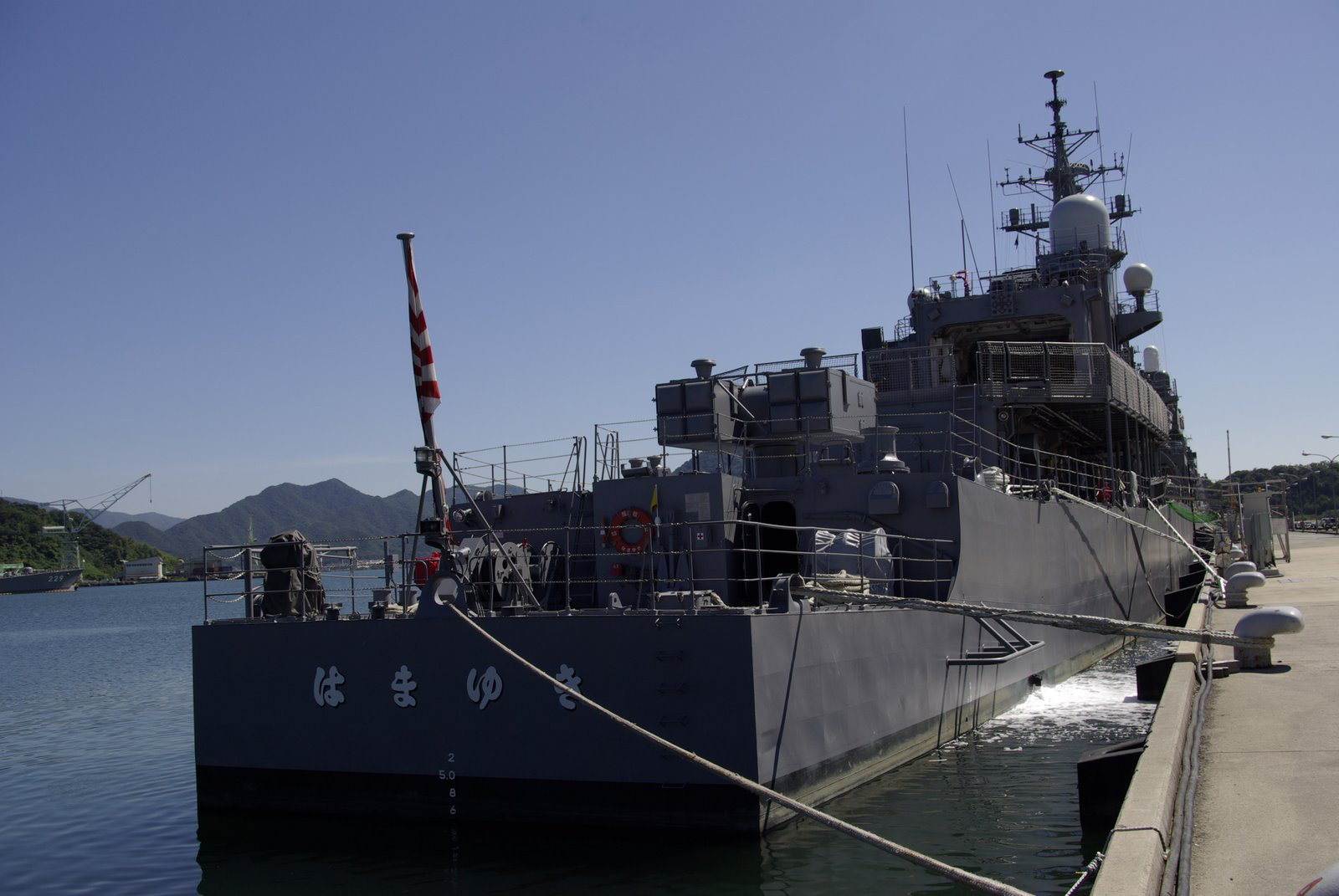
JS Hamayuki at Maizuru on 13 August 2007.

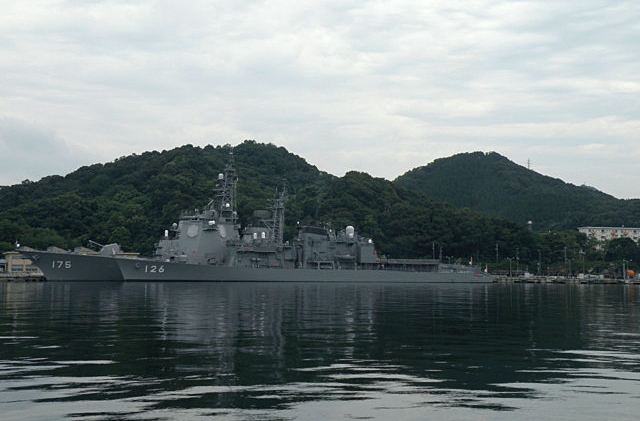
JS Hamayuki alongside JS Myōkō on 18 July 2009.

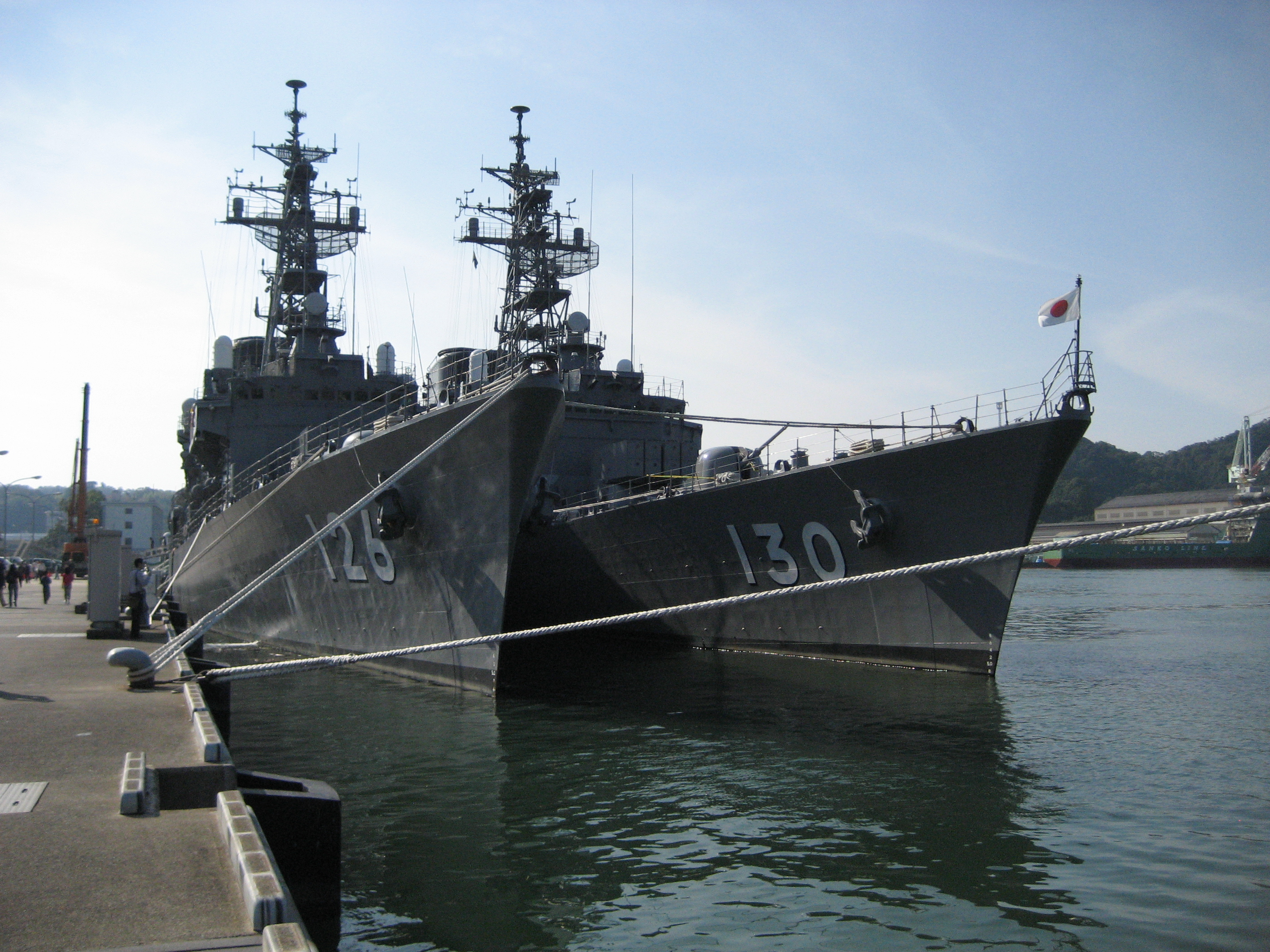
JS Hamayuki alongside JS Matsuyuki at Maizuru on 9 October 2011.

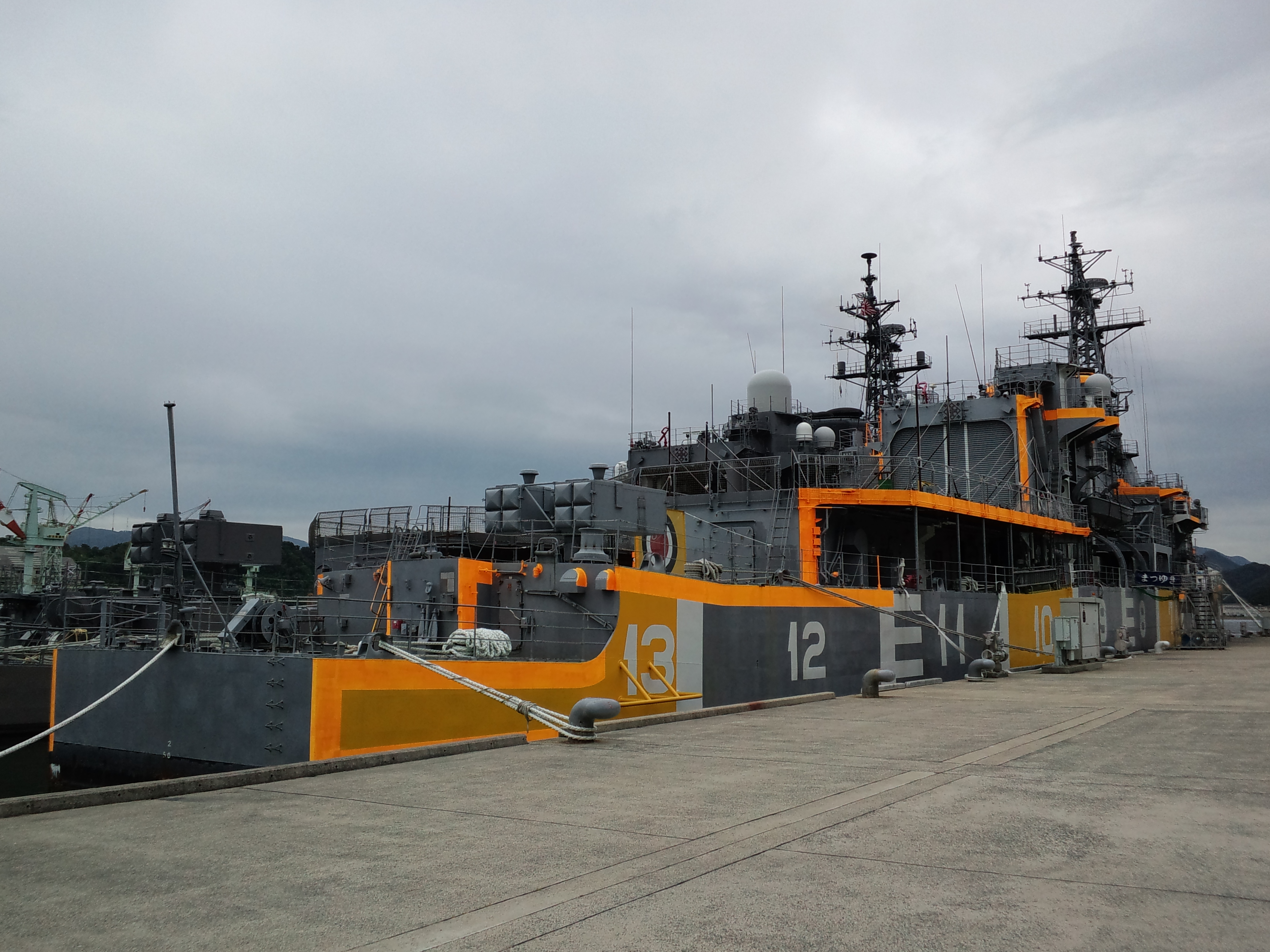
JS Hamayuki painted as a target ship on 7 July 2013.
