= JS Yamayuki =

Destroyer of the Japan Maritime Self-Defense Force

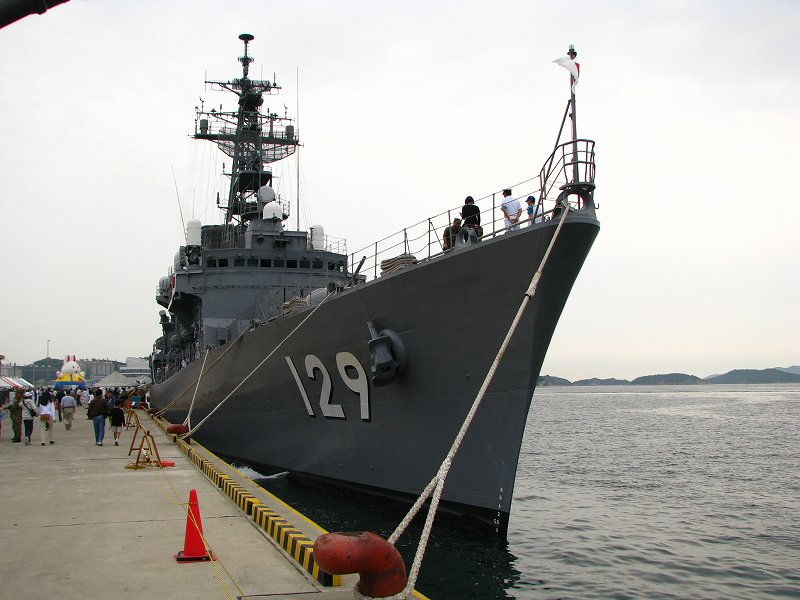
- JS Yamayuki (DD-129) moored in Tamano, May 2008

History

Japan
- Name: Yamayuki; (やまゆき)
- Builder: Hitachi Maizuru shipyard, Maizuru
- Laid down: 25 February 1983
- Launched: 10 July 1984
- Commissioned: 3 December 1985
- Decommissioned: 19 March 2020
- Home port: Kure
- Identification: MMSI number: 431999519; Hull number: DD-129
- Reclassified: TV-3519
- Status: Retired

General characteristics
- Class & type: Hatsuyuki-class destroyer
- Displacement: 2,950 long tons (3,000 t)
- Length: 130 m (430 ft)
- Beam: 13.6 m (45 ft)
- Draft: 4.2 m (14 ft)
- Propulsion: 2 x Kawasaki/Rolls-Royce Olympus TM-3B gas turbines (45000 shp); 2 x Kawasaki/Rolls-Royce Tyne RM-1C gas turbines (9900 shp); 2 shafts, 2 controllable pitch propellers
- Speed: 30 knts
- Complement: 200
- Armament: 1 x Oto-Melara 76mm/62-caliber gun (3-inches); 2 x Mk-141 missile launcher for 8 RGM-84 Harpoon SSM; 1 x Mk-29 launcher for 8 RIM-7 Sea Sparrow SAM; 2 x Mk-15 Phalanx Close-In-Weapon-System (CIWS); 1 x Mk-16 launcher for 8 RUR-5 ASROC anti-submarine rockets; 2 x HOS-301 (Mk-32) 12,75-inch (324mm) triple torpedo tubes
- Aircraft carried: 1 S-61 Sea King or SH-60J Seahawk
- Aviation facilities: flight deck and hangar for 1 helicopter

JS Yamayuki (DD-129/TV-3519) was a Hatsuyuki-class destroyer of the Japan Maritime Self-Defense Force (JMSDF).

== Construction and career ==
The ship was built by Hitachi Zosen at their Maizuru shipyard, laid down on 25 February 1983 and launched on 10 July 1984. Yamayuki was commissioned into service on 3 December 1985.

This ship was one of several in the JMSDF fleet participating in disaster relief after the 2011 Tōhoku earthquake and tsunami.

She was converted to a training vessel and redesignated as TV-3519 on 27 April 2016. She was retired on 19 March 2020.
