= AN/UYK-20 =

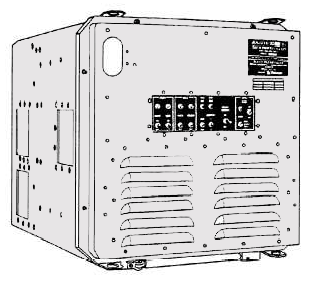
AN/UYK-20

The AN/UYK-20 Data Processing Set was a ruggedized small computer manufactured by Univac and used by the United States Navy for small and medium-sized shipboard and shore systems built in the 1970s. It featured non-volatile magnetic core memory and was housed in a heavy-duty metal cube-shaped box which was designed to fit through a 25-inch circular hatch.

In 1972, in response to the proliferation of small computer types in the Navy's inventory, the Chief of Naval Material mandated the use of the AN/UYK-20(V) in systems requiring a small digital processor. In March 1974 the AN/UYK-20 received service approval and by late 1974 they were in use in the development of tactical systems.

Programmers and operators colloquially referred to this computer as the "Yuck Twenty", according to those who worked with it at Sperry-Univac's Technical Services Division in 1976. It was to be the control system for a Marine Air Traffic and Landing System (MATCALS) contracted to Sperry-Univac by the Navy at Mare Island, CA.

In accordance with the Joint Electronics Type Designation System (JETDS), the "AN/UYK-20" designation represents the 20th design of an Army-Navy electronic device for general utility data processing computing equipment. The JETDS system also now is used to name all Department of Defense electronic systems.

== Technical ==
In addition to various uses throughout the fleet, the system was used to train the U.S. Navy's Data Systems Technicians (DS) on digital computer theory and application. The 9-month course had 4 phases and phase 3 was UYK-20. Phase 3 was broken into the following sections:

- Microinstructions
- Macroinstructions
- Processor/Emulator
- Memory
- Input/Output
- Graded Troubleshooting (Mids)- MIDS was the last week of Phase 3 where the class started at 2300 hours and finished at 0630. Each night a series of faults was inserted into the UYK-20 for troubleshooting purposes. The student had to use diagnostic routines, troubleshooting techniques, and skill to find and fix the faults. The student had to pass with a majority of faults identified and fixed to move on to phase 4. Phase 3 for some was the toughest part of Data Systems A School at Mare Island, CA. Phase 2 used the training computer called the COMTRAN 10 aka "Comtrash 10".
- In order to resolve faults, the front panel was used to see the address where the program halted. The programmer then referred to a listing of the program in memory and used the displayed address (in octal) to locate the instruction in the listing. Once a solution was determined and written at the end of the listing, that instruction was replaced with a jump to an empty area of memory, where the fix was then implemented, and at the end of that series of assembly instructions, a jump back to the offending location was inserted. All this was entered into the front panel's address display, in octal, so the programmer became very adept at both reading and entering octal via the lighted switches very quickly.

After the dissolution of the Navy's DS rate, the primary maintenance responsibility was moved to the Electronic Technicians (ET), as the UYK-20 was already being used in several of their systems primarily the NAVMACS system.

== See also ==
- AN/AYK-14
- AN/UYK-44
- CMS-2 programming language
- List of military electronics of the United States
