= JS Chikuma =

Abukuma-class destroyer escort

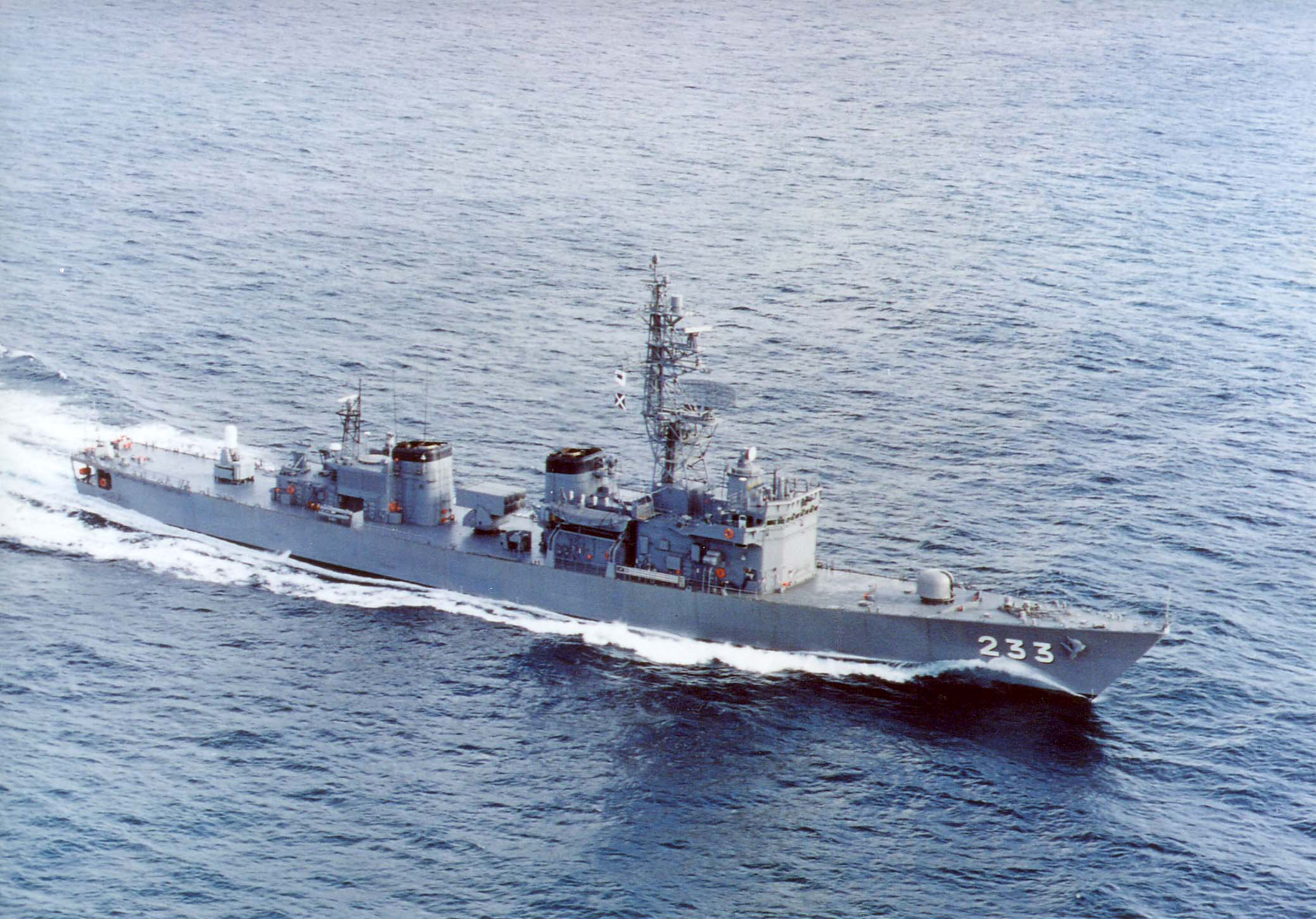
- JS Chikuma

History

Japan
- Name: Chikuma; (ちくま)
- Namesake: Chikuma (1938)
- Ordered: 1989
- Builder: Hitachi, Osaka
- Laid down: 14 February 1991
- Launched: 25 January 1992
- Commissioned: 24 February 1993
- Home port: Ominato
- Identification: MMSI number: 431999575; Pennant number: DE-233
- Status: Active

General characteristics
- Class & type: Abukuma-class destroyer escort
- Displacement: 2,000 tons standard; 2,550 tons full load
- Length: 357 ft (109 m)
- Beam: 44 ft (13 m)
- Draft: 12 ft (3.7 m)
- Propulsion: CODOG, two shafts; 2 × Kawasaki-RR SM1A gas turbines26,650 hp (19,870 kW); 2 × Mitsubishi S12U MTK diesels 6,000 hp (4,500 kW)
- Speed: 27 knots (50 km/h)
- Complement: 120
- Sensors & processing systems: FCS-2
- Armament: 8 × Harpoon missiles; ASROC octuple launcher; 1 × Otobreda 76 mm gun; 1 × Phalanx 20 mm CIWS; 2 × HOS-301 triple 324 mm (12.8 in) torpedo tubes

JS Chikuma (DE-233) is the fifth ship of the Abukuma-class destroyer escorts. She was commissioned on 24 February 1993.

== Construction and career ==
Chikuma was laid down at Hitachi Zosen Corporation Osaka Shipyard on 14 February 1991 and launched on 25 January 1992. She was commissioned on 24 February 1993 and deployed to Maizuru.

The Australian Navy destroyer HMAS Perth and the frigate HMAS Canberra, which docked at Maizuru from October 29 to November 3, 1993, hosted the escort ship JS Abukuma.

On June 13, 2000, she was transferred to the 25th Escort Corps of the Ominato District Force in place of the training ship JS Akigumo, and her homeport was transferred from Maizuru to Mutsu.

From May 11 to May 15, 2012, she and the French Navy information gathering ship Dupuy de Lôme participated in exercises at Hakodate Port.

At around 15:40 on November 22, 2018, she was firing her high-performance Phalanx CIWS cannon on the deck about 130 km off Kumejima, Okinawa Prefecture, heavy seas caused the misfire of 21 rounds. The still live ammunition was dropped into the sea, and there were no injuries.

== Gallery ==
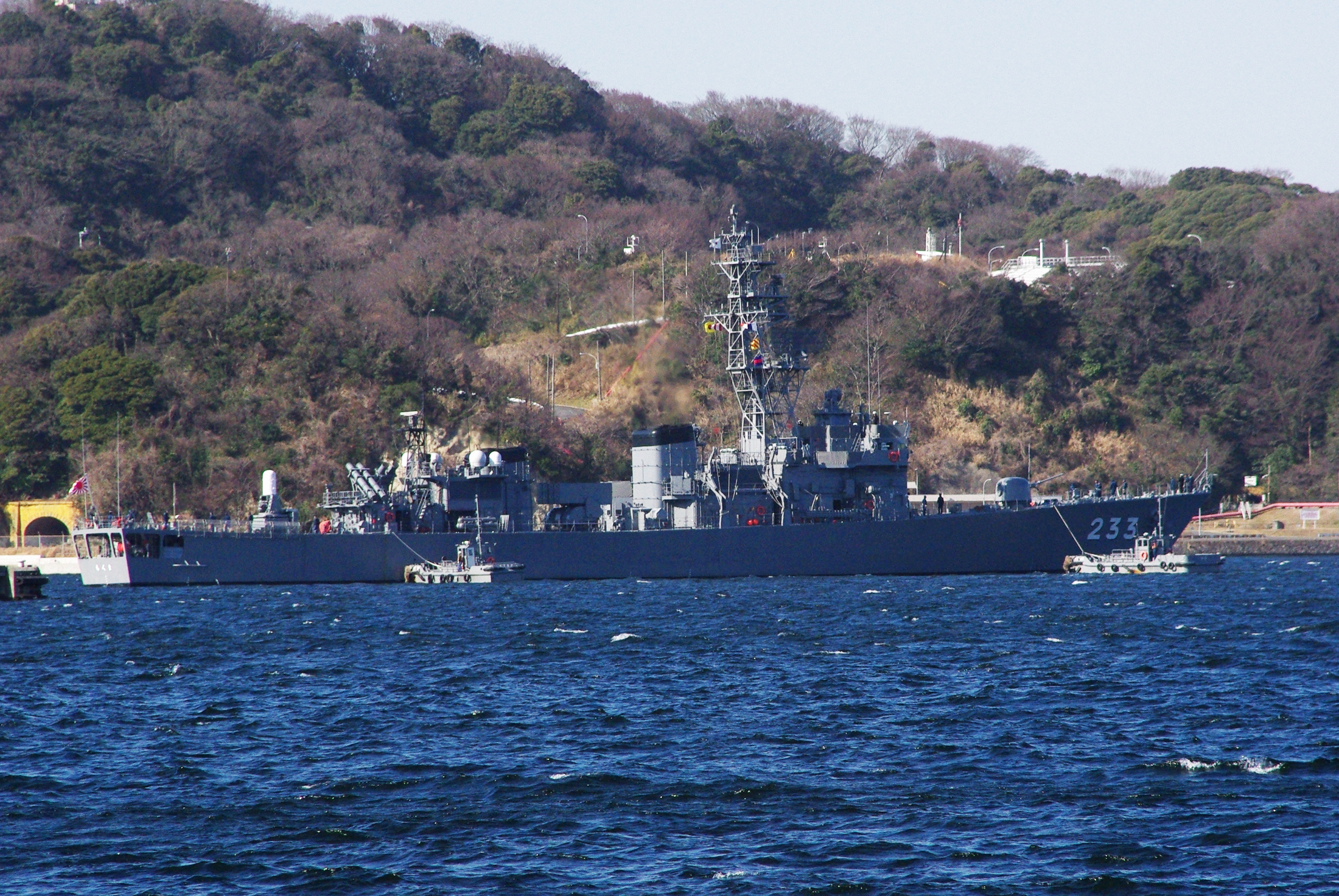
JS Chikuma at Yokosuka on 8 February 2009.

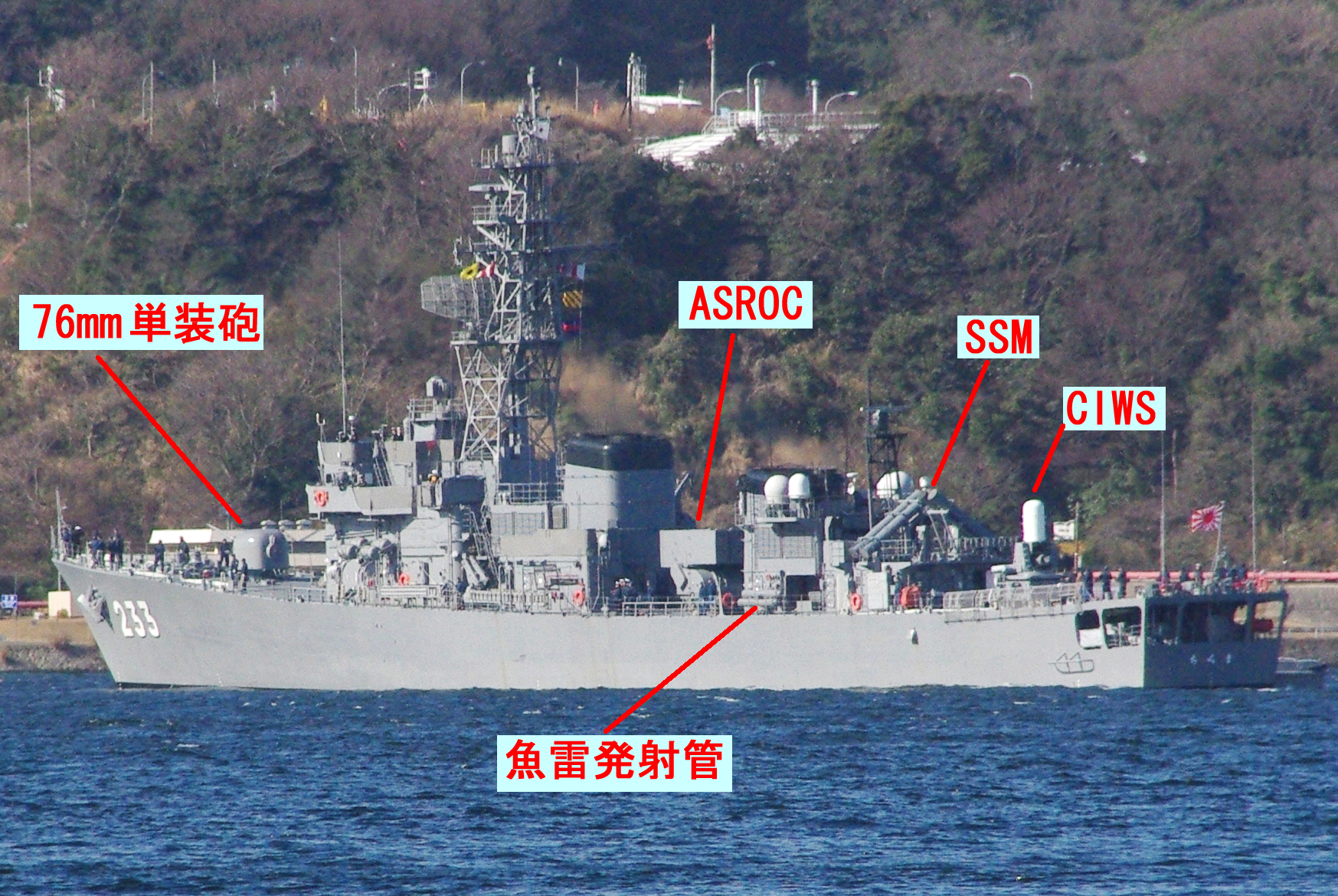
JS Chikuma at Yokosuka on 8 February 2009.

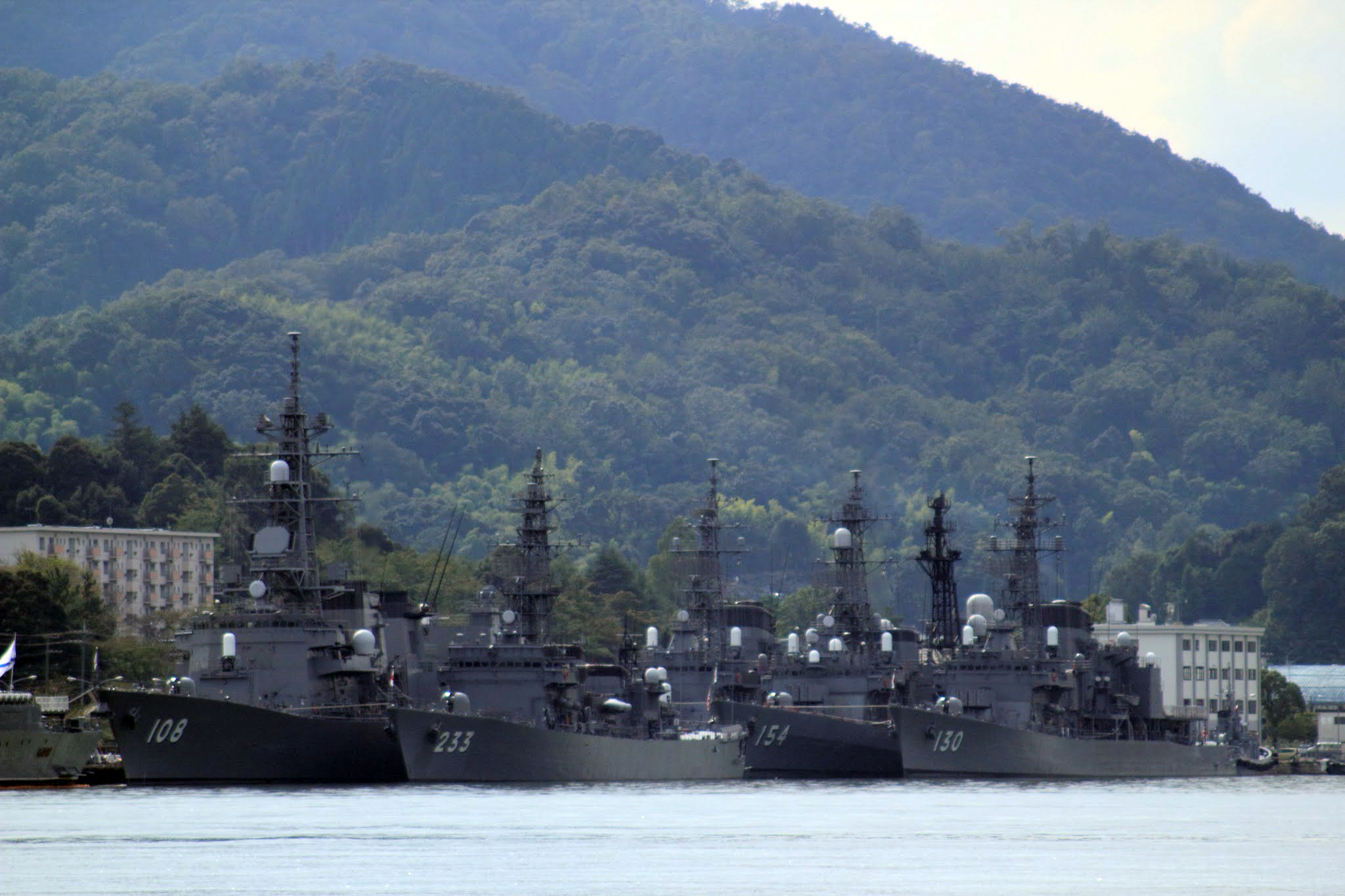
JS Akebono, JS Chikuma, JS Amagiri and JS Matsuyuki at Maizuru on 25 September 2011.

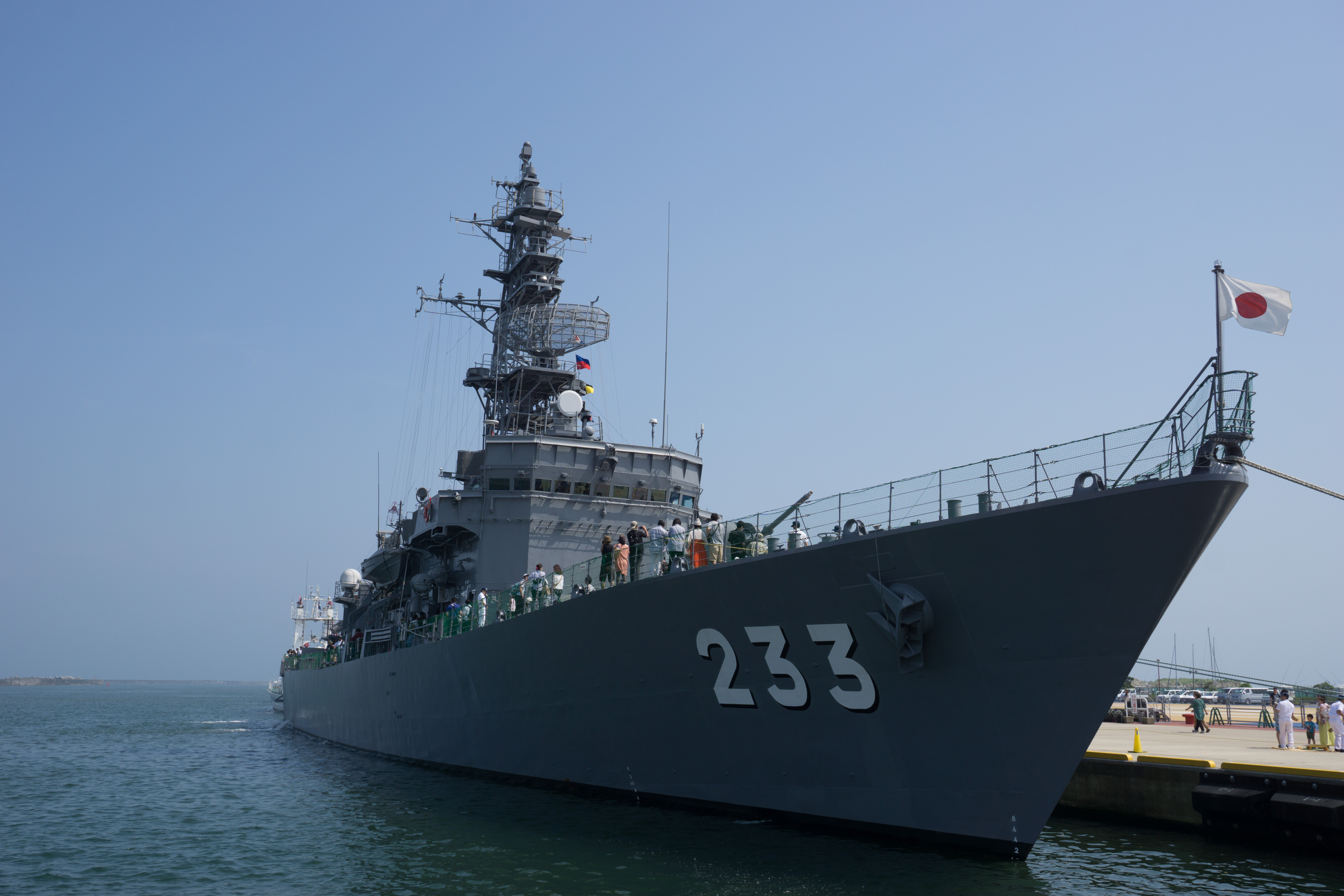
JS Chikuma at Ōarai on 12 July 2015.

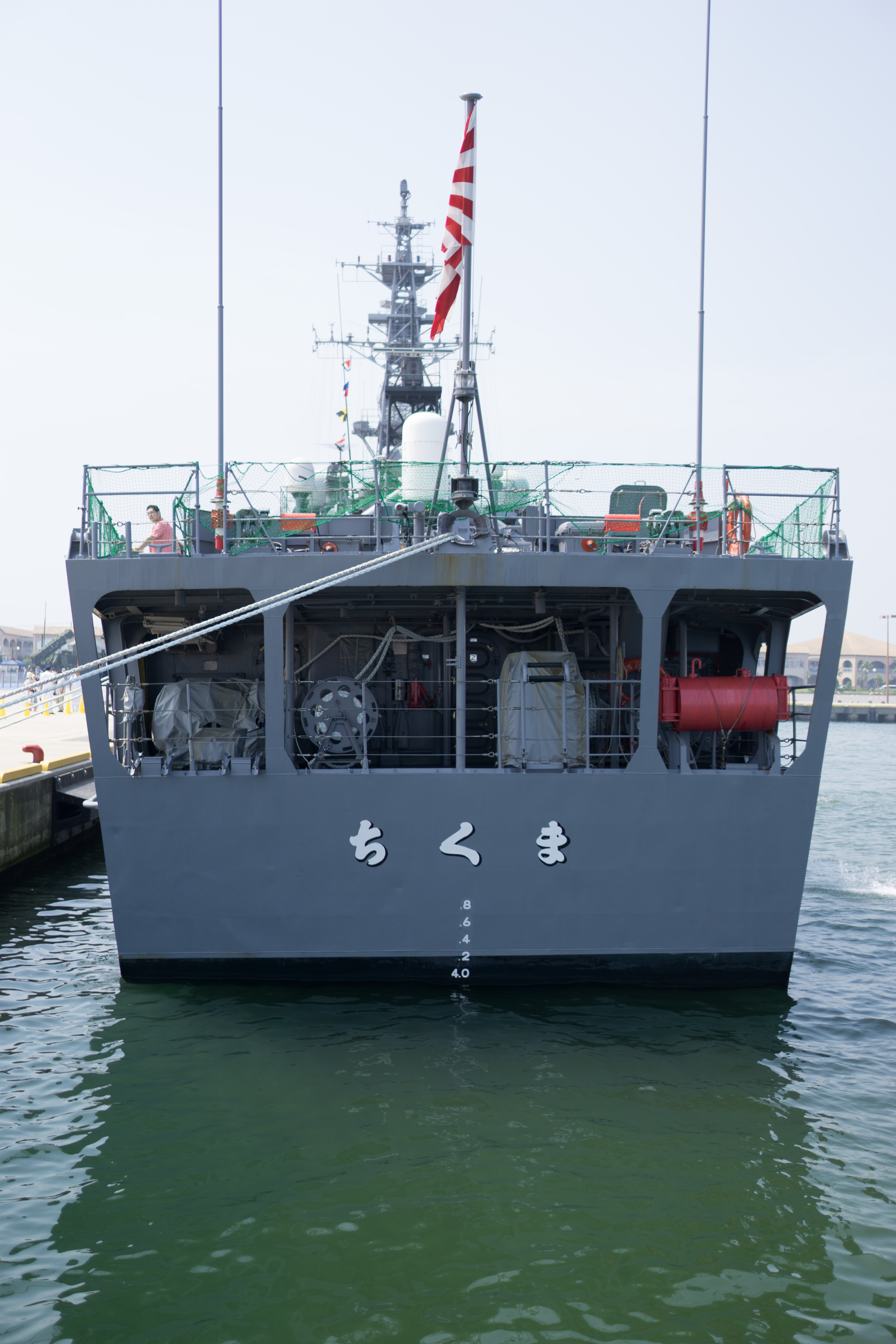
JS Chikuma at Ōarai on 12 July 2015.

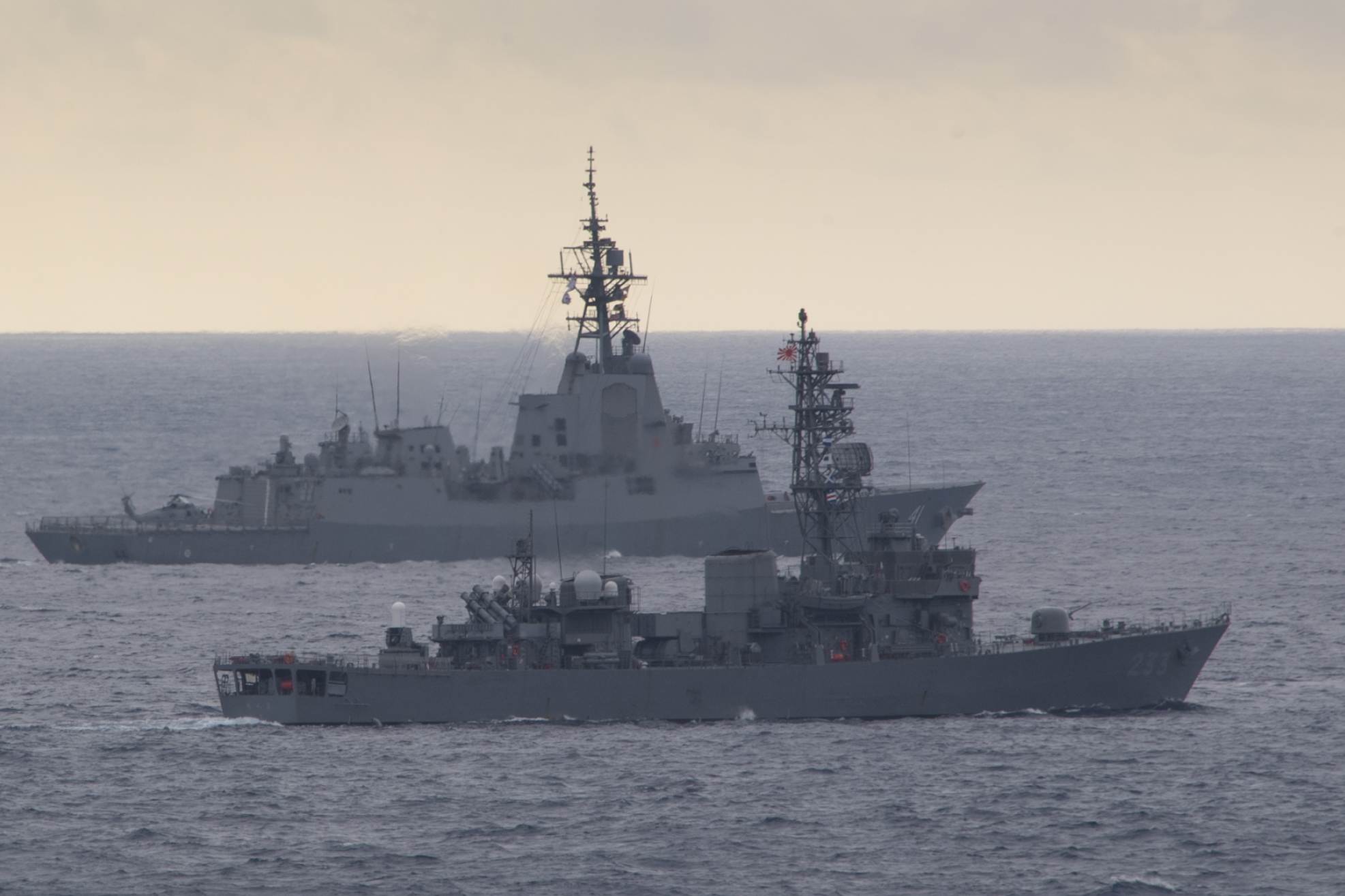
JS Chikuma and HMAS Brisbane sail in formation on 10 November 2023.
