= Hokkai Maru =

Hokkai Maru may refer to:

- Japanese stores ship Hokkai Maru (1934), Japanese World War II-era stores ship
- Japanese transport ship Hokkai Maru, Japanese World War II-era transport ship
- Japanese tugboat Hokkai Maru, Japanese World War II-era rescue tug
- Japanese transport ship Hayataka Maru (1923) (ex-Hokkai Maru No. 2), Japanese World War II-era transport ship
- Japanese transport Suzuya Maru (1922) (ex-Hokkai Maru No. 1), Japanese World War II-era transport ship
