= Japanese destroyer Namikaze =

Destroyer of the Imperial Japanese Navy

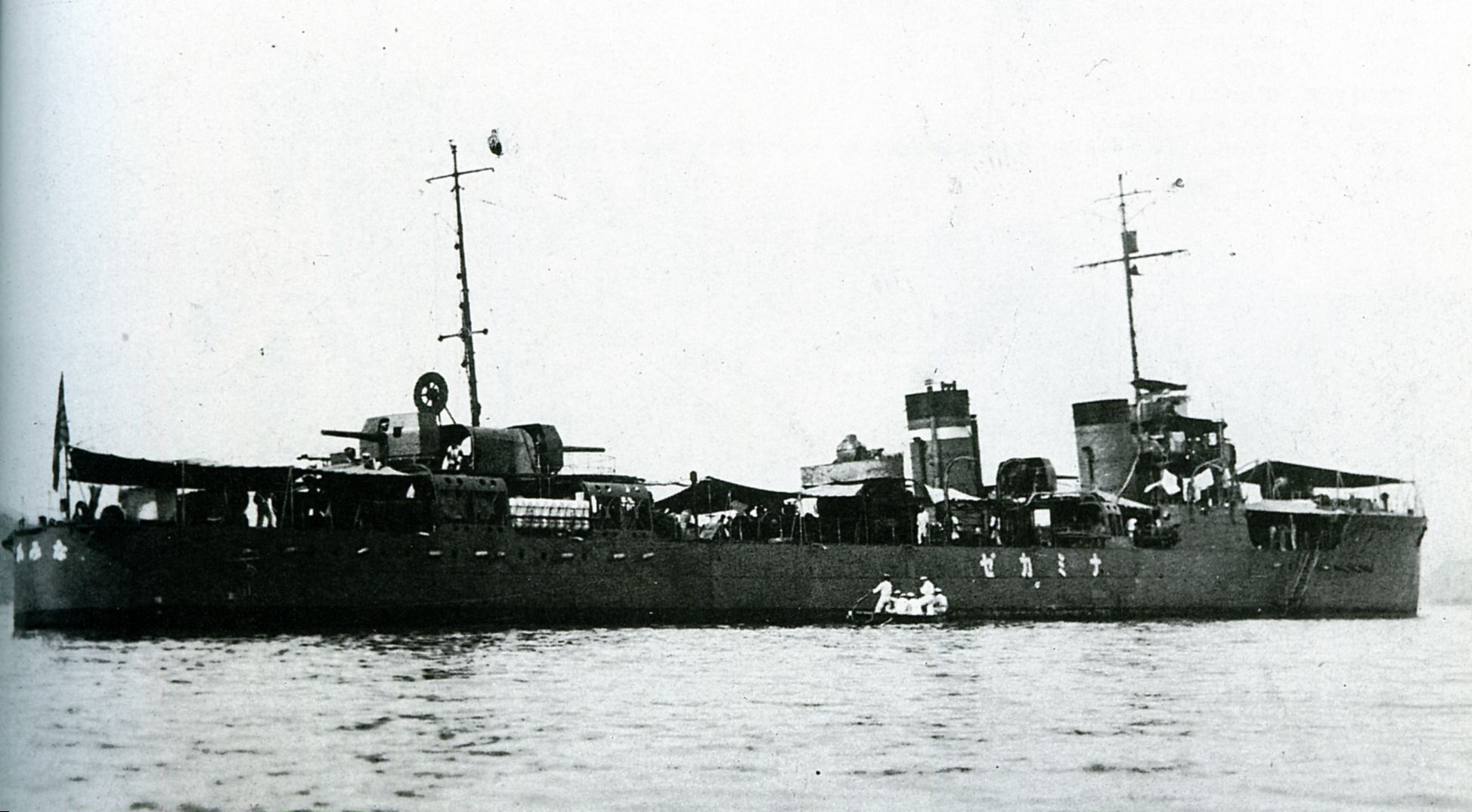
- Namikaze in 1925

History

Empire of Japan
- Name: Namikaze
- Ordered: 1918 fiscal year
- Builder: Maizuru Naval Arsenal
- Laid down: 7 November 1921
- Launched: 24 June 1922
- Commissioned: 11 November 1922
- Decommissioned: Converted to kaiten carrier 1 February 1945
- Stricken: 5 October 1945
- Fate: Prize of war to ROC Navy

Republic of China
- Name: ROCS Shen Yang
- Acquired: 3 October 1947
- Fate: Scrapped, 1960

General characteristics
- Class & type: improved Minekaze-class destroyer
- Displacement: 1,215 long tons (1,234 t) normal, 1,650 long tons (1,680 t) full load
- Length: 97.5 m (320 ft) pp, 102.6 m (337 ft) overall
- Beam: 8.9 m (29 ft)
- Draught: 2.9 m (9.5 ft)
- Propulsion: 2-shaft Mitsubishi-Parsons geared turbines, 4 boilers 38,500 ihp (28,700 kW)
- Speed: 39 knots (72 km/h)
- Range: 3,600 nautical miles (6,700 km) at 14 knots (26 km/h)
- Complement: 148
- Armament: 4 × Type 3 120 mm 45 caliber naval gun; 6 × 21 in (533 mm) torpedo tubes (plus 2 reloads); 2 × 7.7 mm machine guns; 20 Type 1 naval mines

Service record
- Operations: Second Sino-Japanese War; Pacific War

Namikaze (波風, Wave Wind) was the second ship of the Nokaze subclass, an improvement to the Minekaze-class first class destroyers built for the Imperial Japanese Navy following World War I. Advanced for their time, these ships served as first-line destroyers through the 1930s, but were considered obsolescent by the start of the Pacific War. Following the war, the ship was transferred to the Republic of China as a prize of war and renamed Shen Yang.

== History ==
Construction of the large-sized Minekaze-class destroyers was authorized as part of the Imperial Japanese Navy's 8-4 Fleet Program from fiscal 1917, with nine vessels, and fiscal 1918 with an additional six vessels. However, the final three vessels in the fiscal year 1918 were built to a different design and have a different enough silhouette that many authors consider them to be a separate class. Namikaze, built at the Maizuru Naval Arsenal, was the second ship of this subclass. The destroyer was laid down on 7 November 1921, launched on 24 June 1922, and commissioned on 11 November 1922.

On completion, Namikaze was teamed with sister ships Nokaze, Numakaze, and flagship Kamikaze at the Yokosuka Naval District to form Destroyer Division 1 (第一駆逐隊). In 1938–1939, the division was assigned to patrols of the northern and central China coastlines in support of Japanese combat operations in the Second Sino-Japanese War

=== World War II history ===
At the time of the attack on Pearl Harbor, Namikaze was based at the Ōminato Guard District in northern Japan, and was assigned to patrols of the Hokkaidō and Chishima Islands coastlines.

During the Battle of Midway in May 1942, Namikaze was assigned to the reserve force for the Aleutian Islands Operation, which did not leave Japanese waters. Afterwards, she returned to patrol and escort duties based out of Ōminato through July 1943, with the ship's patrol area extended to include much of Honshū as far south as Ise Bay. In July, she was assigned temporarily to the IJN 5th Fleet for the mission to evacuate surviving Japanese forces from Kiska, but only performed backup duties. She was slightly damaged in a collision with the coastal patrol vessel Manei Maru No.7 at the entry to Otaru port, Hokkaidō, on 6 November 1943. Namikaze continued to be based at Ōminato for patrol and escort duties in northern waters until December 1943.

In December 1943, Namikaze was reassigned to Moji on 1 December to escort convoys to French Indochina. She returned to Ōminato to resume the Hokkaidō-Chishima patrols from March 1944.

On 21 August 1944, Namikaze was torpedoed by the submarine USS Seal north of Iturup. Her stern severed, she was towed by Kamikaze to Otaru for emergency repairs. She was subsequently sent on to Maizuru Naval Arsenal for rebuilding into a carrier for Kaiten manned torpedoes.

This conversion involved removing three of her four main guns and all of the torpedo launchers. Her first boiler was also removed, reducing her output to 25,000 ihp (19,000 kW) and top speed to 29.5 knots (54.6 km/h). Six Type 96 25 mm AT/AA Guns and eight 13.2 mm (0.52 in) antiaircraft guns were added. The stern was modified with a sloping deck, and two to four Kaiten could be carried.

After completion of the refit on 1 February 1945, Namikaze was assigned to the Combined Fleet, but no record has been found of Namikaze actually launching Kaiten in battle. From 16 June 1945, Namikaze was based at Ube in the Inland Sea, and was used primarily as a minesweeper, searching for mines dropped by B-29 Superfortress bombers. She was at Kure Naval Base at the time of the surrender of Japan.

On 5 October 1945, Namikaze was officially removed from navy list. However, after being demilitarized, she was pressed into service by the American occupation authorities for use as a repatriation ship, and continued in that role from 1 December 1945 until 1947 evacuating demilitarized Japanese soldiers and civilians from the Asian mainland.

== Service with the Republic of China ==
On 3 October 1947, ex-Namikaze was turned over to the Republic of China as a prize of war, and renamed Shen Yang. Shen Yang was based in Qingdao from 1947 until the fall of that port city to communist forces in the Chinese Civil War. She continued to be used by the Republic of China Navy from bases in Taiwan until 1960, when she was finally scrapped.
