= ROCS Shen Yang =

ROCS Shen Yang may refer to one of the following destroyers of the Republic of China Navy:

- ROCS Shen Yang (ex-Namikaze), the former Japanese Minekaze-class destroyer Namikaze; acquired by the Republic of China Navy as a war prize, October 1947; scrapped 1960
- ROCS Shen Yang (DDG-923), the former American Gearing-class destroyer USS Power (DD-839); acquired by the Republic of China Navy, October 1977; decommissioned, 2005; planned as a museum ship
