= Japanese destroyer Numakaze =

Destroyer of the Imperial Japanese Navy

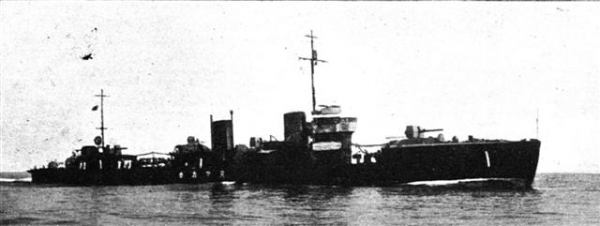
- Numakaze

History

Empire of Japan
- Name: Numakaze
- Ordered: 1918 fiscal year
- Builder: Maizuru Naval Arsenal
- Laid down: 10 August 1921
- Launched: 25 February 1922
- Commissioned: 24 July 1922
- Stricken: 5 February 1944
- Fate: Torpedoed and sunk on 18 December 1943

General characteristics
- Class & type: improved Minekaze-class destroyer
- Displacement: 1,215 long tons (1,234 t) normal, 1,650 long tons (1,680 t) full load
- Length: 97.5 m (320 ft) pp, 102.6 m (337 ft) overall
- Beam: 8.9 m (29 ft)
- Draught: 2.9 m (9.5 ft)
- Propulsion: 2-shaft Mitsubishi-Parsons geared turbines, 4 boilers 38,500 ihp (28,700 kW)
- Speed: 39 knots (72 km/h)
- Range: 3,600 nautical miles (6,700 km) at 14 knots (26 km/h)
- Complement: 148
- Armament: 4 × Type 3 120 mm 45 caliber naval gun; 6 × 21 in (533 mm) torpedo tubes (plus 2 reloads); 2 × 7.7 mm machine guns; 20 Type 1 naval mines

Service record
- Operations: Second Sino-Japanese War; Pacific War

Numakaze (沼風, Marsh Wind) was third and final vessel in the Nokaze subclass, an improvement to the Minekaze-class first class destroyers, built for the Imperial Japanese Navy immediately following World War I. Advanced for their time, these ships served as first-line destroyers through the 1930s, but were considered obsolescent by the start of the Pacific War.

== History ==
Construction of the large-sized Minekaze-class destroyers was authorized as part of the Imperial Japanese Navy's 8-4 Fleet Program from fiscal 1917, with nine vessels, and fiscal 1918 with an additional six vessels. However, the final three vessels in the fiscal year 1918 were built to a different design and have a different enough silhouette that many authors consider them to be a separate class. Numakaze, built at the Maizuru Naval Arsenal, was the third ship of this subclass. The destroyer was laid down on 10 August 1921, launched on 25 February 1922, and commissioned on 27 July 1922.

On completion, Numakaze was teamed with Namikaze, Nokaze, and flagship Kamikaze to form Destroyer Division 1 (第一駆逐艦). In 1938-1939, the division was assigned to patrols of the northern and central China coastlines in support of Japanese combat operations in the Second Sino-Japanese War

=== World War II history ===
At the time of the attack on Pearl Harbor, Numakaze was based at the Ōminato Guard District in northern Japan, and was assigned to patrols of the Hokkaidō and Chishima Islands coastlines.

During the Battle of Midway in May 1942, Numakaze was assigned to the reserve force for the Aleutian Islands Operation, which did not leave Japanese waters. Afterwards, she returned to patrol and escort duties based out of Ōminato through July 1943, when the ship was assigned temporarily to the IJN 5th Fleet for the mission to evacuate surviving Japanese forces from Kiska. On 6 June 1943, Numakaze suffered damage in a collision with the destroyer Shirakumo. Numakaze continued to be based at Ōminato for patrol and escort in northern waters until December 1943.

In December 1943, Numakaze was reassigned to the Combined Fleet, departing from Moji on 5 December as part of the 1st Surface Escort Division escorting a convoy to Taiwan. However, on 18 December 1943, Numakaze, while chasing the wake of the submarine USS Grayback, was hit by a torpedo, blew up, and sank east-northeast of Naha, Okinawa, at position 26°29′N 128°26′E. The destroyer was lost with all hands, including the commanding officer of DesDiv 1, Commander Watanabe Yasumasa.

On 5 February 1944, Numakaze was removed from navy list.
