= JS Matsuyuki =

Asagiri-class destroyer

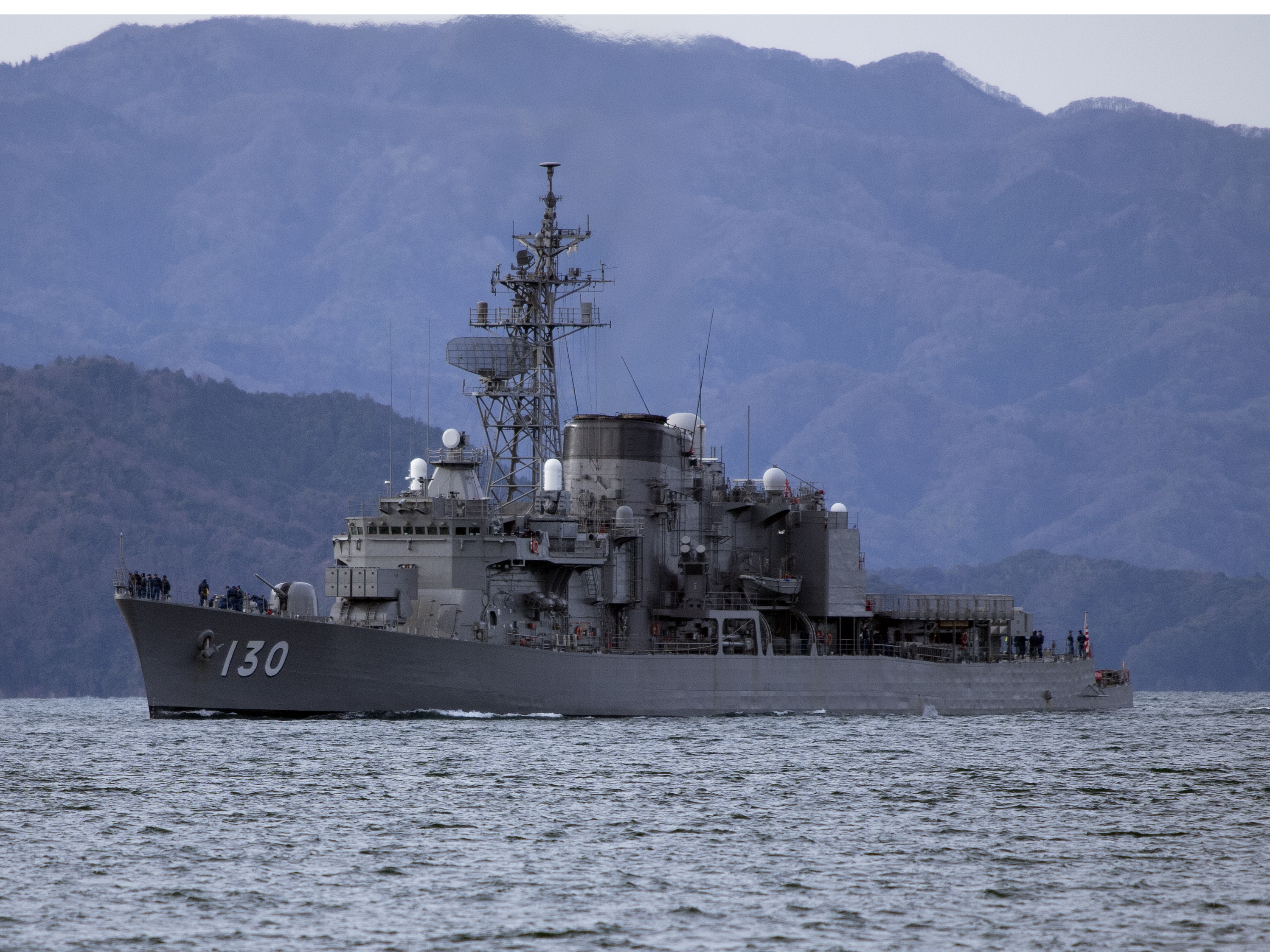
- JS Matsuyuki at Maizuru on 26 January 2020

History

Japan
- Name: Matsuyuki; (まつゆき)
- Ordered: 1981
- Builder: IHI, Tokyo
- Laid down: 7 April 1983
- Launched: 25 October 1984
- Commissioned: 19 March 1986
- Decommissioned: 7 April 2021
- Home port: Maizuru
- Identification: MMSI number: 431999541; Callsign: JSSM; Pennant number: DD-130
- Status: Retired

General characteristics
- Class & type: Hatsuyuki-class destroyer
- Displacement: 2,950 tons standard, 4,000 tons hull load
- Length: 130 m (430 ft)
- Beam: 13.6 m (44 ft 7 in)
- Draft: 4.2 m (13 ft 9 in); 4.4 m (14 ft 5 in) (DD 129 to DD 132)
- Propulsion: 2 × KHI-RR TM3B gas turbines, 45,000 shp (34 MW); 2 × KHI-RR RM1C gas turbines, 9,900 shp (7.4 MW); 2 shafts, variable-pitch propellers
- Speed: 30 knots (35 mph; 56 km/h)
- Complement: 200
- Sensors & processing systems: OYQ-5 tactical data system; FCS-2 fire-control system; OPS-14 air search radar; OPS-18 surface search radar; OQS-4 hull sonar; OQR-1 TASS (in some ships)
- Electronic warfare & decoys: NOLR-6C intercept; OLT-3 jammer; Mark 36 SRBOC; Towed torpedo decoys
- Armament: 1 × OTO Melara 76 mm gun; 2 × 20 mm Phalanx CIWS; 2 × Harpoon SSM quad canisters; 1 × Sea Sparrow SAM octuple launcher; 1 × ASROC octuple launcher; 2 × triple 324 mm torpedo tubes
- Aircraft carried: 1 × HSS-2B or SH-60J helicopter

JS Matsuyuki (DD-130) is a Hatsuyuki-class destroyer of the Japan Maritime Self-Defense Force.

== Development and design ==
The Hatsuyuki class were designed as multi-purpose ships, with a balanced armament and sensor fit, so that the ships could carry out anti-submarine and anti-surface ship operations while being capable of defending themselves against air attack. A hangar and flight deck are carried for a single helicopter, which was initially the Mitsubishi HSS-2, a license-built Sikorsky Sea King, later replaced by Mitsubishi H-60s (licensed Sikorsky S-70s), with the Canadian Beartrap haul-down system fitted to ease operations of large helicopters.

An octuple Mk 112 launcher for ASROC anti-submarine missiles is fitted forward, while additional close-in anti-submarine armament is provided by two triple 324-mm torpedo-tubes for Mark 46 anti-submarine torpedoes.

The initial anti-aircraft armament consisted of a Sea Sparrow surface-to-air missile launcher aft, with an OTO Melara 76 mm gun forward. Eight Harpoon anti-ship missiles are carried in two quadruple mounts abaft the ship's funnel.

== Construction and career ==
Matsuyuki was laid down on 20 January 1987 and launched on 4 June 1988 by Hitachi Zosen Corporation, Maizuru. She was commissioned on 31 January 1990.

JS Kashima and JS Shimayuki departed from Ōminato base at about 11:05 am after leaving Ōminato base at 9:00 am on 15 April 2012, about eight kilometres (5.0 mi) north-northeast of the Natsumari Peninsula in Rikuoku Bay. Maritime Self-Defense Force 21st Air Group 25th Air Corps (Ōminato) patrol helicopter SH-60J (No. 8279) (Captain Masahiko Miyanaga 3) touched the main rotor to the side wall of the left vault of Matsuyuki and crashed. In this incident, Masahiko Miyanaga was killed, and Matsuyuki also damaged the side wall of the port hangar, and after transferring the training executive to Kashima, she left the training fleet for repair, but for about two weeks. After repairing, the destroyer rejoined the training fleet again.

From 15 January to 2 March 2016, she participated in the International Fleet Review Ceremony sponsored by the Indian Navy and the Japan-US-Australia Joint Overseas Cruise Training.

She was retired on 7 April 2021.

== Gallery ==
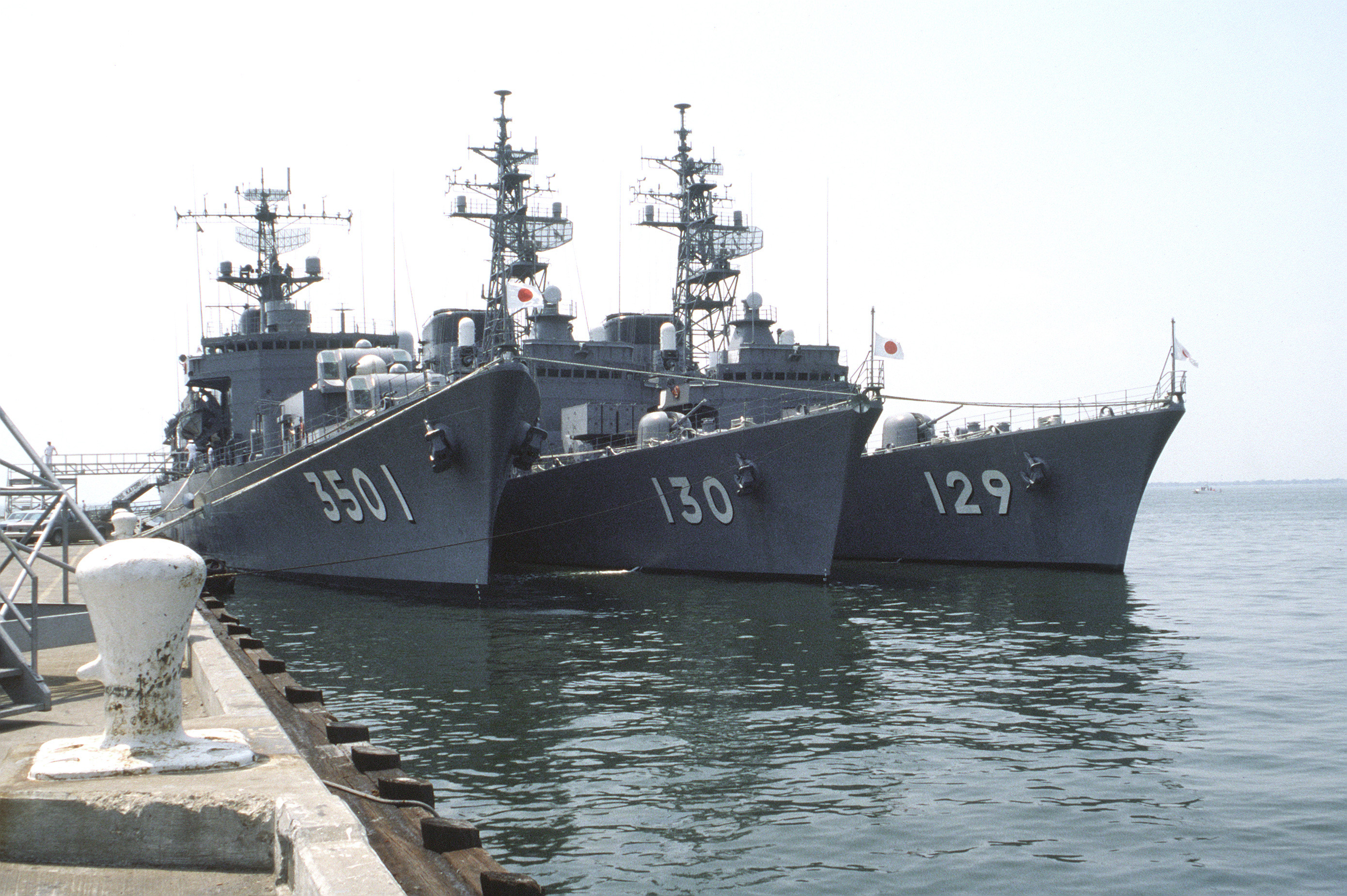
JS Katori, JS Matsuyuki and JS Yamayuki at Norfolk on 30 July 1987.

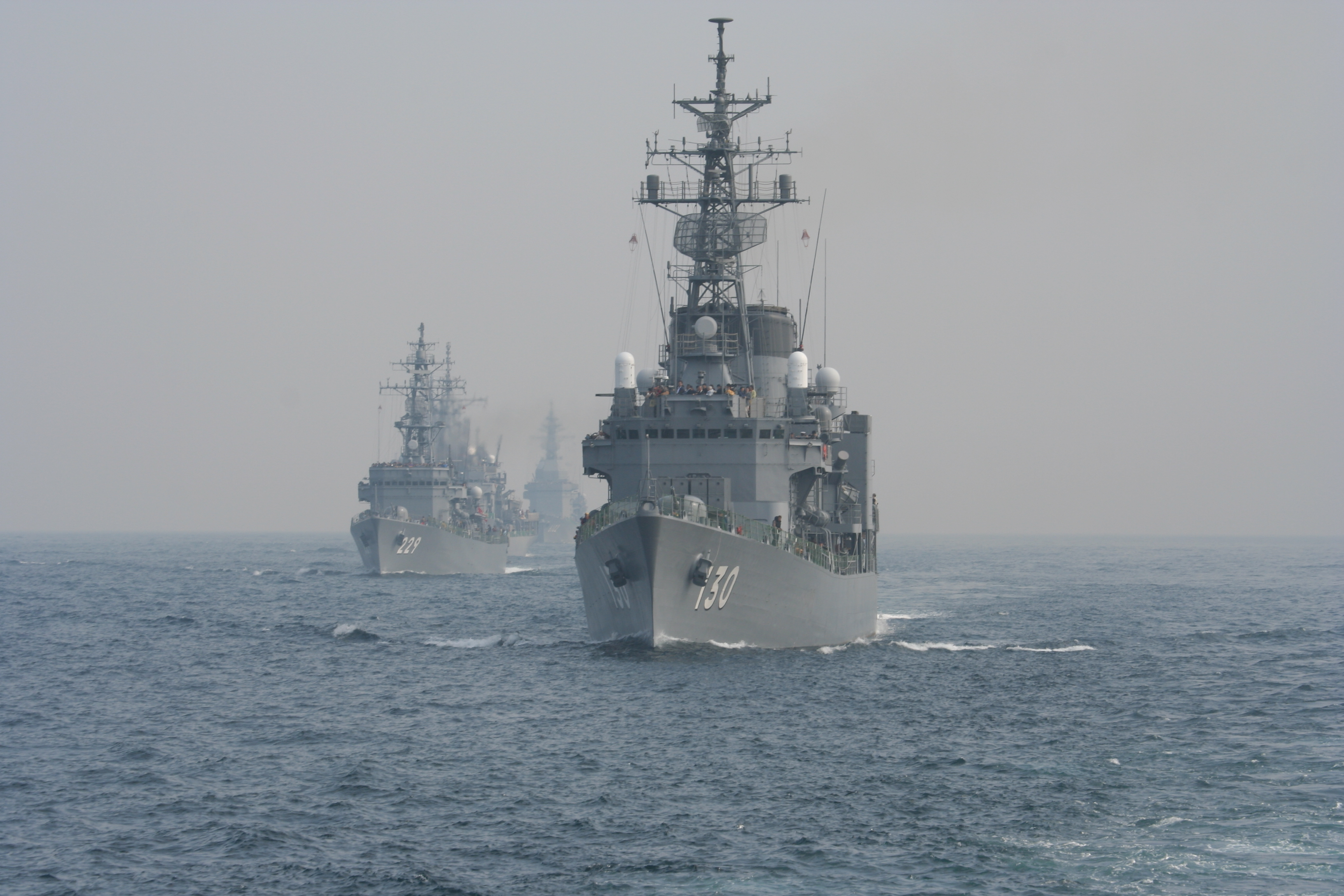
JS Matsuyuki and JS Abukuma on 29 October 2006.

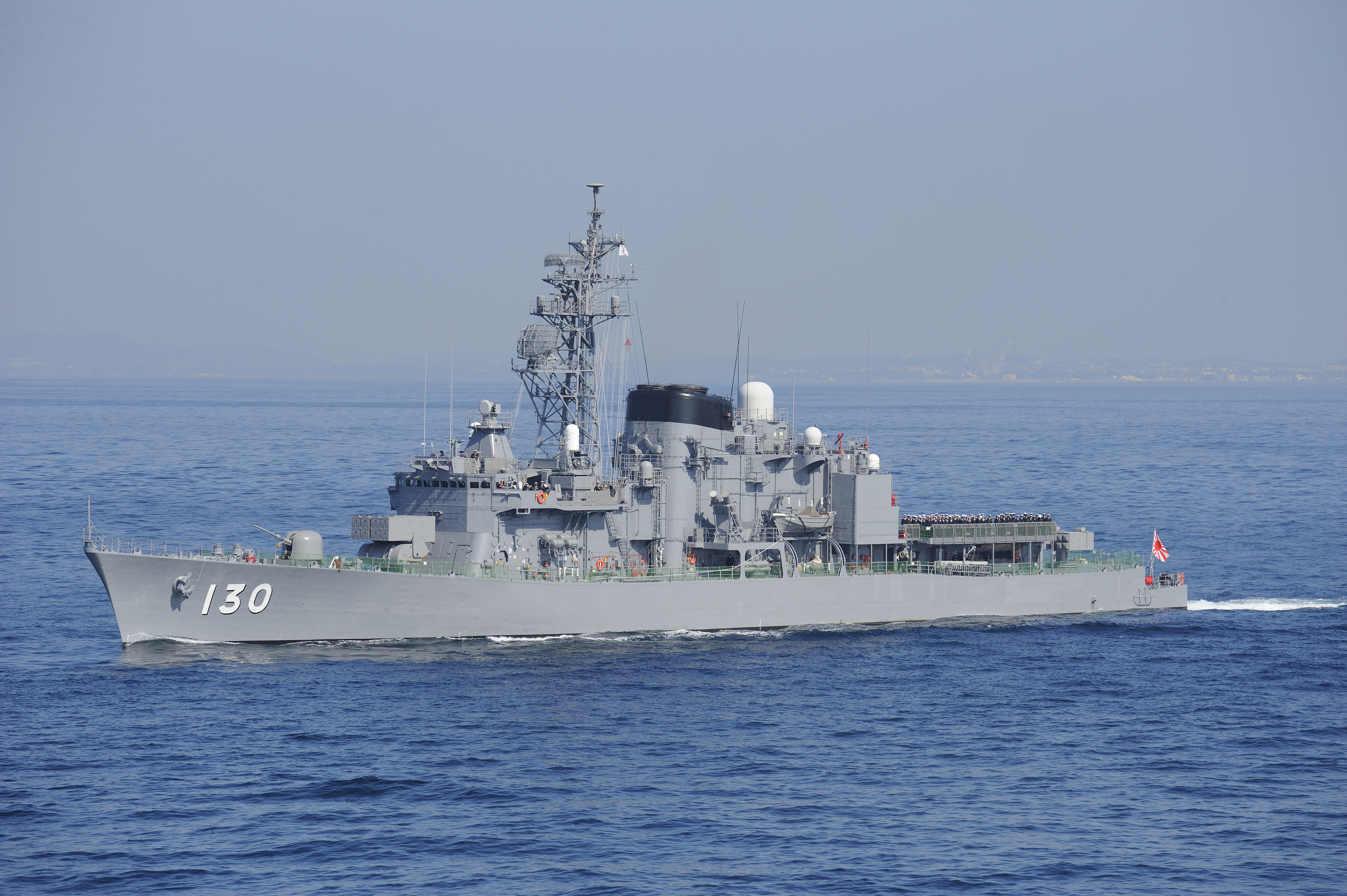
JS Matsuyuki at the Sagami Bay on 21 October 2009.

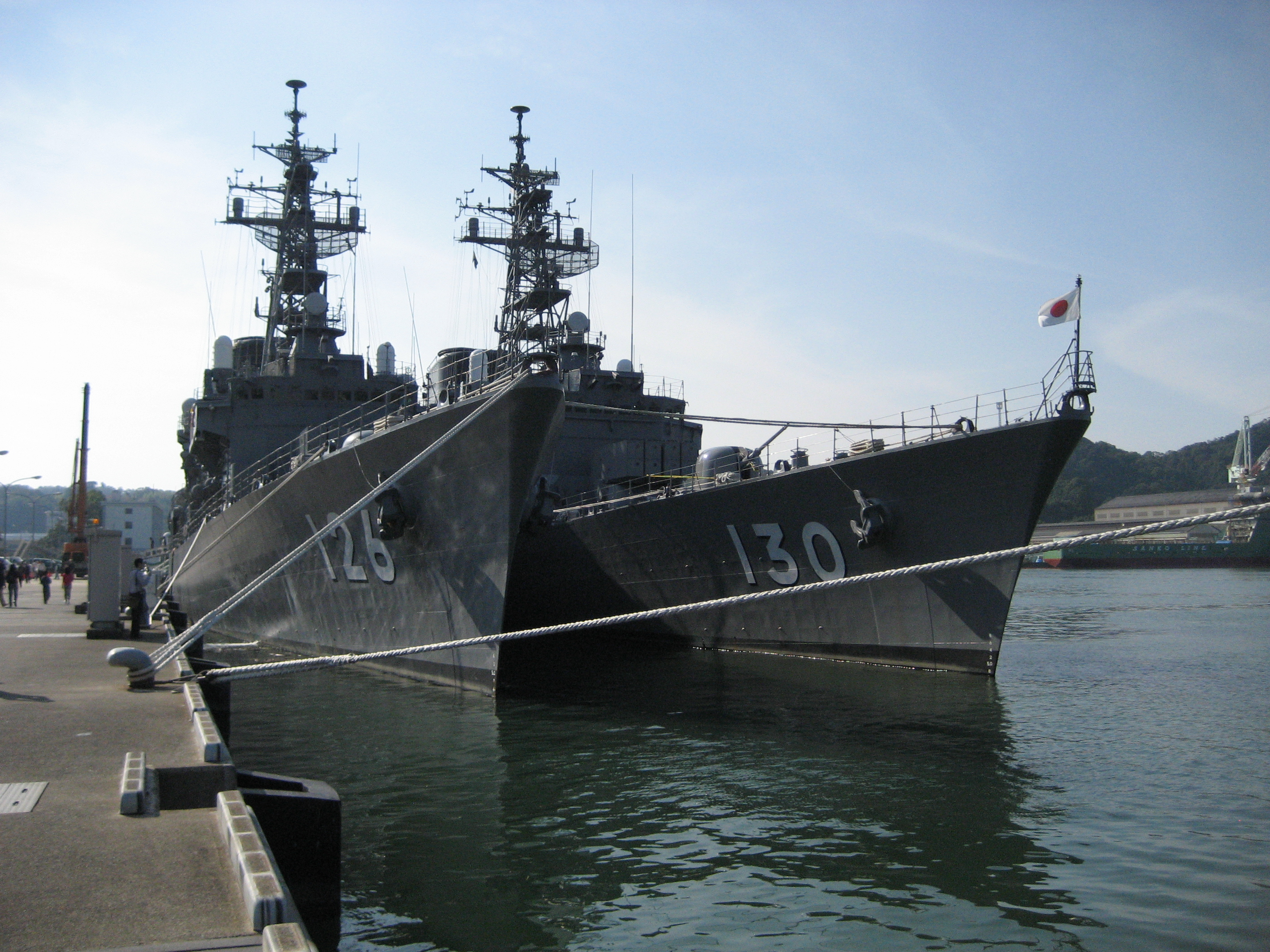
JS Matsuyuki and JS Hamayuki at Maizuru on 9 October 2011.

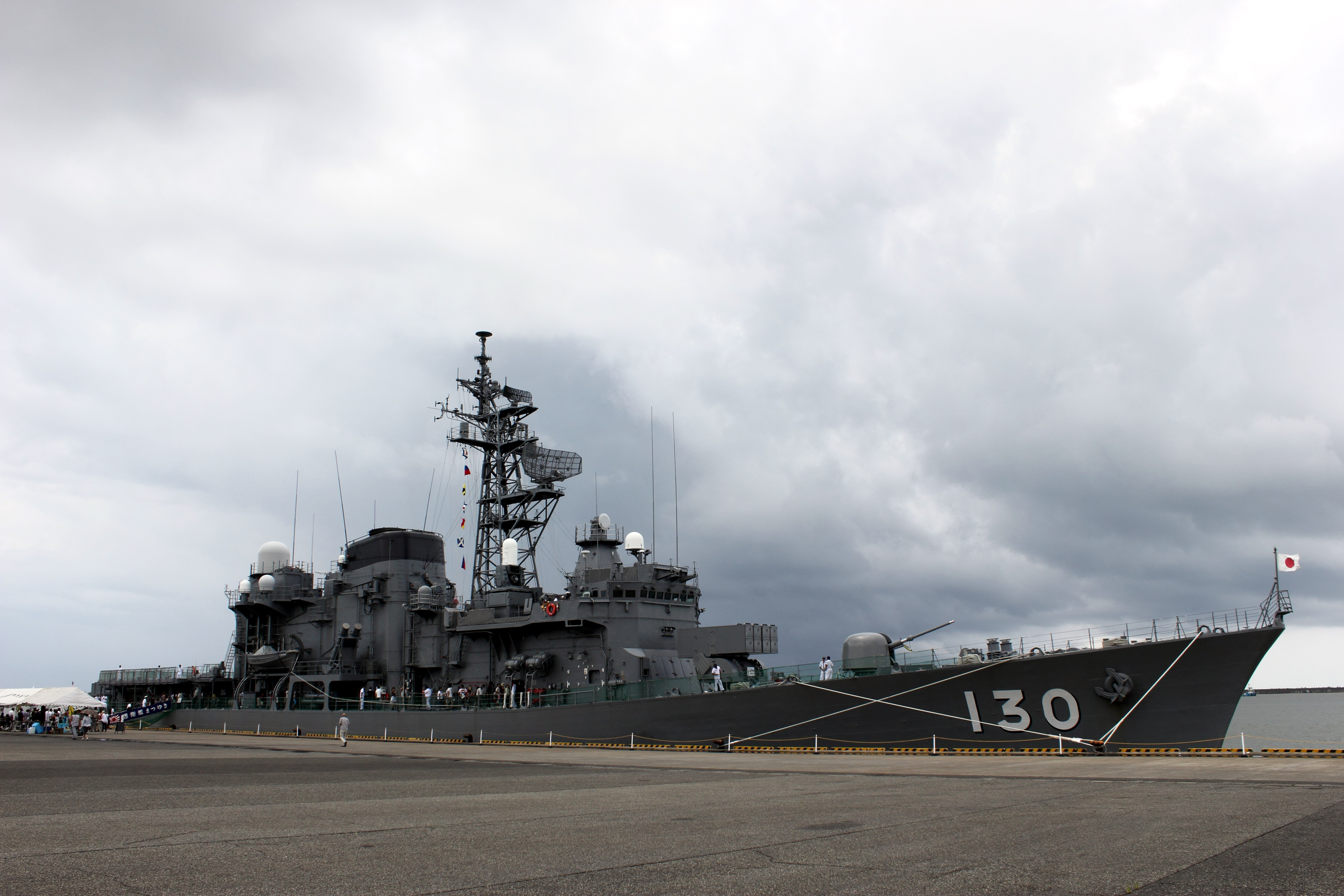
JS Matsuyuki on 24 August 2013.

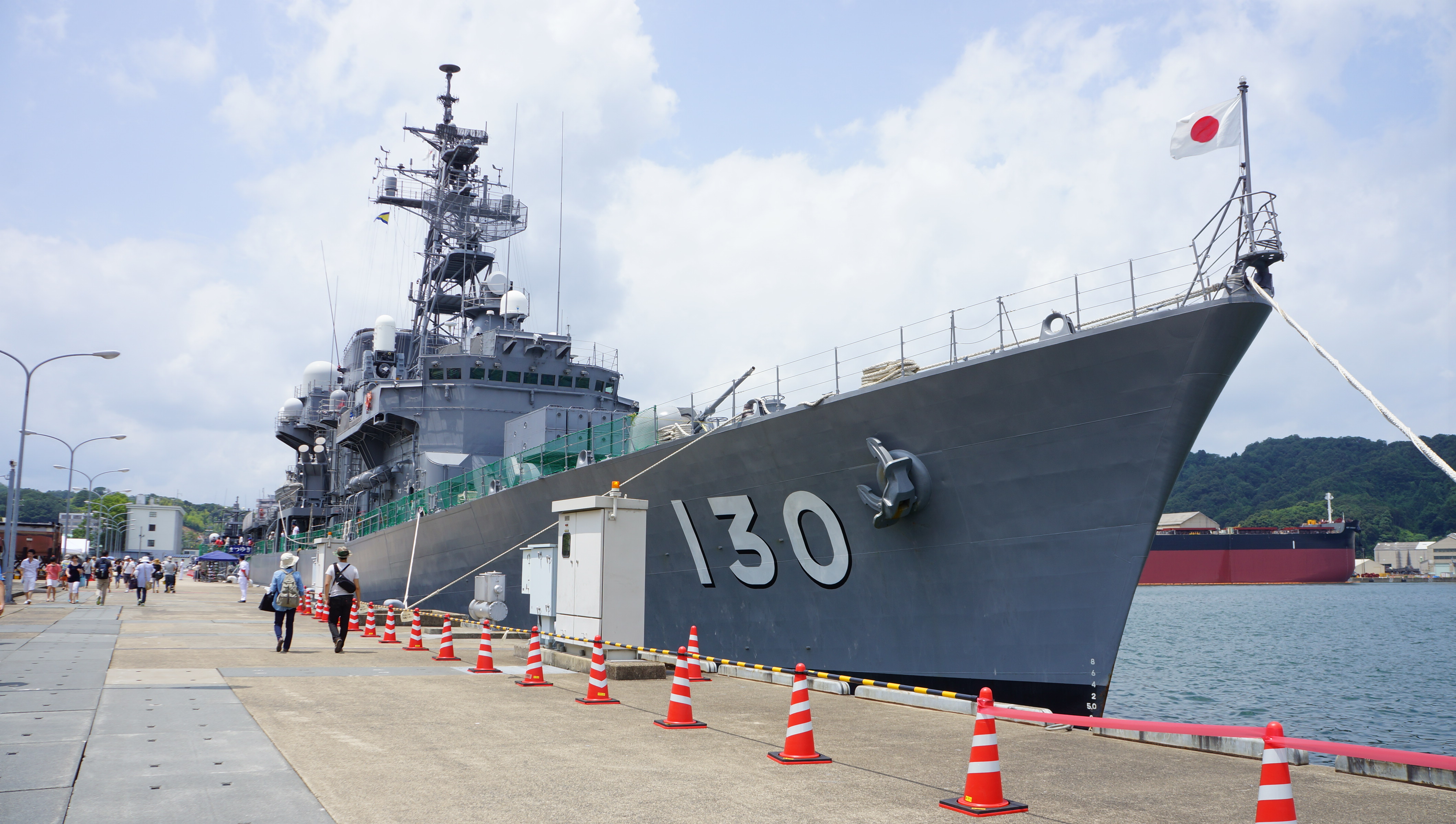
JS Matsuyuki at Maizuru on 27 July 2014.

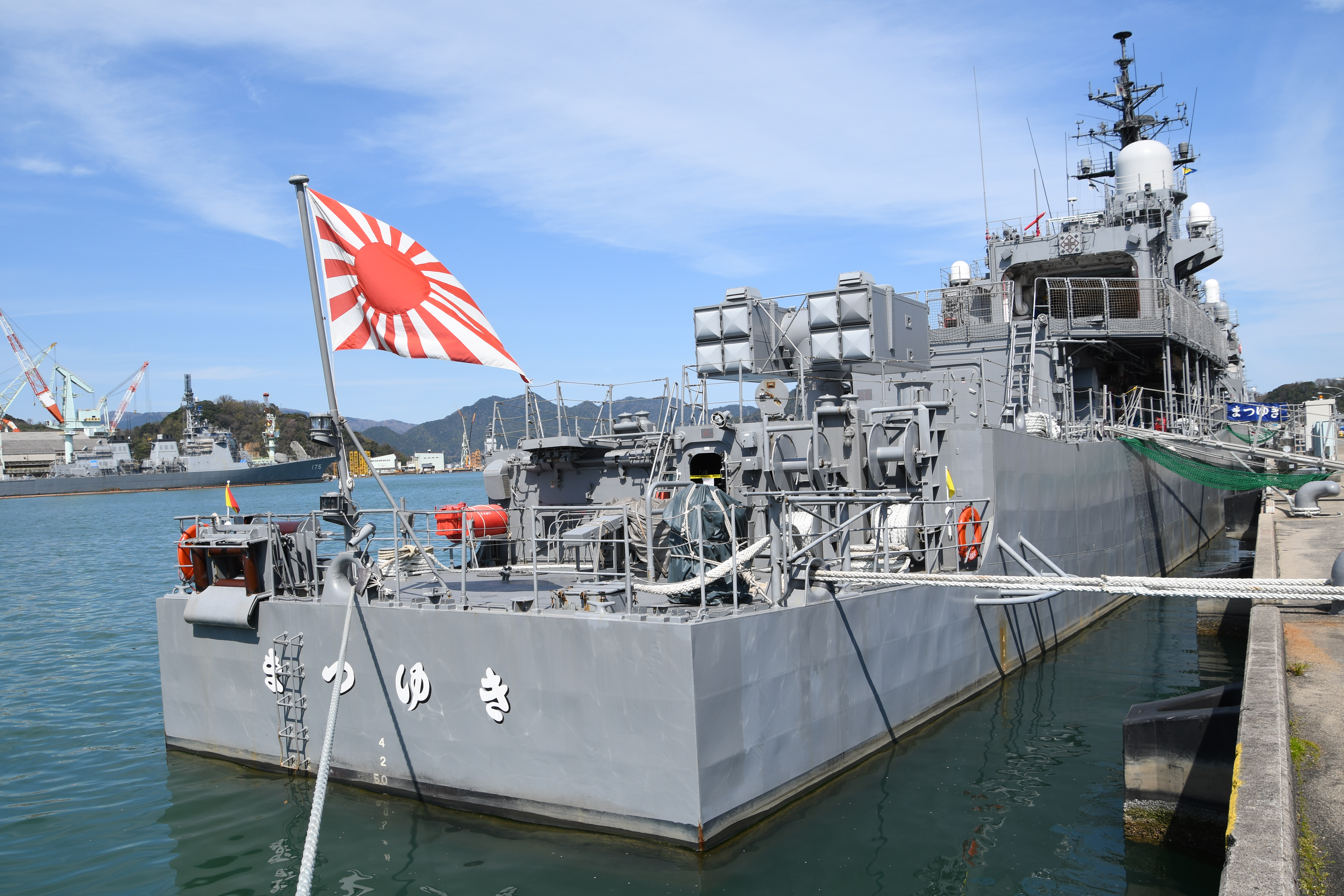
JS Matsuyuki at Maizuru on 13 April 2019.

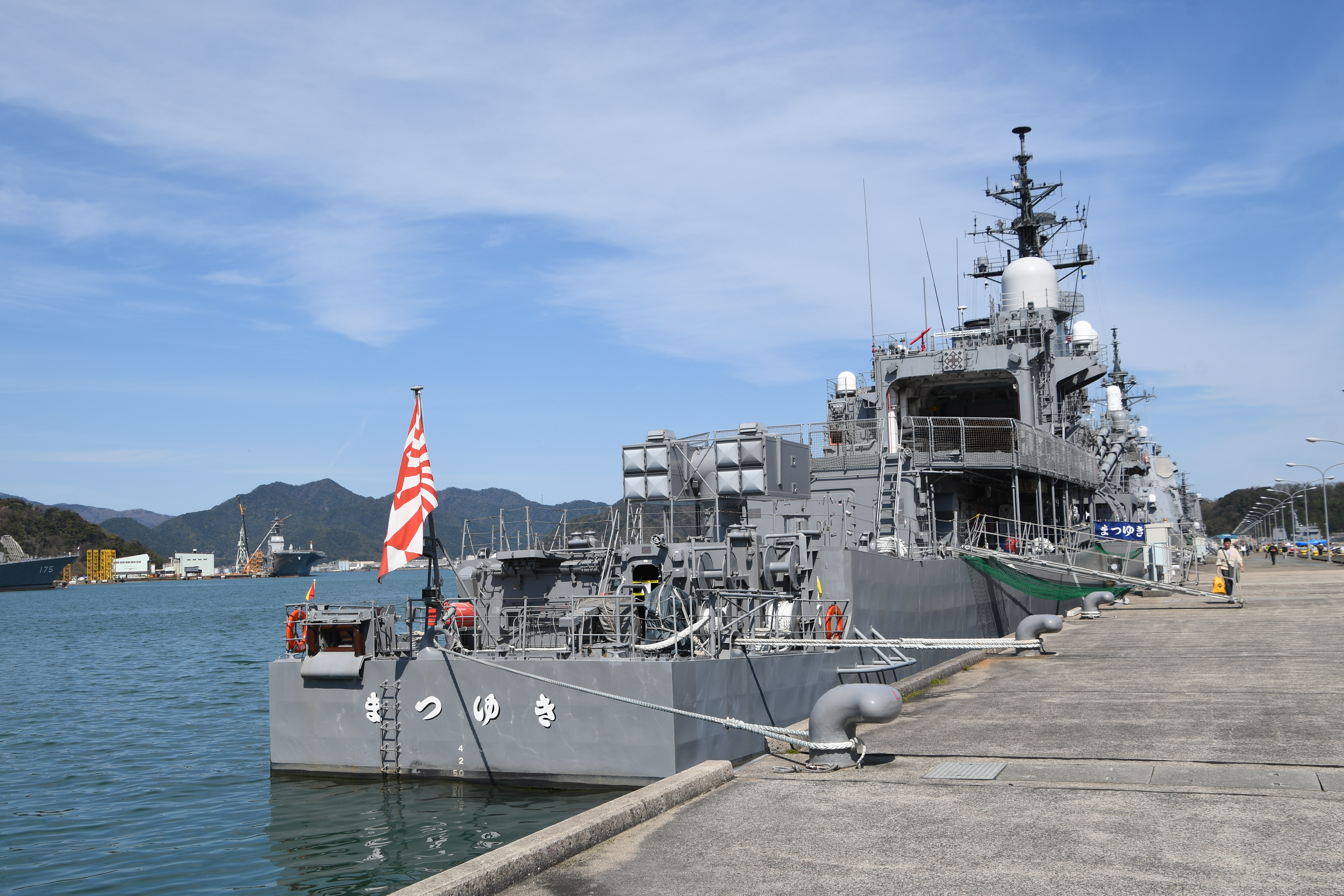
JS Matsuyuki at Maizuru on 13 April 2019.

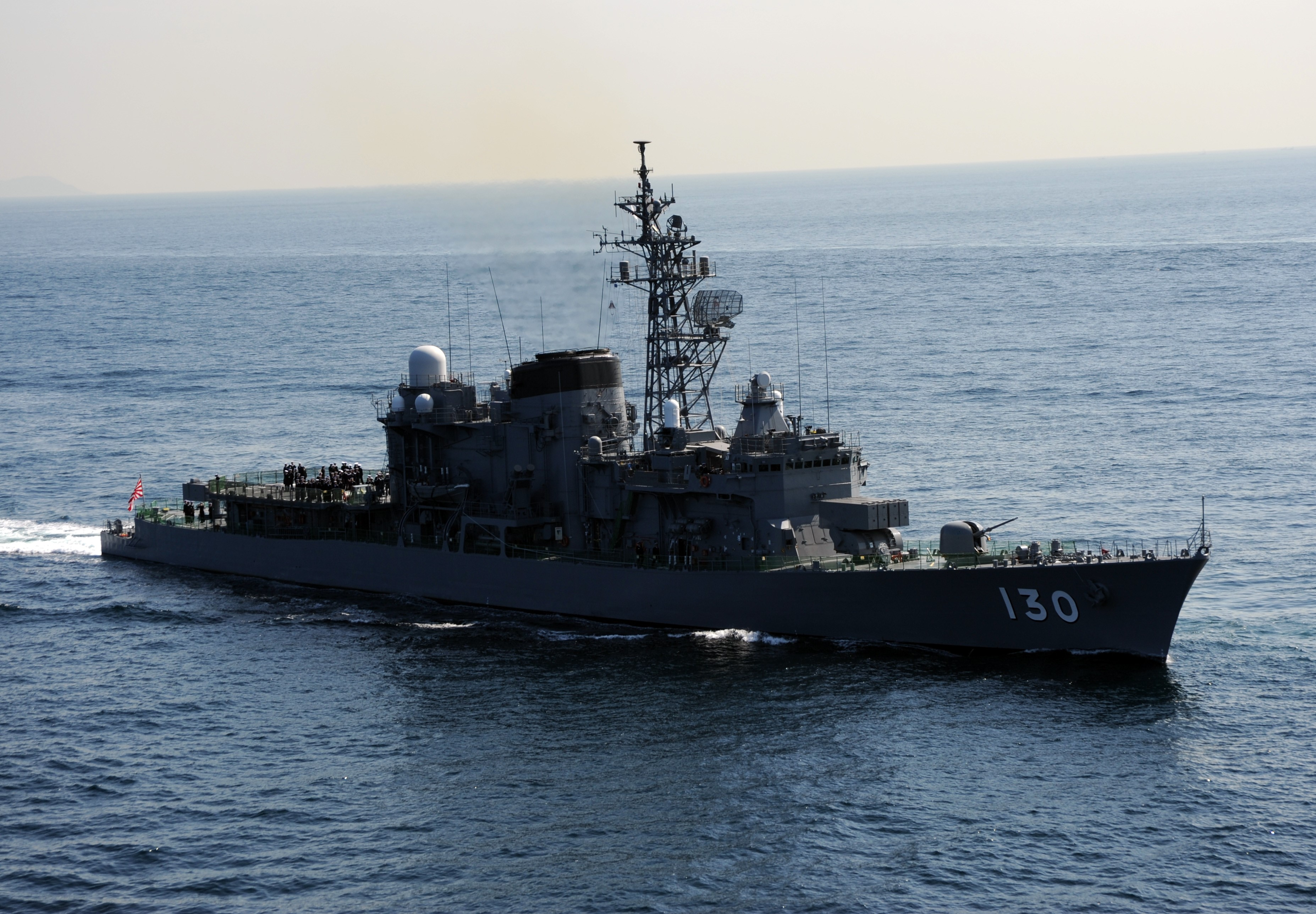
JS Matsuyuki underway on 10 February 2020.
