= Japanese ship Abukuma =

At least two warships of Japan have borne the name Abukuma:

- Japanese cruiser Abukuma, was a Nagara-class cruiser launched in 1923 and sunk in 1944
- JS Abukuma, is an Abukuma-class destroyer escort launched in 1988
