= Japanese transport ship Hakuyo Maru (1942) =

History

Empire of Japan
- Name: Hakuyo Maru
- Builder: Mitsubishi Heavy Industries, Ltd., Kobe
- Laid down: 3 July 1941
- Launched: 29 August 1942
- Sponsored by: Osaka Merchant Shipping Co., Ltd., Osaka
- Completed: 29 December 1942
- Identification: 49541
- Fate: Sunk, 25 October 1944
- Notes: Call sign: JFWB

General characteristics
- Type: transport ship
- Tonnage: 5,742 grt (16,260 m^{3}) standard
- Length: 112.95 m (370 ft 7 in) o/a
- Beam: 18.50 m (60 ft 8 in)
- Draught: 10.11 m (33 ft 2 in)
- Installed power: 2,000 hp (1,491 kW)

Hakuyo Maru (Japanese: 白陽丸) was a Japanese transport ship of during World War II.

== History ==
She was laid down on 3 July 1941 at the Kobe shipyard of Mitsubishi Heavy Industries, Ltd. for the benefit of Osaka Merchant Shipping Co., Ltd., Osaka. She was launched on 29 August 1942 and completed on 29 December 1942.

23 October 1944, she left Kataoka Bay Naval Base, Shimushu Island, Kuril Islands for Otaru in convoy WO-303 along with transports Hokoku Maru and Umegawa Maru escorted by the destroyer Kamikaze and Etorofu-class escort ship Fukue. The transports are filled with naval personnel and fishery workers being removed to the homeland for the winter from the islands of Shimushu and Paramushiro.

On 25 October 1944, she was torpedoed and sunk by the submarine USS Seal at 50°21′N 150°20′E west of the Kuril Islands. She sank quickly in the frigid waters with 1,451 lives lost including 1,312 passengers. Seal evaded depth charge attacks by the escorts and the remainder of the convoy reached Otaru safely.
