= Japanese destroyer Nokaze =

Destroyer of the Imperial Japanese Navy

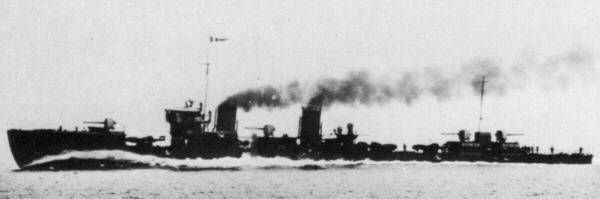
- Nokaze in February 1922

History

Empire of Japan
- Name: Nokaze
- Ordered: 1918 fiscal year
- Builder: Maizuru Naval Arsenal
- Laid down: 16 April 1921
- Launched: 1 October 1921
- Commissioned: 31 March 1922
- Stricken: 10 April 1945
- Fate: Torpedoed and sunk on 20 February 1945

General characteristics
- Class & type: improved Minekaze-class destroyer
- Displacement: 1,215 long tons (1,234 t) normal, 1,650 long tons (1,680 t) full load
- Length: 97.5 m (320 ft) pp, 102.6 m (337 ft) overall
- Beam: 8.9 m (29 ft)
- Draught: 2.9 m (9.5 ft)
- Propulsion: 2-shaft Mitsubishi-Parsons geared turbines, 4 boilers 38,500 ihp (28,700 kW)
- Speed: 39 knots (72 km/h)
- Range: 3,600 nautical miles (6,700 km) at 14 knots (26 km/h)
- Complement: 148
- Armament: 4 × Type 3 120 mm 45 caliber naval gun; 6 × 21 in (533 mm) torpedo tubes; 2 × 7.7 mm machine guns; 20 × naval mines

Service record
- Operations: Second Sino-Japanese War; Pacific War

Nokaze (野風, Field Wind) was the lead ship of the Nokaze subclass, an improvement to the Minekaze-class first-class destroyers built for the Imperial Japanese Navy following World War I. Advanced for their time, these ships served as first-line destroyers through the 1930s, but were considered obsolescent by the start of the Pacific War.

== History ==
Construction of the large-sized Minekaze-class destroyers was authorized as part of the Imperial Japanese Navy's 8-4 Fleet Program from fiscal 1917, with nine vessels, and fiscal 1918 with an additional six vessels. However, the final three vessels in the fiscal year 1918 were built to a different design and have a different enough silhouette that many authors consider them to be a separate class. Nokaze, built at the Maizuru Naval Arsenal, was laid down on 16 April 1921, launched on 1 October 1921, and commissioned on 31 March 1922.

On completion, Nokaze was teamed with sister ships Namikaze, Numakaze, and flagship Kamikaze at Yokosuka Naval District to form Destroyer Division 1. In 1938–1939, this division was assigned to patrols of the northern and central China coastlines in support of Japanese combat operations in the Second Sino-Japanese War

=== World War II history ===
At the time of the attack on Pearl Harbor, Nokaze was based at the Ōminato Guard District in northern Japan and was assigned to patrols of the Hokkaidō and Chishima Islands coastlines.

During the Battle of Midway in May 1942, Nokaze was assigned to the reserve force for the Aleutian Islands Operation, which did not leave Japanese waters. Afterwards, she returned to patrol and escort duties based out of Ōminato through July 1943, when she was assigned temporarily to the IJN 5th Fleet for the mission to evacuate surviving Japanese forces from "Operation Cottage" (the evacuation of Kiska). Nokaze continued to be based at Ōminato for patrol and escort in northern waters until January 1945.

In January 1945, Nokaze was reassigned to the Combined Fleet, departing from Moji on 26 January with Convoy HI-91 bound for Singapore. However, Nokaze was ordered to Mako, where it was to join the destroyer screen for the battleships Ise, and Hyūga during Operation Kita. However, on 15 February, there was a change of plans, and Nokaze was ordered to proceed instead to Singapore on its own.

On 20 February 1945, Nokaze was torpedoed by the submarine USS Pargo north of Nha Trang, French Indochina, in the South China Sea at position 12°48′N 109°38′E. The ship exploded and sank, with 209 killed. Kamikaze rescued 21 survivors, including her captain, Lieutenant Commander Tarō Ebihara. Nokaze was the last of 39 Japanese destroyers sunk by United States Navy submarines during the war.

On 10 April 1945 Nokaze was removed from navy list.
