= Japanese destroyer Kamikaze (1922) =

Destroyer of the Imperial Japanese Navy

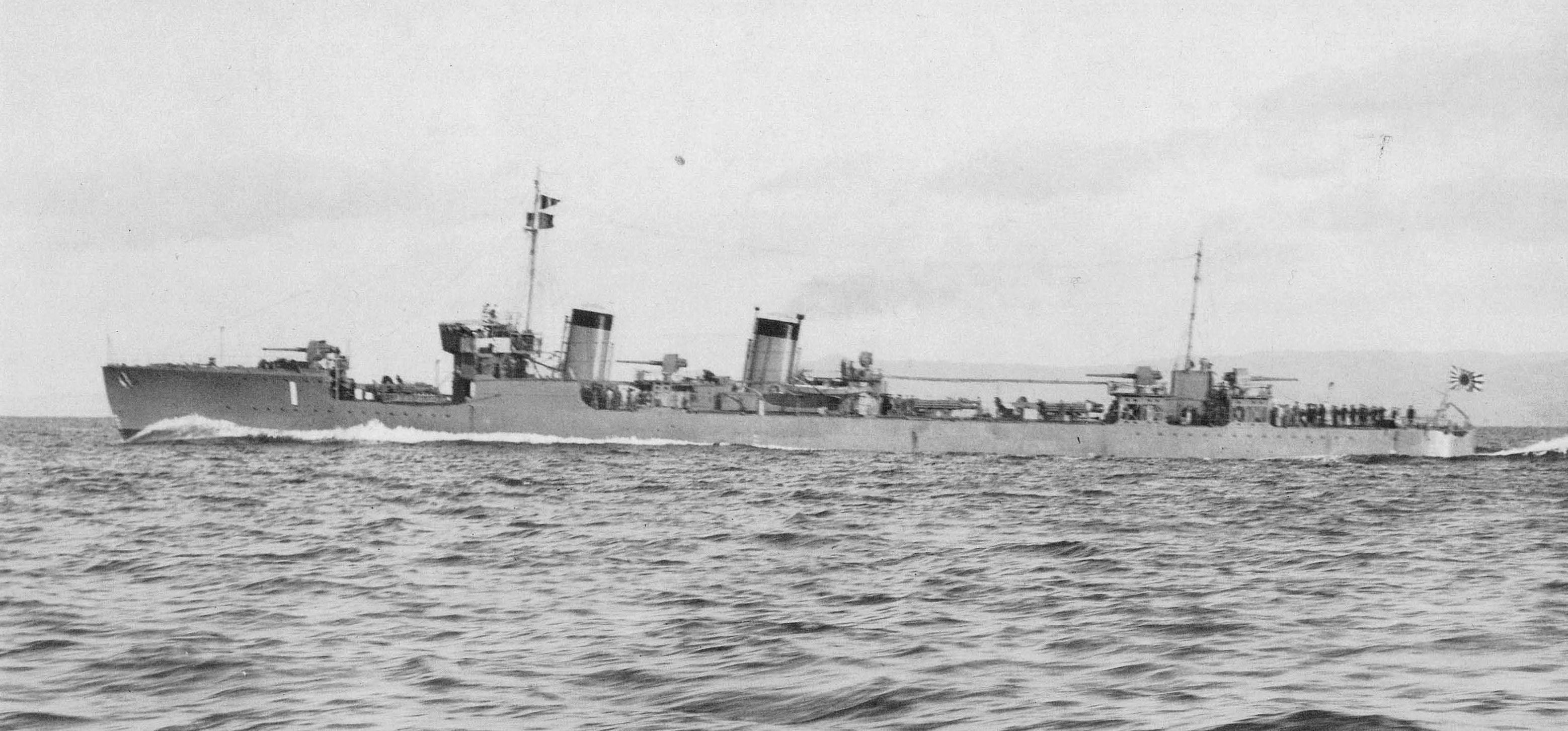
- Kamikaze underway on 23 December 1922

History

Empire of Japan
- Name: Kamikaze
- Builder: Mitsubishi, Nagasaki
- Laid down: 15 December 1921 as Destroyer No. 1
- Launched: 25 September 1922
- Completed: 19 December 1922
- Renamed: Kamikaze, 1 August 1928
- Stricken: 5 October 1945
- Fate: Wrecked, 7 June 1946; Scrapped, 1947

General characteristics
- Class & type: Kamikaze-class destroyer
- Displacement: 1,422 t (1,400 long tons) (normal); 1,747 t (1,719 long tons) (deep load)
- Length: 97.5 m (319 ft 11 in) (pp); 102.5 m (336 ft 3 in) (o/a)
- Beam: 9.1 m (29 ft 10 in)
- Draft: 2.9 m (9 ft 6 in)
- Installed power: 38,500 shp (28,700 kW); 4 × Kampon water-tube boilers
- Propulsion: 2 shafts; 2 × Kampon geared steam turbines
- Speed: 37.3 knots (69.1 km/h; 42.9 mph)
- Range: 3,600 nmi (6,700 km; 4,100 mi) at 14 knots (26 km/h; 16 mph)
- Complement: 148
- Armament: 4 × single 12 cm (4.7 in) Type 3 guns; 3 × twin 53.3 cm (21.0 in) torpedo tubes

Service record
- Part of: Destroyer Division 1
- Operations: Battle of the Malacca Strait

The Japanese destroyer Kamikaze (神風, "Divine Wind" or "Spirit Wind") was the lead ship of nine Kamikaze-class destroyers built for the Imperial Japanese Navy (IJN) during the 1920s. At the beginning of the Pacific War in December 1941, the ship was assigned to the Ōminato Guard District. She remained in northern Japanese waters until mid-1942 when she participated in the Aleutian Islands Campaign. Kamikaze continued to patrol northern Japanese waters until early 1945 when she was transferred to the Singapore area.

== Design and description ==
The Kamikaze class was an improved version of the Minekaze-class destroyers. The ships had an overall length of 102.5 meters (336 ft 3 in) and were 97.5 meters (319 ft 11 in) between perpendiculars. They had a beam of 9.1 meters (29 ft 10 in), and a mean draft of 2.9 meters (9 ft 6 in). The Kamikaze-class ships displaced 1,422 metric tons (1,400 long tons) at standard load and 1,747 metric tons (1,719 long tons) at deep load. They were powered by two Parsons geared steam turbines, each driving one propeller shaft, using steam provided by four Kampon water-tube boilers. The turbines were designed to produce 38,500 shaft horsepower (28,700 kW), which would propel the ships at 37.3 knots (69.1 km/h; 42.9 mph). During sea trials, the ships comfortably exceeded their designed speeds, reaching 38.7 to 39.2 knots (71.7 to 72.6 km/h; 44.5 to 45.1 mph). The ships carried 420 metric tons (413 long tons) of fuel oil which gave them a range of 3,600 nautical miles (6,700 km; 4,100 mi) at 14 knots (26 km/h; 16 mph). Their crew consisted of 148 officers and crewmen.

The main armament of the Kamikaze-class ships consisted of four 12-centimeter (4.7 in) Type 3 guns in single mounts; one gun forward of the superstructure, one between the two funnels and the last pair back to back atop the aft superstructure. The guns were numbered '1' to '4' from front to rear. The ships carried three above-water twin sets of 53.3-centimeter (21.0 in) torpedo tubes; one mount was between the forward superstructure and the forward gun and the other two were between the aft funnel and aft superstructure.

Early in the war, the No. 4 gun and the aft torpedo tubes were removed in exchange for four depth charge throwers and 18 depth charges. In addition 10 license-built 25 mm (0.98 in) Type 96 light AA guns were installed. These changes increased their displacement to 1,499 long tons (1,523 t). Survivors had their light AA armament augmented to be between thirteen and twenty 25 mm guns and four 13.2 mm (0.5 in) Type 93 anti-aircraft machineguns by June 1944. These changes reduced their speed to 35 knots (65 km/h; 40 mph).

== Construction and career ==
Kamikaze, built by Mitsubishi at their shipyard in Nagasaki, was laid down on 15 December 1921, launched on 25 September 1922 and completed on 19 December. Originally commissioned simply as Destroyer No. 1, she was assigned the name Kamikaze on 1 August 1928. On completion, Kamikaze was assigned to Destroyer Division 1, based in the Ōminato Guard District and charged with the defense of Japan’s northern waters.

=== Pacific War ===
At the time of the attack on Pearl Harbor, Kamikaze was still based at Ōminato, and was assigned to patrols from the Chishima Islands to the southern coasts of Hokkaidō. In June 1942, Kamikaze helped provide cover for the Japanese forces during Operation AL, the diversionary invasion of the Aleutian Islands during the Battle of Midway. Following the Aleutian Islands Campaign, Kamikaze patrolled from Hokkaidō through the Aleutians through the end of the year. Throughout 1943 and 1944, she was assigned to patrols of Soya Strait and Tsugaru Strait and to escort ship convoys to remote outposts in the Kurile islands.

On 23 October 1944, she left Kataoka Bay Naval Base, Shimushu Island, Kuril Islands for Otaru in convoy WO-303 consisting of transports Hakuyo Maru, Hokoku Maru, and Umegawa Maru, and Etorofu-class escort ship Fukue. The transports were filled with naval personnel and fishery workers being removed to the homeland for the winter from the islands of Shimushu and Paramushiro. On 25 October 1944, the convoy was attacked by the submarine USS Seal. Hakuyo Maru was torpedoed and sunk west of the Kuril Islands with 1,415 lives lost. The Seal evaded depth charging by Kamikaze and Fukue and the remainder of the convoy reached Otaru unharmed.

However, from January 1945, Kamikaze was reassigned to the Combined Fleet and relocated to Moji in Kyūshū. On 26 January 1945, she departed with a convoy from Moji bound for Singapore, but was assigned detached duty at the Mako in the Pescadores. On 14 February she formed part of the escort for both Ise-class battleships which were sailing from Singapore to Japan as part of Operation Kita. On 20 February, she rescued the survivors of the torpedoed destroyer Nokaze, continuing on to Singapore by 22 February.

In May 1945, Kamikaze sortied twice from Singapore as escort to the cruiser Haguro on emergency transport missions to the beleaguered Japanese garrison in the Andaman Islands. During the second sortie, on 16 May, Haguro was sunk in surface action with the Royal Navy, and Kamikaze suffered 27 crewmen killed and 14 injured in battle with the British destroyer group. Damage to the ship was light, and Kamikaze rescued 320 survivors from Haguro before returning to Singapore.

In June 1945, Kamikaze sortied from Singapore to Batavia as escort to the cruiser Ashigara. During the return voyage on June 8, Ashigara was torpedoed, and Kamikaze rescued 853 crewmen and 400 soldiers before returning to Singapore. Later that month, as Kamikaze was escorting the tanker Tōhō Maru to French Indochina, Tōhō Maru was sunk in an attack by United States Army Air Forces B-24 Liberator bombers, and Kamikaze rescued 200 survivors.

Kamikaze successfully completed several more escort operations through the remainder of June and July. Notably, she engaged the submarine USS Hawkbill on July 18. The submarine attempted to torpedo a convoy off the coast of Malaya. The torpedoes missed and Kamikaze gave chase, dropping several depth charges that severely damaged the submarine and partially blew her out of the water. Hawkbill was able to get away, and after the war the ships' captains, Hitoshi Kasuga and Worth M. Scanland exchanged letters praising each other. At the time of the surrender of Japan, she was still based in Singapore, and was turned over to British authorities there.

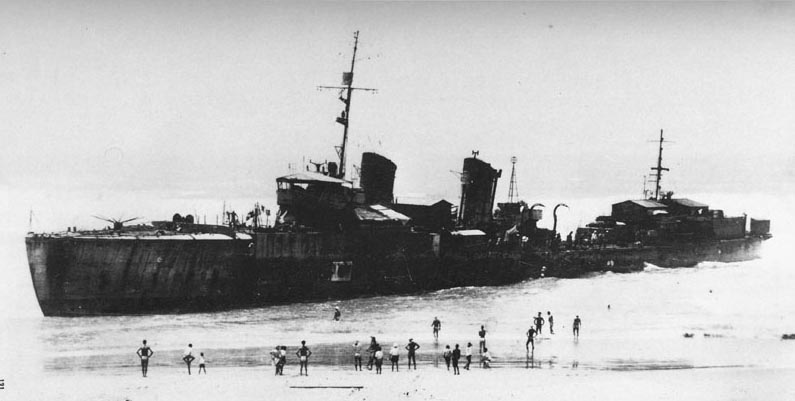
The hulked Kamikaze after WW2, June 1946

=== Post-war ===
Kamikaze was struck from the Navy List on 5 October 1945. She was subsequently demilitarized and used as a repatriation vessel returning Japanese military personnel back to the Japanese home islands from Singapore, Bangkok and Saigon in late 1945 and early 1946. Kamikaze ran aground and was wrecked on 7 June 1946 while coming to the rescue of former Kunashiri, another repatriation vessel, off Cape Omaezaki, Shizuoka Prefecture at coordinates 34°38′N 138°8′E. The severity of the wreck damage resulted in the decision to scrap the vessel on site in 1947.
