= Japanese transport Suzuya Maru =

Imperial Japanese naval vessel

History

Empire of Japan
- Name: Suzuya Maru
- Namesake: Suzuya River
- Builder: Mitsui Tamano Engineering & Shipbuilding, Tamano
- Yard number: 77
- Laid down: 30 May 1922
- Launched: 2 September 1922
- Sponsored by: Kita Nippon Kisen K.K.
- Completed: 30 September 1922
- Acquired: Requisitioned by Imperial Japanese Navy, 1925
- Home port: Otaru
- Identification: 22520
- Fate: Torpedoed and sunk off New Ireland, 13 June 1943
- Notes: Call sign: NVBJ

General characteristics
- Type: Passenger/cargo ship
- Tonnage: 864 GRT
- Length: 56.39 m (185 ft 0 in) o/a
- Beam: 9.6 m (31 ft 6 in)
- Draught: 5.94 m (19 ft 6 in)
- Installed power: 600 bhp (450 kW)
- Propulsion: 1 triple expansion engine, single shaft, 1 screw
- Speed: 11 knots (20 km/h; 13 mph)

Suzuya Maru (Japanese: 鈴谷丸) was an auxiliary transport and hell ship of the Imperial Japanese Navy during World War II.

== History ==
She was laid down on 30 May 1922 by Mitsui Tamano Engineering & Shipbuilding at their Tamano shipyard at the behest of Kita Nippon Kisen K.K./Kitanihon Kisen. She was launched on 2 September 1922, completed on 30 September 1922, and registered in Otaru as Hokkai Maru No. 1 but had her name changed in 1924 to Suzuya Maru (after the Suzuya River in Karafuto Prefecture on Sakhalin Island, then part of Japan). Her sister ship was Hokkai Maru No. 2 (renamed Hayataka Maru). In 1925, she was requisitioned by the Imperial Japanese Navy. Little is known of her service and she seemed to have lost her original name generally being referred to as No. 107 or Otaru Maru, Otari Maru, or Otaro Maru. On 15 August 1942, she took 179 prisoners of wars (POWs) at the port of Takao who had arrived aboard Nagara Maru. The POWs were all American senior civilian and military authorities of the Philippines and included Major General Jonathan M. Wainwright, Commander of Allied forces in the Philippines, and Major General Edward P. King who lead the defense of the Bataan Peninsula in the Battle of Bataan. She delivered the prisoners to the Karenko POW camp on the west coast of Formosa.

On 13 June 1943, Suzuya Maru was torpedoed and sunk by the US submarine USS Guardfish off the southwest coast of New Ireland (03°08′S 151°24′E).
