= Japanese transport ship Hayataka Maru =

History

Empire of Japan
- Name: Hayataka Maru
- Builder: Mitsui Tamano Engineering & Shipbuilding, Tamano
- Yard number: 77
- Laid down: 18 October 1922
- Launched: 9 February 1923
- Completed: 31 March 1923
- Identification: 22522
- Fate: Torpedoed and sunk, 23 December 1941
- Notes: Call sign: NYBL

General characteristics
- Type: passenger/cargo ship
- Tonnage: 865 GRT
- Length: 56.39 m (185 ft 0 in) o/a
- Beam: 9.6 m (31 ft 6 in)
- Draught: 5.94 m (19 ft 6 in)
- Installed power: 600 bhp (450 kW)
- Propulsion: 1 triple expansion engine, single shaft, 1 screw
- Speed: 11 knots (20 km/h; 13 mph)

Hayataka Maru was used as an auxiliary transport of the Imperial Japanese Navy during World War II.

== History ==
She was laid down on 18 October 1922 by Mitsui Tamano Engineering & Shipbuilding at their Tamano shipyard. She was launched on 9 February 1923, completed on 31 March 1923, and registered in Otaru as Hokkai Maru No. 2. She was renamed Hayataka Maru in 1932 when she was sold to the Teikoku Salvage Co. Although Lloyd's Register of Shipping lists her as Hayataka Maru, she was also known as Soryu Maru.

Her sister ship was Hokkai Maru No. 1 (renamed Suzuya Maru).

On 23 December 1941, Hayataka Maru was torpedoed and sunk by the US submarine USS Seal off Vigan just north of Lingayen Gulf at 17°35′N 120°12′E.
