= JS Abukuma =

Japanese Abukuma-class destroyer escort

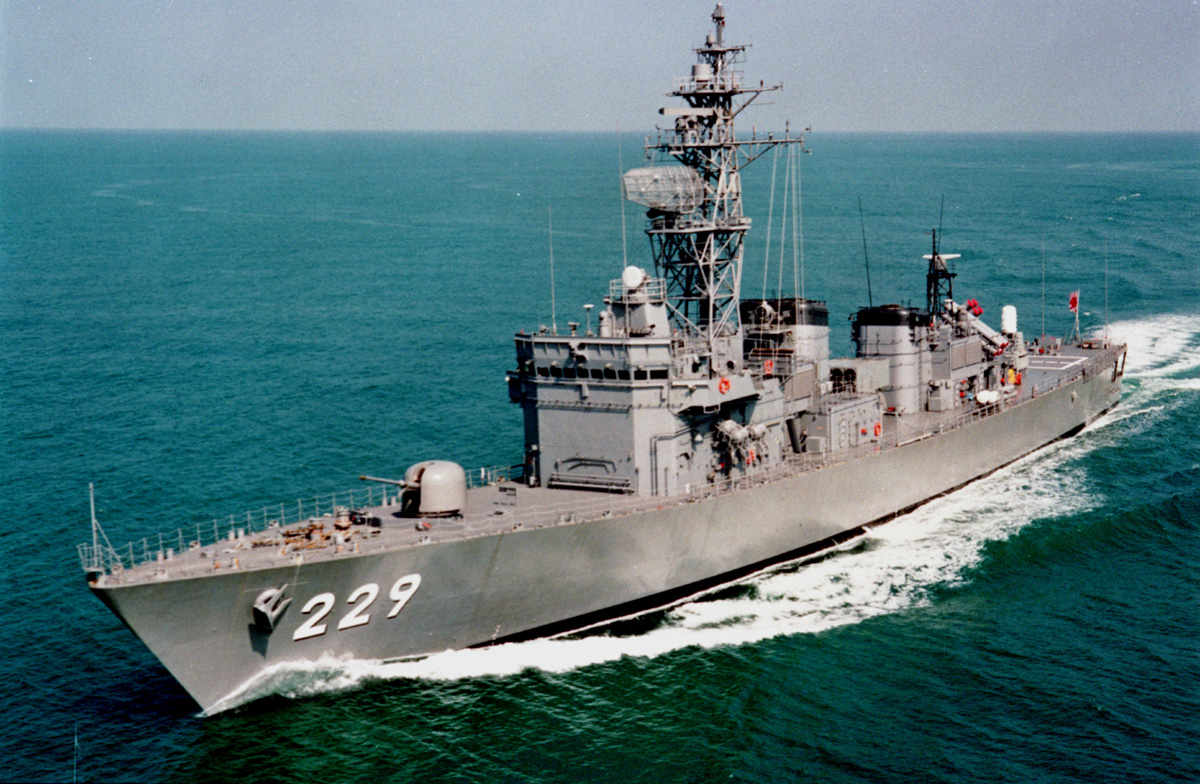
- JS Abukuma

History

Japan
- Name: Abukuma; (あぶくま)
- Namesake: Abukuma (1923)
- Ordered: 1986
- Builder: Mitsui, Tamano
- Laid down: 17 March 1988
- Launched: 21 December 1988
- Commissioned: 12 December 1989
- Home port: Kure
- Identification: MMSI number: 431999508; Pennant number: DE-229
- Status: Active

General characteristics
- Class & type: Abukuma-class destroyer escort
- Displacement: 2,000 tons standard; 2,550 tons full load
- Length: 357 ft (109 m)
- Beam: 44 ft (13 m)
- Draft: 12 ft (3.7 m)
- Propulsion: CODOG, two shafts; 2 × Kawasaki-RR SM1A gas turbines 26,650 hp (19,870 kW); 2 × Mitsubishi S12U MTK diesels 6,000 hp (4,500 kW)
- Speed: 27 knots (50 km/h; 31 mph)
- Complement: 120
- Sensors & processing systems: FCS-2
- Armament: 8 × Harpoon missiles; ASROC octuple launcher; 1 × Otobreda 76 mm gun; 1 × Phalanx 20 mm CIWS; 2 × HOS-301 triple 324 mm (12.8 in) torpedo tubes

JS Abukuma (DE-229) is the lead ship of the Abukuma-class destroyer escorts. She was commissioned on 12 December 1989.

== Construction and career ==
Abukuma was laid down at Mitsui Engineering & Shipbuilding Tamano Shipyard on 17 March 1988 and launched on 21 December 1988. She was commissioned on 12 December 1989 and deployed to Maizuru.

The Royal Australian Navy destroyer HMAS Perth and frigate HMAS Canberra, which called at Maizuru from 29 October to 3 November 1993, were hosted by the escort ship JS Chikuma and Abukuma.

A suspicious ship off was spotted off the Noto Peninsula on 23 March 1999. The first "maritime security action" was announced, and the suspicious ship was tracked by Abukuma along with the escort ships JS Haruna and JS Myōkō.

The destroyer escort joined Maizuru District Force 24th Escort Corps on 6 November 2003. On 26 March 2008, the 24th escort was renamed to the 14th escort due to a major reorganization of the Self-Defense Fleet, and was reorganized under the escort fleet.

On 6 July 2009, Japan-Korea rescue joint training was held in the Sea of Japan, and Abukuma participated with the escort ship JS Ōnami and three P-3C patrol aircraft, and the Republic of Korea Navy destroyer ROKS Yang Man-chun. Training was conducted with ROKS Wang Geon.

On 15 March 2010, the escort fleet was transferred to the 12th escort corps due to reorganization, and the homeport was transferred from Maizuru to Kure. Abukuma was among the naval forces dispatched to aid inhabitants of Japan after the 2011 Great East Japan Earthquake off the Pacific coast on 11 March 2011.
