= USS Seal (SS-183) =

Submarine of the United States

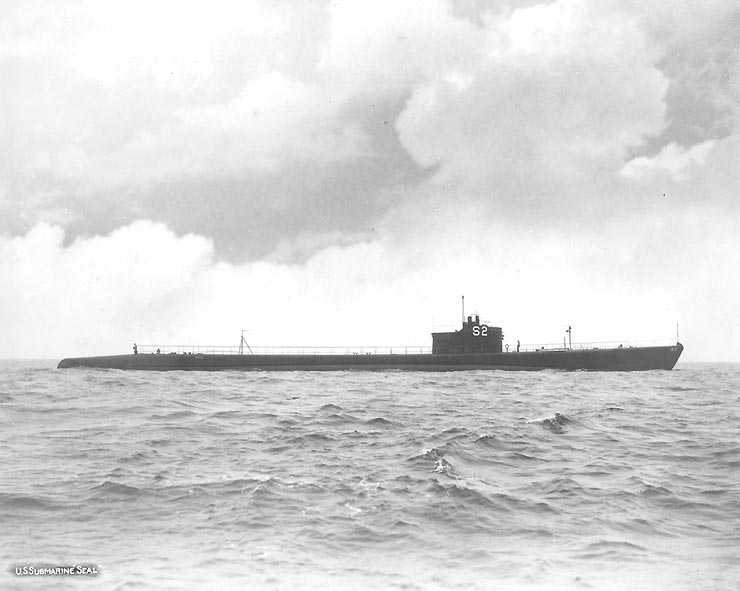
- USS Seal

History

United States
- Name: Seal
- Builder: Electric Boat Company, Groton, Connecticut
- Laid down: 25 May 1936
- Launched: 25 August 1937
- Commissioned: 30 April 1938
- Decommissioned: 15 November 1945
- Stricken: 1 May 1956
- Fate: Sold for scrap, 6 May 1957

General characteristics
- Class & type: Salmon-class composite diesel-hydraulic and diesel-electric submarine
- Displacement: 1,435 long tons (1,458 t) standard, surfaced, 2,198 long tons (2,233 t) submerged
- Length: 308 ft 0 in (93.88 m)
- Beam: 26 ft 1 1/4 in (7.957 m)
- Draft: 15 ft 8 in (4.78 m)
- Propulsion: 4 × Hooven-Owens-Rentschler (H.O.R.) 9-cylinder diesel engines (two hydraulic-drive, two driving electrical generators), 2 × 120-cell batteries, 4 × high-speed Elliott electric motors with reduction gears, two shafts, 5,500 shp (4.1 MW) surfaced, 2,660 shp (2.0 MW) submerged
- Speed: 21 knots (39 km/h) surfaced, 9 knots (17 km/h) submerged
- Range: 11,000 nautical miles (20,000 km) @ 10 knots (19 km/h)
- Endurance: 48 hours @ 2 knots (3.7 km/h) submerged
- Test depth: 250 ft (76 m)
- Complement: 5 officers, 54 enlisted
- Armament: 8 × 21 inch (533 mm) torpedo tubes (four forward, four aft; 24 torpedoes), 1 × 3 in (76 mm)/50 cal deck gun, four machine guns

USS Seal (SS-183), a Salmon-class submarine, was the second ship of the United States Navy to be named for the seal, a sea mammal valued for its skin and oil.

== Construction and commissioning ==
Seal′s keel was laid down on 25 May 1936 by the Electric Boat Company in Groton, Connecticut. She was launched on 25 April 1937 at Naval Submarine Base New London in Groton, sponsored by Mrs. Rosemary G. Greenslade, wife of Lieutenant (later Rear Admiral) John F. Greenslade and daughter-in-law of Rear Admiral John W. Greenslade. Seal was commissioned on 30 April 1937, Lieutenant Karl Goldsmith Hensel, commanding.

== Service history ==
=== Inter-war period ===
Following an extended shakedown cruise in the Caribbean and a post-shakedown yard period, Seal departed New England in late November and proceeded to the Panama Canal Zone to commence operations out of her home port, Coco Solo. Arriving on 3 December, she conducted local operations off Balboa, Panama, and off Coco Solo into January 1939, then proceeded to Haiti where she participated in type exercises prior to Fleet Problem XX. That exercise, to test the fleet's ability to control the approaches to Central America and South America, was conducted during late February in the Lesser Antilles.

In March, Seal returned to the Haiti–Cuba area for exercises with Destroyer Division 4 (DesDiv 4). In April, she proceeded to New London, Connecticut, for overhaul which included modification of her main engines. In June, the submarine again sailed south, transited the Panama Canal, and continued on to San Diego, California, and Pearl Harbor. In Hawaii from July to September, she took soundings for the Hydrographic Office and participated in various local exercises. At the end of the latter month, she returned to San Diego, her home port into 1941.

During the next two years, she conducted exercises and provided services to surface ships and to United States Navy and United States Army air units along the West Coast and in the Hawaiian area. In the fall of 1941, Submarine Division 21 (SubDiv 21) - of which she was now a part - was transferred to the Asiatic Fleet. Departing Pearl Harbor on 24 October, she reached Manila on 10 November, and 34 days later, cleared that bay to commence her first war patrol. She headed north to intercept Japanese forces moving into northern Luzon to reinforce those already landed at Vigan and Aparri, Cagayan.

=== World War II ===
Initially off Cape Bojeador, she shifted south to the Vigan area on 20 December, and on 23 December, torpedoed and sank Hayataka Maru, the last Japanese ship sunk by American torpedoes in December 1941 killing them all.

==== 1942 ====
From the Vigan area, the submarine moved into the approaches to Lingayen Gulf, and in January 1942, she again turned north to patrol the entrance to Lamon Bay. She rounded Cape Bojeador on 9 January and Cape Engaño on 10 January, and, on 11 January—as the Japanese invaded the Netherlands East Indies at Tarakan, Borneo, and Minahasa, Celebes—she headed south for the Molucca Passage. By 20 January, she was patrolling east of the Celebes to intercept enemy traffic into Kema. On 27 January, she was ordered to patrol off Kendari, which had been attacked on 24 January and then to proceed to the Royal Netherlands Naval Base at Soerabaja, then still under Allied control.

Seal arrived at Soerabaja on 5 February. Daily air raids necessitated diving during the day and precluded repairs to her engines, which smoked excessively, and to the broken prism control mechanism in her high periscope. On 11 February, she departed for Tjilatjap on the south coast of Java, and on 14 February, she went alongside Holland. That same day, the Japanese moved into southern Sumatra, and on 19 February, they invaded Bali. Allied forces counterattacked, and as air and surface forces hit the Japanese fleet, Seal departed Tjilatjap and transited Lombok Strait to patrol north of Java. On 24 February, she attacked two convoys, only damaging one freighter. The next day, she unsuccessfully attacked an enemy warship formation. On 1 March, as the Japanese moved against Soerabaja, she was similarly disappointed. On 14 March, she headed east to patrol the southern approaches to Makassar City, and for the next week, with her forward air conditioning unit broken down and her refrigerating plant inoperable, she patrolled between that city and De Bril Bank. On 21 March, she headed for Fremantle, Western Australia—the Netherlands East Indies had fallen.

Arriving on 9 April, Seal departed again on 12 May and worked her way through the Malay Archipelago, the Celebes Sea, and the Sulu Sea to her patrol area off the Indochina coast. During the early morning hours of 28 May, she entered the South China Sea, and that night, she fired on and sank 1,946-ton Tatsufuku Maru. On 7 June, while off Cam Ranh Bay, she attacked an eight-ship convoy and underwent a seven-hour depth charging by surface ships and aircraft. From 15 to 17 June, heavy seas and high winds hampered hunting, and on 18 June, "a healthy stream of air bubbles" was discovered "issuing from the starboard side...." On 19 June, she left the area and headed for Balabac Strait. On 23 June, she moved into Makassar Strait, and on 4 July, she reached Fremantle.

On her fourth war patrol, from 10 August-2 October, Seal returned to the Indochina coast and patrolled north from Cape Padaran. Despite 11 sightings, she was plagued by uncertain torpedo performance against shallow draft vessels, by premature explosions and by leaky exhaust valves and holes in the fuel compensating line which resulted in air and oil leaks to the surface. She was able to damage only one cargo ship, on 3 September.

Twelve days later, Seal was en route back to Fremantle. She arrived on 2 October and departed again on 24 October to patrol in the shipping lanes in the Palau area. On 16 November, she intercepted a convoy of five cargomen in two columns with a destroyer escort and conducted a submerged attack on the leader of the near column as the formation zigzagged toward the submarine. Less than a minute after firing, Seal collided with, or was rammed by, another enemy ship. The periscope went black and vibrated severely. The submarine rose to 55 feet (17 m); hung there nearly a minute then started down. A few minutes later, depth charging began and Seal leveled off at 250 feet (76 m). Breaking up noises were heard. Four hours later, the area was clear and Seal surfaced. The high periscope had been bent horizontally, and the housing on the low periscope had been sprung, preventing its operation. The radar antenna had been broken off the radio mast. Quantities of uncooked rice and beans, unlike those used on the submarine, were found between the wooden deck pieces of the cigarette deck, on the bridge, and caught in the bathythermograph. The periscope shears yielded "a good sample of Japanese bottom paint."

Captured Japanese documents later confirmed the sinking of 3,500-ton Boston Maru by an American submarine on that date in that location. Whether that ship was Seal's target or the colliding ship is not known, but it is possible that the freighter's hull had been badly punctured by the submarine's periscope shears.

On 17 November, Seal was ordered to start for Pearl Harbor. She arrived on 30 November, and after temporary repairs, continued on to the Mare Island Navy Yard for permanent repairs.

==== 1943 ====
On 2 April 1943, she returned to Hawaii, and 12 days later, she departed on her sixth war patrol. On 18 April, she topped off at Midway Island, and by 1 May, she was patrolling off the Palau Islands. On 2 May, she attacked a freighter, but missed and subsequently came under an aerial bombing attack. On 4 May, she sank San Clemente Maru, but for the remainder of the patrol, was unable to close any targets.

Seal returned to Midway on 3 June. Refit took two weeks; further training took a third. On 24 June, she was ready for sea. On 2 July, she entered her area off Todo Saki on the northeastern Honshū coast, and on 8 July, she underwent a severe, ten-hour, depth charging which resulted in persistent air and oil leaks and forced her to turn back for repairs.

She arrived at Pearl Harbor on 24 July. Her repairs were quickly completed, and in mid-August, she sailed west again. On 27 July, she entered the southern Kuril Islands. On 31 July, while the submarine was diving, the conning tower hatch failed to latch, and subsequently flew open. The pumproom was flooded before the boat could be surfaced. Substantial damage to her electrical circuits resulted and Seal retired eastward to make temporary repairs. The work continued for a week, and on 8 August, as the air compressors were being jury-rigged to provide sufficient air pressure to launch torpedoes, she returned to the Kurils and crossed into the Sea of Okhotsk. On 17 August, she attacked two freighters with no success. On 25 August, she cleared the area, and on 4 October, she returned to Pearl Harbor.

During her next war patrols, Seal provided lifeguard services and conducted reconnaissance missions—at Kwajalein on her ninth - from 7 November-19 December - and at Ponape on her tenth - from 17 January-6 March 1944.

==== 1944 ====
Seal proceeded to Mare Island, and after re-engining and overhaul, returned to the northern Hokkaidō–Kuril Islands area for her eleventh war patrol, from 8 August-17 September.

With 14–15 hours of daylight, she hunted in the coastal and inter-island shipping lanes to Muroran, Matsuwa, and Paramushiro. On 24 August, she attacked and sank Tosei Maru off Erimo Saki. On 5 September, after a six-hour chase, she fired four torpedoes at a maru with one escort. All of her torpedoes missed. On the night of 8 September, she encountered a two-column, six-ship convoy with an escort on each wing, and closed in to the leading ship. Shortly after 2045, she fired four torpedoes at overlapping targets, then opened to the eastward as the torpedoes started hitting. Just before midnight, she again attacked the convoy, now comprising only four ships. One freighter took two hits. A second maru turned to chase Seal. Seal retired briefly, and just before 0300 on 9 September, hit the remainder of the convoy. Daylight brought antisubmarine aircraft to the scene, and Seal fishtailed at deep submergence until 1700. At 2026, having sunk Shonan Maru and damaged three or four other ships, she headed for Midway, arriving on 17 September.

On her twelfth and final war patrol, from 10 October-29 November, Seal again hunted in the Kurils. Her 30 days in the area yielded only two contacts worthy of torpedo fire. On 25 October, she caught and sank Hakuyo Maru (5,742 GRT) killing 1,415 as it ran down the convoy lanes away from Paramushiro. Three weeks later, she attacked and damaged another maru off Etorofu (now Iturup). During the last days of the patrol, she ranged off the coast of Sakhalin, scoreless. On 17 October, she cleared the area.

Seal arrived at Pearl Harbor on 29 November, and after refit, assumed training duties in the Hawaiian area. In June 1945, she returned to New London where she continued her training duties through the end of World War II.

=== Post-War ===
After the war, she was ordered inactivated and disposed of. In early November, she proceeded to Boston, Massachusetts, where she was decommissioned on 15 November, and after a change in her orders, was retained in the Reserve Fleet. On 19 June 1947, she was placed in service and assigned to Boston as a Naval Reserve training ship, and in March 1949, she was transferred to Portsmouth, New Hampshire, where she continued to serve the Naval Reserve until placed out of service and struck from the Naval Vessel Register on 1 May 1956. Six days later, she was removed from the Portsmouth Naval Shipyard for scrapping.

== Awards ==
- Asiatic-Pacific Campaign Medal with 10 battle stars for World War II service
