= Ōminato Guard District =

Japanese naval base

- 大湊警備府
- Mutsu, Aomori in Japan
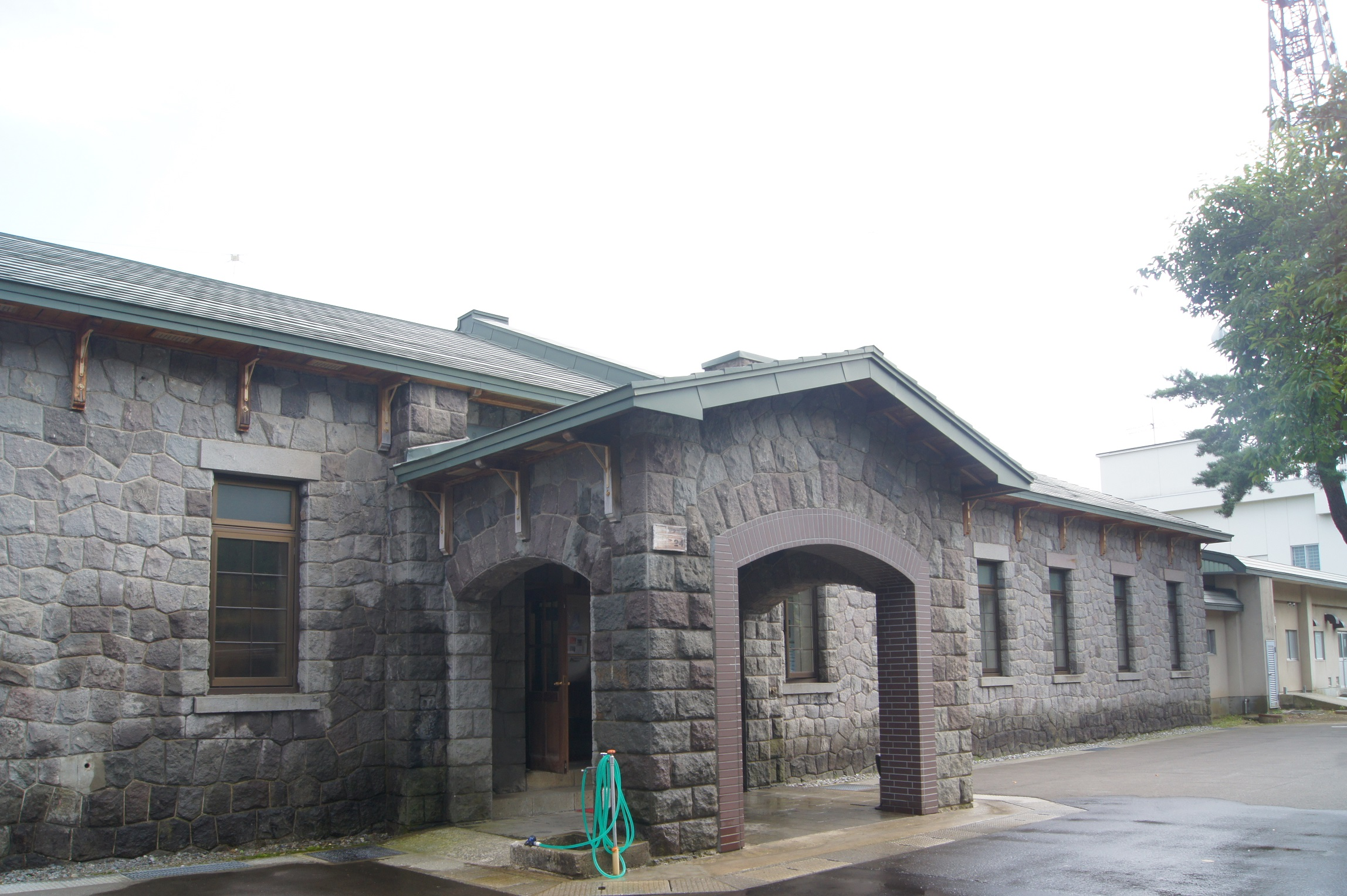
- Surviving pre-war building of the former Ōminato Guard District

Site information
- Owner: Imperial Japanese Navy

Location
- Location within Japan Location within Aomori Prefecture
- Coordinates: 41°13′58″N 141°07′56″E

Site history
- Built: 12 June 1895
- In use: 16 September 1953

The Ōminato Guard District (大湊警備府, Ōminato Keibifu) was the major navy base for the Imperial Japanese Navy in northern Honshu before and during World War II. Located in Mutsu Bay at the present-day city of Mutsu, Aomori Prefecture, the Ōminato Guard District was responsible for control of the strategic Tsugaru Strait between Honshu and Hokkaidō and for patrols along the Hokkaidō, Karafuto and Kurile Islands coastlines.

== History ==
In the organizational structure of the Imperial Japanese Navy in 1886, the Japanese Empire was divided into five operational districts, with the Hokkaidō-Ōshu area forming Naval District 5, with its nominal headquarters in Muroran, Hokkaidō. However, the area was given a low priority in funding, and remained largely a paper organization under overall command of the Yokosuka Naval District.

On 12 June 1895, the nominal headquarters of Naval District 5 was transferred from Muroran to the more sheltered port of Ōminato with Mutsu Bay, although facilities and infrastructure were minimal.

After the Russo-Japanese War, when the strategic importance of control of the Tsugaru Straits came into focus, and with Japan's acquisition of Karafuto Prefecture, more investment was made in securing Japan's northern frontiers. Ōminato was one of eleven designated third echelon naval ports, or yokobu (要港部 (naval station office)) located in various locations around Japan. In December 1905 it was made independent of Yokosuka. Although Muroran, Asahikawa and Wakkanai bases reported to Ōminato, it was not raised to full Naval District (鎮守府) headquarters status, but continued as Ōminato yokobu. A wireless station was completed in 1913.

On 9 October 1913, the Inazuma-class destroyer Inazuma suffered from an explosion of her No. 3 boiler while at Ōminato. The incident highlighted the need for better facilities at Ōminato, and a ship repair facility and naval hospital were completed by 1923.

On 19 July 1931, the ship repair facilities at Ōminato caught fire and were largely destroyed, and had to be rebuilt a year later. The Ōminato Naval Air Station was opened in November 1933. In September 1936, after the IJN 4th Fleet Incident (in which the fleet was caught in a typhoon, with loss of several ships and damage to many more), Ōminato received the destroyers Hatsuyuki and Yugiri for emergency repairs.

On 20 November 1941, Ōminato was finally raised to the status of a Guard District (警備府, Keibifu) In concept, the Guard District was similar to the United States Navy Sea Frontiers concept. Each Guard District maintained a small garrison force of ships and Naval Land Forces which reported directly to the Guard District commander, and hosted detachments of the numbered fleets on a temporary assignment basis.

After the start of the Pacific War, Ōminato became the home port of the IJN 5th Fleet. The attack on Dutch Harbor in the Aleutian Islands that occurred simultaneously with the Battle of Midway was launched from Ōminato.

Ōminato was bombed several times in the closing days of the war: 14 July, 15 and 28 July, followed by a large attack from August 8–10, 1945, which destroyed several ships. American forces landed from the USS Panamint (AGC-13) to accept the surrender of the base from the Imperial Japanese Navy on 9 September 1945.

The base facilities were used by the United States Navy during the occupation of Japan until 16 September 1953. A portion of the former base is now in use by the Japan Maritime Self Defense Force as JMSDF Ōminato Base.

== Order of Battle at time of the attack on Pearl Harbor ==
- Ōminato Guard District
  - Escort ship Ishigaki
  - Escort ship Kunashiri
  - Destroyer Division 1
    - Kamikaze
    - Numakaze
    - Nokaze
    - Namikaze
  - Minesweeper Division 27
    - Auxiliary minesweeper No. 1 Tamazono Maru
    - Auxiliary minesweeper No. 2 Tamazono Maru
    - Auxiliary minesweeper Sonobe Maru
    - Auxiliary minesweeper Yoshino Maru
    - Auxiliary minesweeper Chōyō Maru
    - Auxiliary minesweeper No. 2 Chōyō Maru
  - Ōminato Air Group
    - 8 × Mitsubishi A5M Claude
    - 8 × Mitsubishi B5M Mabel
    - 8 × Kawanishi E7K Alf
- Ōminato Local Defense Squadron
  - Destroyer Okikaze
  - Escort ship Hachijō
  - Auxiliary gunboat Chitose Maru
  - Auxiliary minelaying gunboat No.2 Shinkō Maru
  - Auxiliary submarine chaser Zuikō Maru
  - Icebreaker Ōtomari

== List of commanders ==
=== Commanding Officer ===
- Vice-Admiral Baron Heiji Mochihara (12 December 1905 – 12 March 1907)
- Rear-Admiral Hokizo Okubo (12 March 1907 – 15 May 1908)
- Vice-Admiral Kunikane Taketomi (15 May 1908 – 28 August 1908)
- Vice-Admiral Chikakata Tamari (28 August 1908 – 1 December 1909)
- Vice-Admiral Tokuya Kamiizumi (1 December 1909 – 1 September 1911)
- Vice-Admiral Hideshiro Fujimoto (1 September 1911 – 9 July 1912)
- Vice-Admiral Tamotsu Tsuchiya (9 July 1912 – 24 May 1913)
- Admiral Sojiro Tochinai (24 May 1913 – 1 December 1913)
- Rear-Admiral Tsunekichi Uemura (1 December 1913 – 17 December 1914)
- Rear-Admiral Ichitaro Nakajima (17 December 1914 – 1 April 1916)
- Vice-Admiral Baron Mitsukane Tsuchiya (1 April 1916 – 1 December 1917)
- Vice-Admiral Toshitake Iwamura (1 December 1917 – 1 December 1919)
- Vice-Admiral Keizaburo Moriyama (1 December 1919 – 1 October 1920)
- Vice-Admiral Mitsuzo Nunome (1 October 1920 – 1 December 1921)
- Vice-Admiral Kōzō Satō (1 December 1921 – 1 December 1922)
- Vice-Admiral Koshiro Otani (1 December 1922 – 1 June 1923)
- Rear-Admiral Shokichi Oishi (1 June 1923 – 5 February 1924)
- Vice-Admiral Kosuke Shikama (5 February 1924 – 1 December 1925)
- Vice-Admiral Takashi Kanesaka (1 December 1925 – 1 December 1927)
- Vice-Admiral Yukichi Shima (1 December 1927 – 30 November 1929)
- Vice-Admiral Saburo Yasumi (30 November 1929 – 1 March 1931)
- Vice-Admiral Kiyohiro Ijichi (1 March 1931 – 1 December 1931)
- Vice-Admiral Togo Kawano (1 December 1931 – 15 November 1932)
- Vice-Admiral Hiroshi Ono (15 November 1932 – 15 November 1933)
- Vice-Admiral Choji Inoue (15 November 1933 – 15 November 1934)
- Rear-Admiral Chonan Yamaguchi (15 November 1934 – 7 October 1935)
- Rear-Admiral Katsuji Masaki (7 October 1935 – 16 March 1936)
- Vice-Admiral Teijiro Sugisaka (16 March 1936 – 1 December 1936)
- Rear-Admiral Haruma Izawa (1 December 1936 – 1 December 1937)
- Vice-Admiral Shosuke Shimomura (1 December 1937 – 15 November 1938)
- Vice-Admiral Shuichi Hoshino (15 November 1938 – 15 November 1940)
- Vice-Admiral Masakichi Okuma (15 November 1940 – 15 September 1942)
- Vice-Admiral Shiro Kawase (15 September 1942 – 1 April 1943)
- Vice-Admiral Yasuo Inoue (1 April 1943 – 15 February 1945)
- Vice-Admiral Eiji Goto (15 February 1945 – 15 March 1945)
- Vice-Admiral Kanji Ugaki (15 March 1945 – 30 November 1945)

=== Chief of Staff ===
- Rear-Admiral Kiyozo Oda (12 December 1905 – 22 November 1906)
- Vice-Admiral Junkichi Yajima (22 November 1906 – 20 February 1908)
- Vice-Admiral Tadamichi Kamaya (20 February 1908 – 7 April 1908)
- Rear-Admiral Shigetada Hideshima (7 April 1908 – 4 March 1909)
- Rear-Admiral Tsunematsu Kondo (4 March 1909 – 1 December 1910)
- Vice-Admiral Yasujiro Nagata (1 December 1910 – 22 December 1911)
- Rear-Admiral Teiichiro Shitsuda (1 April 1913 – 27 May 1914)
- Rear-Admiral Yushichi Kanno (27 May 1914 – 17 July 1915)
- Vice-Admiral Kenzo Kobayashi (17 July 1915 – 6 November 1916)
- Rear-Admiral Meiji Tojo (6 November 1916 – 18 October 1918)
- Rear-Admiral Kanichi Taketomi (18 October 1918 – 2 December 1919)
- Rear-Admiral Teiji Sakamoto (15 March 1922 – 6 November 1923)
- Rear-Admiral Kichisuke Komori (6 November 123 – 20 August 1926)
- Rear-Admiral Katsuji Masaki (10 December 1928 – 1 December 1931)
- Rear-Admiral Tokujiro Yokoyama (1 December 1931 – 15 November 1933)
- Rear-Admiral Takeo Sakura (15 November 1933 – 15 November 1935)
- Vice-Admiral Jiro Matsunaga (15 November 1935 – 1 April 1937)
- Rear-Admiral Namizo Sato (1 April 1937 – 15 December 1938)
- Rear-Admiral Tokuji Mori (15 December 1938 – 28 November 1940)
- Rear-Admiral Keishi Ishii (28 November 1940 – 10 February 1942)
- Vice-Admiral Takeo Kaizuka (10 February 1940 – 1 July 1943)
- Rear-Admiral Zensuke Kanome (1 July 1943 – 30 November 1945)
