= FCS-2 =

Shipboard gun and missile system

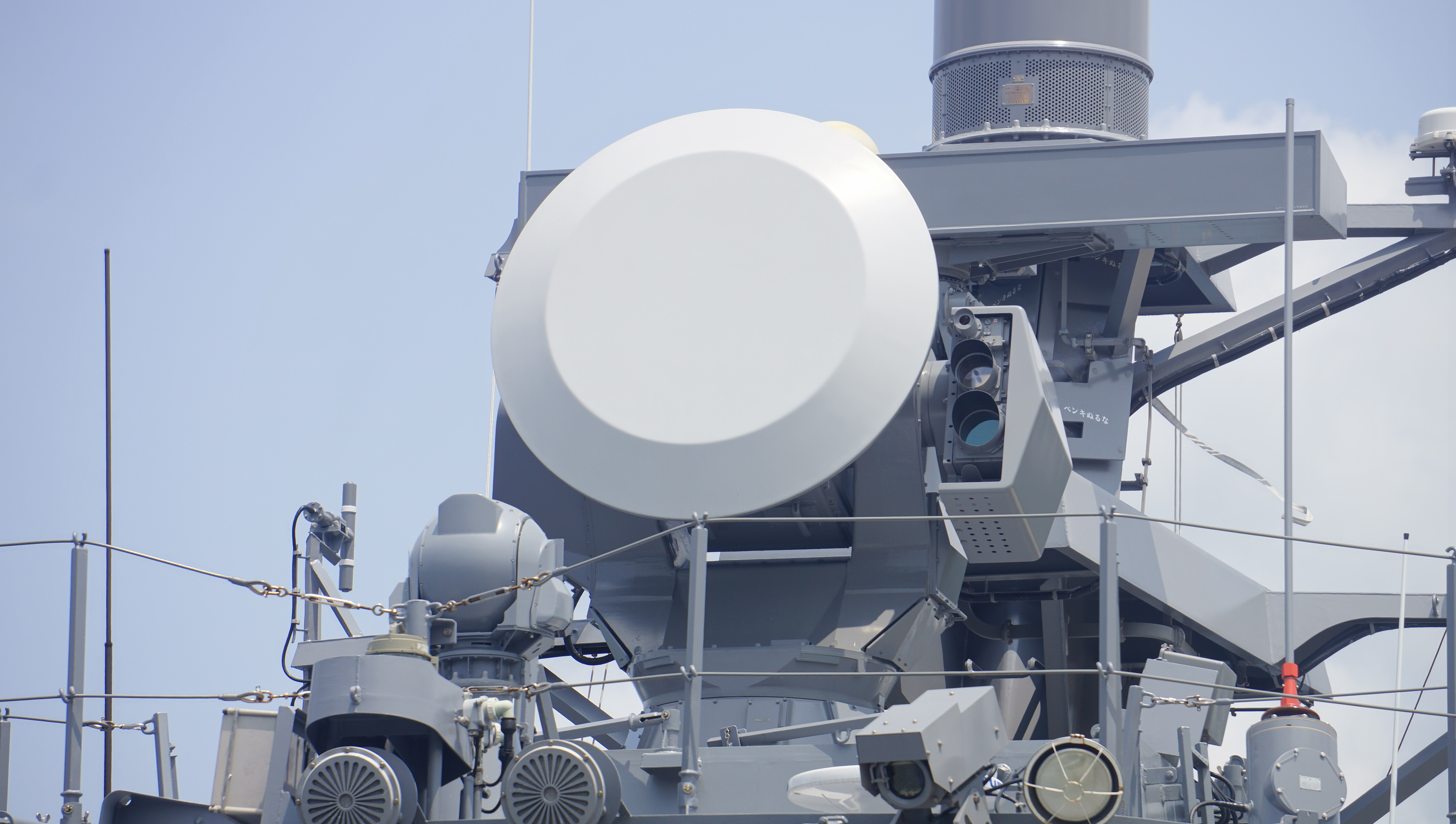
- FCS-2-31 on JDS Hayabusa
- Country of origin: Japan
- Introduced: 1979
- Type: Tracking
- Frequency: X band

Type 81 Fire Control System (FCS-2) is a Japanese shipboard gun and missile fire-control system. This series of systems has been installed on destroyers of the Japan Maritime Self-Defense Force built between FY1977 and FY2001 to control medium-caliber guns and Sea Sparrow missiles, including ESSM.

== Background ==
In the 1960s, the Technical Research and Development Institute (技術研究本部, Gijutsu-kenkyū-honbu) had been developing FCS-1, a traditional manned ship gun fire-control system. Then, in response to the sinking of Eilat in 1967, the Japan Maritime Self-Defense Force began to focus on improving anti-ship missile defense (ASMD) capabilities. Since FY1970, the TRDI began to develop the Compact fire-control system (小型射撃指揮装置, Kogata-shageki-shiki-souchi), a new ASMD-capable FCS.

In FY1975, a prototype was installed in JDS Murakumo with an OTO Melara 76 mm compact gun, and a marine test was started. In the initial plan, it was to be introduced into service with the Shirane-class destroyer built under the FY1975 program, but it was abandoned due to development delay and dutch WM-25 was installed for this class. In order to solve this plan delay, special work groups were formed in 1978 with uniformed officials and civilian engineers. As they conducted vigorous research and fierce shooting experiments of hundreds of shots a day, shooting accuracy improved dramatically and all problems were solved.

== Design ==
In the prototype, there were two antennas for track while scan operation: slotted waveguide antenna for searching and cassegrain antenna for tracking. Both antennas were covered with a radome. Also outside of the radome, an electro-optical tracker was installed. As a fire-control computer, digital electronic computer was installed instead of an electromechanical analog computer of the FCS-1.

Mass production versions were put into service with destroyers and destroyer escorts built under the FY1977 program. On the Hatsuyuki-class destroyer, a combination of one FCS-2-12 and one FCS-2-21 was adopted at the beginning. FCS-2-12 is very similar to the prototype, but adds a missile guidance function. FCS-2-21A is a simplified version specialized in gun fire-control, adding an electro-optical tracker on the left side of tracking radar antenna and omitting the search radar antenna. And a FCS-2-21B was installed on the destroyer escort Ishikari, which introduced a Passive electronically scanned array antenna instead of a cassegrain antenna and was capable of searching. Then many minor change models were developed.

In the second-generation DDs, two FCS-2-31 are installed, not a combination of two heterogeneous models. In this model, a dish similar to 2-21A controls both a medium-caliber gun and Sea Sparrow missiles.

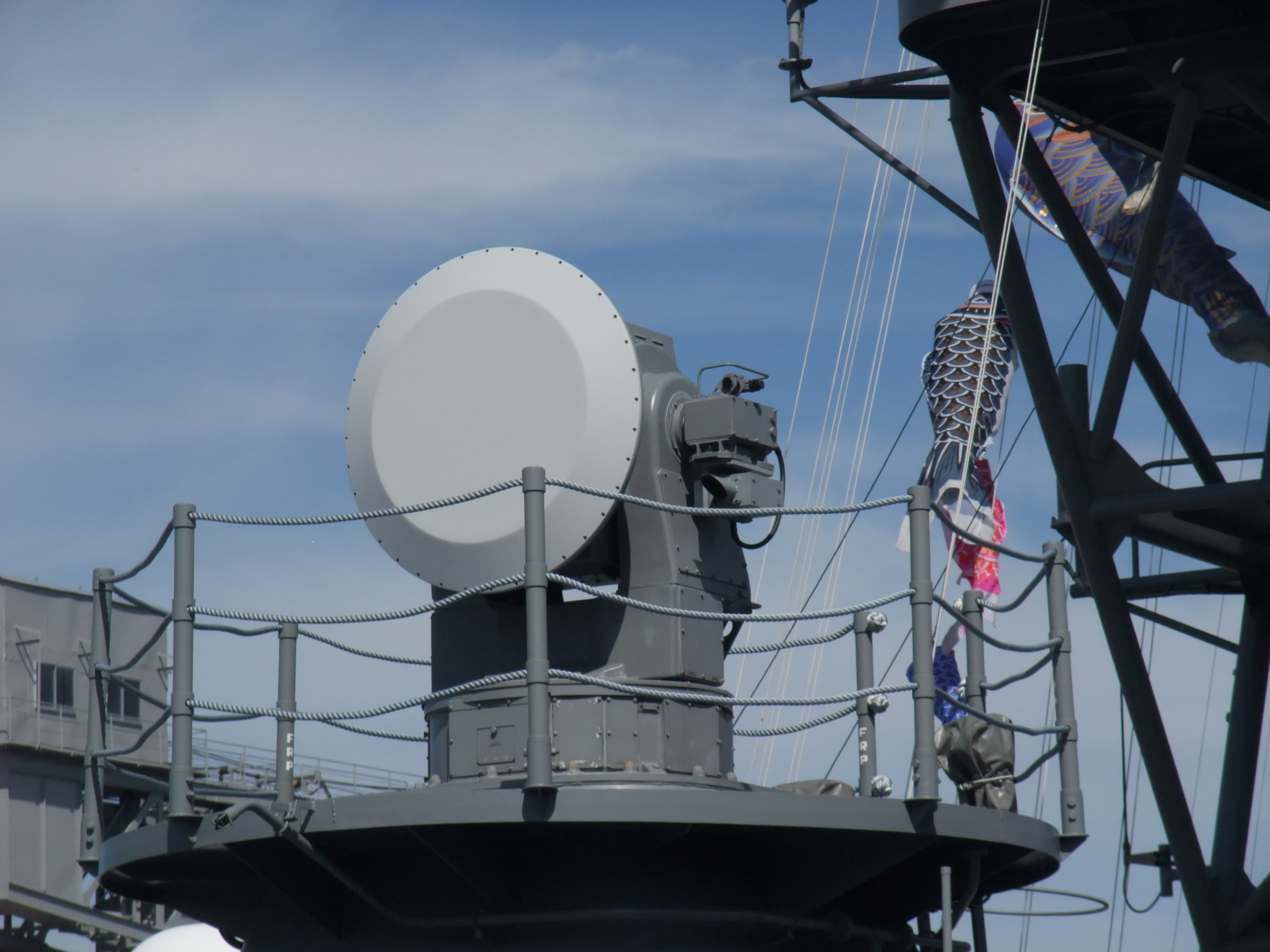
FCS-2-21A on board JDS Yamayuki

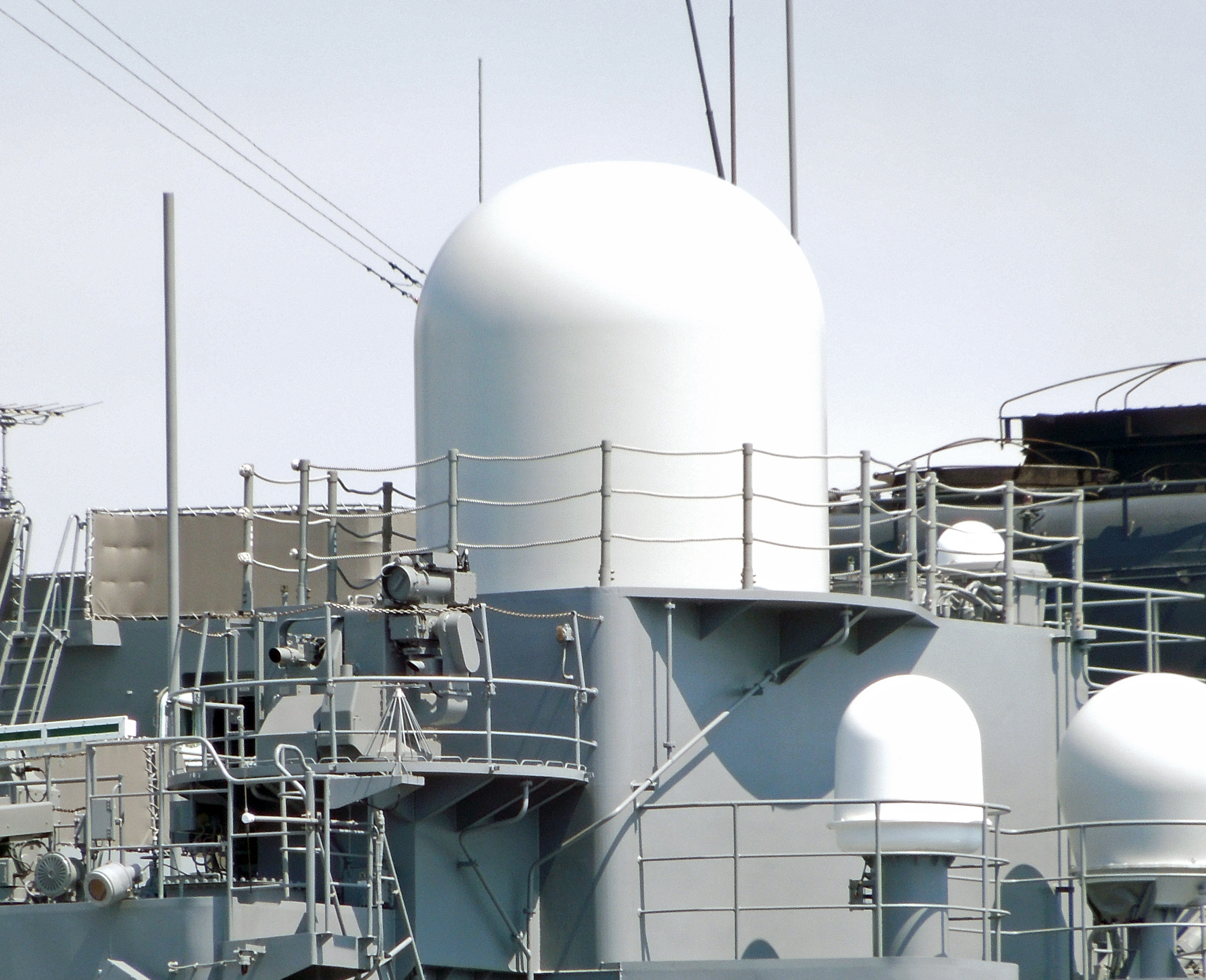
FCS-2-12: radome and electro-optical tracker

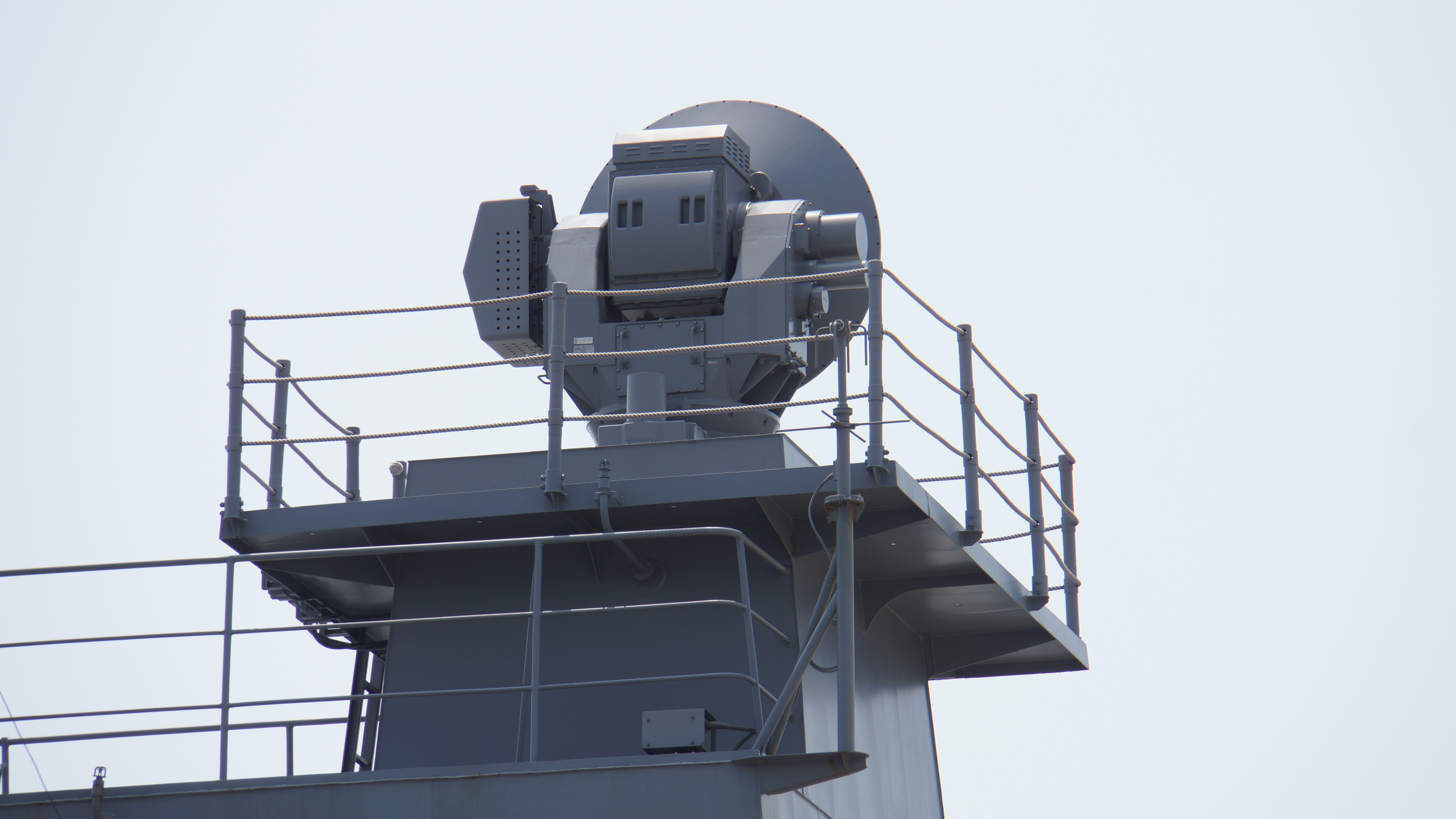
Rear view of a FCS-2-31 on board JDS Kirisame

== Operators ==
Japan Maritime Self-Defense Force

- Helicopter destroyers (DDH; both class were retrofitted at later dates)
  - Haruna-class
  - Shirane-class
- Guided missile destroyers (DDG)
  - JDS Amatsukaze (retrofitted at a later date)
  - JDS Sawakaze
  - Hatakaze-class
  - Kongō-class
- General-purpose destroyers (DD/DDA)
  - Takatsuki-class (retrofitted at later dates)
  - Hatsuyuki-class
  - Asagiri-class
  - Murasame-class
  - Takanami-class
- Destroyer escorts (DE)
  - JDS Ishikari
  - Yūbari-class
  - Abukuma-class
- Minor surface combatants and auxiliary ships
  - Hayabusa-class patrol boat
  - JDS Kashima
  - JDS Bungo
  - JDS Kurobe
  - JDS Tenryu
