= Japanese ship Yūbari =

Two warships of Japan have been named Yūbari:

- Japanese cruiser Yūbari, a cruiser launched in 1923 and sunk in 1944
- JS Yūbari, a Yūbari-class destroyer escort launched in 1982 and stricken in 2010
