= JS Yūbetsu =

Two ships of the Japan Maritime Self-Defense Force have been named Yūbetsu:

- JS Yūbetsu (DE-228), a Yūbari-class destroyer escort
- JS Yūbetsu (FFM-8), a Mogami-class frigate
