= JS Yūbetsu (FFM-8) =

Mogami-class frigate

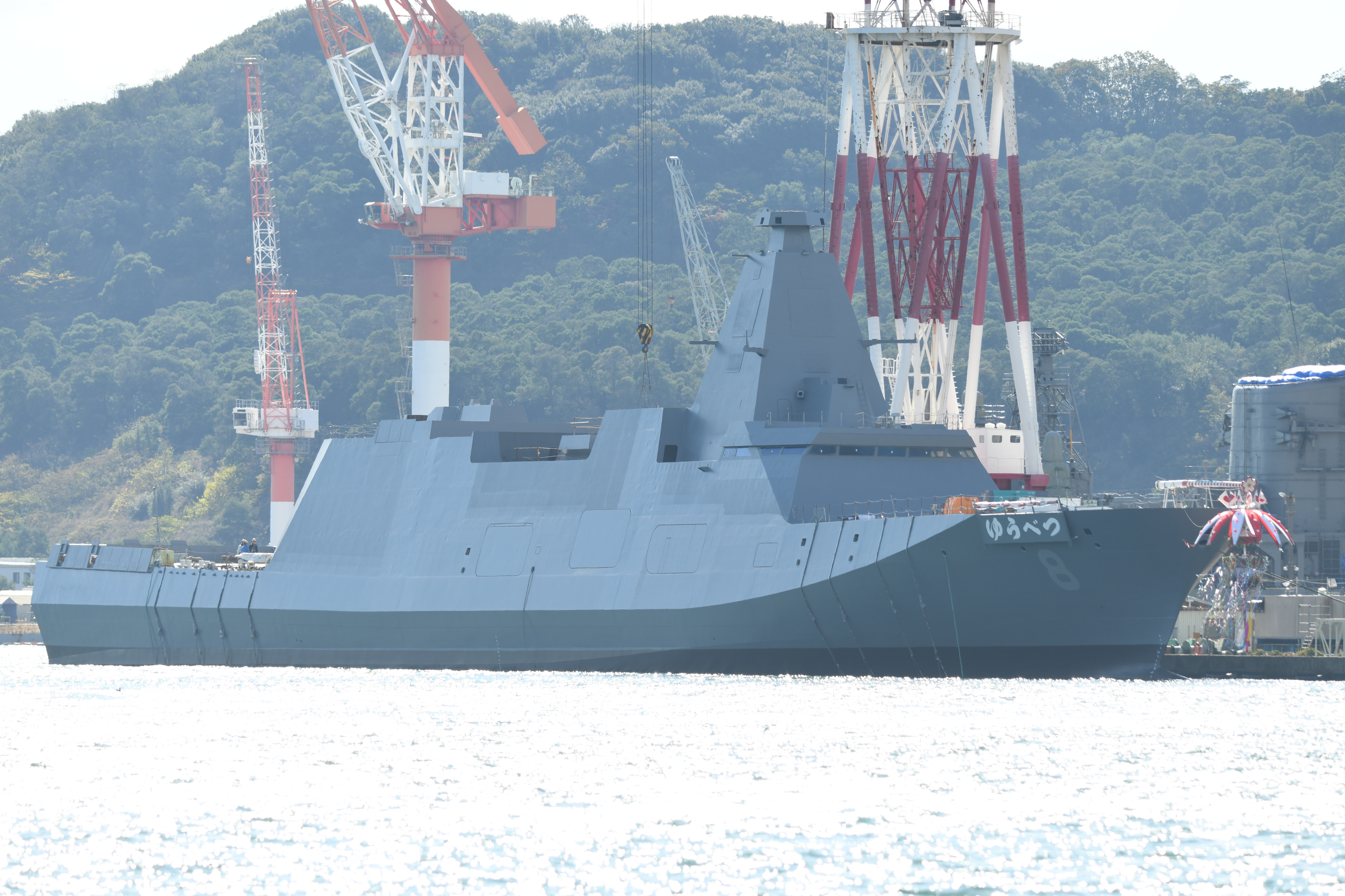
- Yūbetsu after the launch ceremony

History

Japan
- Name: Yūbetsu
- Namesake: Yūbetsu River
- Builder: Mitsubishi Heavy Industries, Tamano
- Cost: Approximately 46 to 47 billion yen
- Laid down: 30 August 2022
- Launched: 14 November 2023
- Commissioned: 19 June 2025
- Identification: Pennant number: FFM-8
- Status: Active

General characteristics
- Class & type: Mogami-class frigate
- Displacement: 3,900 t (3,800 long tons; 4,300 short tons) (standard); 5,500 t (5,400 long tons; 6,100 short tons) (full load)
- Length: 132.5 m (434 ft 9 in)
- Beam: 16.3 m (53 ft 6 in)
- Draft: 9 m (29 ft 6 in)
- Propulsion: CODAG; 1 × Rolls-Royce MT30 gas turbine; 2 × MAN Diesel V28/33DD STC engine
- Speed: in excess of 30 knots (56 km/h; 35 mph)
- Boats & landing craft carried: 2 × RHIB, UUV, USV
- Crew: around 90
- Sensors & processing systems: OPY-2 (X-band multi-purpose AESA radar); OAX-3(EO/IR); OQQ-25 (VDS + TASS); OQQ-11 (Mine-hunting sonar); OYQ-1 (Combat management system); OYX-1-29 (Console display system)
- Electronic warfare & decoys: NOLQ-3E (Passive radar system + Electronic attack capability is integrated into the main radar antenna), Chaff dispenser
- Armament: 1 × 5 in (127 mm) Mk-45 Mod 4 naval gun; 2 × missile canisters for a total of 8 Type 17 anti-ship missiles; 1 × SeaRAM; Type 12 torpedoes; Simplified mine laying equipment; 2 × Mk-41 VLS (16 cells total) (Note: To be equipped later.); Naval version of Type 03 Chū-SAM; 2 × Remote weapon station

Yūbetsu (ゆうべつ) is a frigate of the Japan Maritime Self-Defense Force (JMSDF), and the eighth ship of the Mogami class. She was named after the Yūbetsu River in Hokkaido and is the second ship to bear the name, after the Yūbari-class destroyer escort Yūbetsu.

== History ==
Yūbetsu was ordered from Mitsubishi Heavy Industries as part of the JMSDF's Mid-Term Defense Program of 2021, and she was laid down at Mitsubishi Heavy Industries Maritime Systems in Tamano on 30 August 2022. She was christened and launched on 14 November 2023. Although the acquisition cost of the Mk.41 VLS was included in the 2021 supplementary budget, it was decided to equip it at a later date, due to the global semiconductor shortage. The ship was originally planned to be commissioned in March 2025 after a period of being fitted out and undergoing sea trials. Due to the COVID-19 pandemic and the delayed delivery of semiconductors, Yūbetsu was instead commissioned on 19 June 2025, being deployed to the Ōminato Naval Base.
