= JS Yūbetsu (DE-228) =

Japanese Yūbari-class destroyer escort

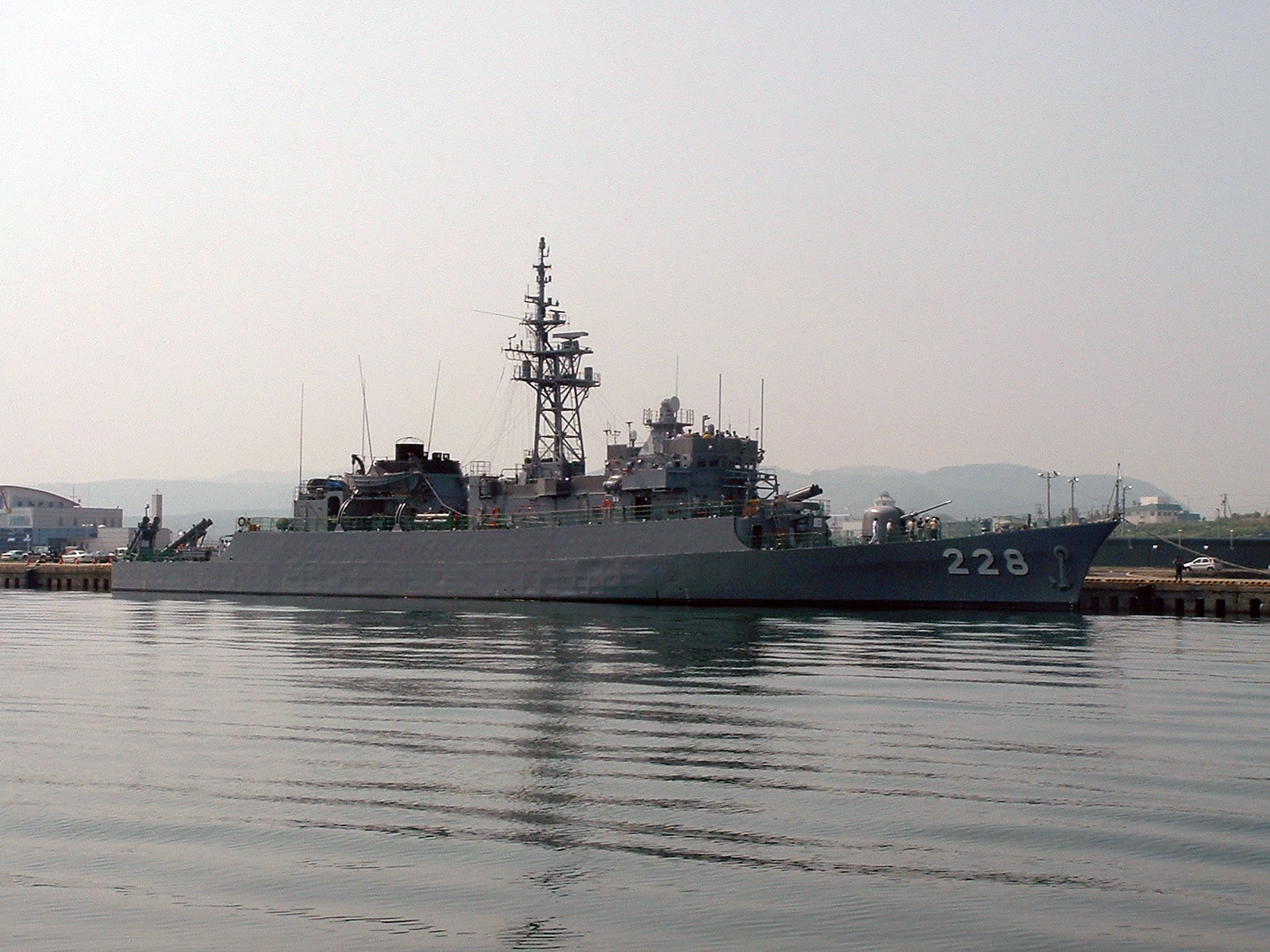
- JS Yūbetsu

History

Japan
- Name: Yūbetsu; (ゆうべつ)
- Namesake: Yūbetsu
- Ordered: 1980
- Builder: Hitachi, Maizuru
- Laid down: 14 January 1982
- Launched: 25 January 1983
- Commissioned: 14 February 1984
- Decommissioned: 25 June 2010
- Stricken: May 2012
- Home port: Ominato
- Identification: Pennant number: DE-228
- Fate: Scrapped

General characteristics
- Class & type: Yūbari-class destroyer escort
- Displacement: 1,470 tons standard; 1,690 tons full load
- Length: 91 m (298 ft 7 in)
- Beam: 10.8 m (35 ft 5 in)
- Draft: 3.6 m (11 ft 10 in)
- Propulsion: CODOG, two shafts (controllable pitch propellers); 1 × Kawaksaki /RR Olympus TM3B gas turbine 24,700 hp (18,400 kW) + 1 × Kawaksaki 6DRV diesel
- Speed: 25 knots (46 km/h; 29 mph)
- Complement: 95
- Armament: 1 × Otobreda 76 mm gun; 8 × McDonnell Douglas Harpoon SSM; 1 × Bofors 375 mm ASW rocket launcher; 2 × HOS-301 triple 324 mm (12.8 in) torpedo tubes

JS Yūbetsu (DE-228) was a Yūbari-class destroyer escort of the Japanese Maritime Self-Defense Force.

== Development and design ==
The Maritime Self-Defense Force has further developed the Coast Guard (PCE) plan, which was considered in the Third Defense Build-up Plan as an alternative to the conventional submarine chaser (PC), and JS Ishikari in the post-fourth defense plan in 1977.

However, the 52DE was too small and lacked room. The lack of ability to act in stormy weather due to the ship's shape was also a problem. The original plan was to build more ships of the same type as a replacement for the retired submarine chaser, but before the commissioning of the ship, the ships built in 1979 were homomorphic ships with a slightly expanded ship type.

From the above background, the basic design is an advanced version of 52DE. The basic plan number is E111. The central hull form has been followed and looks very similar, but the standard displacement has been increased by about 200 tons, the total length has been extended by 6 meters, and the overall width and depth have also increased slightly. Along with this, the floor area of the battle area including CIC and the living area has increased, and the warehouse has been expanded to improve the living and living environment. The fuel tank was also enlarged and the fuel load increased by about 35 percent, which led to an extension of the cruising range. The engine had the same configuration as the 52DE, and was a CODOG system with Mitsubishi Heavy Industries 6DRV35 / 44 diesel engine and Kawasaki-Rolls-Royce Olympus TM3B gas turbine engine.

== Construction and career ==
The destroyer escort was laid down on 14 January 1982 and launched on 25 January 1983 at Hitachi Zosen Corporation Shipyard in Maizuru. Yūbetsu commissioned on 14 February 1984.

The vessel was engaged in disaster dispatch activities due to the Hokkaido Nansei-oki Earthquake that occurred on 12 July 1993.

On 24 March 1997, the 35th escort corps was renamed to the 27th escort corps due to the revision of the corps number. On 3 April 2006, the 27th Escort Corps was abolished and transferred to the 25th Escort Corps of the Ominato District Force. On 26 March 2008, the 25th escort corps was renamed to the 15th escort corps due to a major reorganization of the Self-Defense Fleet, and was reorganized under the escort fleet. Yūbetsu was decommissioned on 25 June 2010 and sent to scrap few years later.

== Gallery ==
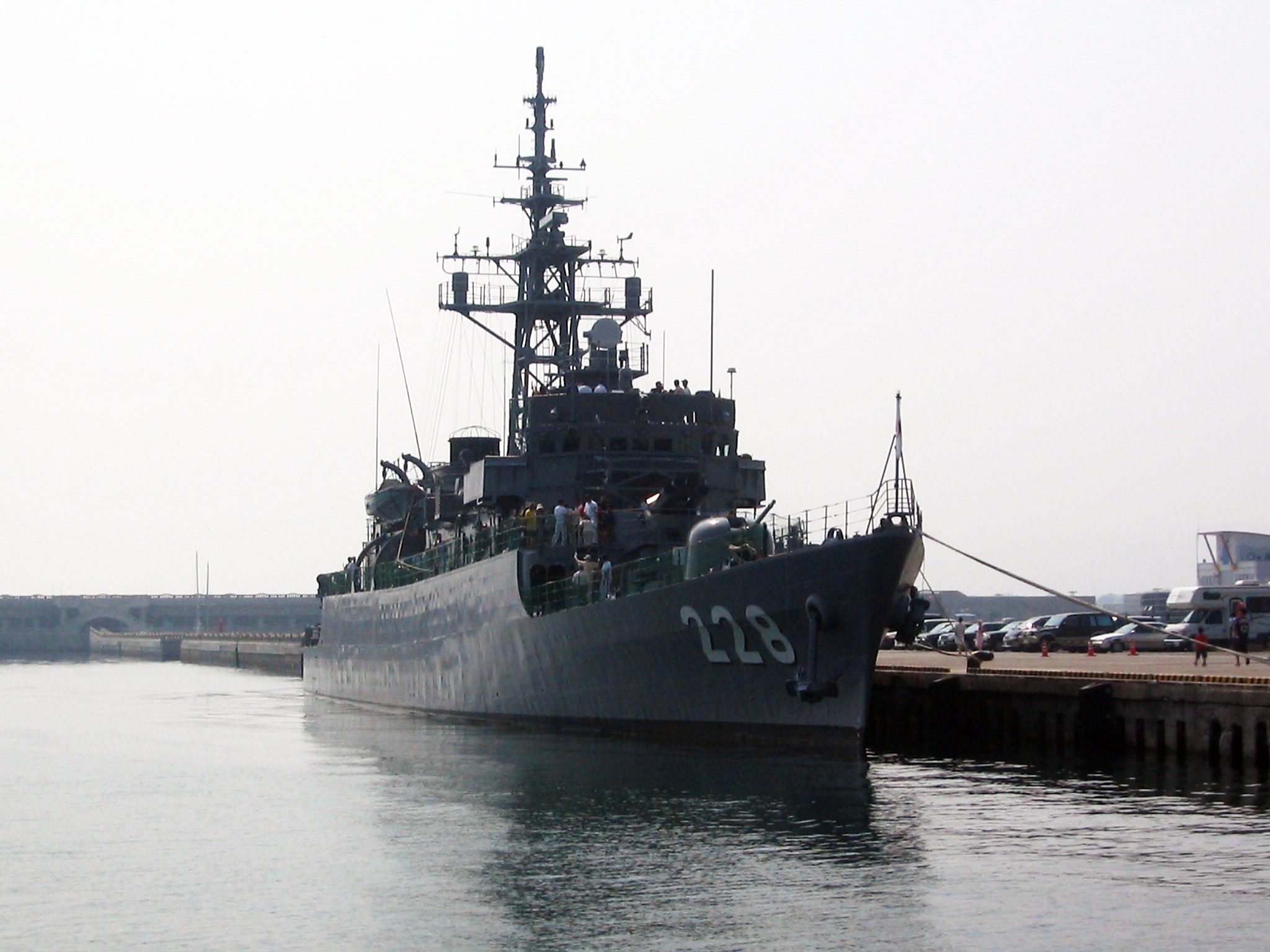
JS Yūbetsu on 30 July 2004.

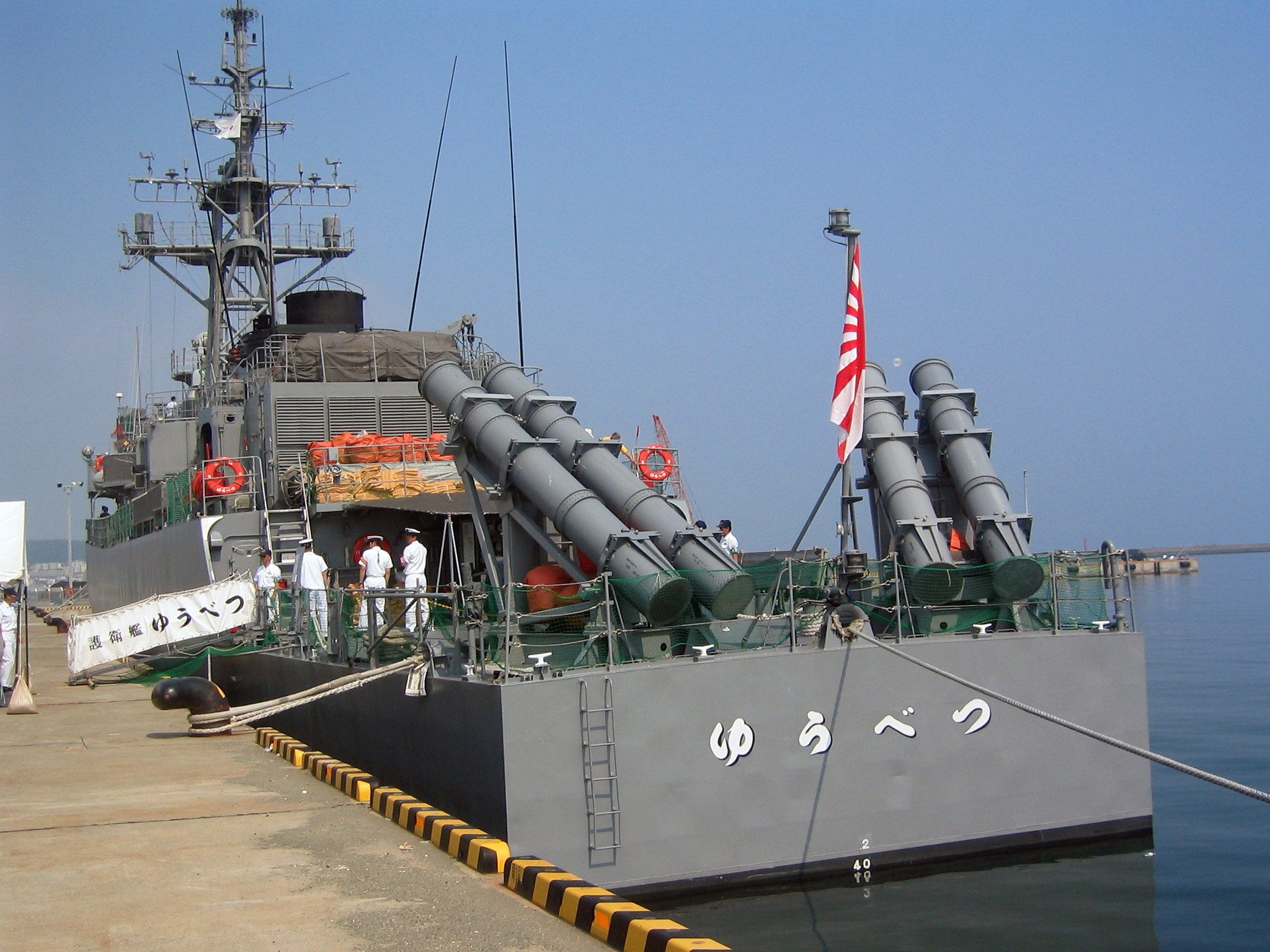
JS Yūbetsu on 30 July 2004.

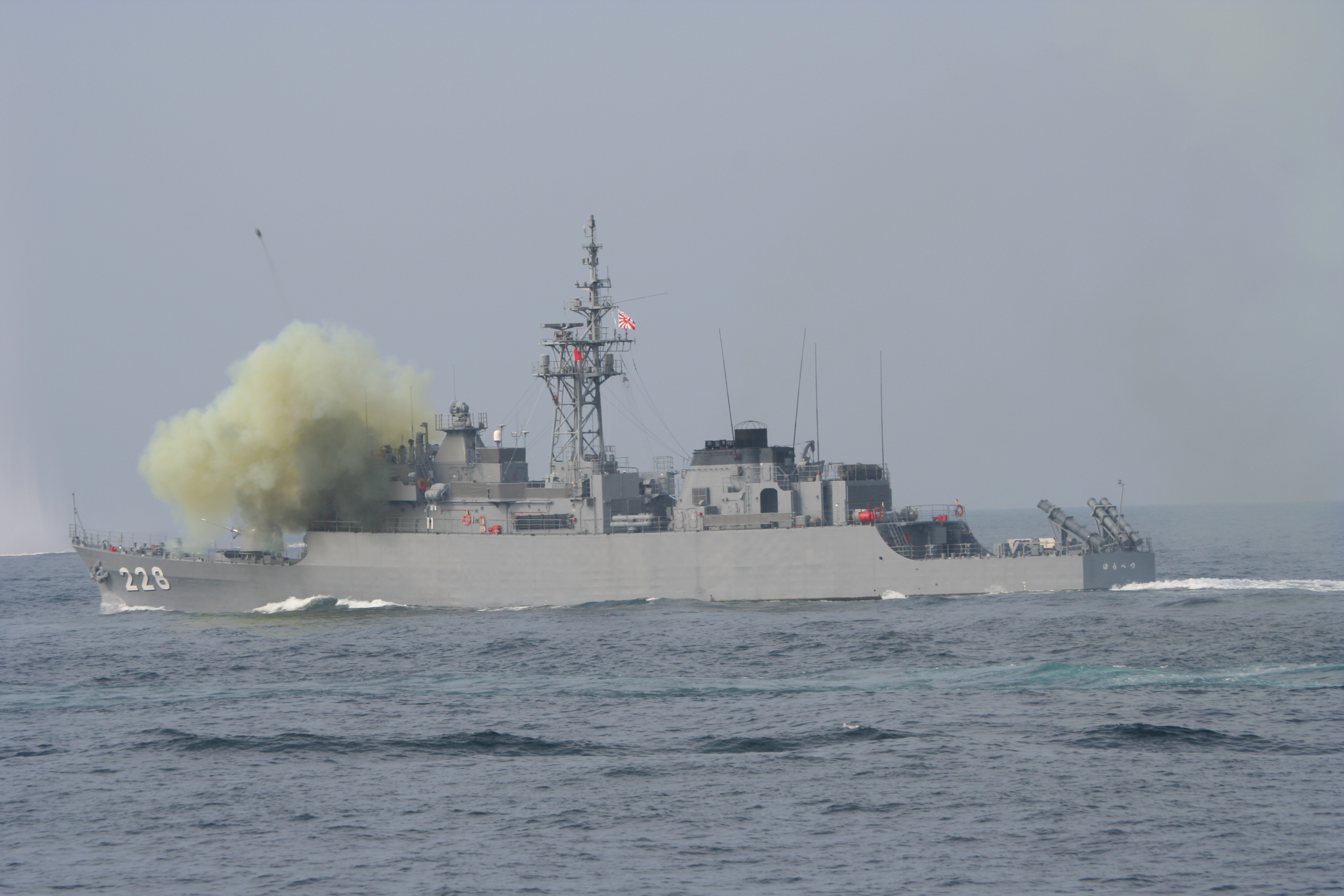
JS Yūbetsu fires her 375 mm Bofors on 29 October 2007.

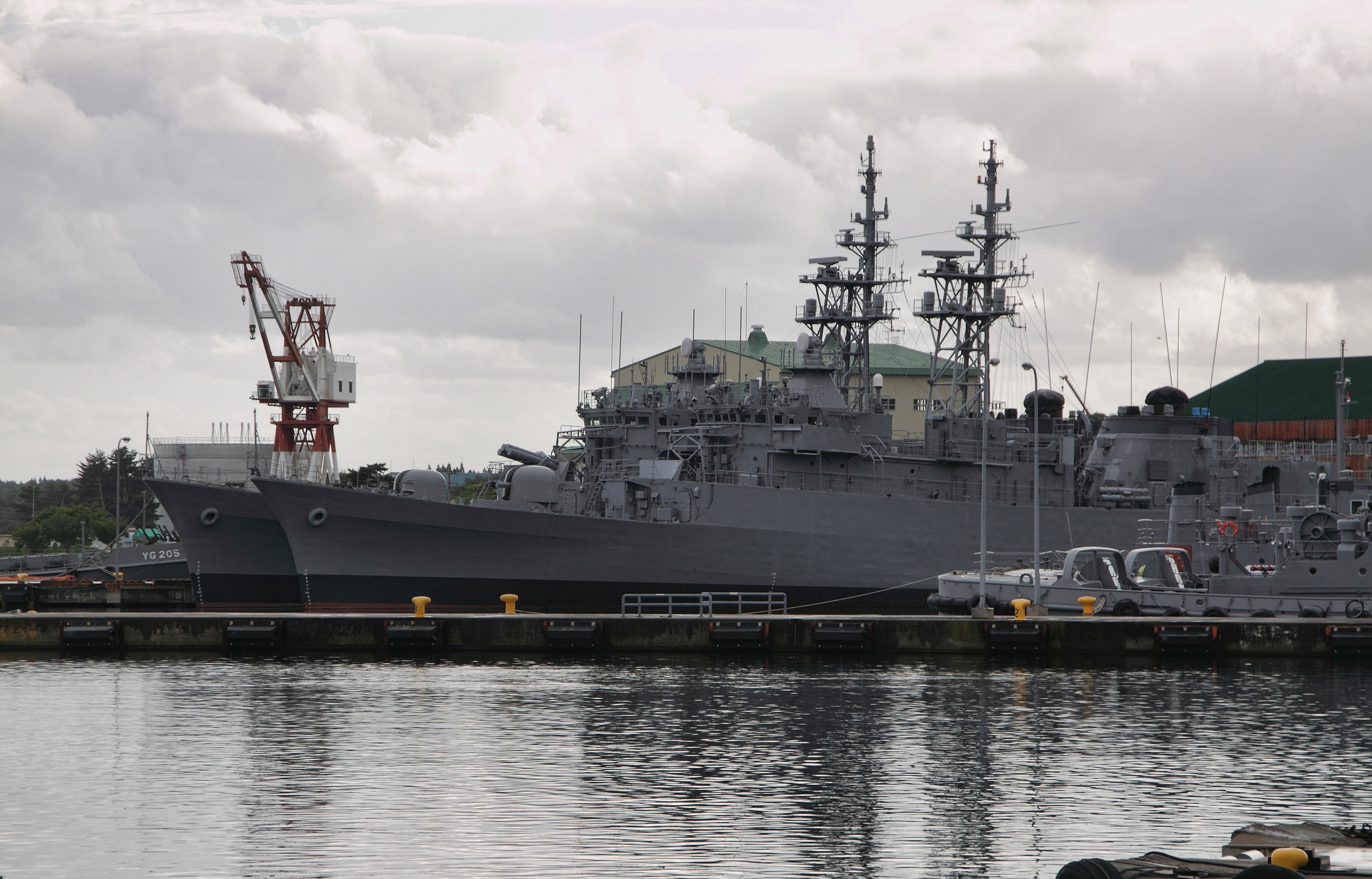
JS Yūbetsu and JS Yūbari on 6 September 2011.
