= FCS-1 =

Japanese ship gun fire-control system

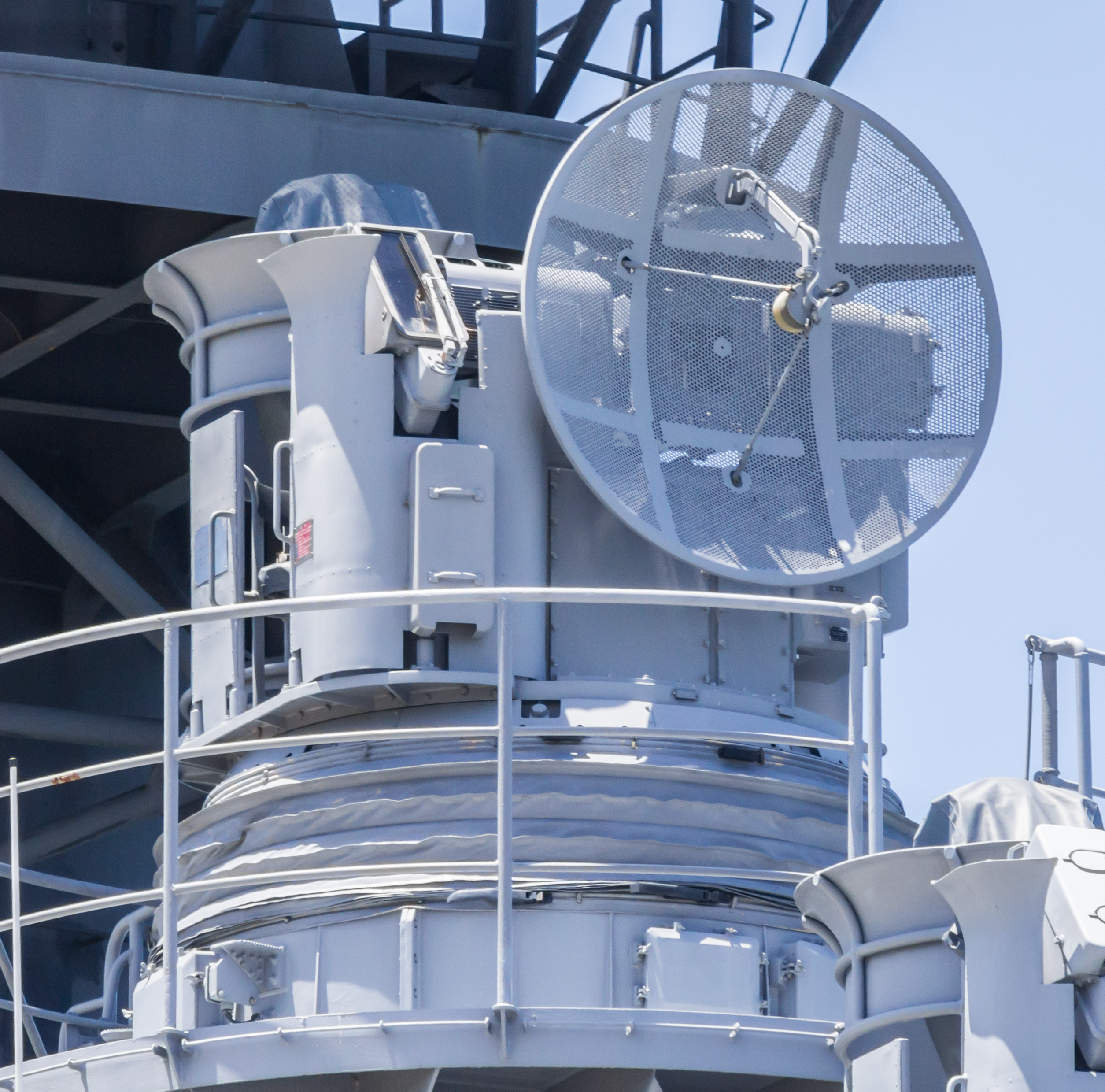
- FCS-1A on JDS Shirane
- Country of origin: Japan
- Introduced: 1972
- Type: Tracking
- Frequency: X band

FCS-1 was a Japanese ship gun fire-control system (GFCS).

== History ==
In the 1950s, the Japan Maritime Self-Defense Force (JMSDF) used Mk 57 and Mk 63 as its main GFCS, but they were becoming obsolete. JMSDF was eager to introduce automated GFCS that supported automatic radar tracking, such as the American Mk 56, but it was rejected by the US Navy. Under the FY1955 program, a budget for purchasing one automated FCS overseas was approved. Jaberg (manufactured by Contraves) was selected and installed in JDS Harukaze in 1958. It was used for testing and research.

Based on the results, the Technical Research and Development Institute (技術研究本部, Gijutsu-kenkyū-honbu) began development of a domestic GFCS. In FY1965, a prototype was installed on JDS Harusame. This system got a good result and was titled Type 68. However, it was too advanced for the fleet, so a simplified model was developed and installed on JDS Nagatsuki in 1968, named Type 72, which became a mass-production model.

== Design ==
The prototype used a combination of unmanned radar director and manned electro-optical director, and was capable of track while scan (TWS). These two directors were integrated into one manned director as American Mk 56. TWS capability was omitted in the mass-production models.

An electromechanical analog computer was used for fire-control. In the mass-production models, transistors were introduced for their radar and computer (replacing vacuum tubes). The prototype model measured the angular velocity of the line of sight by gyroscopic means (relative-rate) systems, and in the mass-production models, linear-rate systems were introduced.

The two sub-types were: FCS-1A for 5-inch guns and FCS-1B for 3-inch guns.

== Operators ==
Japan Maritime Self-Defense Force

- FCS-1A
  - JDS Nagatsuki
  - Haruna-class destroyer
  - Shirane-class destroyer
  - Tachikaze-class destroyer (earlier batch)
- FCS-1B
  - Minegumo-class destroyer (latter batch)
  - Yamagumo-class destroyer (latter batch)
  - Chikugo-class destroyer escort
  - JDS Miura
  - JDS Sōya
