= JS Ishikari =

Japanese Ishikari class destroyer

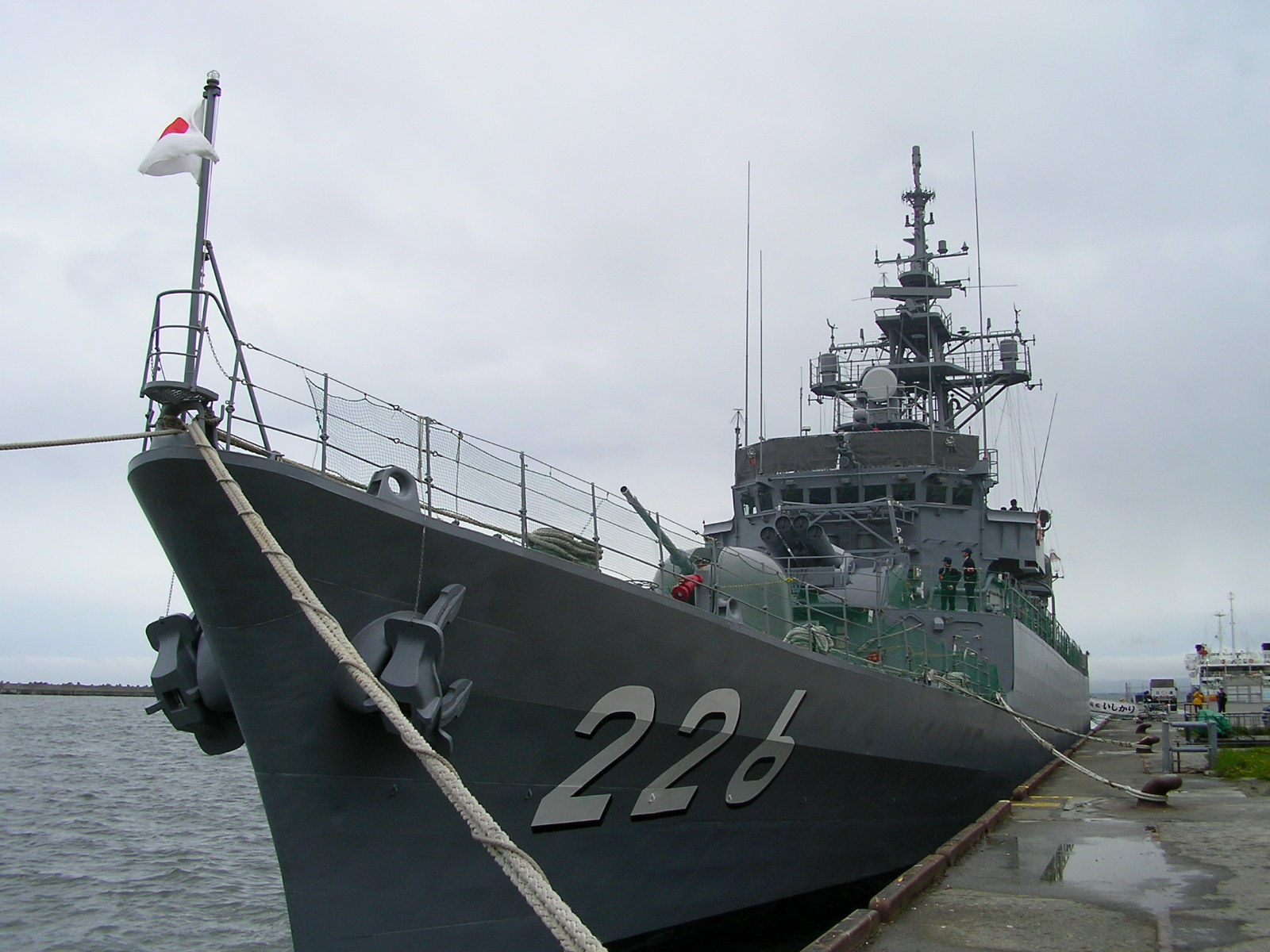
- JS Ishikari in 2006

History

Japan
- Name: Ishikari; (いしかり)
- Namesake: Ishikari
- Ordered: 1977
- Builder: Mitsui, Tamano
- Laid down: 17 May 1979
- Launched: 18 March 1979
- Commissioned: 28 March 1980
- Decommissioned: 17 October 2007
- Stricken: November 2008
- Identification: Pennant number: DE-226
- Fate: Scrapped
- Notes: Her anchor is preserved in Ishikari, Hokkaido

Class overview
- Preceded by: Chikugo class
- Succeeded by: Yūbari class

General characteristics
- Type: Destroyer escort
- Displacement: 1,290 tons standard; 1,450 tons full load
- Length: 278.8 ft (85.0 m)
- Beam: 35.4 ft (10.8 m)
- Draft: 11.8 ft (3.6 m)
- Propulsion: CODOG, two shafts (controllable pitch propellers); 1 × Kawaksaki /RR Olympus TM3B gas turbine 24,700 hp (18.4 MW); 1 × Kawaksaki 6DRV diesel
- Speed: 25 knots (46 km/h; 29 mph)
- Complement: 95
- Armament: 1 × Otobreda 76 mm gun; 8 × Boeing Harpoon SSM; 1 × Bofors 375 mm ASW rocket launcher; 2 × HOS-301 triple 324 mm (12.8 in) torpedo tubes

JS Ishikari (DE-226) was the first destroyer escort with a gas turbine engine and surface-to-surface missiles of the Japanese Maritime Self-Defense Force. She is the successor of the earlier Chikugo class. Entering service in 1981, she remained active until 2007 when she was decommissioned.

== Design ==
At first, this ship was planned to belong to the new ship classification, PCE (Patrol Coastal ships, Escort) to replace small submarine chasers and old destroyer escorts with limited anti-submarine warfare (ASW) capability against new nuclear-powered submarines. But finally, it was decided to change her classification to the ordinary destroyer escort. This class is quite epoch-making for the destroyer escorts of the JMSDF as follows:

The CODOG propulsion system. This was the first ship with the gas turbine engine in the JMSDF. The Rolls-Royce Olympus TM-3B manufactured by the Kawasaki Heavy Industries under license was used for boosting. The cruising engine is the Kawasaki 6DRV 35/44 diesel engine developed by the Technical Research and Development Institute (TRDI).

The centre-superstructure style. Whereas the JMSDF was inclined to adopt the flush decker style, in this ship, the superstructure is at the center of the ship to save space. This was a very controversial decision, and because of this decision, there has been criticism about the oceangoing capability of this ship.

The simplified but sufficient C4ISR system was installed aboard the ship. The design was not equipped with an air-search radar unlike her predecessors. Alternatively, she had the OPS-28 surface search and target acquisition radar which could deal with low-altitude aircraft and missiles. The FCS-2 gun fire-control system also had air-search capability. As the tactical data processing system, she had the OYQ-5 being capable of receiving data automatically from other ships via Link-14 (STANAG 5514; the data link with the Radioteletype).

The design also had a brand-new weapon systems. The Ishikari design was equipped with eight Boeing Harpoon surface-to-surface missiles as the key weapon system whereas traditional Japanese frigates were specialized in anti-submarine warfare. According to this mission concept, its predecessor's Mark 16 GMLS for the ASROC system was removed. A modern Otobreda 76 mm gun replaced its predecessor's older 3-inch gun and automation greatly reduced the number of crew needed.

== Construction and history ==
The ship was built at the Mitsui Shipbuilding & Engineering Tamano office at Tamano, Okayama. She was commissioned on 28 March 1981, and was deployed at the Ominato District Force (home-ported at Mutsu, Aomori). The Ominato District is the northernmost district of the JMSDF and forefront against the Russian Pacific Fleet. It was decided that Ishikari was too small to continue production, so the vessel was succeeded by the Yūbari class two years later.

== Gallery ==
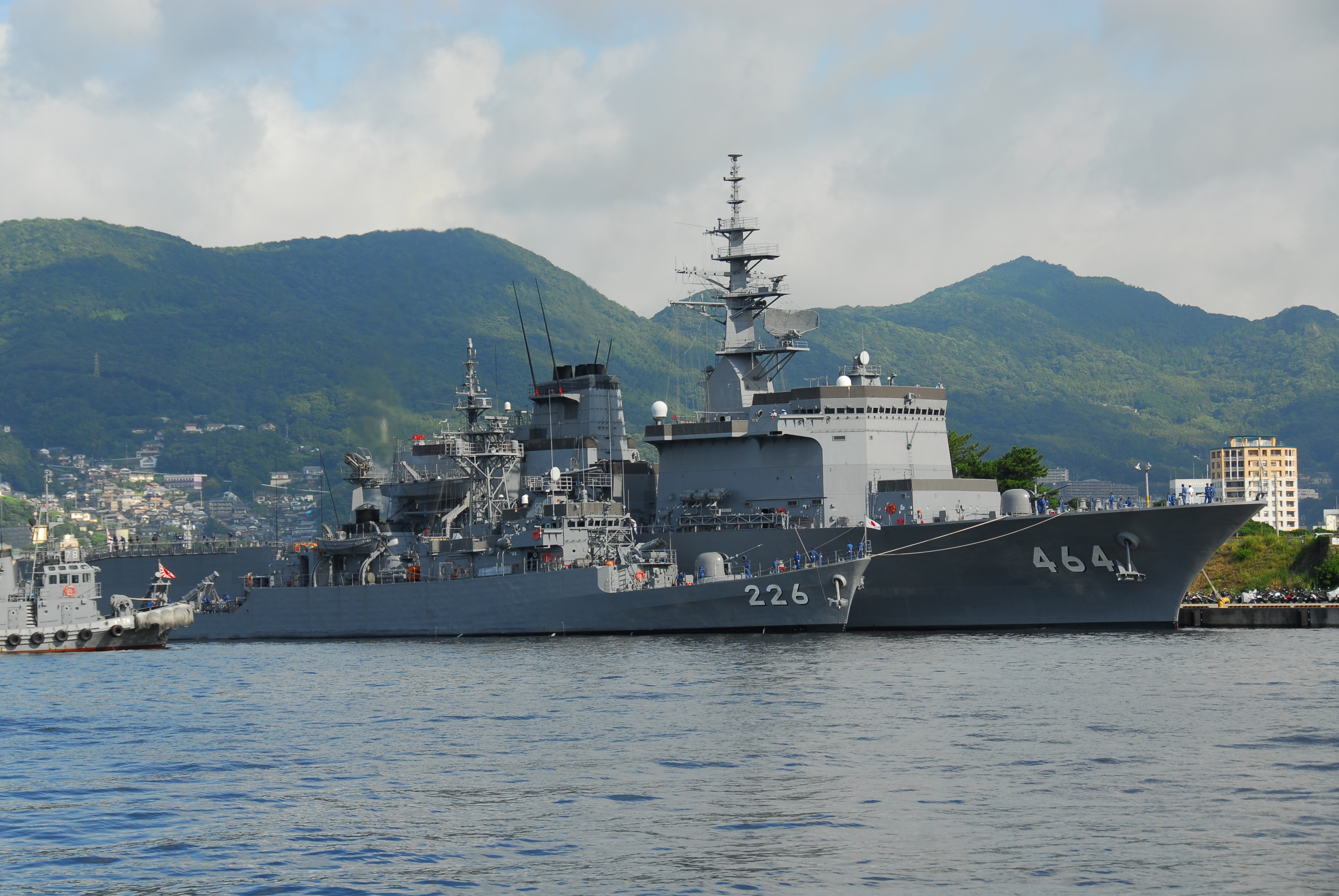
JS Ishikari alongside JS Bungo on 24 September 2007.

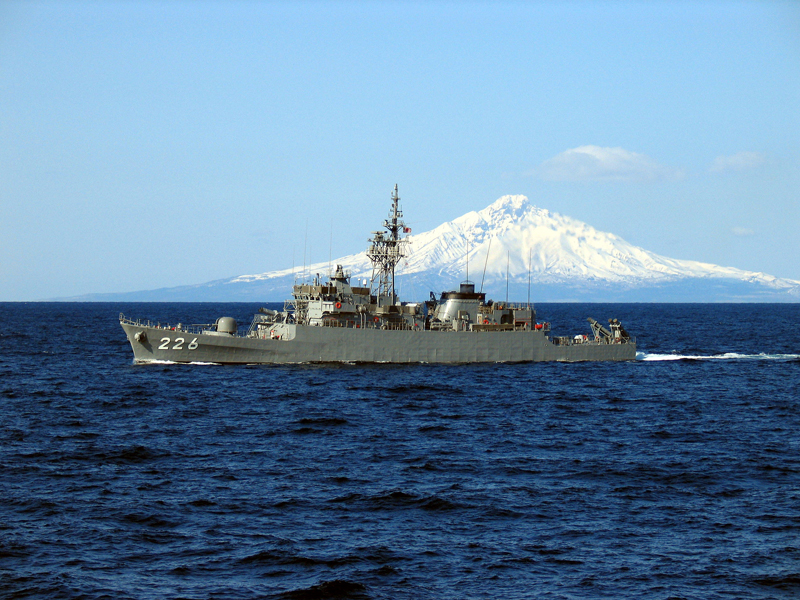
JS Ishikari underway on 27 April 2014.

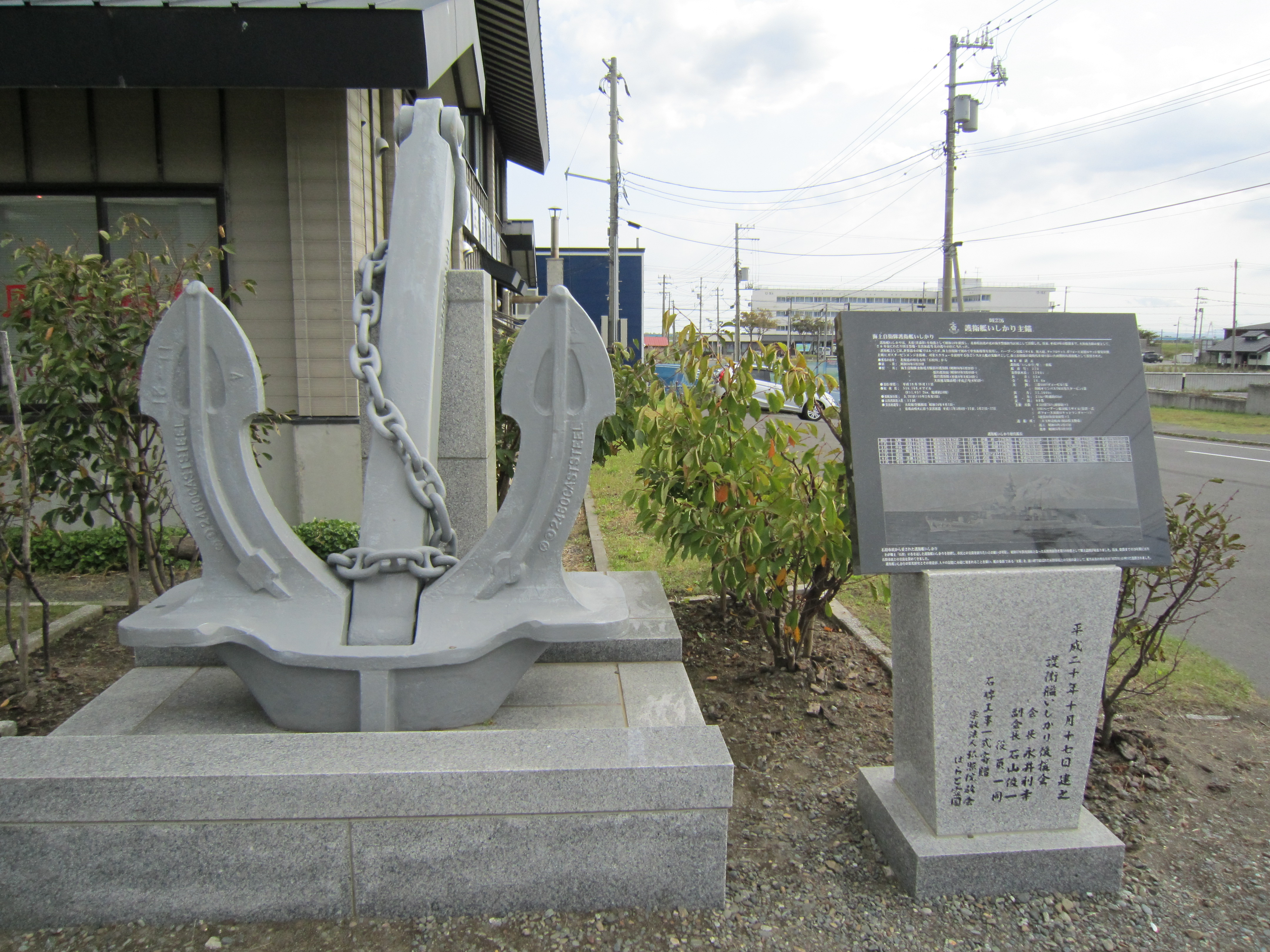
JS Ishikari's anchor on display on 1 October 2017.
