= Yūbari-class destroyer escort =

Destroyer escort of the Japanese Maritime Self-Defense Force

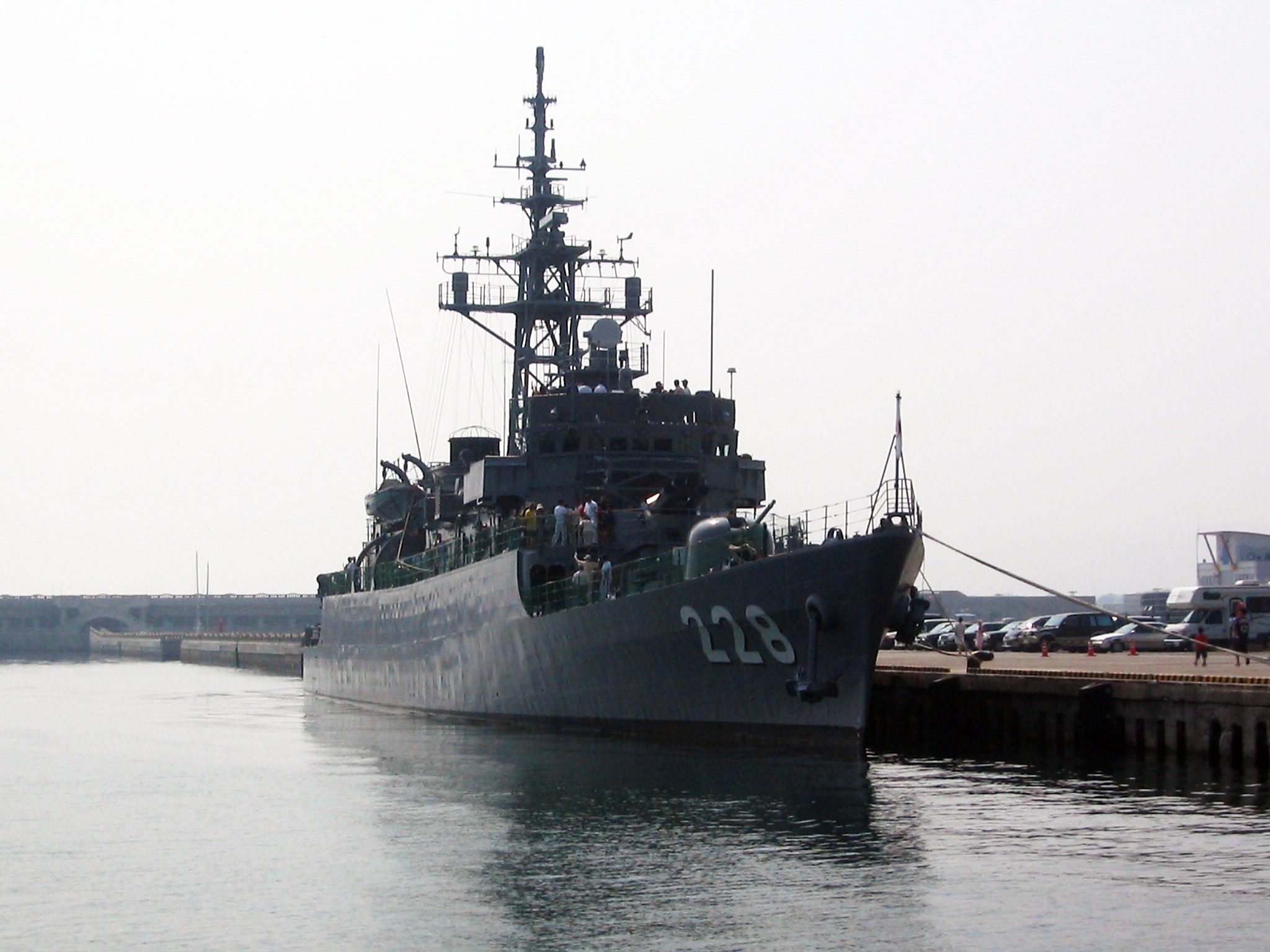
- JS Yūbetsu

Class overview
- Operators: Japan Maritime Self-Defense Force
- Preceded by: Ishikari class
- Succeeded by: Abukuma class
- Built: 1981–1983
- In commission: 1983–2010
- Completed: 2
- Retired: 2

General characteristics
- Type: Destroyer escort
- Displacement: 1,470 t (1,450 long tons) standard; 1,690 t (1,660 long tons) full load
- Length: 91 m (298 ft 7 in)
- Beam: 10.8 m (35 ft 5 in)
- Draft: 3.6 m (11 ft 10 in)
- Propulsion: CODOG, two shafts (controllable pitch propellers); 1 × Kawaksaki /RR Olympus TM3B gas turbine 24,700 hp (18,400 kW) + 1 × Mitsubishi 6DRV diesel
- Speed: 25 knots (46 km/h; 29 mph)
- Complement: 95
- Armament: 1 × Otobreda 76 mm gun; 8 × McDonnell Douglas Harpoon SSM; 1 × Bofors 375 mm ASW rocket launcher; 2 × HOS-301 triple 324 mm (12.8 in) torpedo tubes

The Yūbari-class destroyer escort (Note: Sometimes Yuubari depending on romanization.) (or frigate) of the Japanese Maritime Self-Defense Force is the successor to the Ishikari-class destroyer escort and primarily focused on anti-submarine warfare. The class comprised two ships and were in service from 1983 to 2010. They were followed by the Abukuma class.

== Description ==
This class was based on the design of the predecessor JS Ishikari but was enlarged with improved accommodation and fuel capacity. The ships have a standard displacement of 1,470 metric tons (1,450 long tons) and 1,690 t (1,660 long tons) at full load. They measure 91 meters (298 ft 7 in) long with a beam of 10.8 m (35 ft 5 in) and a draft of 3.5 m (11 ft 6 in). They have a complement of 95 personnel.

The class retained the CODOG propulsion system consisting of a Rolls-Royce Olympus TM-3B manufactured by the Kawasaki Heavy Industries under license used for boosting, creating 21,200 kilowatts (28,400 shp). The cruising engine is the Mitsubishi/MAN 6DRV 35/44 diesel engine, turning two shafts with controllable pitch propellers creating 3,470 kW (4,650 bhp), reaching a maximum speed of 25 knots (46 km/h; 29 mph).

The class is equipped with OPS-28 surface search and target acquisition radar. They utilize the FCS-2 fire-control system for the 76-millimeter (3.0 in) gun. For electronic support measures, the escorts are equipped with NOLR 6B system. The ships sport the SQS-36J hull-mounted sonar for subsurface targeting. For anti-missile defence, the Yūbaris have two Mk 36 SRBOC six-barrelled chaff launchers.

This class is equipped with eight Boeing Harpoon surface-to-surface missiles as the key weapon system, in two quad launchers. They also mount 76 mm/62 Compact gun. Provision for a Phalanx CIWS was made in the stern area, although it was never installed. They are also armed with two triple-mounted HOS-301 324 mm (12.8 in) torpedo tubes for Mk 46 Mod 5 torpedoes. For anti-submarine defense, the vessels mount a Bofors 375 mm rocket launcher.

== Ships in the class ==
Yūbari class construction data
Pennant no.	Name	Builder	Laid down	Launched	Commissioned	Decommissioned	Fate
DE-227	Yūbari	Sumitomo, Uraga	9 February 1981	22 February 1982	18 March 1983	25 June 2010	
DE-228	Yūbetsu (Note: Sometimes Yuubetsu depending on romanization.)	Hitachi, Maizuru	14 January 1982	25 January 1983	14 February 1984	25 June 2010	

== Construction and career ==
Only two units were ordered, the second in Fiscal Year (FY) 1980–81. However, a change in policy beginning in 1983 saw the Japanese Maritime Self-Defense Force change its focus from anti-submarine warfare defense to offshore sea lane and communication defense. As a result, no new hulls were purchased and they were only followed by the larger Abukuma class in FY 1987–88. Both ships of this class were deployed at the Ominato District Force (home-ported at Mutsu, Aomori). The Ominato District is the northernmost district of the JMSDF and forefront against the Russian Pacific Fleet.

== See also ==
- List of frigates
