= 503 (disambiguation) =

503 may refer to:

== In general ==
- 503 (number), a number in the 500s range
- AD 503 (DIII), a year in the Common Era
- 503 BC, a year Before the Common Era

== Places ==
- Area code 503, a North American telephone area code in northwestern Oregon
- Country code +503, for El Salvador
- 503 Evelyn, asteroid #503, the asteroid Evelyn, the 503rd asteroid registered, a Main-Belt asteroid
- Highway 503, a list of roads named "503"
- Blaine School District No. 503, Whatcom County, State of Washington, USA

== Military units ==
- No. 503 Squadron RAF, an Interwar British Royal Air Force bomber unit
- 503 Field Battery, Royal Artillery, British Army

=== Warships ===
- I-503, a Japanese WW2 submarine
- German submarine U-503, a German WW2 submarine
- USS LST-503, a U.S. WW2 tank landing ship
- TCG Beykoz (F-503), a Turkish navy frigate
- USS Frances II (SP-503), a U.S. Navy patrolboat
- TCG Hamit Hacı (M-503), a Turkish navy corvette
- JS Hakuryū (SS-503), a Japanese Maritime Self Defence Force submarine
- INS Hanit (503), an Israeli navy corvette
- BRP Lanao del Sur (LT-503), a Philippine navy tank landing ship
- USS Nueces (IX-503), a U.S. Navy ship
- USS Stevenson (DD-503), a WW2 U.S. Navy destroyer
- RVNS Vung Tau (HQ-503), a South Vietnamese green-water navy ship

== Transportation ==
- 503 Kingston Rd (street car line #503), Toronto, Ontario, Canada; a tram line service

=== Vehicular ===
- Allison 503, a turboprop aeroengine
- Rotax 503, an aeroengine
- Avro 503, a British military seaplane
- Potez 503, a French military airplane
- Latécoère 503, a French flying boat
- LEAF Antares 503, a Ukrainian ultralight
- BMW 503, a grand tourer
- Fiat 503, a small family car
- British Rail Class 503, passenger train class

== Other uses ==
- 503, a music track by Hans Zimmer on the Angels & Demons soundtrack
- 503 Service Unavailable, a computer networking HTTP status code
- Elliott 503, a computer
- FN 503, a semi-automatic pistol manufactured by FN Herstal
- A type of jeans, commonly in Levi's and Edwin
- A type of steel used for making bicycle frames

== See also ==
- Flight 503
- 503rd (disambiguation)
- DIII (disambiguation) (503 in Roman numerals)
