= Flight 503 =

Flight 503 may refer to:

- Indian Airlines Flight 503 (30 July 1998), a crash on take-off at Koichi, India
- Sabena Flight 503 (13 February 1955), a crash into a mountain in Italy

== See also ==
- 503 (disambiguation)
