= Hakuryu =

Hakuryu (白竜, White dragon) may refer to:

- Hakuryu (actor), Japanese actor
- a character from Saiyuki manga
- a character from Pokémon
- A character from Magi – The Labyrinth of Magic
- JS Hakuryū (SS-503), a Japanese Sōryū-class submarine
