= Al-Nu'man II ibn al-Aswad =

Tenth Lakhmid king (497–503)

- King of the Lakhmid state
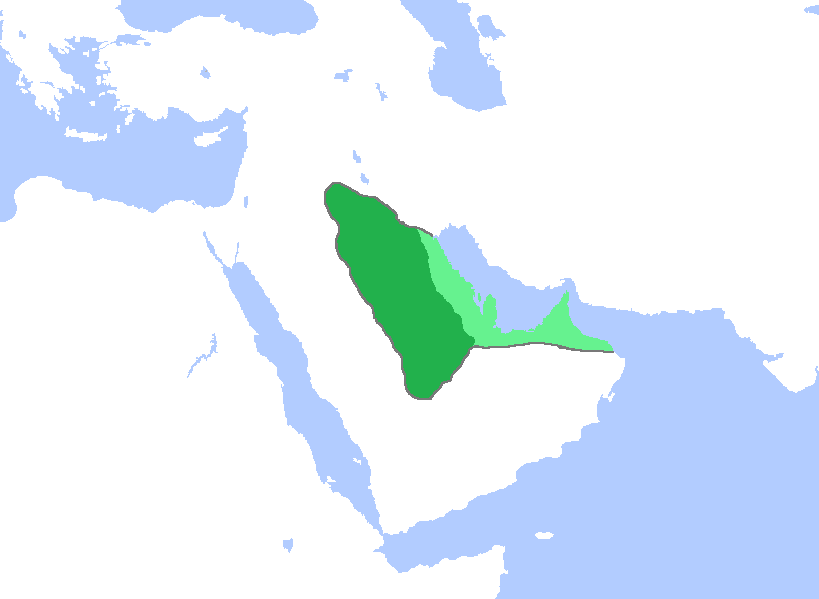
- Reign: CE 497–503
- Predecessor: Al-Mundhir II
- Successor: Abu Ya'fur ibn Alqama
- Born: c. 5th century
- Died: August c. 503
- Issue: Imru-l-Qays III ibn an-Numan
- House: Lakhmids
- Father: Al-Aswad bin Al-Mundhir
- Mother: Umm al-Mulk bint 'Amr ibn Hajar al-Kindi
- Religion: Nestorian Christianity

Al-Nu'man II ibn al-Aswad (Arabic: النعمان بن الأسود) was the tenth Lakhmid king, reigning in 497–503 AD. His mother was Umm al-Mulk bint 'Amr ibn Hajar al-Kindi, the sister of al-Harith ibn 'Amru, a Kindite prince.

== Bibliography ==
- Frederiksen, R.; Schnelle, M.; Muth, S.; Schneider, P. (2016). Focus on Fortifications: New Research on Fortifications in the Ancient Mediterranean and the Near East. Oxbow Books. p. 399. ISBN 978-1-78570-134-4.
