= League 3 =

League 3 may refer to one of the following association football leagues:

- I-League 3 in India
- League 3 (Iran)
- Thai League 3
- Victorian State League 3 in Australia

== See also ==
- Division 3 (disambiguation)
