= Abu Ya'fur ibn Alqama =

Eleventh Lakhmid king (503–505)

- King of the Lakhmid state
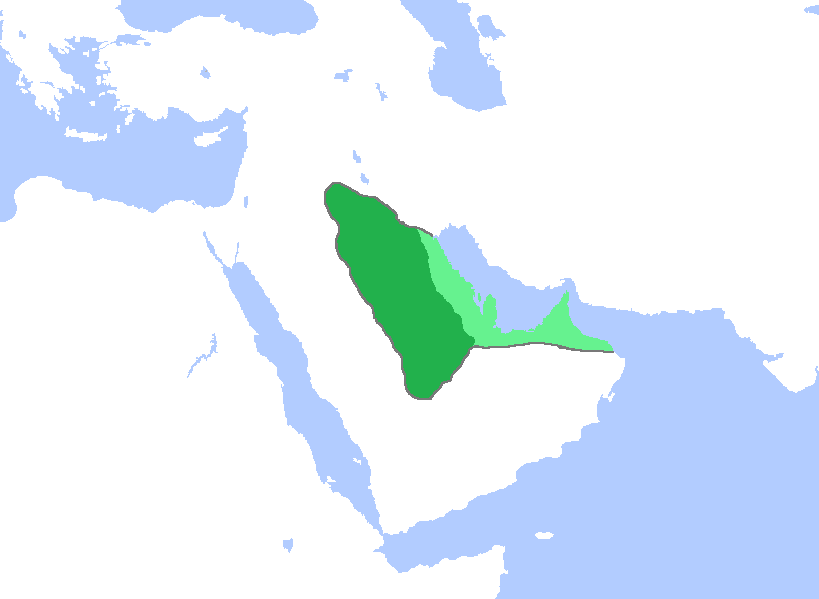
- Reign: CE 503–505
- Predecessor: Al-Nu'man II
- Successor: Al-Mundhir III
- Born: c. 5th century
- Died: August c. 505 near Circesium, modern-day Syria
- House: Lakhmids

Abu Ya'fur ibn Alqama ibn Malik ibn Uday ibn Dhumayl ibn Thawr ibn Asis ibn Ruba ibn Namara ibn Lakhm (Arabic: أبو يعفر بن علقمة بن مالك بن عدي بن الذميل بن ثور بن أسس بن ربي بن نمارة بن لخم) was a Lakhmid general who governed al-Hirah for some years after the death of al-Nu'man II ibn al-Aswad in 503.

Abu Ya'fur was of the Dhumayl, a noble family of Lakhmid – but non-dynastic – origin. Very little is known about his life beyond the Nu'man appointed him as a military governor of al-Hira because he was occupied with the wars against the Byzantines, where he was killed near Circesium. It is unclear whether Abu Ya'fur actually ruled the Lakhmids for a while instead of Nu'man's son, al-Mundhir III, or whether Mundhir assumed control of the tribe immediately upon his father's death.

He appears in a letter by Philoxenus of Mabbug in which Philoxenus tells Abu Yaf'ar of the "heresy" of Nestorius. Abu Yaf'ur resumed attacks on Byzantine-controlled land.
