= DIII =

DIII can refer to:

== In general ==
- 503 (number) in Roman numerals
- AD 503 (DIII), a year in the Common Era

== Transportation ==
- Mercedes D.III aircraft engine
- City of Detroit III (known as "D-III"), a Great Lakes and Detroit River passenger paddle steamer

=== Aircraft ===
- Albatros D.III, a 1916 German biplane fighter aircraft
- Fokker D.III, a 1916 German single-seat fighter aircraft
- Phönix D.III, a variant of the Austro-Hungarian First World War Phönix D.I biplane fighter
- Pfalz D.III, a 1917 German fighter aircraft
- Schütte-Lanz D.III, a 1918 German fighter aircraft prototype
- Siemens-Schuckert D.III, a 1917 German prototype single-seat fighter aircraft

== Other uses ==
- DIII-D, a tokamak located in San Diego, California, US
- Diablo 3 (stylized: Diablo III), a 2012 videogame
- Division 3 (disambiguation)

== See also ==
- 503 (disambiguation), "diii" when written in Roman numerals
- D3 (disambiguation)
