= 503rd Regiment =

503rd Regiment may refer to:

- 503rd Infantry Regiment, United States Army
- 503e Régiment de chars de combat, tank regiment of the French Army

== See also ==
- 503rd (disambiguation)
