= JS Asayuki =

Hatsuyuki-class destroyer

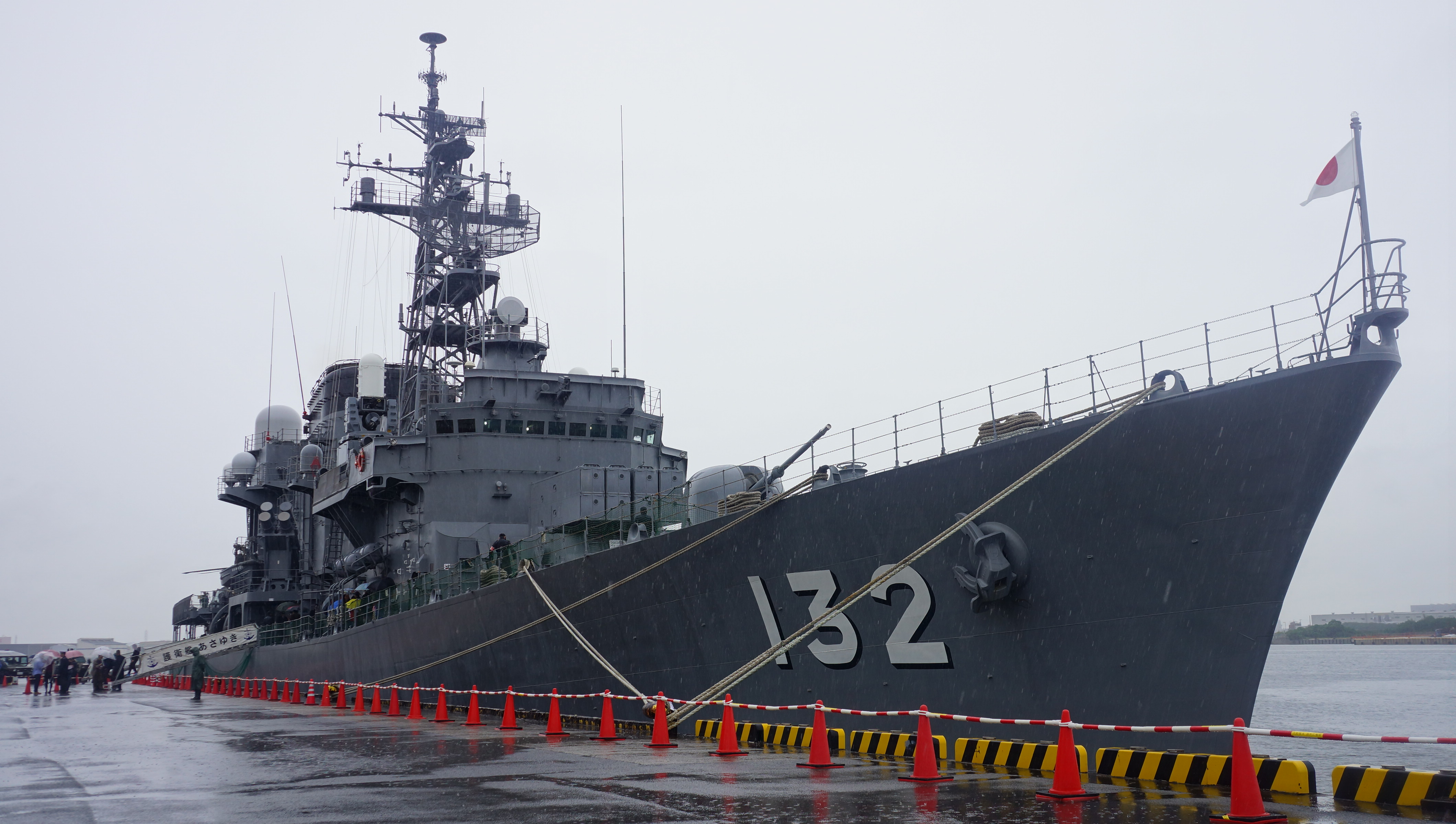
- JS Asayuki on 20 October 2013

History

Japan
- Name: Asayuki; (あさゆき)
- Ordered: 1982
- Builder: Sumitomo, Uraga
- Laid down: 22 December 1983
- Launched: 16 October 1985
- Commissioned: 20 February 1987
- Decommissioned: 16 November 2020
- Home port: Sasebo
- Identification: MMSI number: 431999546; Pennant number: DD-132
- Status: Decommissioned

General characteristics
- Class & type: Hatsuyuki-class destroyer
- Displacement: 2,950 tons standard, 4,000 tons hull load
- Length: 130 m (430 ft)
- Beam: 13.6 m (44 ft 7 in)
- Draft: 4.2 m (13 ft 9 in); 4.4 m (14 ft 5 in) (DD 129 to DD 132)
- Propulsion: 2 × KHI-RR TM3B gas turbines, 45,000 shp (34 MW); 2 × KHI-RR RM1C gas turbines, 9,900 shp (7.4 MW); 2 shafts, cp props
- Speed: 30 knots (35 mph; 56 km/h)
- Complement: 200
- Sensors & processing systems: OYQ-5 tactical data system; FCS-2 fire-control system; OPS-14 air search radar; OPS-18 surface search radar; OQS-4 hull sonar; OQR-1 TASS (in some ships)
- Electronic warfare & decoys: NOLR-6C intercept; OLT-3 jammer; Mark 36 SRBOC; Towed torpedo decoys
- Armament: 1 × OTO Melara 76 mm gun; 2 × 20 mm Phalanx CIWS; 2 × Harpoon SSM quad canisters; 1 × Sea Sparrow SAM octuple launcher; 1 × ASROC octuple launcher; 2 × triple 324 mm torpedo tubes
- Aircraft carried: 1 × HSS-2B or SH-60J helicopter
- Aviation facilities: Hangar and helipad

JS Asayuki (DD-132) was a Hatsuyuki-class destroyer of the Japanese Maritime Self-Defense Force.

== Development and design ==
Adopting Japan's first all-gas turbine engine (COGOG), equipped with well-balanced weapons such as helicopters, C4I systems, and various missiles, it is inferior to Western frigate at that time. It has been evaluated as a non-escort ship. Twelve ships were built as first-generation general-purpose escort vessels in the era of eight ships and eight aircraft, they supported the escort fleet for a long time, but now they are gradually retiring due to aging.

In addition, there are many changes to training ships, and up to three ships have been operated in the training fleet as Shimayuki-class training ships, but the decline has begun with the conversion of Hatakaze-class destroyers to training ships.

The core of the combat system is the OYQ-5 Tactical Data Processing System (TDPS), composed of one AN/UYK-20 computer and five OJ-194B workstations and capable of receiving data automatically from other ships via Link-14 (STANAG 5514).

This is the first destroyer class in the JMSDF equipped with the Sea Sparrow Improved basic point defense missile system. The IBPDMS of this class uses FCS-2 fire-control systems of Japanese make and one octuple launcher at the afterdeck. And in the JMSDF, OTO Melara 76 mm compact gun and Boeing Harpoon surface-to-surface missile are adopted from the ship of FY1977 including this class. Also, ships built in FY1979 and beyond carried Phalanx CIWS and were retrofitted to previous ships.

== Construction and career ==
The vessel was laid down on 22 December 1983 and launched on 16 October 1985 at Sumitomo Heavy Industries Shipyard in Uraga. Asayuki commissioned on 20 February 1987.

In 1990, she and JS Haruna left Sasebo for San Diego and Pearl Harbor for Exercise RIMPAC 1990.

From 21 March to 22 April 2014, the destroyer participated in the 2013 open sea practice voyage (flight) with the escort ship JS Shirane. From 15 March to 28 May 2016, Asayuki participated in the Japan-Australia joint training conducted in the waters around Sydney with the escort ship JS Umigiri and the submarine JS Hakuryū. On 16 November 2020, Asayuki was removed from the naval register. The final affiliation was the 13th escort fleet of the escort fleet, and the homeport was Sasebo.

== Gallery ==
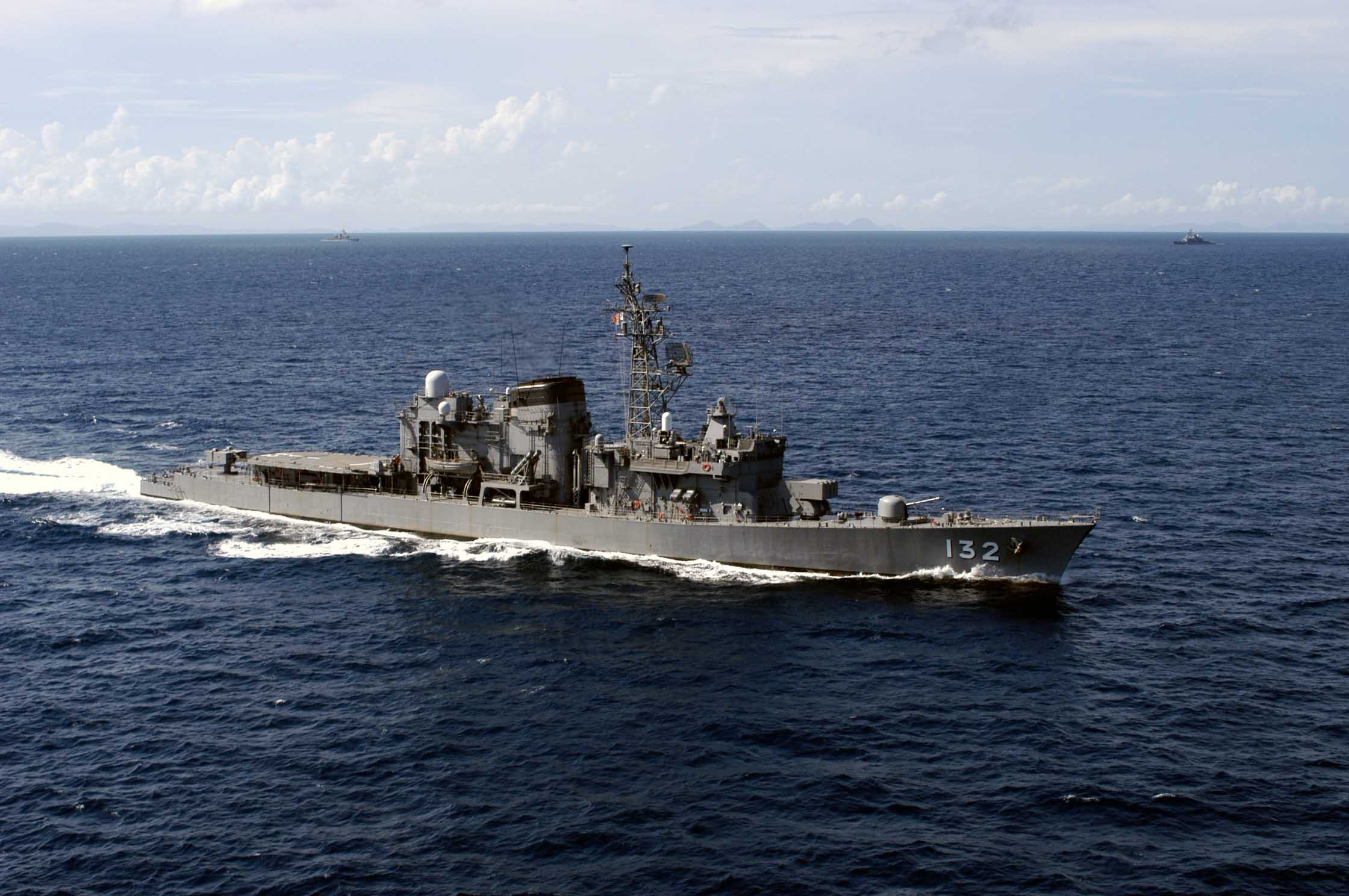
JS Asayuki underway, date unknown.

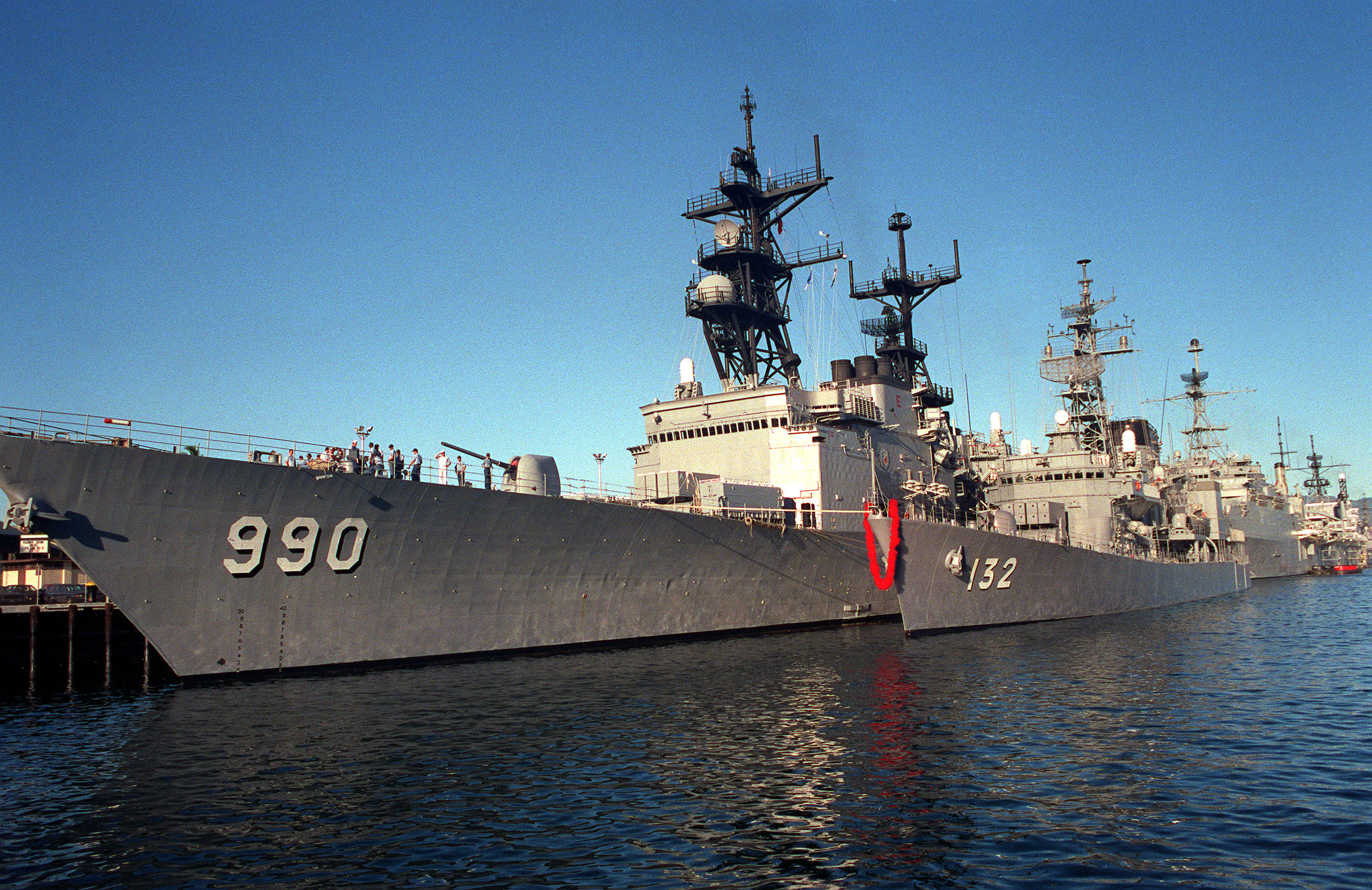
JS Asayuki and USS Ingersoll at Pearl Harbor on 1 February 1988.

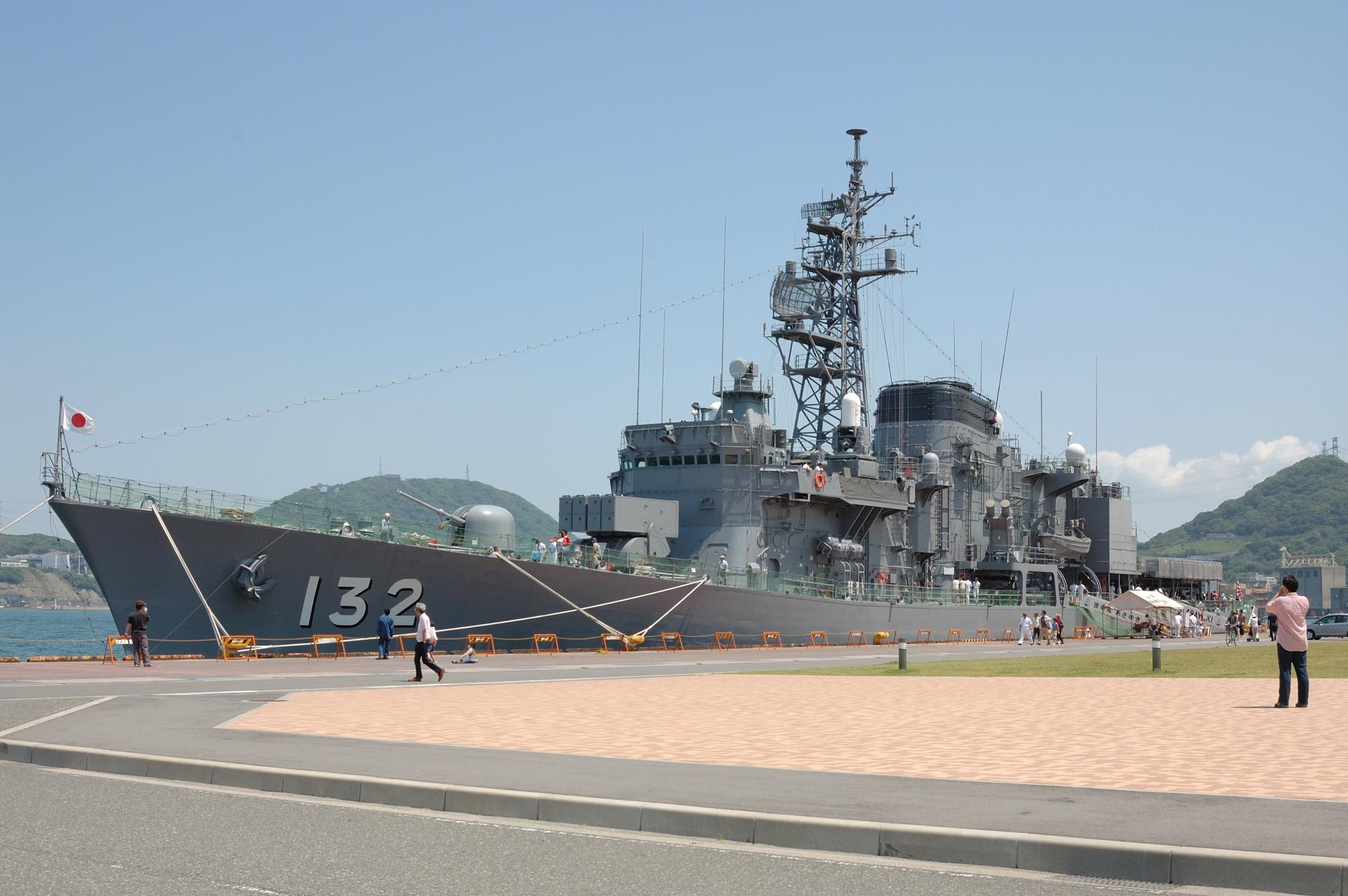
JS Asayuki at Moji on 22 May 2004.

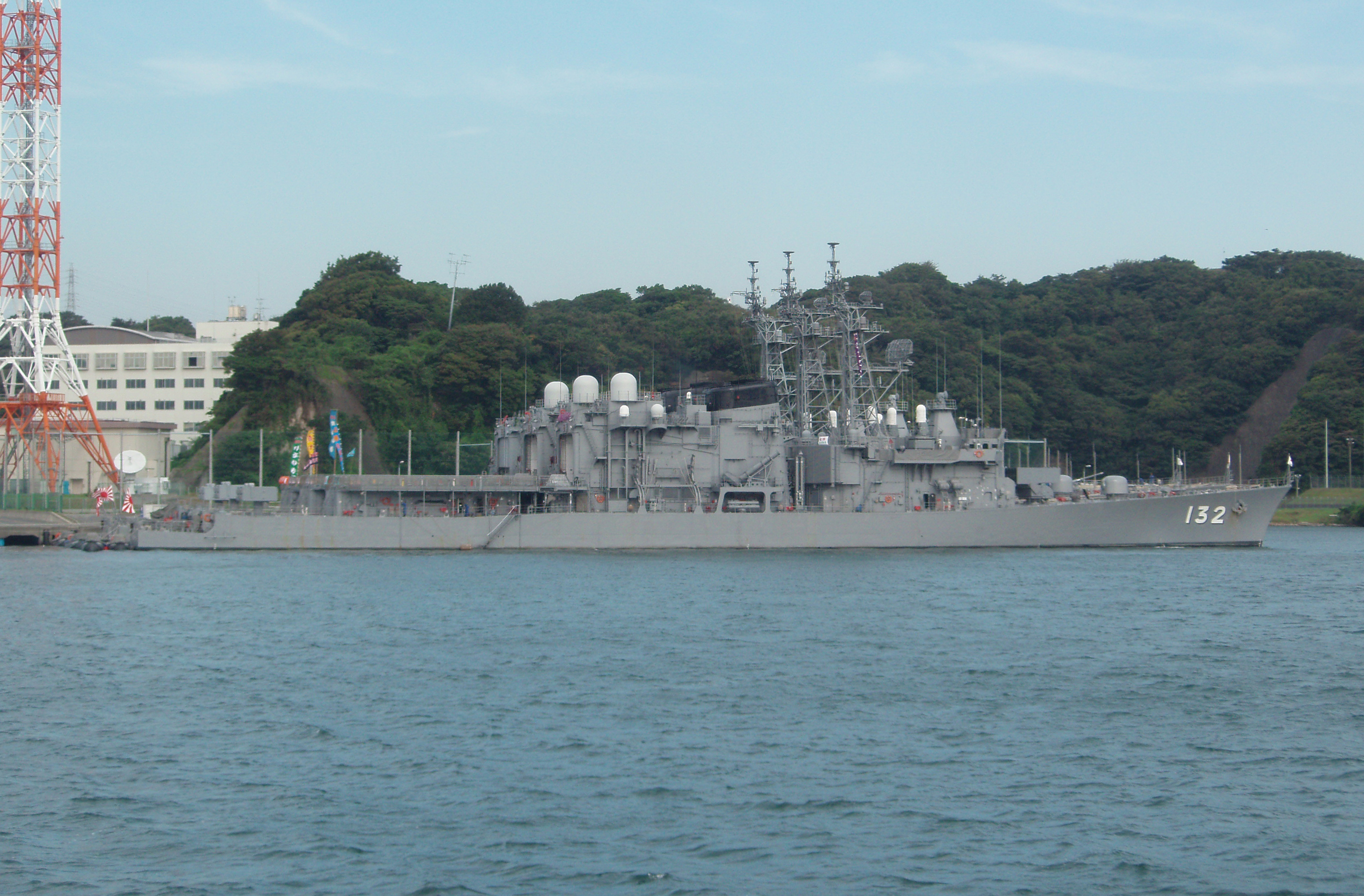
JS Asayuki on 17 October 2007.

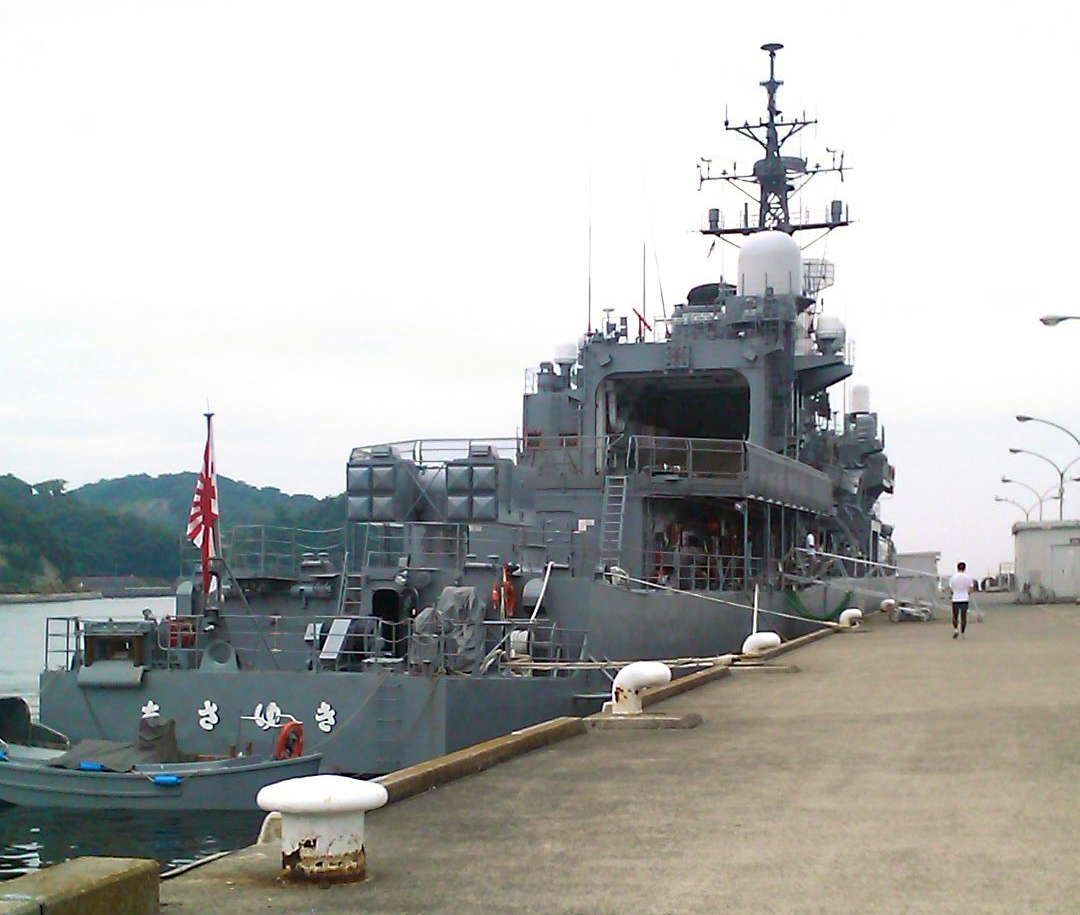
JS Asayuki at Yokosuka on 28 July 2011.

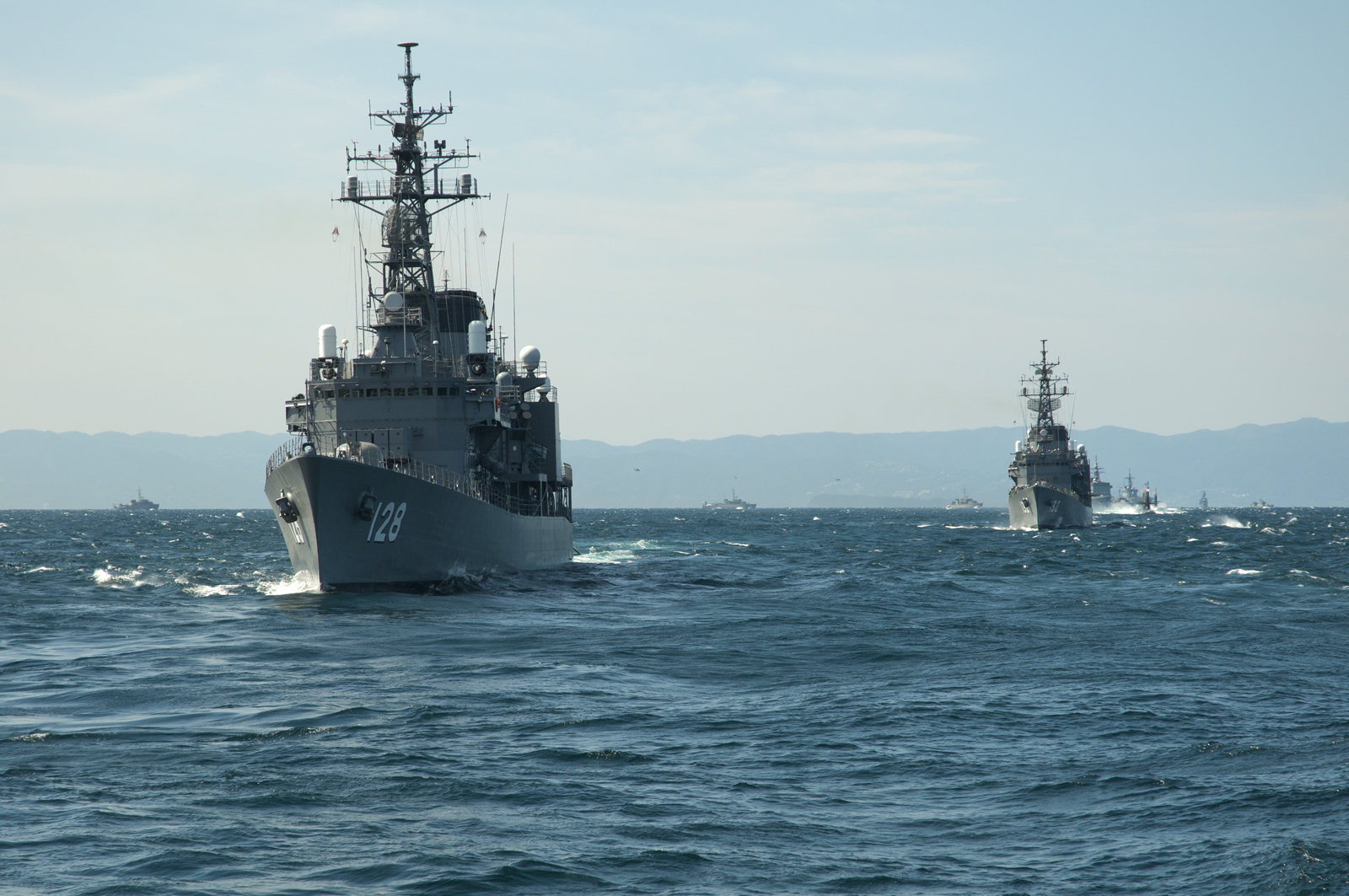
JS Asayuki on 8 October 2012.
