= JS Umigiri =

Asagiri-class destroyer

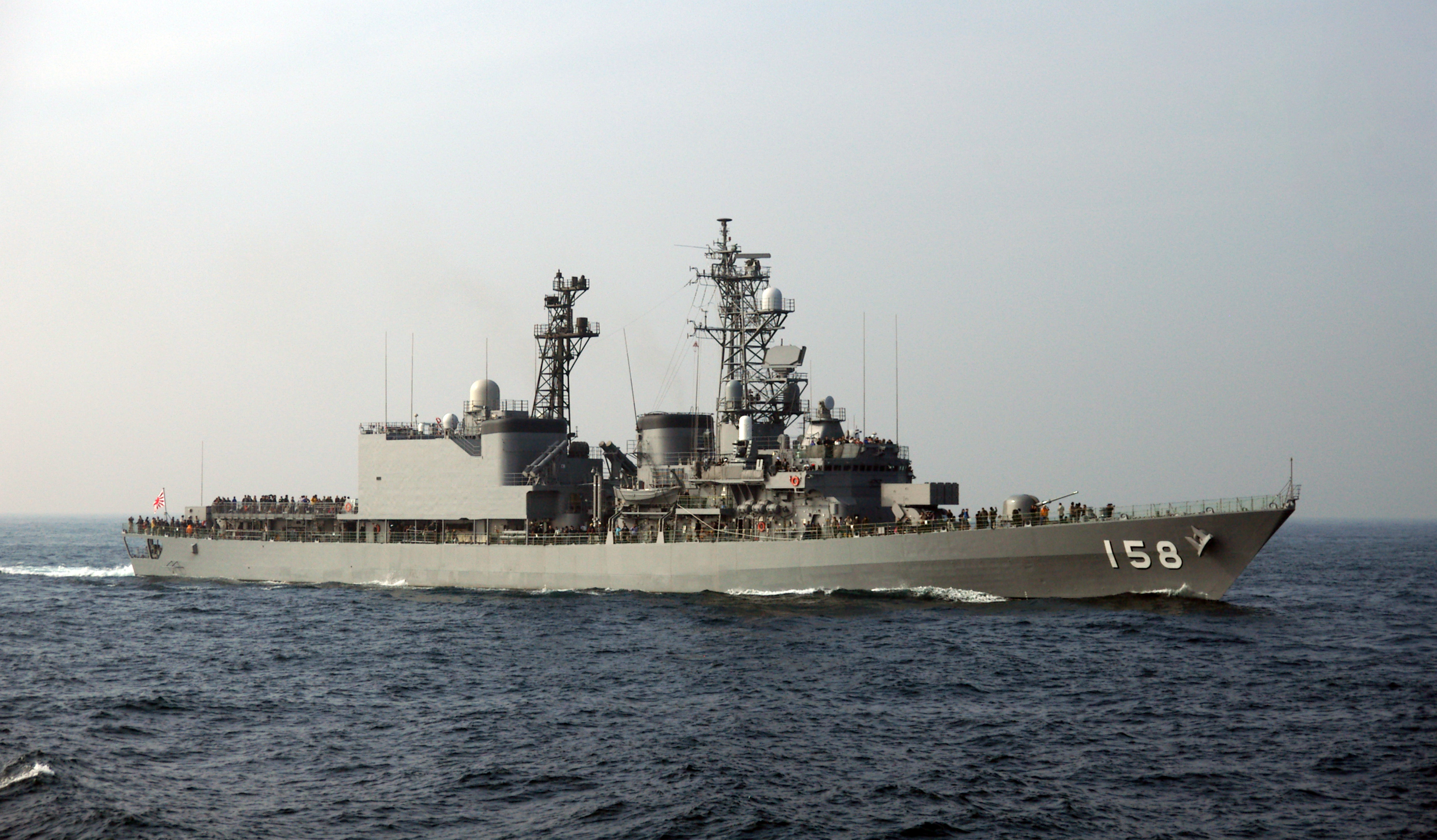
- JS Umigiri at Subic Bay on 29 October 2006

History

Japan
- Name: Umigiri; (うみぎり)
- Ordered: 1986
- Builder: IHI Corporation, Tokyo
- Laid down: 31 October 1988
- Launched: 9 November 1989
- Commissioned: 12 March 1991
- Home port: Kure
- Identification: MMSI number: 431999538; Pennant number: DD-158
- Status: Active

General characteristics
- Class & type: Asagiri-class destroyer
- Length: 137 m (449 ft 6 in)
- Beam: 14.6 m (47 ft 11 in)
- Draft: 4.5 m (14 ft 9 in)
- Propulsion: 4 gas turbines 54,000 shp (40,000 kW)
- Speed: 30 knots (56 km/h; 35 mph)
- Range: 8,030 nmi (14,870 km; 9,240 mi) at 14 knots (26 km/h; 16 mph)
- Complement: 220
- Sensors & processing systems: OYQ-6/7 CDS (w/ Link-11); OPS-14/24 air search radar; OPS-28 surface search radar; OQS-4A hull sonar; OQR-1 TACTASS
- Electronic warfare & decoys: NOLR-8 intercept; OLT-3 jammer; Mark 36 SRBOC
- Armament: 1 × Otobreda 76 mm gun; 2 × missile canister up to 8 Harpoon SSM; 2 × 20 mm Phalanx CIWS; 1 × Mk.29 Sea Sparrow SAM octuple launcher; 1 × Mk.16 ASROC anti-submarine rocket octuple launcher; 2 × HOS-302A triple 324 mm (12.8 in) torpedo tubes
- Aircraft carried: 1 SH-60J(K) anti-submarine helicopter

JS Umigiri (DD-158) is an Asagiri-class destroyer of the Japan Maritime Self-Defense Force.

== Development and design ==
The Asagiri class is equipped for combat and interception missions, and is primarily armed with anti-ship weapons. They carry two of the Mk-141 Guided Missile Launching System (GMLS), which are anti-ship missile systems. The ships are also fitted to be used against submarines. They also carries Mk-32 Surface Vessel Torpedo Tubes (SVTT), which can be used as an anti-submarine weapon. The ships have two of these systems abeam to starboard and to port. They are also fitted with an Oto-Melara 62-caliber gun to be used against sea and air targets.

They are 137 m (449 ft 6 in) long. The ships have a range of 8,000 nautical miles (15,000 km; 9,200 mi) at 14 knots (26 km/h; 16 mph) with a top speed of 30 knots (56 km/h; 35 mph). The ship can have up to 220 personnel on board. The ship is also fitted to accommodate for one aircraft. The ship's flight deck can be used to service a SH-60J9(K) Seahawk helicopter.

== Construction and career ==
Umigiri was laid down on 31 October 1988 and launched on 9 November 1989 by IHI Corporation of Tokyo. She was commissioned on 12 March 1991.

From 14 June to 1 September 1993, the destroyer participated in the US dispatch training with the escort vessels JS Shirane, JS Shimakaze and five P-3C aircraft.

In 1996, she participated in the Exercise RIMPAC 1996.

On 4 February 1997, after receiving information from the Yokohama Maritime Security Department of a ship that was distressed at sea about 60 kilometres (37 mi) southeast of Inuho Sai, Umigiri with the escort vessels JS Amagiri, JS Murasame, JS Chitose, 21st Fleet Air Group (7 HSS-2B helicopters, 1 SH-60J helicopter), 4th Fleet Air Group P-3C anti-submarine patrol aircraft, 1 UH-60J helicopter) responded. A helicopter rescued 34 crew members who were believed to be Chinese by carrying out rescue activities (all rescued together with 9 rescued by the Maritime Security Agency helicopter). On 24 March, the same year, Umigiri was transferred to the 46th Escort Corps of the 1st Escort Corps Group. On the same day, the 46th escort corps was renamed to the 5th escort corps due to the revision of the corps number.

On 26 January 2002, two people were mildly ill due to gas poisoning caused by an arson attack in an officer's bedroom. Arson set fire in the officer's bedroom on 13 March and officer's toilet on 17 May. On 6 October, a former torpedo chief was arrested after being accused of arson of existing buildings.

On 13 March 2003, Umigiri was transferred to the 8th Escort Corps of the 4th Escort Corps, and the fixed port became Kure, and she was transferred to the same area. On 17 March 2014, as the 18th dispatched anti-piracy action surface corps, sailed from Kure base to the Gulf of Aden off the coast of Somalia with the escort ship JS Inazuma, Umagiri engaged in missions until August of the same year. She returned to Japan on 20 August.

From 15 March to 28 May 2016, the destroyer participated in the Japan-Australia joint training conducted in the waters around Sydney with the escort ship JS Asayuki and the submarine JS Hakuryū.

At noon on 24 May 2018, the North Korean-registered tanker SAM JONG 2 was released on the high seas of the East China Sea (about 250 km, 160 mi east of Shanghai). She came in contact with a tanker with an unknown ship registration labeled Myeongryu 1 and confirmed that she was performing what appears to be "ship-to-ship", which is prohibited by a UN Security Council resolution. SAM JONG 2 is a vessel designated by the United Nations Security Council North Korea Sanctions Committee as a target of asset freeze and port entry ban in March 2018.

== Gallery ==
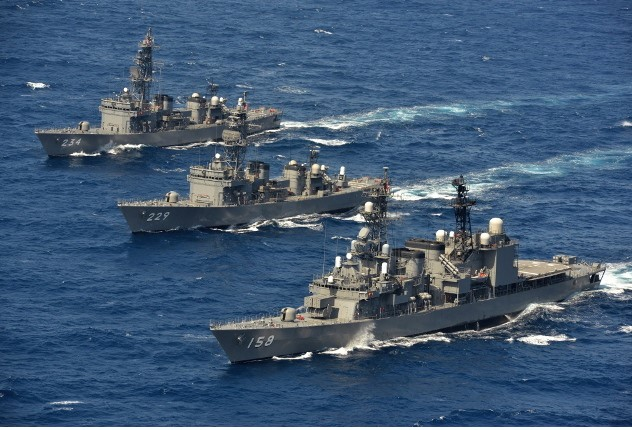
12th Escort Corps, JS Umigiri, JS Abukuma and JS Tone on 29 March 2018.

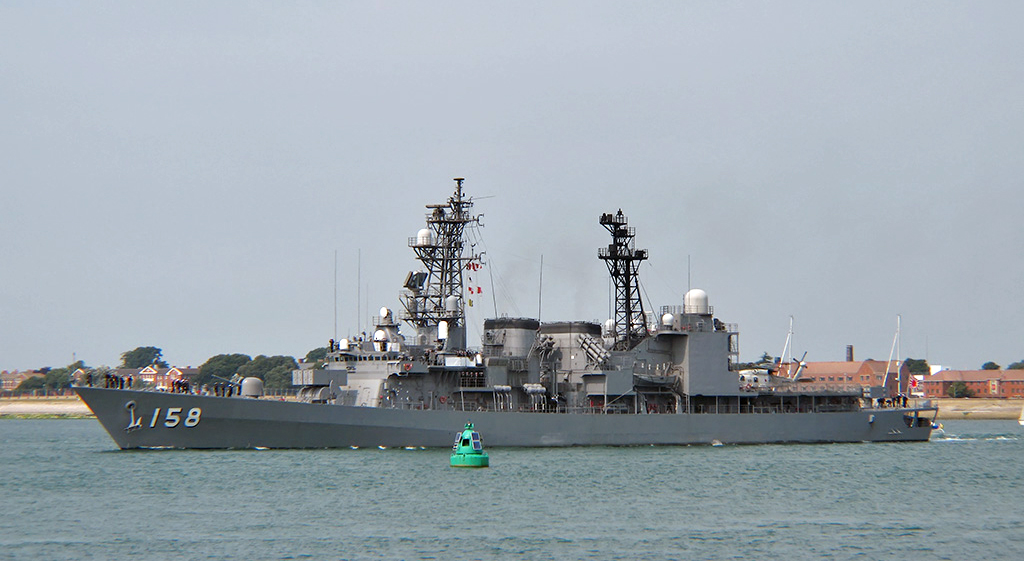
JS Umigiri on 28 July 2008.

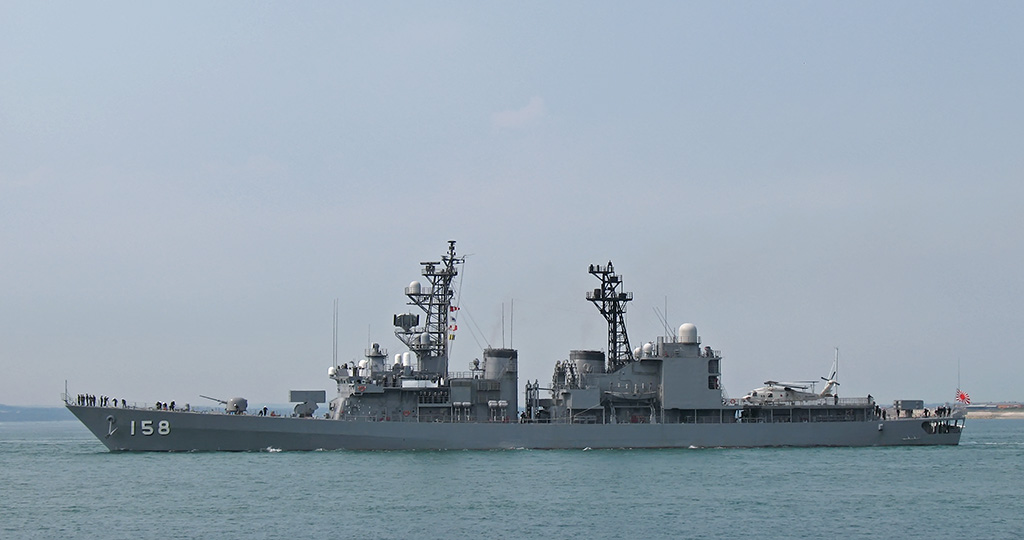
JS Umigiri on 28 July 2008.

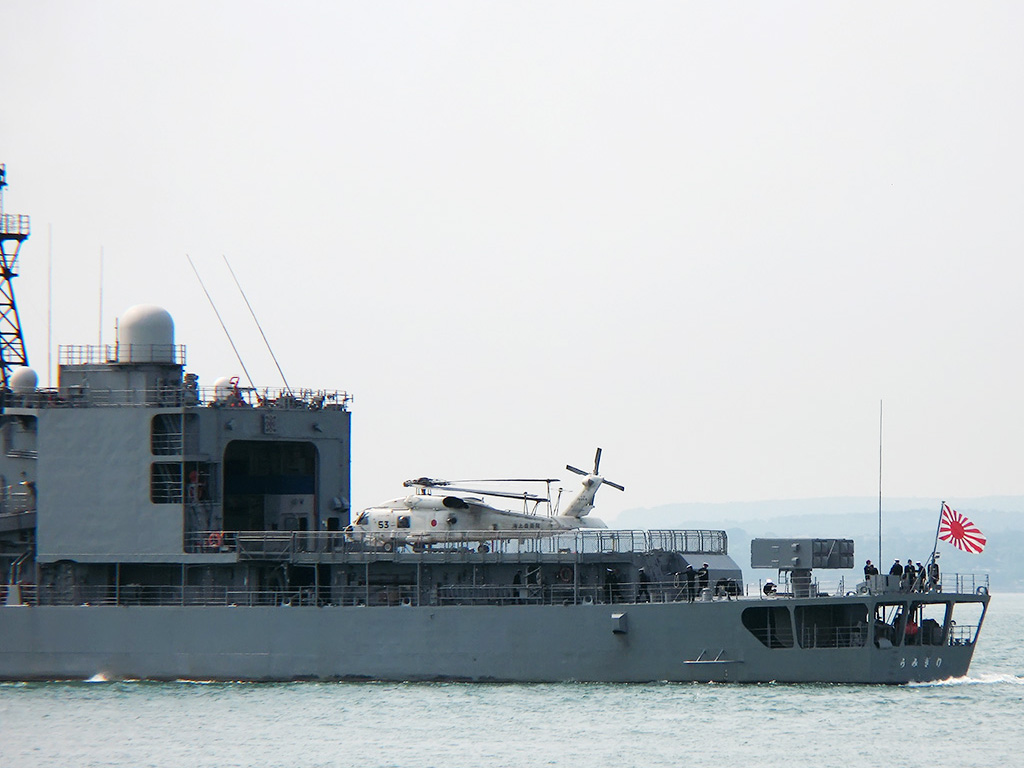
JS Umigiri on 28 July 2008.
