= USS LST-491 =

WWII US tank landing ship

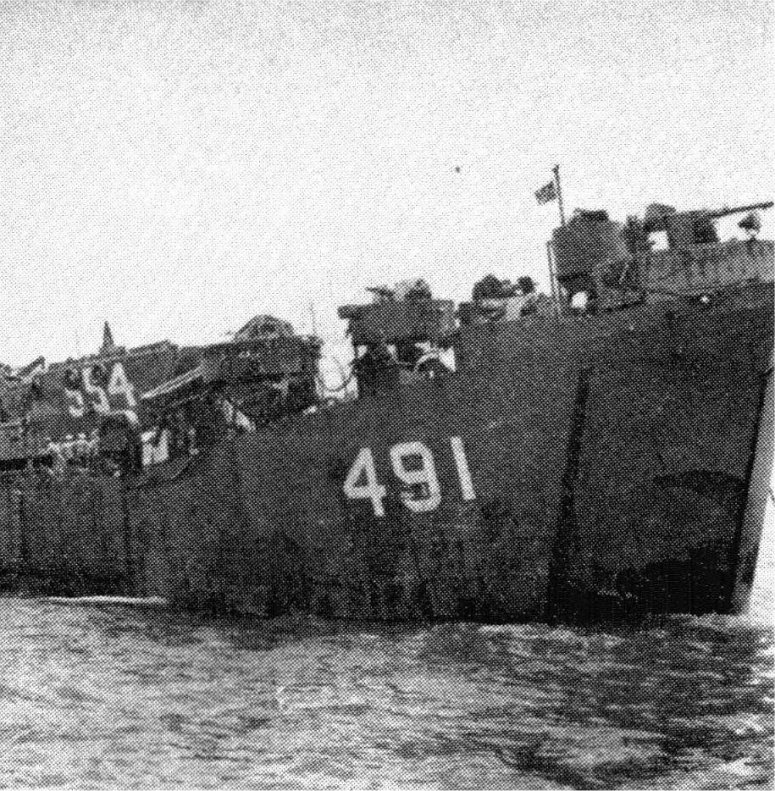
- LST-491 at Plymouth, England, with a calculated list in preparation for launching LCT-554, after completing the North Atlantic crossing

History

United States
- Name: LST-491
- Builder: Missouri Valley Bridge & Iron Company, Evansville, Indiana
- Laid down: 29 July 1943
- Launched: 23 September 1943
- Commissioned: 3 December 1943
- Decommissioned: 12 January 1946
- Stricken: 13 September 1976
- Identification: Hull symbol: LST-512; Code letters: NPAX
- Honors and awards: 3 × battle stars (WWII)
- Fate: Sold to the Philippines, 13 September 1976

Philippines
- Name: Lanao del Sur
- Namesake: The province of Lanao del Sur
- Commissioned: 13 September 1976
- Decommissioned: 1988
- Identification: LT-503
- Fate: Converted to commercial barge after 1988

General characteristics
- Class & type: LST-491-class tank landing ship
- Displacement: 1,625 long tons (1,651 t) (light); 4,080 long tons (4,145 t) (full (seagoing draft with 1,675 short tons (1,520 t) load); 2,366 long tons (2,404 t) (beaching)
- Length: 328 ft (100 m) oa
- Beam: 50 ft (15 m)
- Draft: Unloaded: 2 ft 4 in (0.71 m) forward; 7 ft 6 in (2.29 m) aft; Full load: 8 ft 3 in (2.51 m) forward; 14 ft 1 in (4.29 m) aft; Landing with 500 short tons (450 t) load: 3 ft 11 in (1.19 m) forward; 9 ft 10 in (3.00 m) aft
- Installed power: 2 × 900 hp (670 kW) Electro-Motive Diesel 12-567A diesel engines; 1,700 shp (1,300 kW)
- Propulsion: 1 × Falk main reduction gears; 2 × Propellers
- Speed: 12 kn (22 km/h; 14 mph)
- Range: 24,000 nmi (44,000 km; 28,000 mi) at 9 kn (17 km/h; 10 mph) while displacing 3,960 long tons (4,024 t)
- Boats & landing craft carried: 6 x LCVPs
- Capacity: 1,600–1,900 short tons (3,200,000–3,800,000 lb; 1,500,000–1,700,000 kg) cargo depending on mission
- Troops: 16 officers, 147 enlisted men
- Complement: 13 officers, 104 enlisted men
- Armament: Varied, ultimate armament; 2 × twin 40 mm (1.57 in) Bofors guns; 4 × single 40 mm Bofors guns; 12 × 20 mm (0.79 in) Oerlikon cannons

USS LST-491 was the lead ship of her class of tank landing ships built for the United States Navy during World War II. Like many of her class, she was not named and is properly referred to by her hull designation.

== Construction and commissioning ==
LST-491 was laid down on 29 July 1943, at Evansville, Indiana, by the Missouri Valley Bridge & Iron Company; launched on 23 September 1943; sponsored by Mrs. Barton Cook; and commissioned on 3 December 1943.

== Service history ==
During World War II, LST-491 was assigned to the European Theater and participated in the Invasion of Normandy in June 1944, and the invasion of southern France in August and September 1944. She was then assigned to the Asiatic-Pacific Theater and took part in the assault and occupation of Okinawa Gunto in May and June 1945.

Following the war, LST-491 performed occupation duty in the Far East until early January 1946. The tank landing ship returned to the United States and was decommissioned on 12 January 1946. She was loaned to the Japanese government on 31 March 1952, and operated under the Shipping Control Authority, Japan.

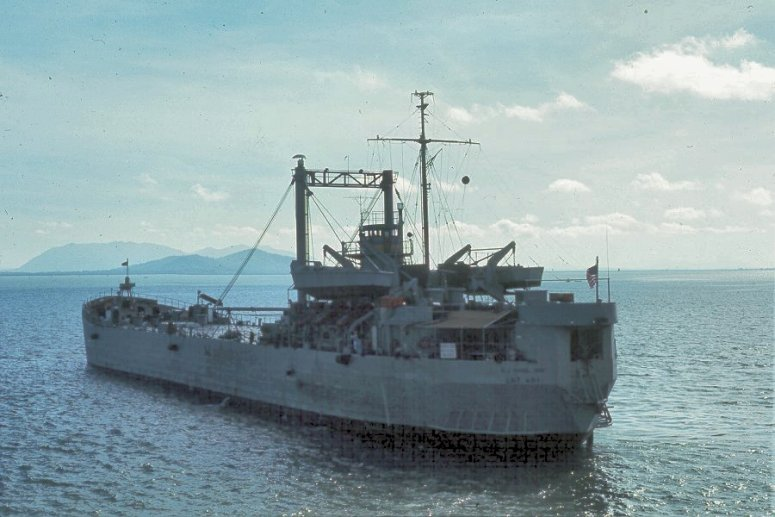
USNS T-LST-491 at anchor, date and place unknown.

The ship was later operated by Military Sea Transportation Service (MSTS), later the Military Sealift Command (MSC), Pacific and redesignated USNS T-LST-491.

The ship was struck from the Naval Vessel Register in June 1975 and transferred to the Philippine Navy on 13 September 1976. Her final fate is unknown.

LST-491 earned three battle stars for World War II service.

== Bibliography ==
- "USS LST-491". NavSource. 28 November 2014.
- "'LST-491'". Dictionary of American Naval Fighting Ships. Navy Department, Naval History and Heritage Command. 3 August 2015. This article incorporates text from this source, which is in the public domain.

== See also ==
- List of United States Navy LSTs
