= Third Division =

In sport, the Third Division, also called Division 3, Division Three, or Division III, is often the third-highest division of a league, and will often have promotion and relegation with divisions above and below.

== Association football ==
- Belgian Third Division, third-highest level in Belgian football
- Cypriot Third Division, third major league of Cyprus
- Danish 3rd Division, third level of the Danish football league system
- Egyptian Second Division B, third level of the Egyptian football league system
- Football League Third Division, third tier of English football from 1920 until 1992
- French Division 3 (disambiguation)
- Galway & District League Third Division, fourth tier of the Galway & District League football
- Hong Kong Third Division League, third level of football of the Hong Kong Football Association
- Liga Indonesia Third Division, lowest level of nationwide football competition in Indonesia
- Interdistrict Division Three, fifth tier of football in the Northern New South Wales Australia
- Iran Football's 3rd Division, fourth-highest division in the Iranian football system
- Kolmonen – Finnish League Division 3, fifth level in the league system of Finnish football
- Lebanese Third Division, third division of Lebanese football
- Libyan Third Division, third tier of Libyan football
- Maltese Third Division, lowest league level in Maltese football
- Norwegian Third Division, fourth-highest division of football in Norway
- Terceira Divisão, fourth level of the Portuguese football league system
- Russian Amateur Football League or III Division, fourth tier of the Russian football league system
- Scottish Football League Third Division, fourth-highest division in the Scottish football system
- Swedish Football Division 3, fifth level in the league system of Swedish football
- Swedish Women's Football Division 3, fourth level in the league system of Swedish women's football
- Victorian State League Division 3, fourth tier football competition in Victoria, Australia
- Welsh Football League Division Three, fourth level of the football league system in south Wales
- York Football League Division Three, fourth level in the York Football League system

== Other sports ==
- AIB Division Three, rugby union league in Ireland
- NCAA Division III, the third tier of intercollegiate sports in the United States
- FFHG Division 3, ice hockey, France
- IIHF World Championship Division III, lowest level of the International Ice Hockey Federation
- Kildare Senior Football League Division 3, Kildare Gaelic Athletic Association
- Leinster League Division Three, third division of the Leinster League
- National Conference League Division 3, fourth division in the British Amateur Rugby League
- North Division Three (shinty), fourth tier of the Shinty league system in Scotland
- Portuguese Handball Third Division, fourth handball league in Portugal
- Rugby Football League Championship Third Division, third level of Britain's Rugby Football League
- Scottish National League Division Three, one of Scotland's national rugby union league divisions
- Sligo Intermediate Football League Division 3 (ex Div. 2), Sligo Gaelic Athletic Association
- Speedway National League Division Three, third division of motorcycle speedway in the United Kingdom
- WRU Division Three East, a rugby union league in Wales
- WRU Division Three North, a rugby union league in Wales
- WRU Division Three South East, a rugby union league in Wales
- WRU Division Three South West, a rugby union league in Wales
- WRU Division Three West, a rugby union league in Wales

== See also ==
- 3rd Division (disambiguation), for usage of the term in the military
- (various places in Canada)
- DIII (disambiguation)
