= 503rd =

503rd or 503d may refer to:

- 503d Air Defense Group, inactive United States Air Force organization
- 503d Aircraft Control and Warning Group (AC&WG), inactive United States Air Force unit
- 503d Aircraft Control Group, inactive United States Air Force unit
- 503d Fighter Squadron, unit of the New York Air National Guard that flies the C-130 Hercules
- 503rd Heavy Panzer Battalion, German heavy Panzer Abteilung equipped with Tiger I tanks and Panzer IIIs during World War II
- 503rd Infantry Regiment (United States), an airborne forces regiment of the US Army
- 503rd SS Heavy Panzer Battalion or 103rd SS Heavy Panzer Battalion, originally formed as the II.Battalion, 11 SS Panzer Regiment

== See also ==
- No. 503 Squadron RAF, an Interwar British Royal Air Force bomber unit
- 503 Field Battery, Royal Artillery, British Army
- 503 (disambiguation), including ships with pennant no.503
