= JS Hakuryū =

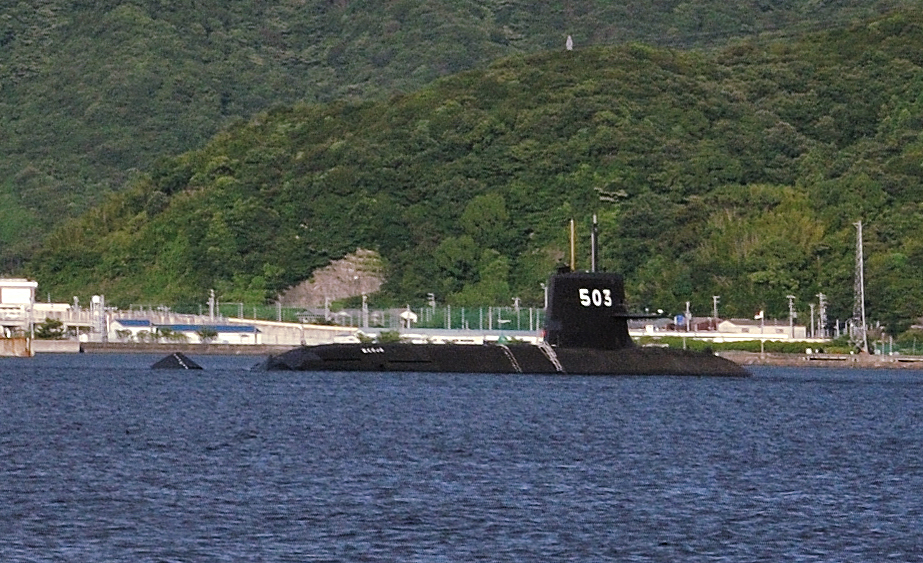
- JS Hakuryū on 4 August 2010

History

Japan
- Name: Hakuryū; (はくりゅう)
- Namesake: Hakuryū
- Ordered: 2006
- Builder: Mitsubishi Heavy Industries
- Cost: ¥64.3 billion
- Laid down: 6 February 2007
- Launched: 16 October 2009
- Commissioned: 14 March 2011
- Home port: Kure
- Identification: SS-503
- Status: Active

General characteristics
- Class & type: Sōryū-class attack submarine
- Displacement: Surfaced: 2,900 tonnes (2,854 long tons); Submerged: 4,200 t (4,134 long tons)
- Length: 84.0 m (275 ft 7 in)
- Beam: 9.1 m (29 ft 10 in)
- Draught: 8.5 m (27 ft 11 in)
- Propulsion: 1-shaft 2× Kawasaki 12V 25/25 SB-type diesel engines diesel-electric; 4× Kawasaki Kockums V4-275R Stirling engines; 3,900 hp (2,900 kW) surfaced; 8,000 hp (6,000 kW) submerged
- Speed: Surfaced: 13 kn (24 km/h; 15 mph); Submerged: 20 kn (37 km/h; 23 mph)
- Range: AIP endurance (est.): 6,100 nautical miles (11,300 km; 7,000 mi) at 6.5 knots (12.0 km/h; 7.5 mph)
- Complement: 65 (9 officers, 56 enlisted)
- Sensors & processing systems: ZPS-6F surface/low-level air search radar; Hughes/Oki ZQQ-7 Sonar suite: 1× bow-array, 4× LF flank arrays and 1× Towed array sonar
- Electronic warfare & decoys: ZLR-3-6 ESM equipment; 2× 3-inch underwater countermeasure launcher tubes for launching of Acoustic Device Countermeasures (ADCs)
- Armament: 6 × HU-606 21 in (533 mm) torpedo tubes with 30 reloads for: 1.) Type 89 torpedo; 2.) Harpoon (missile); Mines

JS Hakuryū (SS-503) is the third boat of the Sōryū-class submarines, operated by the Japan Maritime Self-Defense Force. She was commissioned on 14 March 2011.

== Construction and career ==
Hakuryū was laid down at Mitsubishi Heavy Industries Kobe Shipyard on 6 February 2007 as the 2006 plan 2900-ton submarine No. 8118 based on the medium-term defense capability development plan. At the launching ceremony, the vessel was named Hakuryū and launched on 16 October 2009. The submarine was commissioned on 14 March 2011 and deployed to Kure. Hakuryū belongs to the 5th Submarine Corps, and its homeport is Kure.

On 15 January 2013, she left Kure for training in the United States in Pearl Harbor. Hakuryū returned to Kure on 9 May. The submarine departed Yokosuka for training in the United States on 6 February 2015 and entered Pearl Harbor on 26 February. After calling at Guam, she returned to Kure on 9 May.

From 15 March to 28 May 2016, she participated in joint training with Australia in the waters near Sydney with the escort vessels JS Asayuki and JS Umigiri. Joint training was conducted with the Royal Australian Navy and Air Force, the amphibious assault ship HMAS Adelaide, the frigate HMAS Ballarat and the supply ship HMAS Success.

From 16 January to 14 April 2018, Hakuryū participated in US dispatch training and conducted offshore training and facility use training in the Hawaiian Islands area.

== Gallery ==
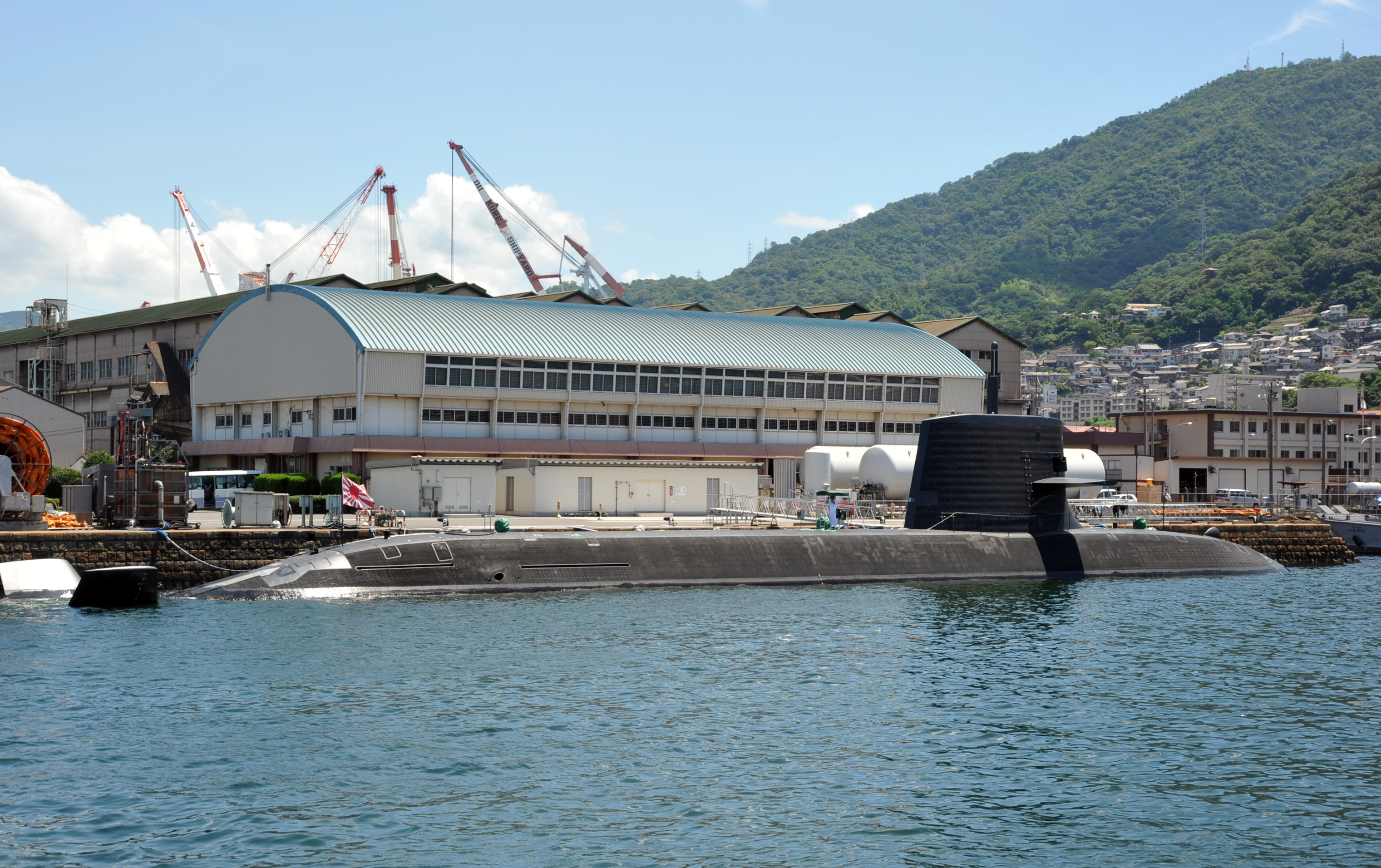
JS Hakuryū, date unknown.

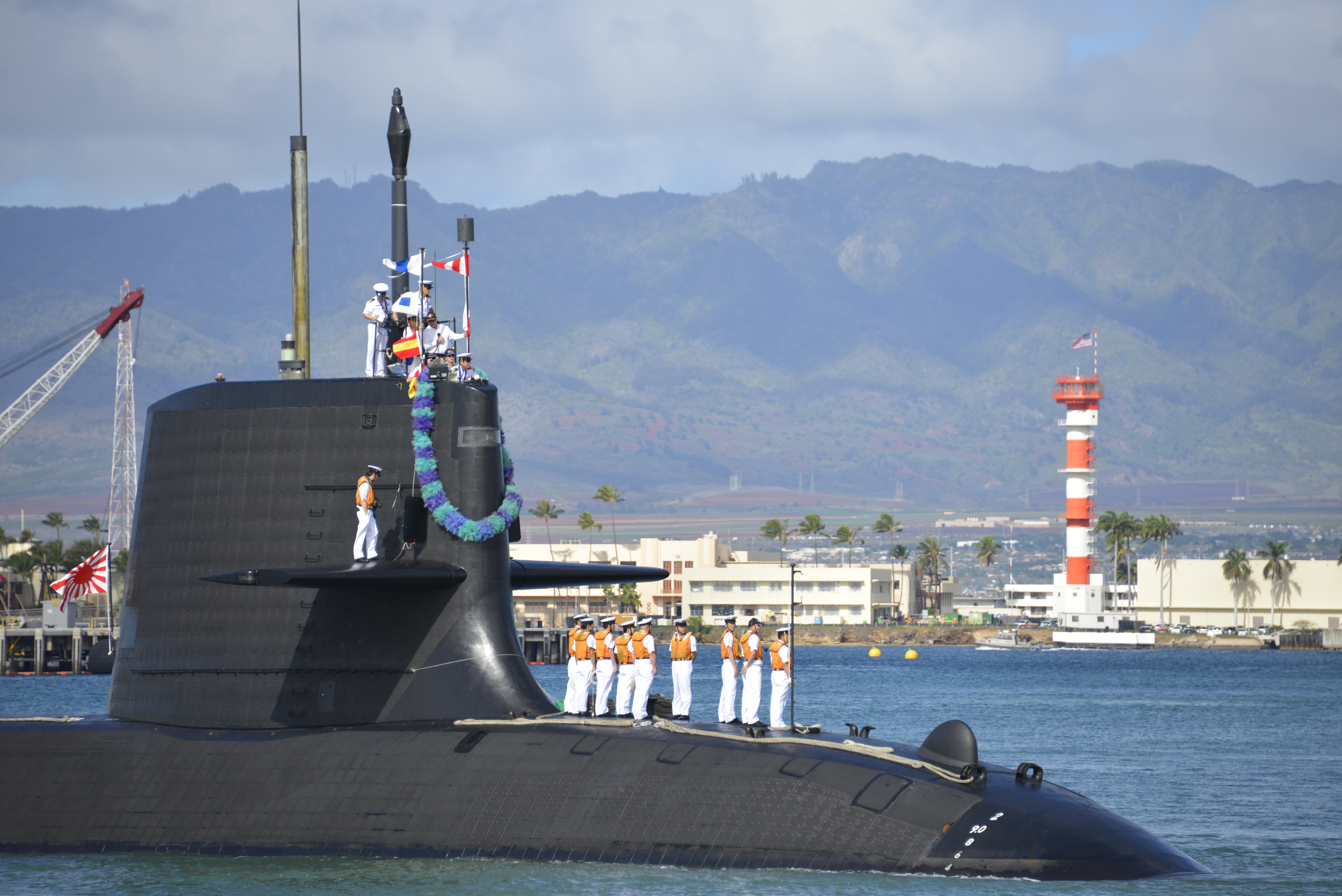
JS Hakuryū arriving at Pearl Harbor on 6 February 2013.

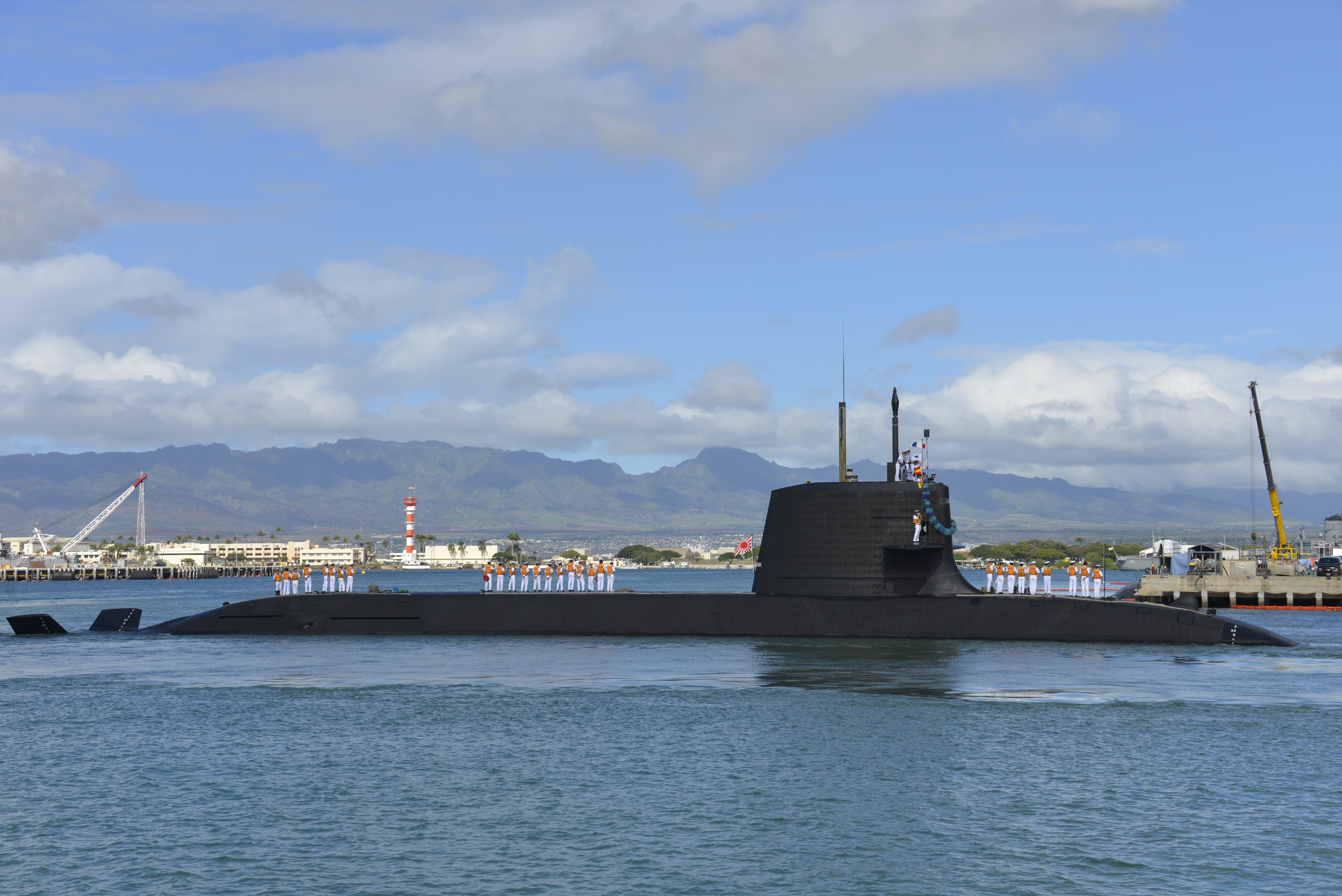
JS Hakuryū arriving at Pearl Harbor on 6 February 2013.

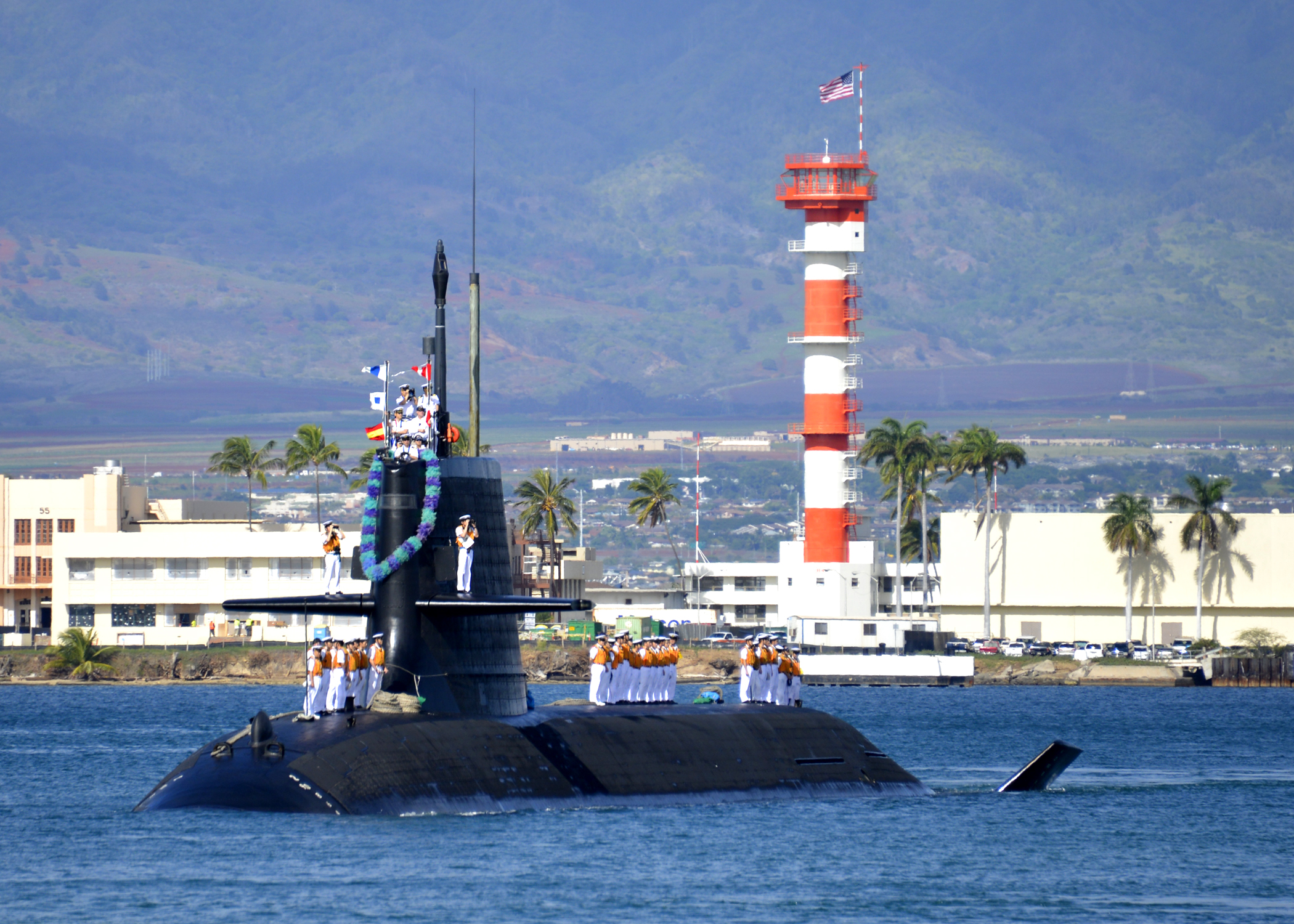
JS Hakuryū arriving at Pearl Harbor on 6 February 2013.

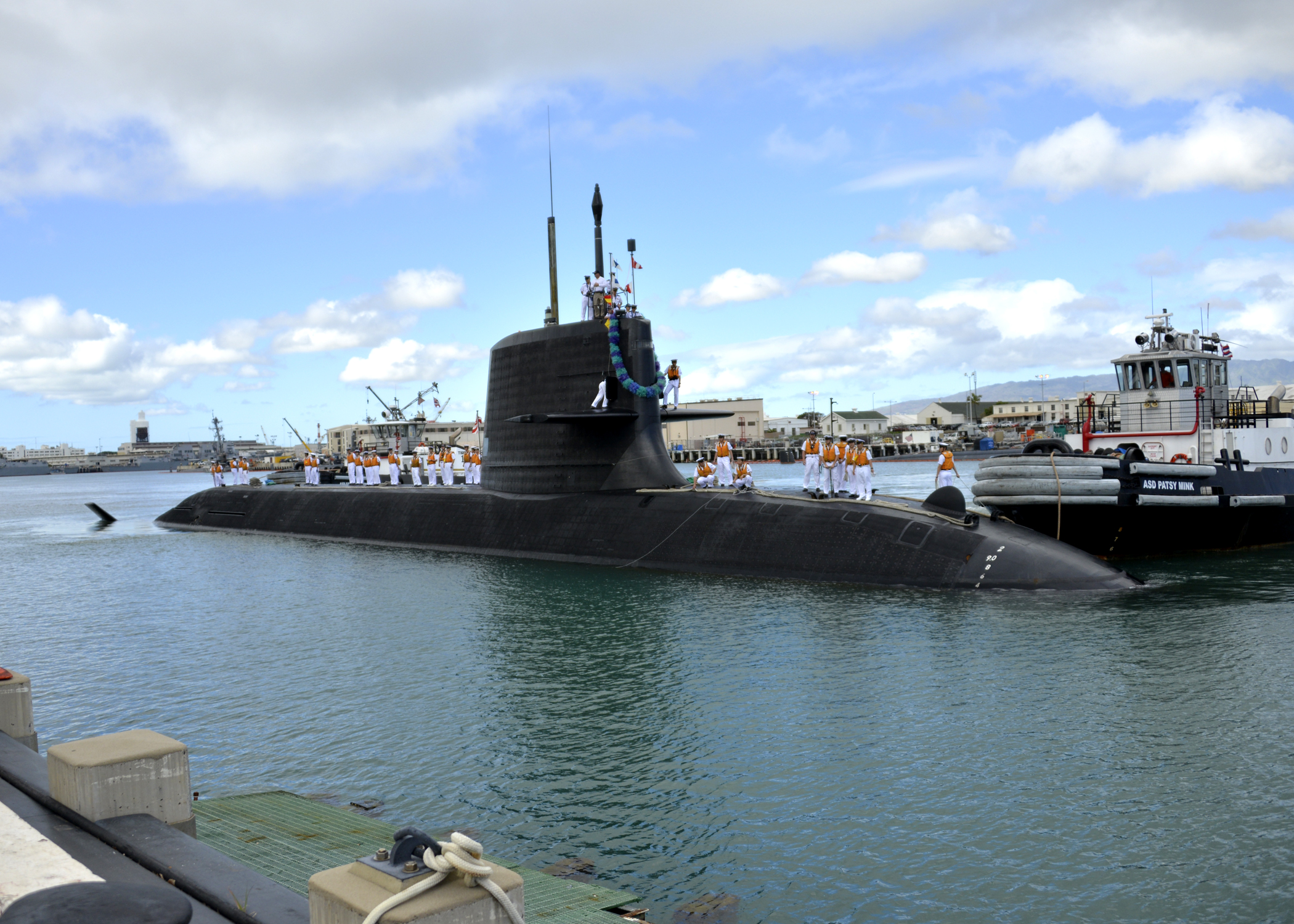
JS Hakuryū arriving at Pearl Harbor on 6 February 2013.

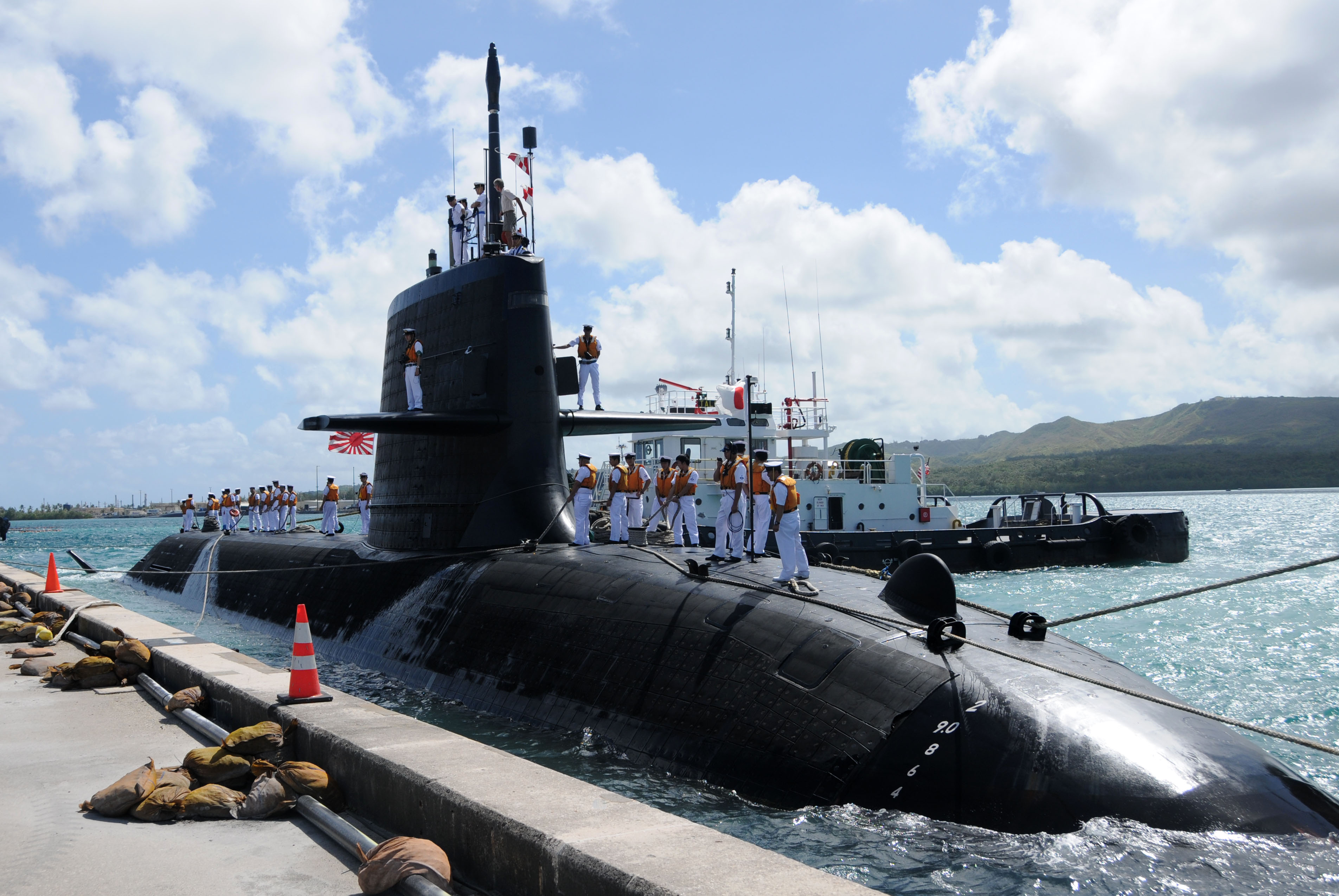
JS Hakuryū at Guam on 12 April 2013.
