= 503 =

Calendar year

503 in various calendars
- Gregorian calendar: 503; DIII
- Ab urbe condita: 1256
- Assyrian calendar: 5253
- Balinese saka calendar: 424–425
- Bengali calendar: −91 – −90
- Berber calendar: 1453
- Buddhist calendar: 1047
- Burmese calendar: −135
- Byzantine calendar: 6011–6012
- Chinese calendar: 壬午年 (Water Horse); 3200 or 2993 — to — 癸未年 (Water Goat); 3201 or 2994
- Coptic calendar: 219–220
- Discordian calendar: 1669
- Ethiopian calendar: 495–496
- Hebrew calendar: 4263–4264
- Hindu calendars
- Vikram Samvat: 559–560
- Shaka Samvat: 424–425
- Kali Yuga: 3603–3604
- Holocene calendar: 10503
- Iranian calendar: 119 BP – 118 BP
- Islamic calendar: 123 BH – 122 BH
- Javanese calendar: 389–390
- Julian calendar: 503; DIII
- Korean calendar: 2836
- Minguo calendar: 1409 before ROC 民前1409年
- Nanakshahi calendar: −965
- Seleucid era: 814/815 AG
- Thai solar calendar: 1045–1046
- Tibetan calendar: ཆུ་ཕོ་རྟ་ལོ་ (male Water-Horse); 629 or 248 or −524 — to — ཆུ་མོ་ལུག་ལོ་ (female Water-Sheep); 630 or 249 or −523

Year 503 (DIII) was a common year starting on Wednesday of the Julian calendar. At the time, it was known as the Year of the Consulship of Volusianus and Dexicrates (or, less frequently, year 1256 Ab urbe condita). The denomination 503 for this year has been used since the early medieval period, when the Anno Domini calendar era became the prevalent method in Europe for naming years.

== Events ==
=== Byzantine Empire ===
- War with Sassanid Persia: Emperor Anastasius I sends a Byzantine army (52,000 men) to Armenia, but is defeated. The Romans attempt an unsuccessful siege of the Persian-held city Amida, on the Tigris. King Kavadh I invades Osroene, and lays siege to the city of Edessa (Northern Mesopotamia).
- May – Areobindus, Byzantine general (magister militum), is stationed as commander at Dara, with an army of 12,000 men to keep watch at the Persian stronghold of Nisibis (modern Turkey).

=== Palestine ===
- Mundhir III, king of the Lakhmids (Arab Christians), raids Palaestina Salutaris and Arabia Petraea. He captures a large number of Romans.

=== Europe ===
- King Ernakh, third son of Attila the Hun, dies after a 34-year reign. He is succeeded by his two sons (Utigur and Kutrigur), who share the power with the unified Bulgars.

== Births ==
- October 17 – Lý Nam Đế, first emperor of Vietnam (d. 548)
- December 2 – Xiao Gang, later Emperor Jianwen of Liang, emperor of the Chinese Liang dynasty (killed 551)
- Chen Baxian, later Emperor Wu of Chen, first emperor of the Chinese Chen dynasty (d. 559)

== Deaths ==
- Ernakh, king of the Huns
