= Japanese ship Ōyodo =

At least two warships of Japan have borne the name Ōyodo:

- Japanese cruiser Ōyodo, was an Ōyodo-class cruiser launched in 1942 and sunk in 1945
- JS Ōyodo, is an Abukuma-class destroyer escort launched in 1989
