= Japanese ship Sendai =

At least two warships of Japan have borne the name Sendai:

- Japanese cruiser Sendai, was a Sendai-class cruiser launched in 1923 and sunk in 1943
- JS Sendai, is an Abukuma-class destroyer escort launched in 1990
