= JS Tone =

Abukuma-class destroyer escort

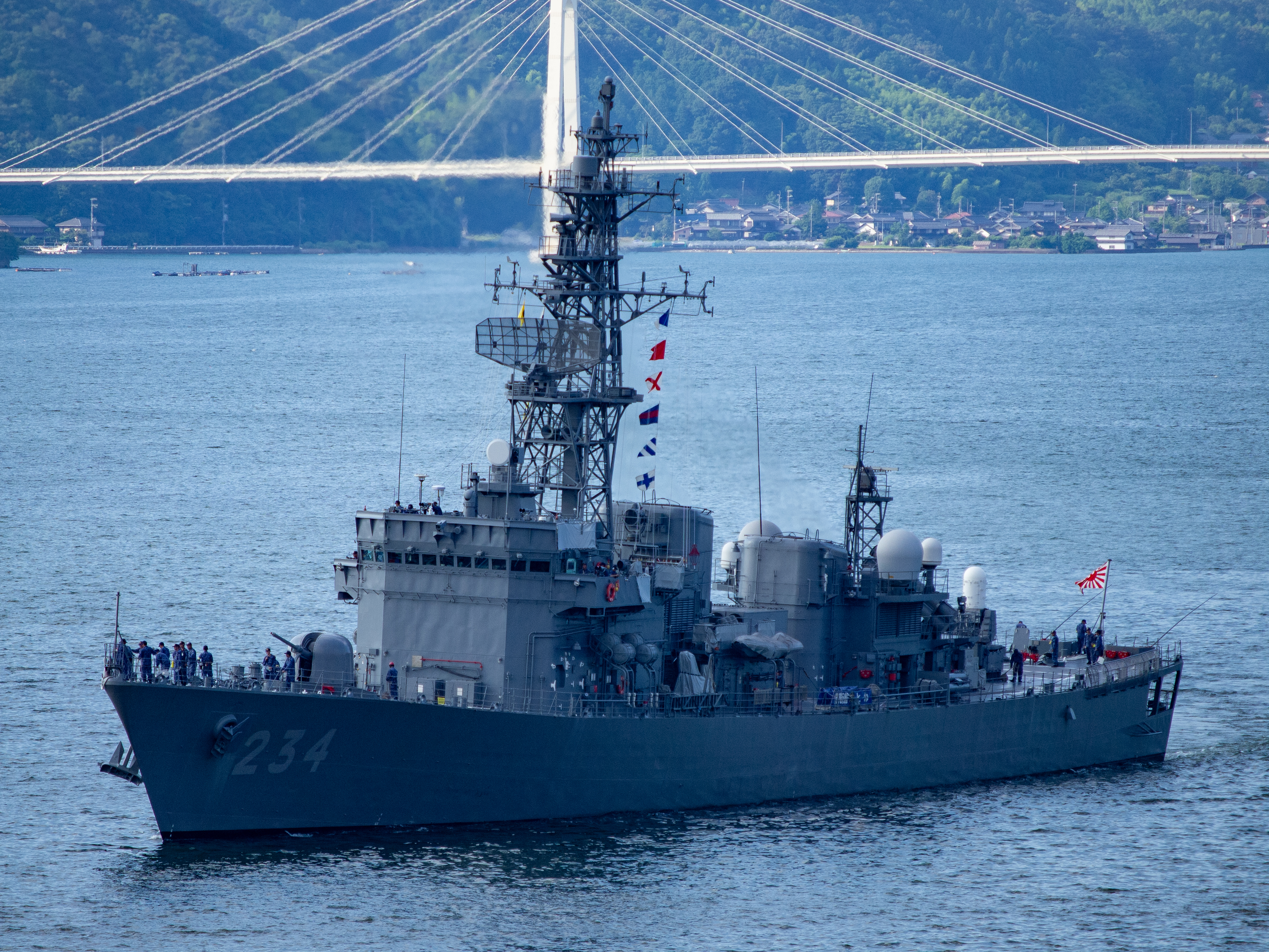
- JS Tone

History

Japan
- Name: Tone; (とね)
- Namesake: Tone (1937)
- Ordered: 1989
- Builder: Sumitomo, Tokyo
- Laid down: 8 February 1991
- Launched: 6 December 1991
- Commissioned: 8 February 1993
- Home port: Sasebo
- Identification: MMSI number: 431999576; Pennant number: DE-234
- Status: Active

General characteristics
- Class & type: Abukuma-class destroyer escort
- Displacement: 2,000 tons standard; 2,550 tons full load
- Length: 357 ft (109 m)
- Beam: 44 ft (13 m)
- Draft: 12 ft (3.7 m)
- Propulsion: CODOG, two shafts; 2 × Kawasaki-RR SM1A gas turbines26,650 hp (19,870 kW); 2 × Mitsubishi S12U MTK diesels 6,000 hp (4,500 kW)
- Speed: 27 knots (50 km/h; 31 mph)
- Complement: 120
- Sensors & processing systems: FCS-2
- Armament: 8 × Harpoon missiles; ASROC octuple launcher; 1 × Otobreda 76 mm gun; 1 × Phalanx 20 mm CIWS; 2 × HOS-301 triple 324 mm (12.8 in) torpedo tubes

JS Tone (DE-234) is the sixth ship of the Abukuma-class destroyer escorts. She was commissioned on 8 February 1993.

== Construction and career ==
Tone was laid down at Sumitomo Heavy Industries, Tokyo Shipyard on 8 February 1991 and launched on 6 December 1991. She was commissioned on 8 February 1993 and deployed to Sasebo.

From 2–4 August 1999, Tone visited Busan, South Korea with the escort vessels JS Shirane and JS Setoyuki, and she conducted the first Japan-Korea joint training in the East China Sea from the 4–5 August.

It was planned for the destroyer escort to be open to the public at Shibushi Port, along with the escort vessels JS Sendai, JS Sawakaze, and the transport vessel JS Ōsumi at the Kanoya Air Festival held from 19 to 20 May 2001, but near Fukuejima, a Chinese Navy ice-breaking information gathering ship was sailing offshore, so the activity was canceled so that the ships could track and monitor the Chinese vessel. After leaving Sasebo on 2 October 2001, she engaged in warning and surveillance activities with the US Navy amphibious assault ship USS Essex.

Around 5:30 PM on 16 February 2016, the Chinese Navy's East Sea Fleet sailed 85 kilometres (53 mi) East-Northeast of Taneshima from the Pacific Ocean to the East China Sea. The frigate Yantai, spy ship Tianlangxing, and supply ship Honghu were discovered together by P-3C aircraft belonging to the 5th Air Group and the support ship JS Genkai. After that, four ships were spotted heading West through the Ōsumi Strait. On 25 December, the Joint Staff Office of the Ministry of Defense announced that Tone was in the waters of the Central East China Sea at around 4 PM on the 24th of December, with the Chinese Navy aircraft carrier Liaoning, three missile destroyers, three frigate ships, and one supply ship, visually confirming the aircraft carrier's presence. This is the first time that the Japanese Maritime Self-Defense Force had visually confirmed the aircraft carrier of the Chinese Navy.

== Gallery ==
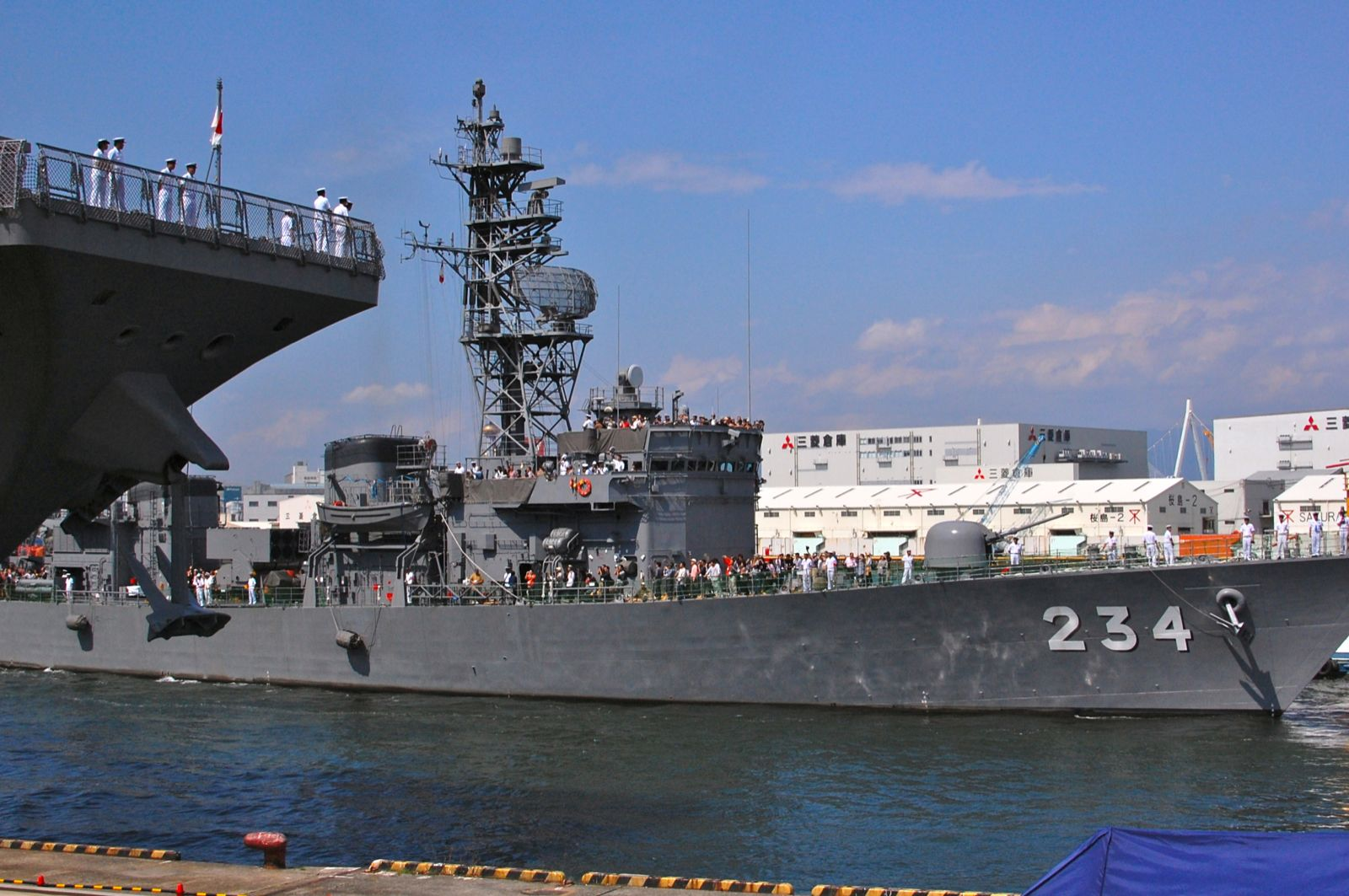
JS Tone departing Osaka on 25 September 2011.

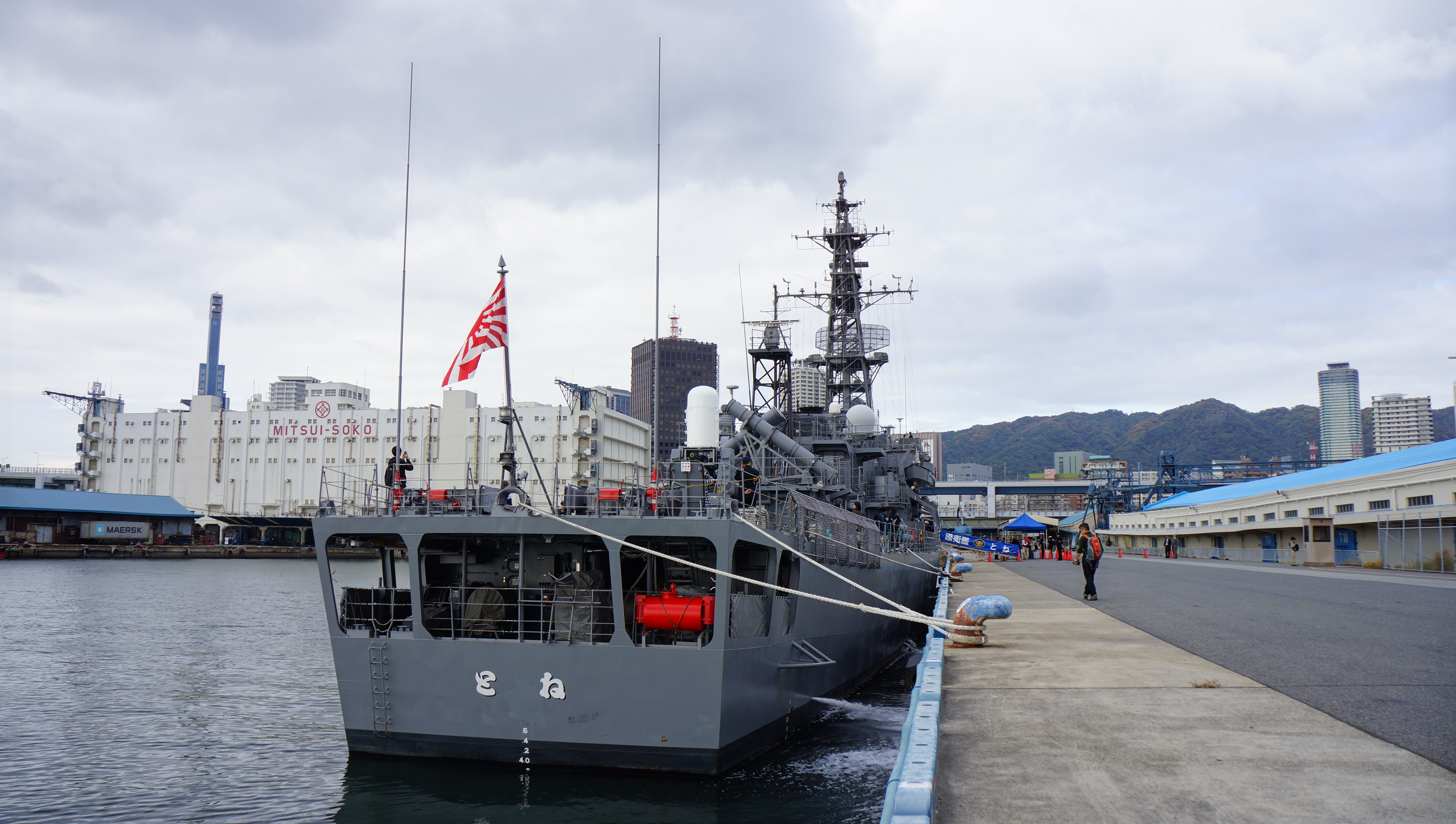
JS Tone at Kobe on 10 November 2012.

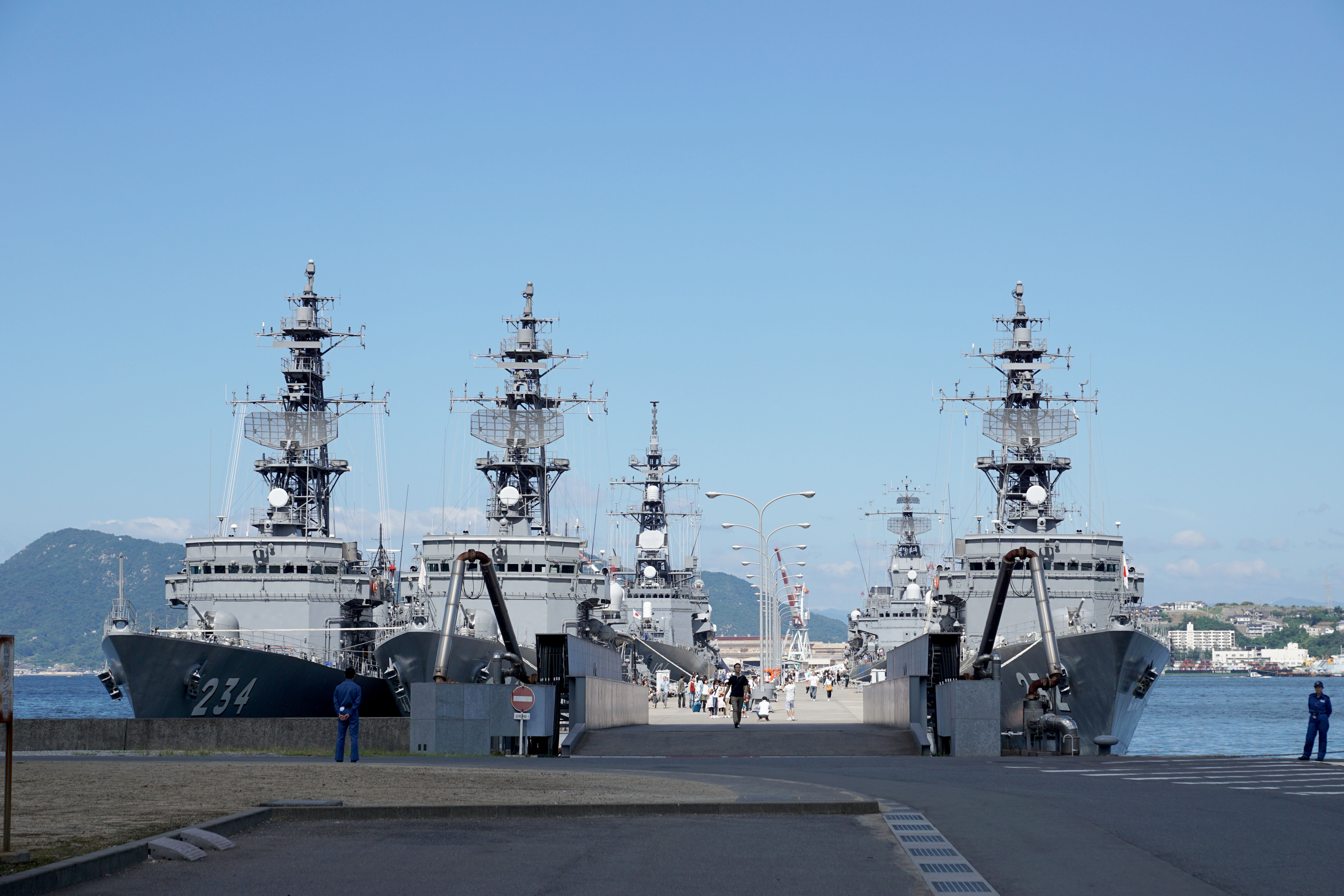
JS Tone, JS Abukuma, JS Sendai, JS Samidare and JS Kurobe at Kure on 20 September 2015.
