= JS Ōyodo =

Abukuma-class destroyer escort

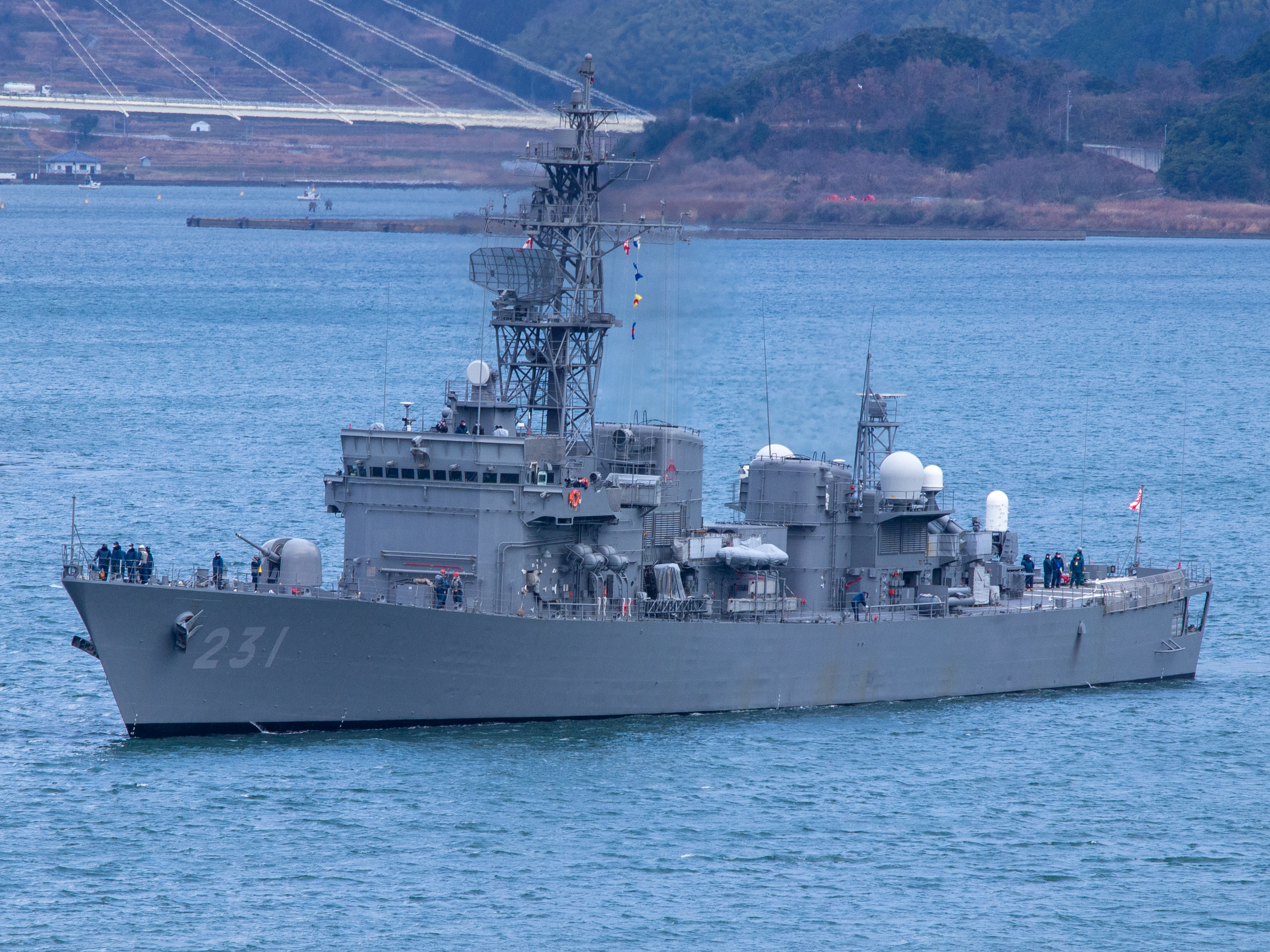
- JS Ōyodo

History

Japan
- Name: Ōyodo; (おおよど)
- Namesake: Ōyodo (1942)
- Ordered: 1987
- Builder: Hitachi, Osaka
- Laid down: 8 March 1989
- Launched: 19 December 1989
- Commissioned: 23 January 1991
- Home port: Ominato
- Identification: MMSI number: 431999507; Pennant number: DE-231
- Status: Active

General characteristics
- Class & type: Abukuma-class destroyer escort
- Displacement: 2,000 tons standard; 2,550 tons full load
- Length: 357 ft (109 m)
- Beam: 44 ft (13 m)
- Draft: 12 ft (3.7 m)
- Propulsion: CODOG, two shafts; 2 × Kawasaki-RR SM1A gas turbines26,650 hp (19,870 kW); 2 × Mitsubishi S12U MTK diesels 6,000 hp (4,500 kW)
- Speed: 27 knots (50 km/h; 31 mph)
- Complement: 120
- Sensors & processing systems: FCS-2
- Armament: 8 × Harpoon missiles; ASROC octuple launcher; 1 × Otobreda 76 mm gun; 1 × Phalanx 20 mm CIWS; 2 × HOS-301 triple 324 mm (12.8 in) torpedo tubes

JS Ōyodo (DE-231) is the third ship of the Abukuma-class destroyer escorts. She was commissioned on 23 January 1991.

== Construction and career ==
Ōyodo was laid down at Hitachi Zosen Corporation Osaka Shipyard on 8 March 1989 and launched on 19 December 1989. She was commissioned on 23 January 1991 and deployed to Sasebo.

On 20 June 1991, the 39th Escort Corps was newly formed under the Sasebo District Force and was incorporated with JS Sendai.

On 24 March 1997, the 39th escort corps was renamed to the 26th escort corps due to the revision of the corps number.

On 14 January 1999, the oil tanker Yoshimaru collided with the central port side of the ship at 11:11 am while moored at the Kurashima quay, causing an incident that caused a break.

In response to the 2011 Great East Japan Earthquake off the Pacific coast of Yokosuka caused by Tōhoku Earthquake, Ōyodo departed urgently to dispatch a disaster. On 16 March 2011, the 16th Escort Corps was abolished and transferred to the 15th Escort Corps, and the fixed port became Ōminato and transferred to the same area.

Departed on 21 September 2012 to participate in the Japan-Russia search and rescue joint training conducted in Vladivostok Port and the surrounding waters, entered Vladivostok Port on 23 September, and trained with the escort ship JS Ariake on 26 September and returned to the port on 28 September.

On the morning of 20 March 2019, the high seas of the East China Sea (about 410 km, 250 mi south of Shanghai), North Korean-registered tankers Yu Son and Qinhuangdao confirmed that a small vessel with an unknown flag, which was labeled as Qinhuangdao City, North Korea, was performing what appeared to be a ship-to-ship transfer banned by a UN Security Council resolution. Yu Son is a vessel designated by the United Nations Security Council North Korea Sanctions Committee as a target of asset freezing and port entry bans in March 2018. The supply ship JS Tokiwa belonging to the 1st Maritime Supply Corps of the Maritime Self-Defense Force confirmed that it was there.

== Gallery ==
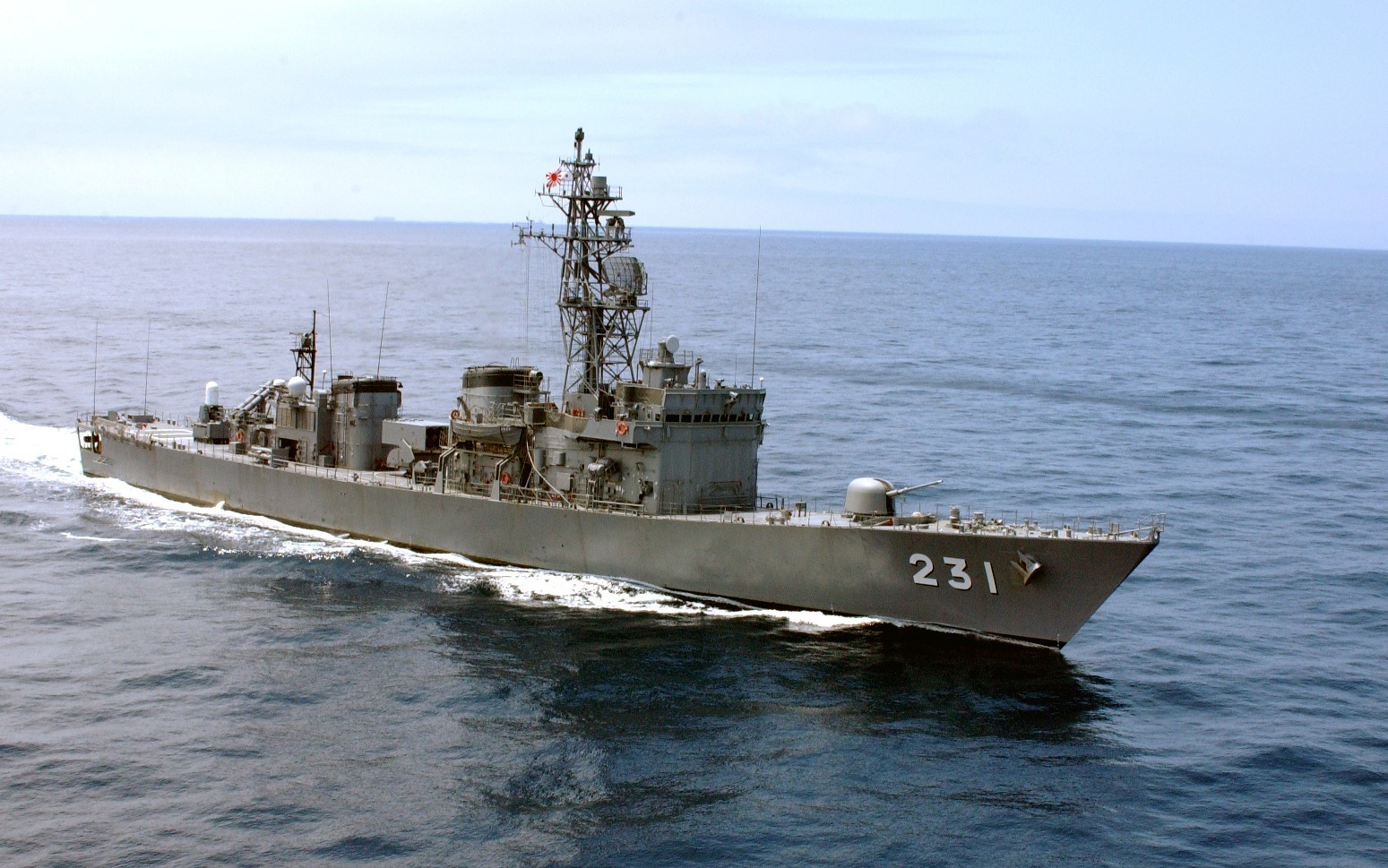

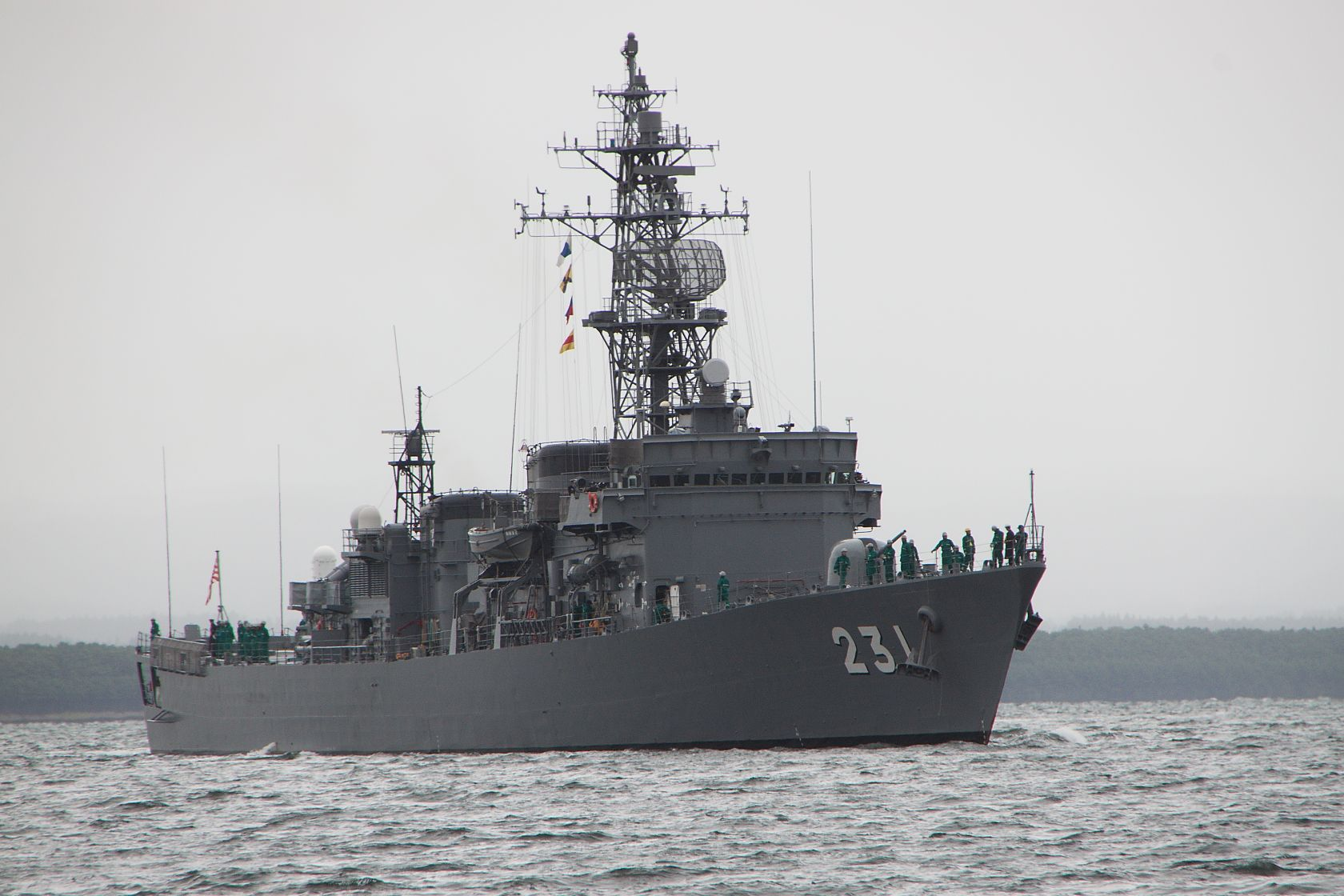
JS Ōyodo on 28 September 2012.

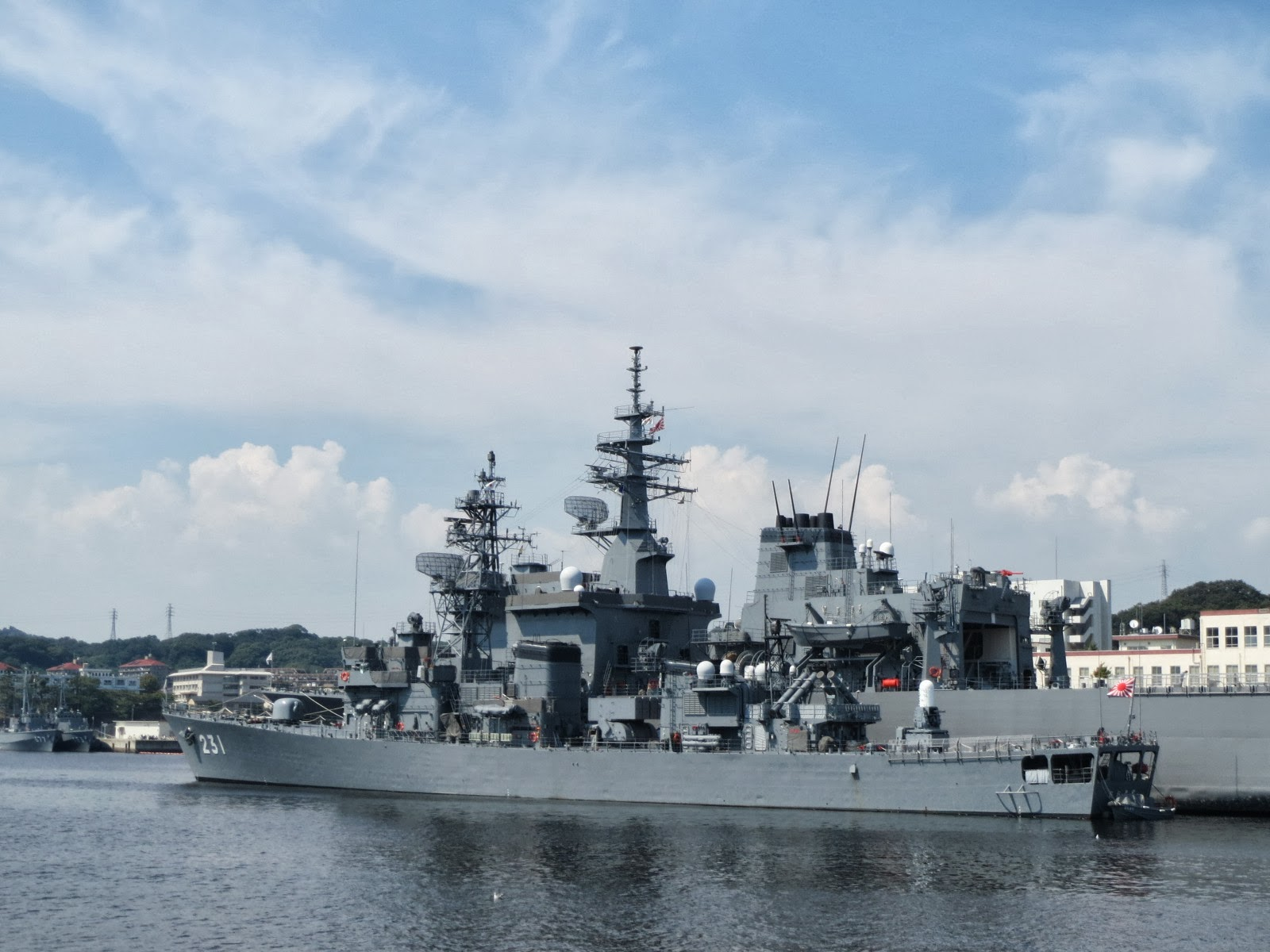
JS Ōyodo and JS Uraga at Yokosuka on 22 September 2013.

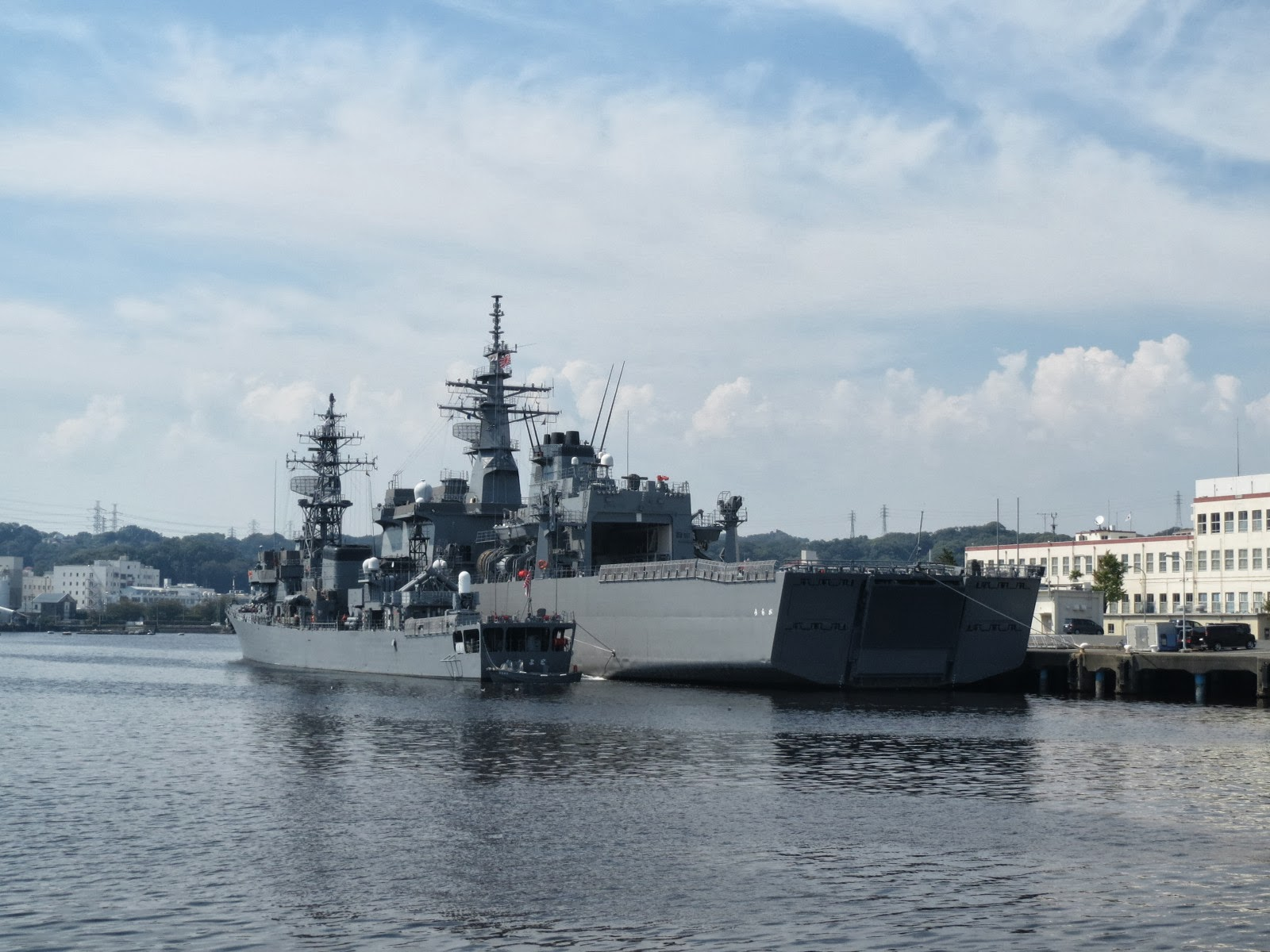
JS Ōyodo and JS Uraga at Yokosuka on 22 September 2013.

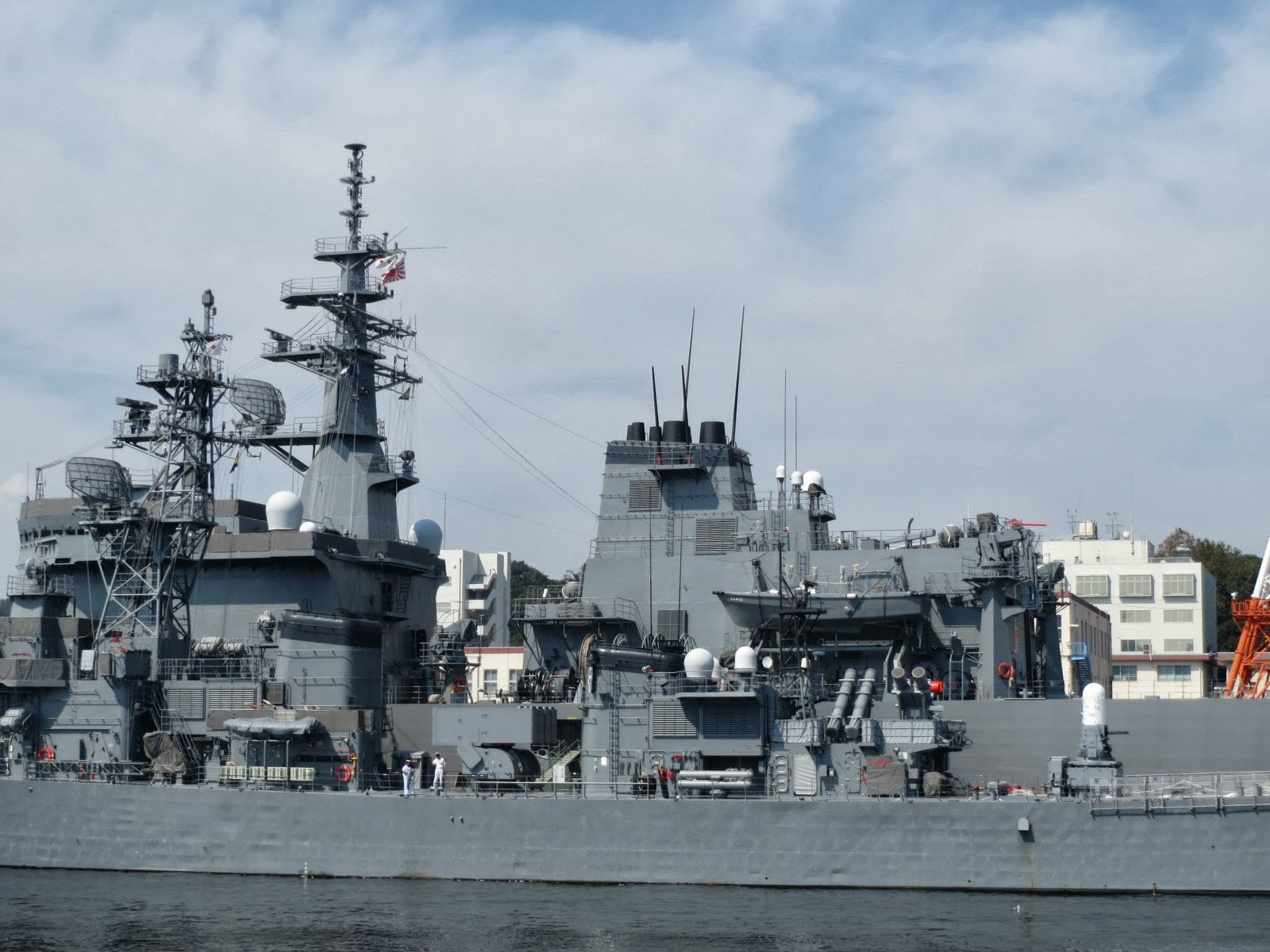
JS Ōyodo and JS Uraga at Yokosuka on 22 September 2013.

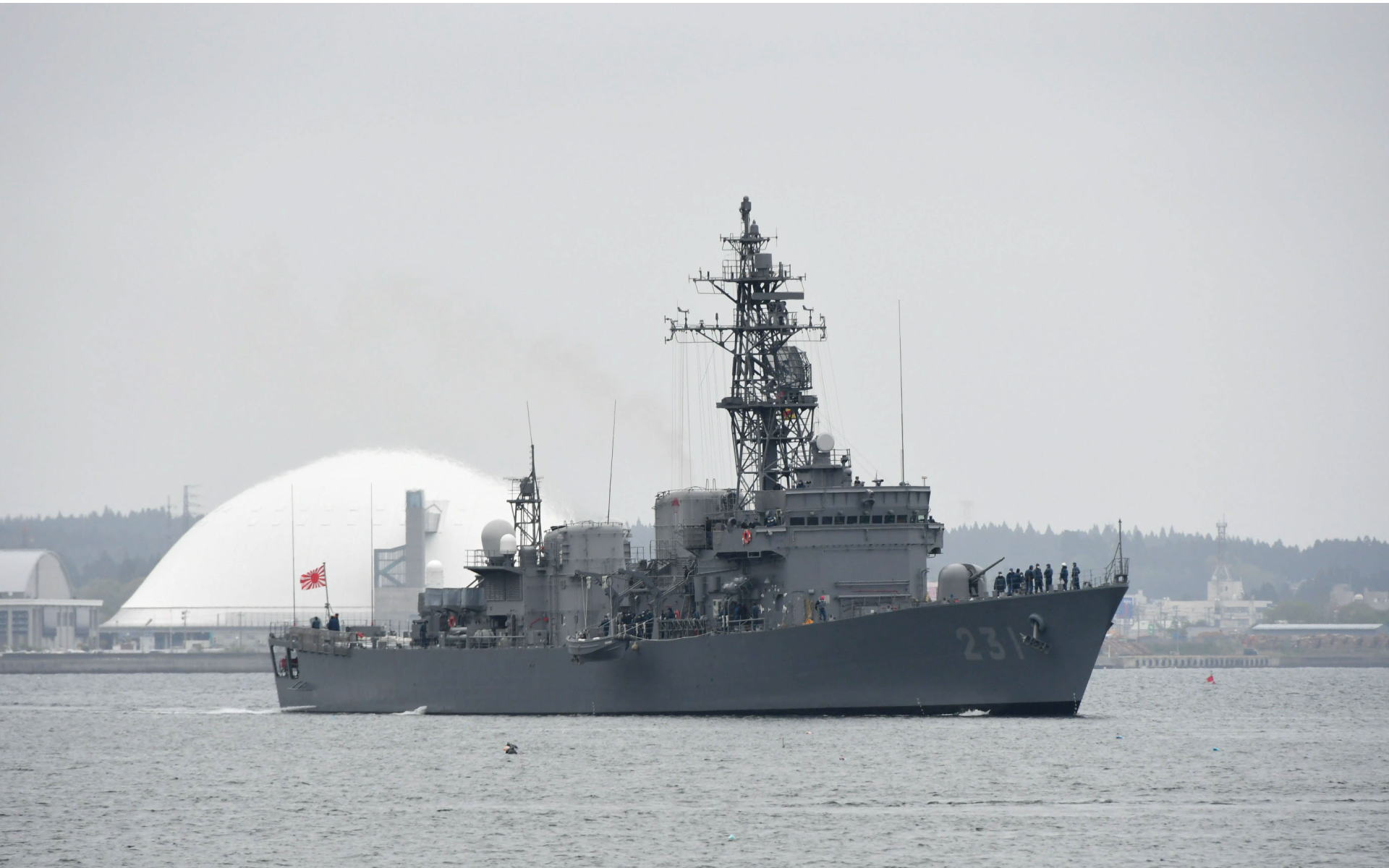
JS Ōyodo on 25 May 2020.

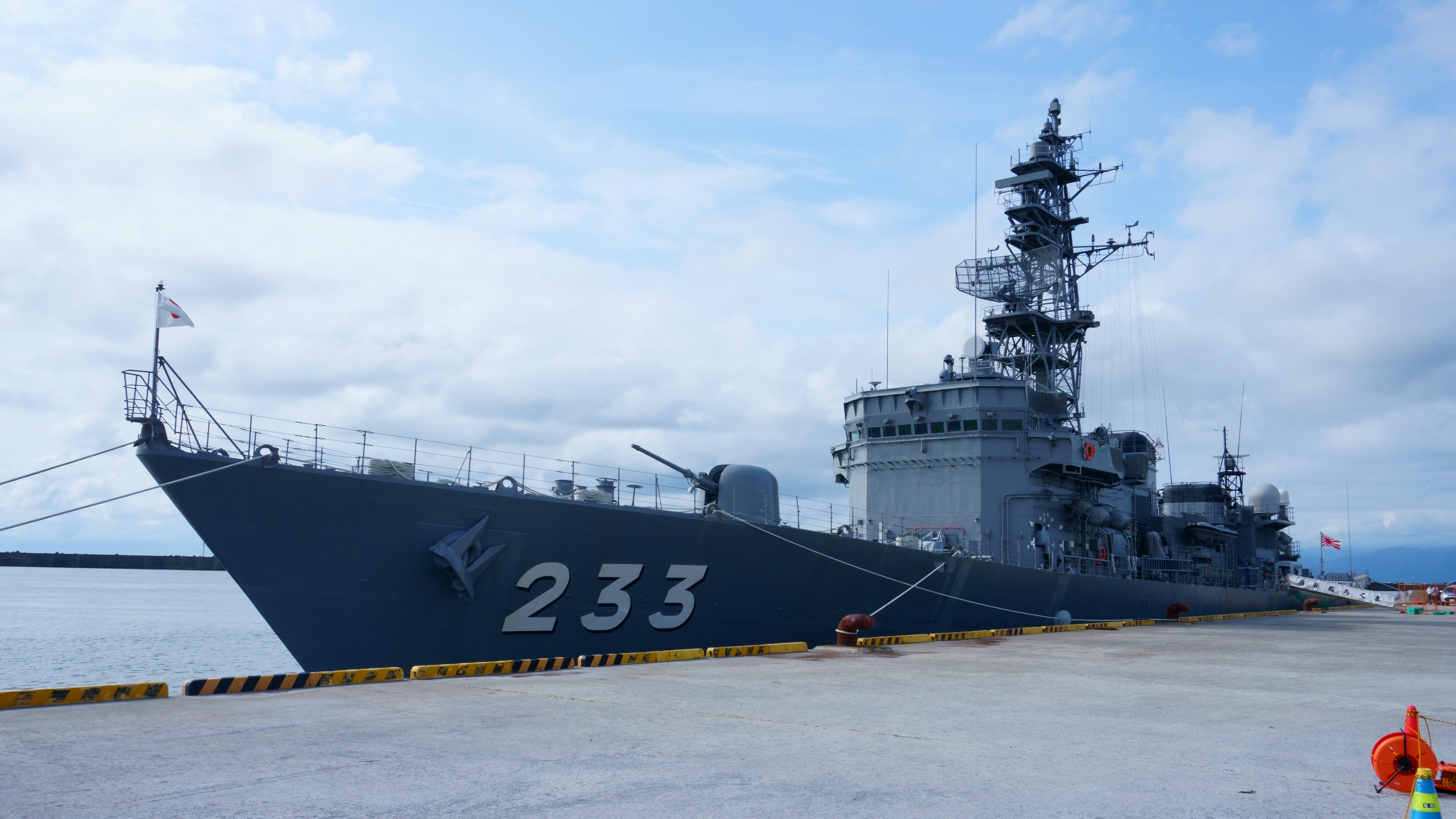
JS Ōyodo on 11 July 2021.
