= JS Sendai =

Japan Maritime Self-Defense Force destroyer escort

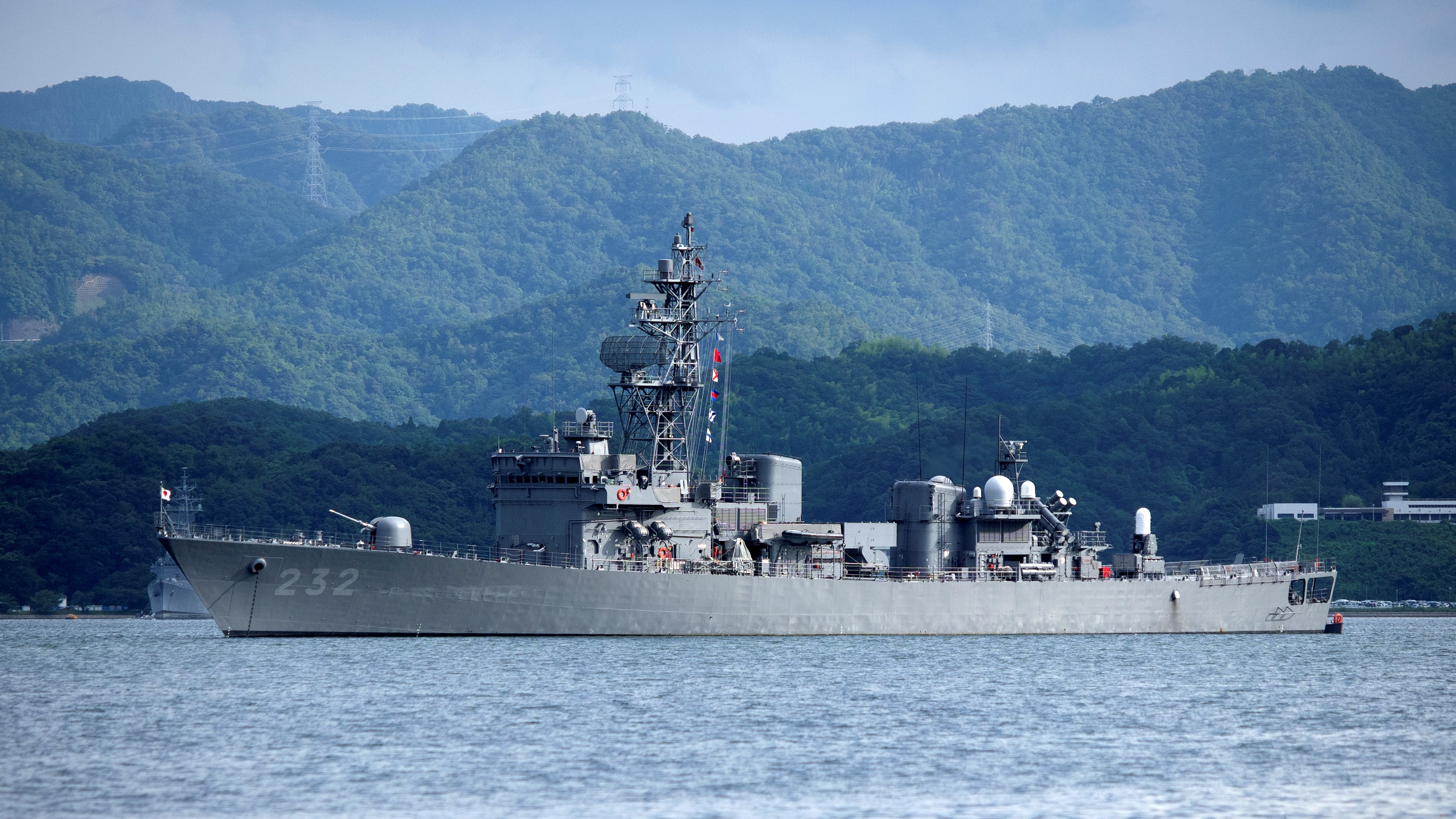
- JS Sendai

History

Japan
- Name: Sendai; (せんだい)
- Namesake: Sendai (1923)
- Ordered: 1987
- Builder: Sumitomo, Tokyo
- Laid down: 14 April 1989
- Launched: 19 December 1989
- Commissioned: 26 January 1990
- Home port: Maizuru
- Identification: MMSI number: 431999574; Pennant number: DE-232
- Status: Active

General characteristics
- Class & type: Abukuma-class destroyer escort
- Displacement: 2,000 tons standard; 2,550 tons full load
- Length: 357 ft (109 m)
- Beam: 44 ft (13 m)
- Draft: 12 ft (3.7 m)
- Propulsion: CODOG, two shafts; 2 × Kawasaki-RR SM1A gas turbines26,650 hp (19,870 kW); 2 × Mitsubishi S12U MTK diesels 6,000 hp (4,500 kW)
- Speed: 27 knots (50 km/h)
- Complement: 120
- Sensors & processing systems: FCS-2
- Armament: 8 × Harpoon missiles; ASROC octuple launcher; 1 × Otobreda 76 mm gun; 1 × Phalanx 20 mm CIWS; 2 × HOS-301 triple 324 mm (12.8 in) torpedo tubes

JS Sendai (DE-232) is the fourth ship of the Abukuma-class destroyer escorts. She was commissioned on 26 January 1990.

== Construction and career ==
Sendai was laid down at Sumitomo Heavy Industries, Tokyo Shipyard on 14 April 1989 and launched on 19 December 1989. She was commissioned on 15 March 1991 and deployed to Sasebo.

On June 20, 1991, the 39th Escort Corps was newly formed under the Sasebo District Force, and she was incorporated with JS Ōyodo. On March 24, 1997, the 39th Escort Corps was renamed to the 26th Escort Corps due to the revision of the corps numbers.

On March 25–26 2008, she was Hostship with the Thai Navy Naresuan-class frigate HTMS Naresuan and Chao Phraya-class frigate HTMS Saiburi, who called at Sasebo.

At Noon on February 16, 2018, she, along with a P-3C belonging to the 1st Air Group, intercepted a North Korean-registered tanker (Yu Jong No. 2) that was releasing Ningde Oil 078 in the open sea of the East China Sea (about 250 km East of Shanghai). These actions were prohibited by UN Security Council resolution. It was confirmed that she was doing what seemed to be Setori. This was the first time the Japanese Self-Defense Forces went up against ships from North Korea.

At Noon on June 29, 2018, a North Korean-registered tanker (AN SAN 1) came into contact with a ship of unknown ship registration in the high seas of the East China Sea (about 350 km off the South-Southeast of Shanghai). The Sendai confirmed that ship was performing what appeared to be a ship-to-ship transaction banned by a UN Security Council resolution. AN SAN No. 1 was designated by the United Nations Security Council North Korea Sanctions Committee as a target of asset freezing and port entry prohibition in March 2018, but the ship named was HOPE SEA in order to avoid sanctions. It was also confirmed that the ship was disguised as "No.".

From August 23 to August 27, 2019, she hosted the Canadian Navy Halifax-class frigate HMCS Ottawa, who called at Maizuru for a goodwill visit. Before Dawn on November 13, 2019, a North Korean-registered tanker (MU BONG 1) came into contact with a ship of unknown ship registration in the high seas of the East China Sea (about 280 km East of Shanghai). Sendai confirmed that she was performing what appeared to be a ship-to-ship transaction banned by a UN Security Council resolution. It was also confirmed that the other ship, whose nationality was unknown, covered the ship's name with something to avoid sanctions.

== Gallery ==
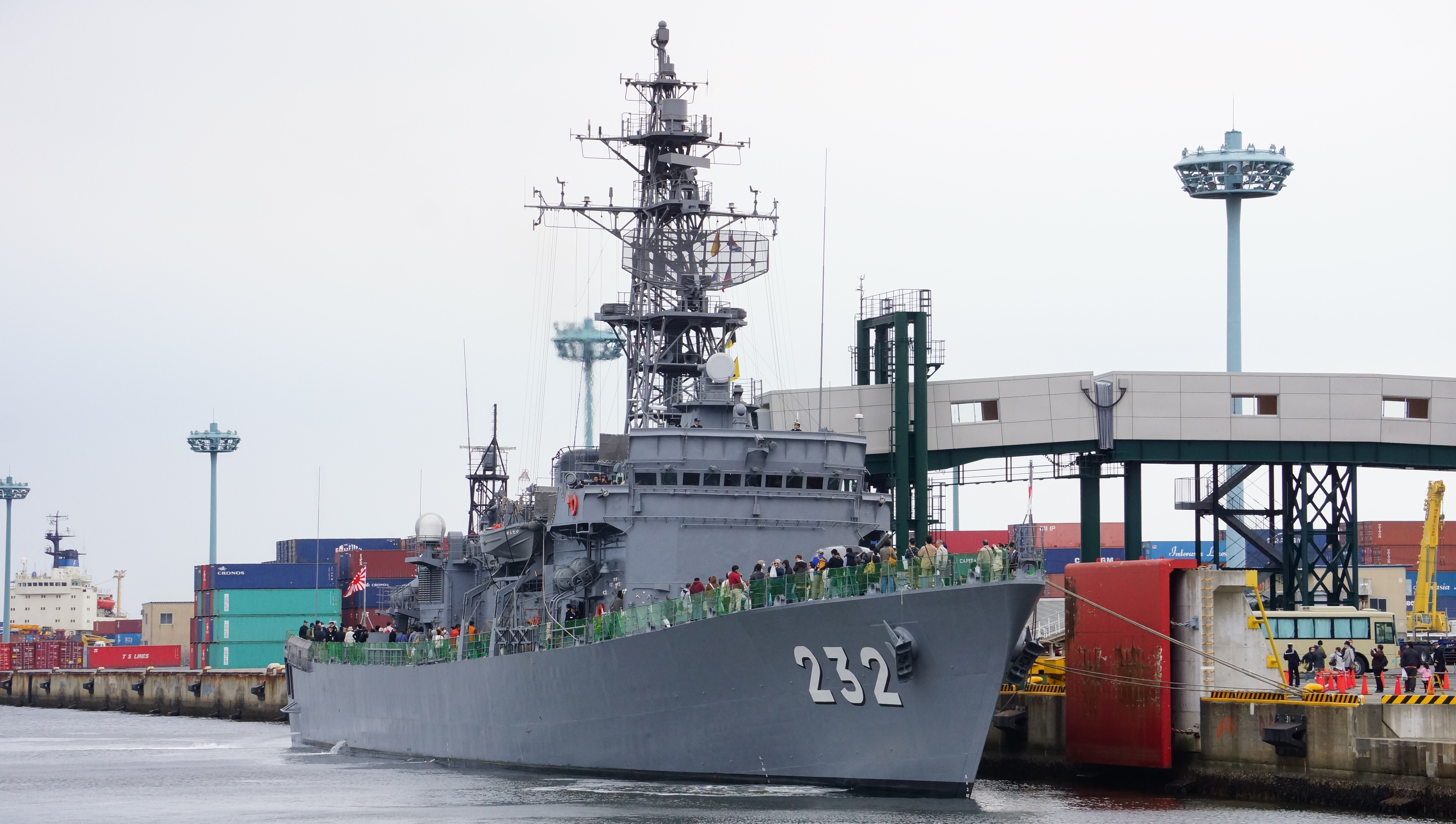
JS Sendai in Osaka on 10 March 2013.

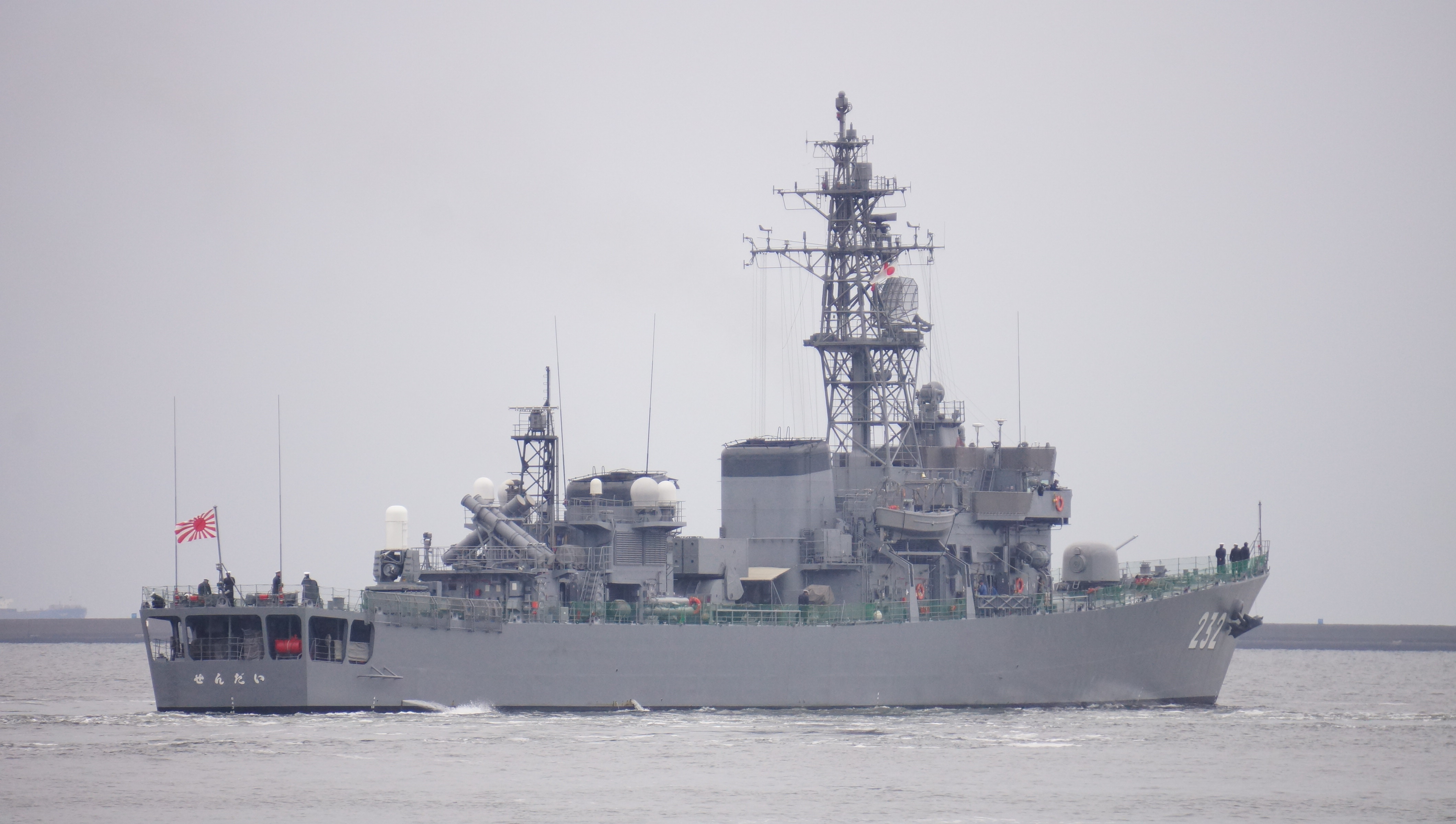
JS Sendai in Osaka on 10 March 2013.

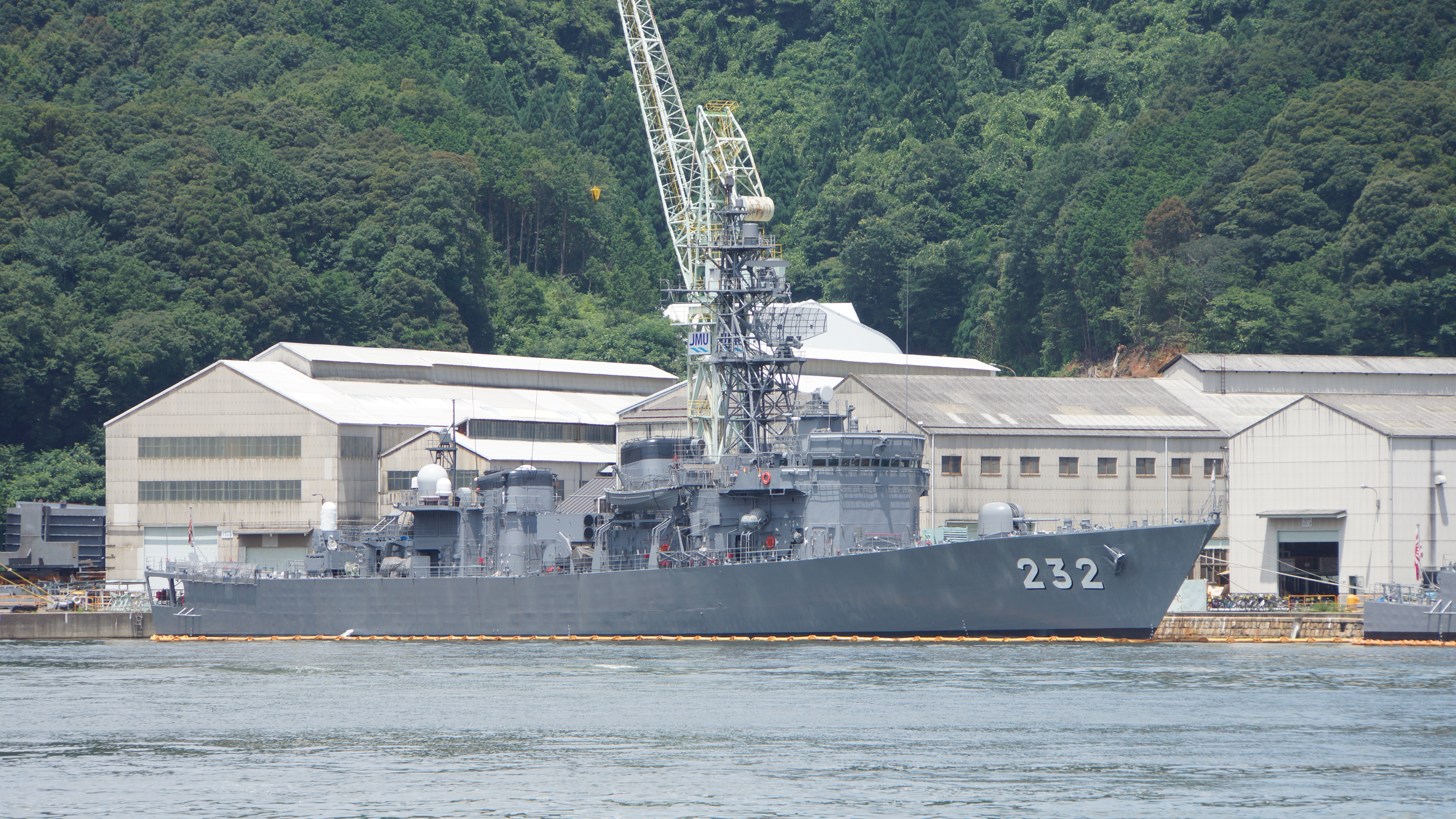
JS Sendai in Maizuru on 16 July 2016.

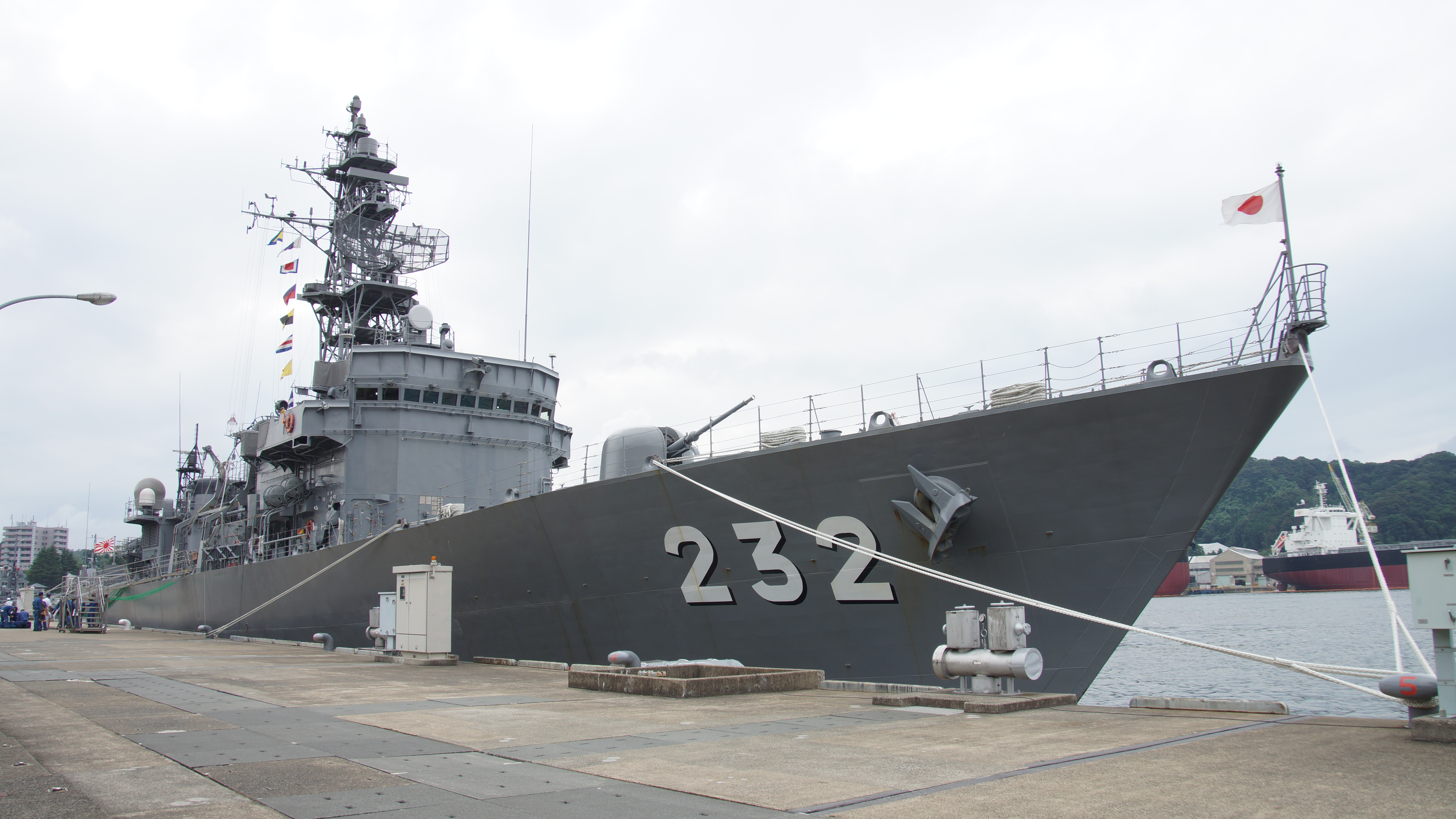
JS Sendai in Maizuru on 29 July 2017.

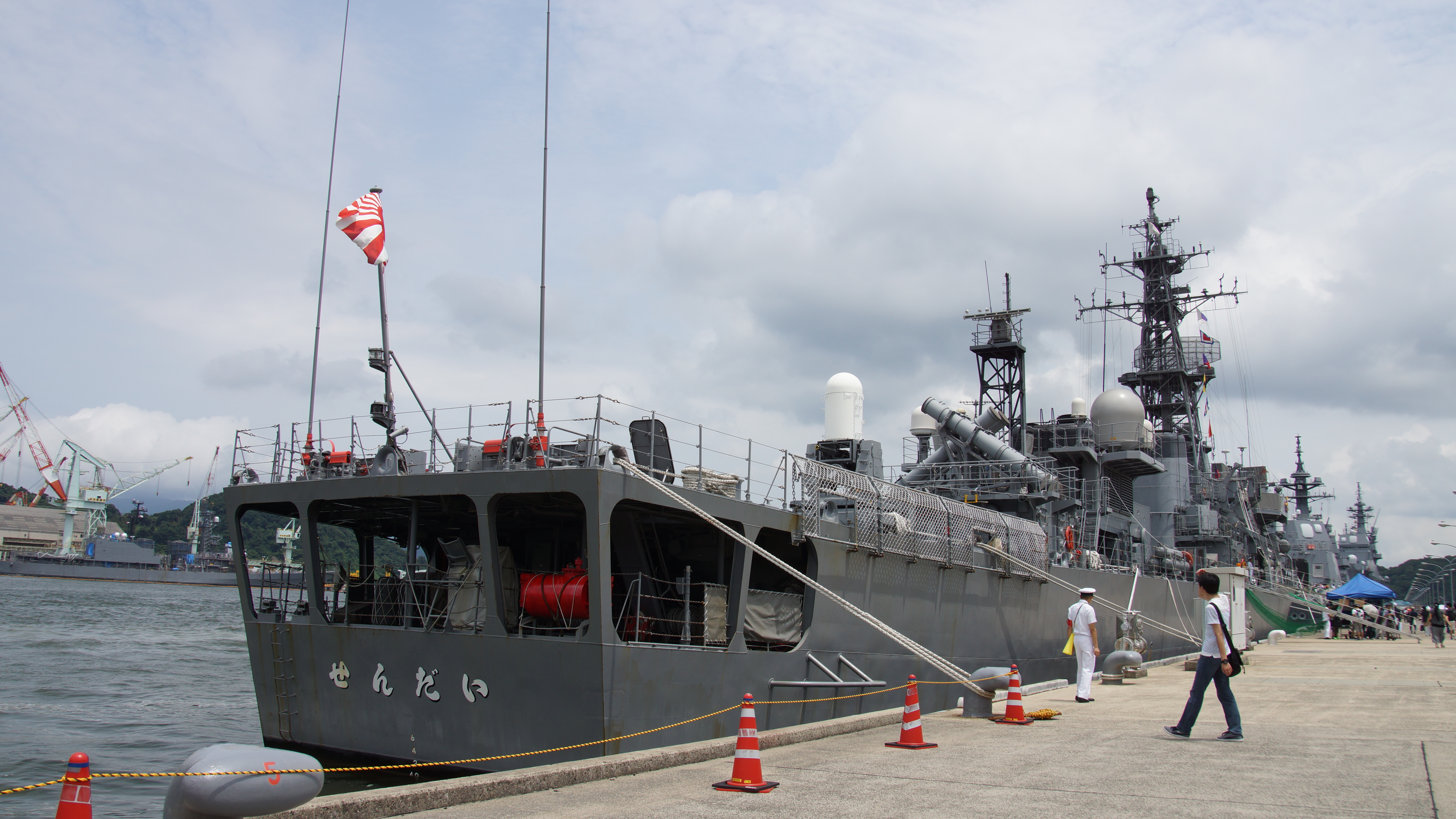
JS Sendai in Maizuru on 29 July 2017.

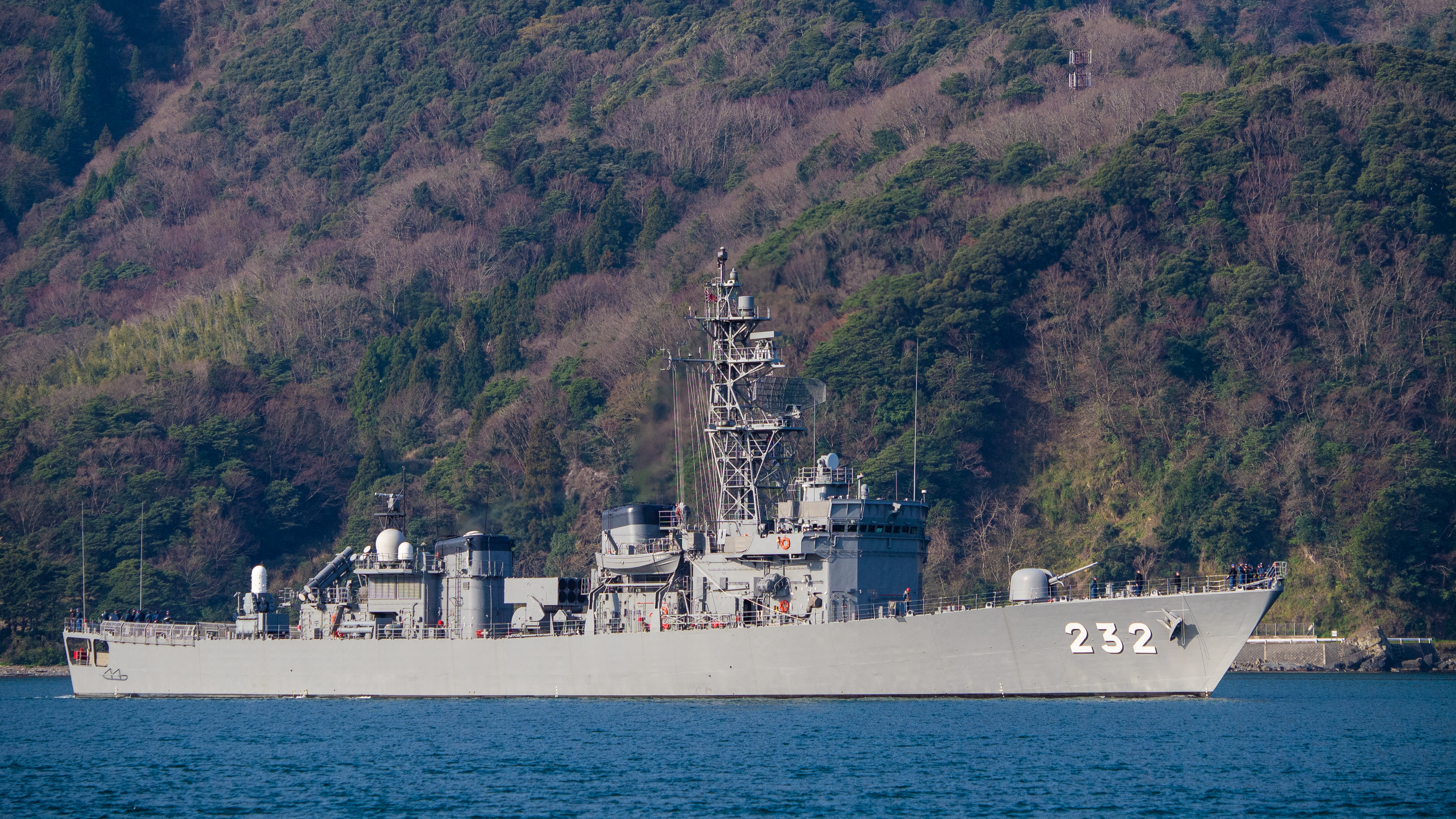
JS Sendai in Maizuru on 19 March 2020.
