= Abukuma-class destroyer escort =

General-purpose destroyer escort class in the Japanese Maritime Self-Defense Forces

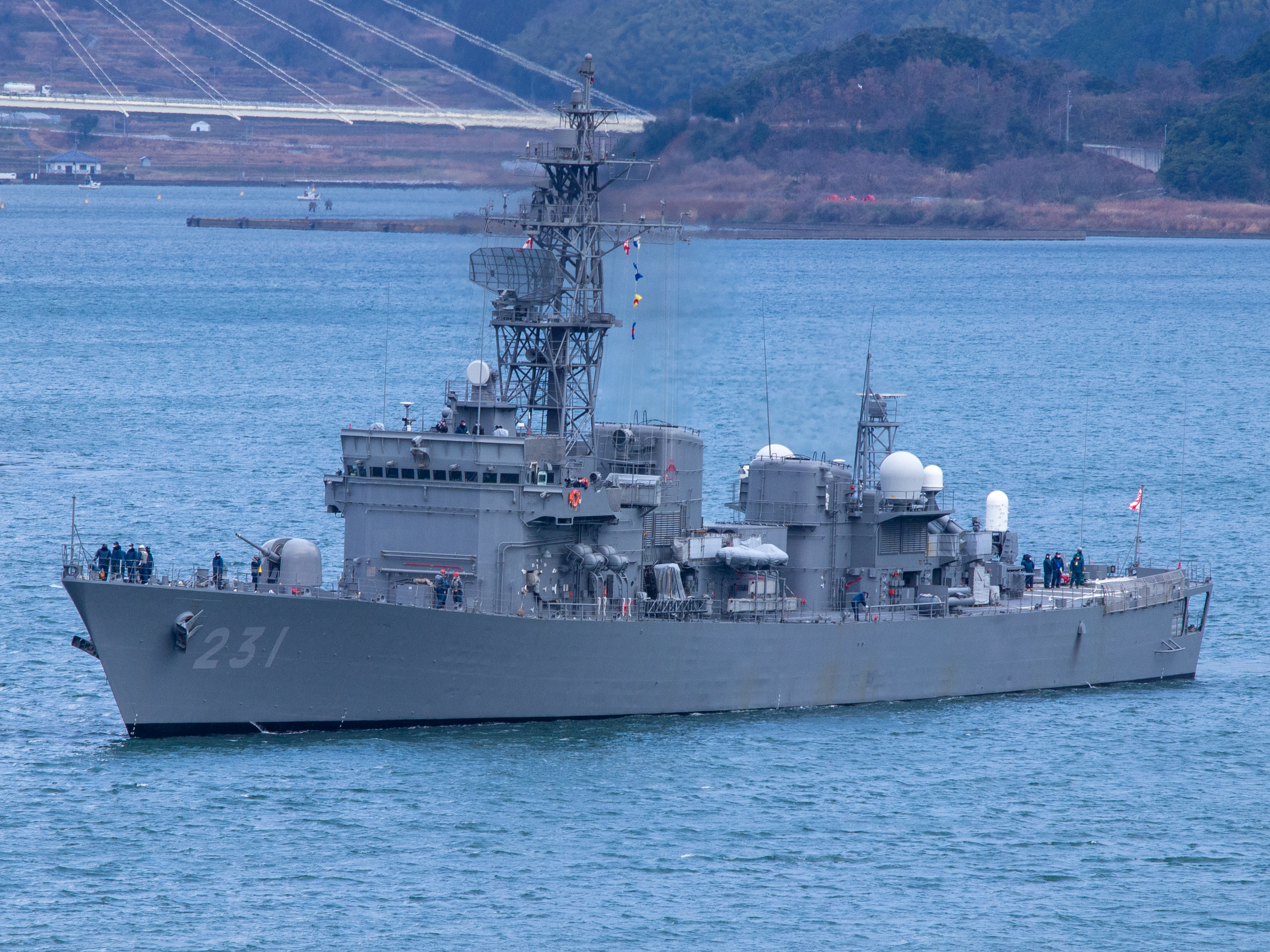
- JS Ōyodo in Maizuru port

Class overview
- Builders: Mitsui Engineering and Shipbuilding Company Limited; Sumitomo Heavy Industries, Ltd.
- Operators: Japan Maritime Self-Defense Force
- Preceded by: Yūbari class
- Succeeded by: Mogami class
- Built: 1988–1991
- In commission: 1989–present
- Planned: 11
- Completed: 6
- Canceled: 5
- Active: 6

General characteristics
- Type: Destroyer escort
- Displacement: 2,000 tons standard; 2,550 tons full load
- Length: 357 ft (109 m)
- Beam: 44 ft (13 m)
- Draft: 12 ft (3.7 m)
- Propulsion: CODOG, two shafts; 2 × Kawasaki-RR SM1A gas turbines 26,650 hp (19,870 kW); 2 × Mitsubishi S12U MTK diesels 6,000 hp (4,500 kW)
- Speed: 27 knots (50 km/h)
- Complement: 120
- Sensors & processing systems: OPS-14 air search radar; OPS-20 marine radar; OPS-28C low-altitude surveillance/surface surveillance; FCS-2 fire control system; Sonar: OQS-8
- Electronic warfare & decoys: NEC NOLR-6B ESM + OLR-3 Jamming
- Armament: 8 × Harpoon missiles; ASROC octuple launcher; 1 × Otobreda 76 mm gun; 1 × Phalanx 20 mm CIWS; 2 × HOS-301 triple 324 mm (12.8 in) torpedo tubes; 2 x Mk.137 SRBOC chaff launcher

The Abukuma-class destroyer escort (or frigate) (Japanese: あぶくま型護衛艦, romanized: Abukuma-gata-goeikan) is the general-purpose destroyer escort of the Japan Maritime Self-Defense Force (JMSDF). It is the successor of the earlier Yūbari class. It is being replaced by the Mogami-class frigates.

== History ==
The first Abukuma-class destroyer escort ship was first laid down in 1988 and completed in 1989.

In April 2022, the Mogami-class frigate was reported to be commissioned to eventually replace the Abukama-class destroyers.

== Design ==
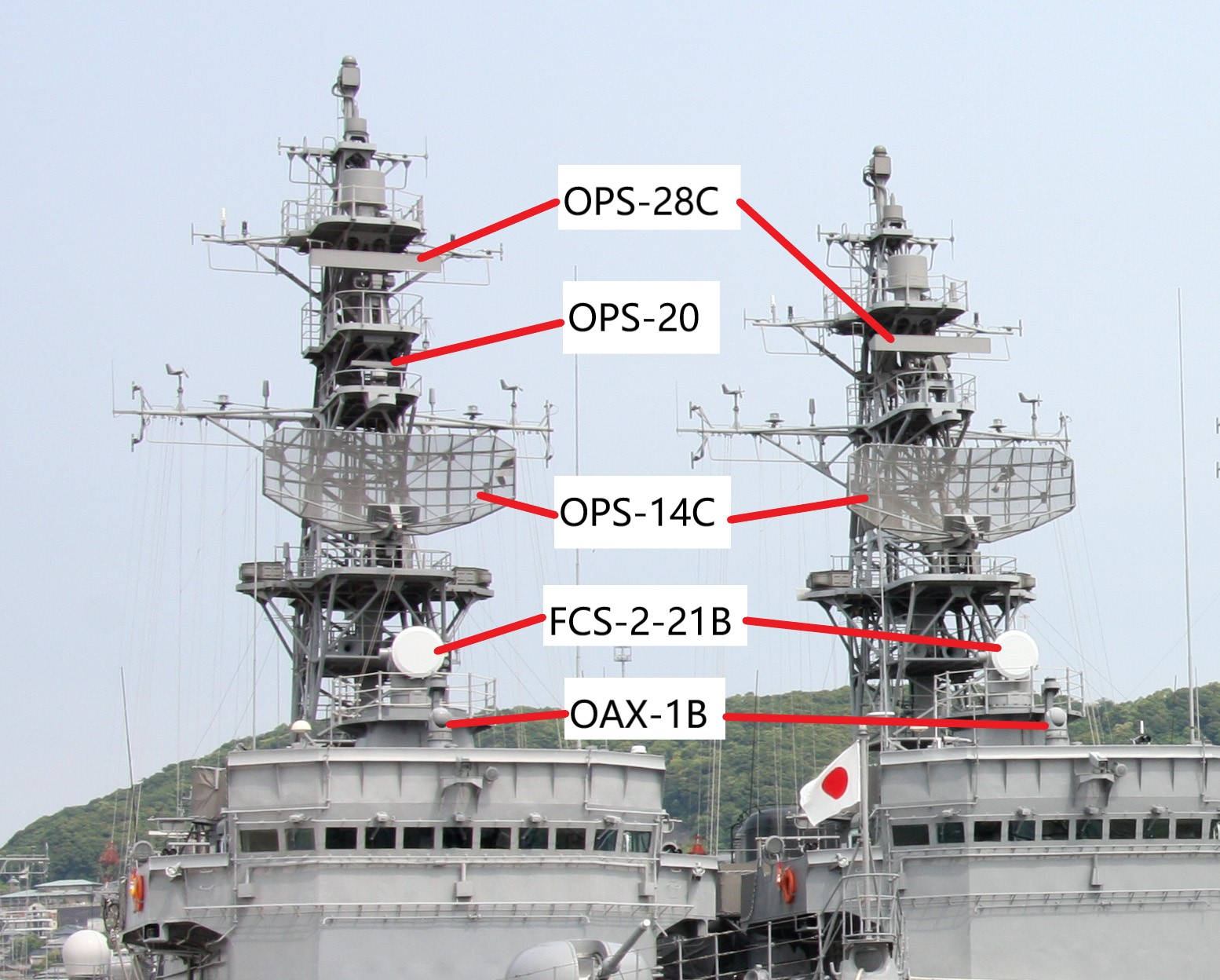
Electronic systems on Abukuma-class destroyer escorts masts

This class was planned to replace the earlier Isuzu class and possess both anti-submarine warfare (ASW) capability, as the successor of the Chikugo class, and anti-surface warfare (ASuW) capability, as the successor of the Yūbari class, but there are many enhancements, as follows below.

=== Introduction of stealth technology ===
This class is the first combatant ship of the JMSDF with stealth technology. Their superstructure has traditional vertical surfaces, but their hulls are angled to reduce their radar cross section.

=== Electronic warfare ===
This is the first destroyer escort class with the Naval Tactical Data System and OYQ-7 combat direction system. It is also the first destroyer escort class which has ECM capability - with the OLT-3 jammer.

=== Weapon systems ===
The Short Range Air Defense system comprises the OPS-14 air-search radar, the OPS-28 surface search and target acquisition radar, one Otobreda 76 mm rapid-firing gun, controlled by the FCS-2 fire-control system, and a Phalanx CIWS. The OPS-14 is the Japanese equivalent of the American AN/SPS-49 radar, and the OPS-28 is the equivalent of the American TAS Mk.23. Phalanx CIWS has given the ships an improved self-defence capability against anti-ship missiles. Mk.31 RAM GMWS Point Defense Missile System was planned, but it is not installed yet.

The ASW system comprises an OQS-8 hull-sonar (Japanese equivalent of the American DE-1167), ASROC anti-submarine rocket from the Type 74 octuple launcher (Japanese license-built version of the American Mark 16 GMLS), and lightweight ASW torpedoes from two HOS-301 triple 324 mm (12.8 in) torpedo tubes. A tactical towed-array sonar system was planned, but it is not installed yet.

The JMSDF intended to build eleven ships of this class; ultimately, only six were built because Hatsuyuki-class destroyers started deploying in distinct forces. All six vessels in this class are named after Japanese rivers.

== Export ==
On 6 July 2025, the Philippine Navy (PN) reported the possible transfer of the Abukuma-class to the Philippines. It is expected that more or less six ships will be transferred if they are found to be in good condition. A status check visit is scheduled for the summer of 2025, at which time the Philippine side hopes to identify at least five vessels subject to inspection once PN sailors visit Japan. The transfer was based on an agreement during a bilateral meeting in Singapore in June 2025. The Yomiuri Shimbun suggests that equipment previously installed on the Abukuma-class can be changed if needed to meet PN requirements.

On 8 October 2025, the PN reported that they are interested in the ships if Japan would allow the acquisition of at least three out of the six decommissioned Abukuma-class ships, noting that Japan may not offer all 6 ships to the Philippines and may offer the rest of the ships to other Asian countries. On 5 May 2026, Tokyo and Manila aim to fast track the acquisition of the ships to the PN during Japanese Defense Minister Shinjirō Koizumi's visit to the Philippines with the formation of a working group. On 7 July 2026, Philippine Defense Secretary Gilberto Teodoro reported that the PN will acquire five of the Abukuma-class under Official Security Assistance (OSA). This transfer was confirmed in 2026 and was expected to begin with the retirement of the vessels from Japanese service in 2027.

On 28 October 2026, Defense Secretary Gilberto Teodoro Jr. and Japanese Defense Minister Shinjiro Koizumi spoke on having the first Abukama transferred as soon as possible during their bilateral meeting at the Association of Southeast Asian Nations (ASEAN) defense meetings without specifying which destroyer and the earliest date of delivery.

== Ships in the class ==
Pennant no.	Name	Laid down	Launched	Commissioned	Home port	Status
DE-229	Abukuma	17 March 1988	21 December 1988	12 December 1989	Kure	Active
DE-230	Jintsū	14 April 1988	31 January 1989	28 February 1990	Sasebo	Active
DE-231	Ōyodo	8 March 1989	19 December 1989	23 January 1991	Ominato	Active
DE-232	Sendai	14 April 1989	26 January 1990	15 March 1991	Maizuru	Active
DE-233	Chikuma	14 February 1991	25 January 1992	24 February 1993	Ominato	Active
DE-234	Tone	8 February 1991	6 December 1991	8 February 1993	Kure	Active
