= Japanese submarine Harushio =

At least two warships of Japan have been named Harushio:

- JDS Harushio (SS-563), an Asashio-class submarine launched in 1967 and struck in 1984.
- JDS Harushio (SS-583), a Harushio-class submarine launched in 1989 and struck in 2009.
