= Japanese ship Arashio =

At least three warships of Japan have been named Arashio:

- Japanese destroyer Arashio, an Asashio-class destroyer launched in 1937 and sunk in 1943.
- JDS Arashio (SS-565), an Asashio-class submarine launched in 1968 and struck in 1986.
- JDS Arashio (SS-586), a Harushio-class submarine launched in 1992 and struck in 2012.
