= List of ship launches in 1989 =

The list of ship launches in 1989 includes a chronological list of all ships launched in 1989.

Date	Ship	Class / type	Builder	Location	Country	Notes
21 January	Marlborough	Type 23 frigate	Swan Hunter	Wallsend	United Kingdom	
31 January	Jintsū	Abukuma-class destroyer escort			Japan	
2 February	Kalkgrund	Stollengrund-class multipurpose boats	Kröger Shipyard	Schacht-Audorf	West Germany	For German Navy
24 February	Lady Diana	yacht	Flender Werke	Lübeck	West Germany	For NAVTOL
7 March	Lord of the Isles	Ferry	Ferguson Shipbuilders	Port Glasgow	United Kingdom	For Caledonian MacBrayne
11 March	Cowpens	Ticonderoga-class cruiser	Bath Iron Works	Bath, Maine	United States	
17 March	Seabourn Spirit	Cruise ship	Schichau Seebeckwerft	Bremerhaven	West Germany	For Seabourn Cruise Line
19 March	Victory	ferry	Mitsubishi Heavy Industries	Kobe	Japan	For Higashi Nippon Ferry Co.
7 April	Lady Sarah	yacht	Flender Werke	Lübeck	West Germany	
8 April	Argyll	Type 23 frigate	Yarrow Shipbuilders	Glasgow	United Kingdom	
15 April	Cinderella	Cruiseferry	Wärtsilä Marine Perno shipyard	Turku	Finland	For SF Line for Viking Line traffic
26 April	Mittelgrund	Stollengrund-class multipurpose boats	Elsflether Shipyard	Elsflether	West Germany	For German Navy
5 May	Arco Axe	Dredger	Appledore Shipbuilders Ltd.	Appledore	United Kingdom	For Hanson Aggregates Marine Ltd.
5 May	Melbourne	Adelaide-class frigate	AMECON	Williamstown, Victoria	Australia	
6 May	Rushmore	Whidbey Island-class dock landing ship	Avondale Shipyard	Avondale, Louisiana	United States	
26 June	Vasco da Gama	Vasco da Gama-class frigate	Blohm + Voss	Hamburg	West Germany	
2 July	Gettysburg	Ticonderoga-class cruiser	Bath Iron Works	Bath, Maine	United States	
3 July	Scranton	Los Angeles-class submarine	Newport News Shipbuilding	Newport News, Virginia	United States	
8 July	Vancouver	Halifax-class frigate	Saint John Shipbuilding	Saint John, New Brunswick	Canada	
13 July	Bant	Stollengrund-class multipurpose boats	Kröger Shipyard	Schacht-Audorf	West Germany	For German Navy
19 July	Reina Sofía	Santa María-class frigate	Bazan	Ferrol	Spain	
22 July	Henry Eckford	Henry J. Kaiser-class replenishment oiler	Pennsylvania Shipbuilding Company	Philadelphia, Pennsylvania	United States	
26 July	Harushio	Harushio-class submarine			Japan	
25 August	Nordic Empress	Cruise ship	Chantiers de l'Atlantique	Saint-Nazaire	France	For Royal Caribbean International
27 August	Kalypso	Cruiseferry	Wärtsilä Marine Perno shipyard	Turku	Finland	For Rederi AB Slite for Viking Line traffic
1 September	Chosin	Ticonderoga-class cruiser	Ingalls Shipbuilding	Pascagoula, Mississippi	United States	
11 September	Umigiri	Asagiri-class destroyer			Japan	
12 September	Kaiwo Maru II	Four-masted Barque	Sumitomo Heavy Industries		Japan	
16 September	Arleigh Burke	Arleigh Burke-class destroyer	Bath Iron Works	Bath, Maine	United States	
23 September	Pecos	Henry J. Kaiser-class replenishment oiler	Avondale Shipyard	Avondale, Louisiana	United States	
September	Shankul	Type 209 submarine	Mazagon Dock Limited	Mumbai	India	For Indian Navy
September	William M	Z-drive tug	North American Shipbuilding		United States	For Alpha Marine Services
2 October	Breitgrund	Stollengrund-class multipurpose boats	Elsfleth Shipyard	Elsfleth	West Germany	For German Navy
14 October	West Virginia	Ohio-class submarine	Electric Boat	Groton, Connecticut	United States	
27 October	City of London	Dredger	Appledore Shipbuilders Ltd.	Appledore	United Kingdom	For United Marine Dredgers Ltd.
31 October	RMS St Helena	Royal Mail Ship	Hall, Russell & Company	Aberdeen	United Kingdom	
6 November	Silja Serenade	Cruiseferry	Wärtsilä Marine (estate) Perno shipyard	Turku	Finland	For Effoa for Silja Line traffic
11 November	Ashland	Whidbey Island-class dock landing ship	Avondale Shipyard	Avondale, Louisiana	United States	
19 November	Horizon	Cruise ship	Meyer Werft	Papenburg	West Germany	For Celebrity Cruises
5 December	Shepparton	Paluma-class motor launch			Australia	
19 December	Ōyodo	Abukuma-class destroyer escort			Japan	
Unknown date	Cheonan	Pohang-class corvette			South Korea	For Republic of Korea Navy
Unknown date	Corsair	Hovercraft	Blohm + Voss	Hamburg	West Germany	For Blohm + Voss (prototype)
Unknown date	Happy Hooker	Ferry	Arklow Marine Services Inc.	Arklow	Ireland	For Doolin2Aran Ferries.
Unknown date	Maid of the Islands	Ferry	David Abels Boatbuilders Ltd.	Bristol	United Kingdom	For Brownsea Island Ferries Ltd.
Unknown date	Melwey	Pilot boat	David Abels Boatbuilders Ltd.	Bristol	United Kingdom	For Weymouth Harbour Board.
Unknown date	Tunas Samudera	Brigantine	Brooke Yachts International.	Lowestoft	United Kingdom	For Royal Malaysian Navy.
Unknown date	Vigilance	Survey ship	David Abels Boatbuilders Ltd.	Bristol	United Kingdom	For Environment Agency.
