= JS Wakashio =

Harushio-class submarine

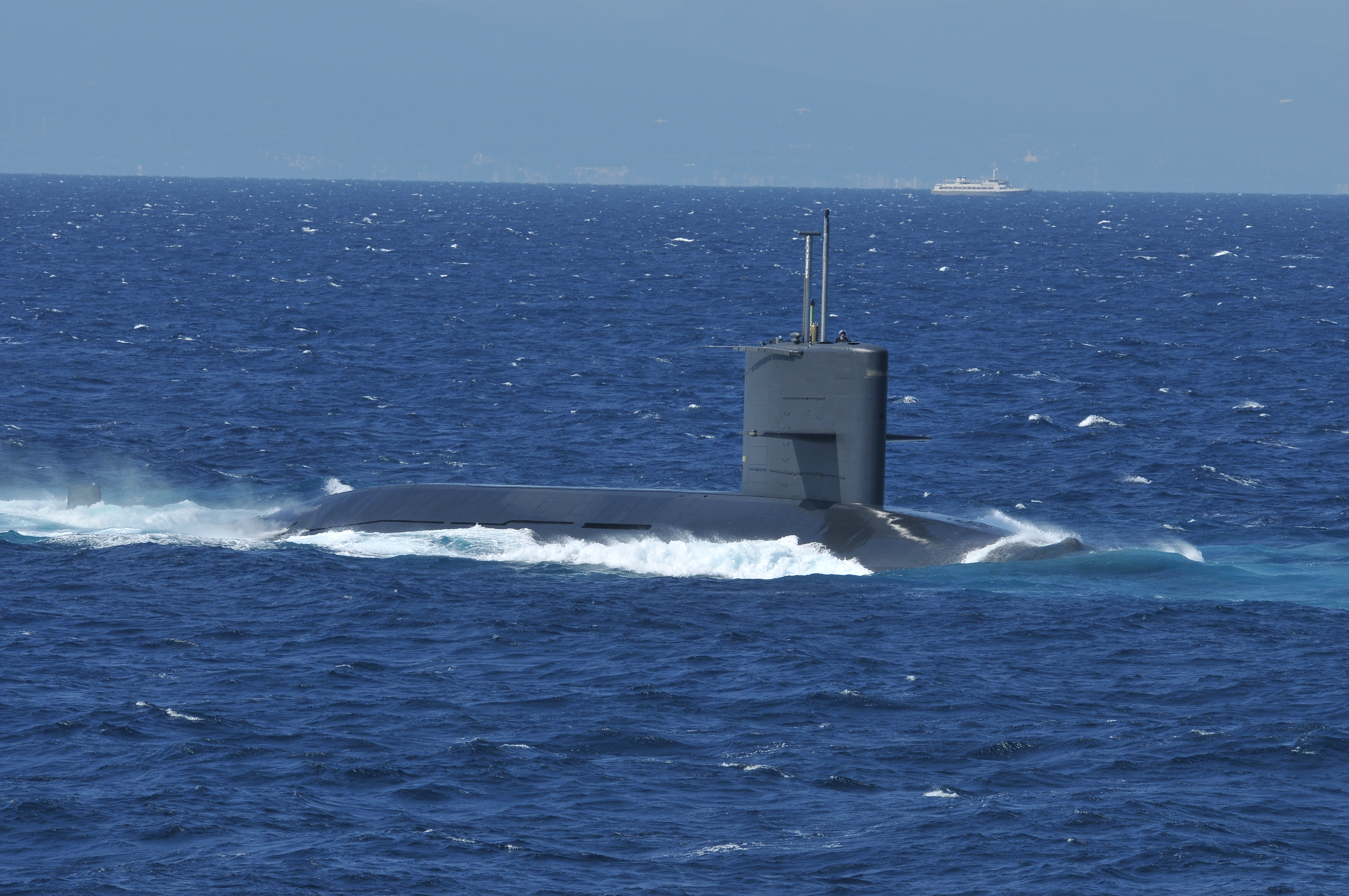
- JS Wakashio

History

Japan
- Name: Wakashio; (わかしお)
- Ordered: 1990
- Builder: Mitsubishi, Kobe
- Laid down: 12 December 1990
- Launched: 22 January 1993
- Commissioned: 1 March 1994
- Decommissioned: 5 March 2013
- Home port: Kure
- Identification: Pennant number: SS-587
- Fate: Scrapped, 27 August 2015

General characteristics
- Class & type: Harushio-class submarine
- Displacement: Surface: 2,450 tonnes; Submerged: 3,200 tonnes
- Length: 77.0 m (252 ft 7 in)
- Beam: 10 m (32 ft 10 in)
- Draft: 7.7 m (25 ft 3 in)
- Propulsion: 2 × Kawasaki 12V25/25S diesel electric engines; 2 × shafts
- Speed: Surfaced: 12 kn (22 km/h; 14 mph); Submerged: 20 kn (37 km/h; 23 mph)
- Complement: 75
- Sensors & processing systems: Hughes/Oki ZQQ 5B Sonar; ZQR 1 towed array; JRC ZPS 6 I-band search radar
- Armament: 6 × HU-606 533 mm (21 in) torpedo tubes for: Type 89 torpedo

JS Wakashio (SS-587) was the fifth ship of the Harushio-class submarine of Japan Maritime Self-Defense Force.

== Development and design ==
This type is a teardrop type ship type, a so-called SSS (Single Screw Submarine) type with a single-axis propulsion system, and the structural style is a complete double-shell structure, following the method since the Uzushio-class (42SS) in the basic design concept. Meanwhile, the type, dual vibration-damping support of the anti-vibration support or main engine of the main motor, the auxiliary equipment and pipe systems, static power supply, and rectification of the hole opening on the bottom of the ship. Through these efforts, it was decided that the masker sound insulation device was unnecessary, and in the latter model of this model, it was so quiet that it would not be detected even if snorkeling was continued until the sonobuoy was visible.

== Construction and career ==
Wakashio was laid down at Mitsubishi Heavy Industries Kobe Shipyard on 12 December 1990 as the 1990 plan 2400-ton submarine No. 8102 and it was launched on 22 January 1993. She was commissioned on 1 March 1994 and homeported in Kure. She belonged to the 3rd Submarine of the 1st Submarine Group.

Participated in RIMPAC 1995 from 23 August to 28 November.

On 12 March 1997, the 3rd Submarine was renamed the 6th Submarine by exchanging unit numbers.

Participated in RIMPAC 1998 from 27 August to 26 November.

Participated in RIMPAC 2001 from August 29 to November 28.

She was decommissioned on 5 March 2013 and scrapped in Dokai Bay, Kyushu on 27 August 2015.

== Gallery ==
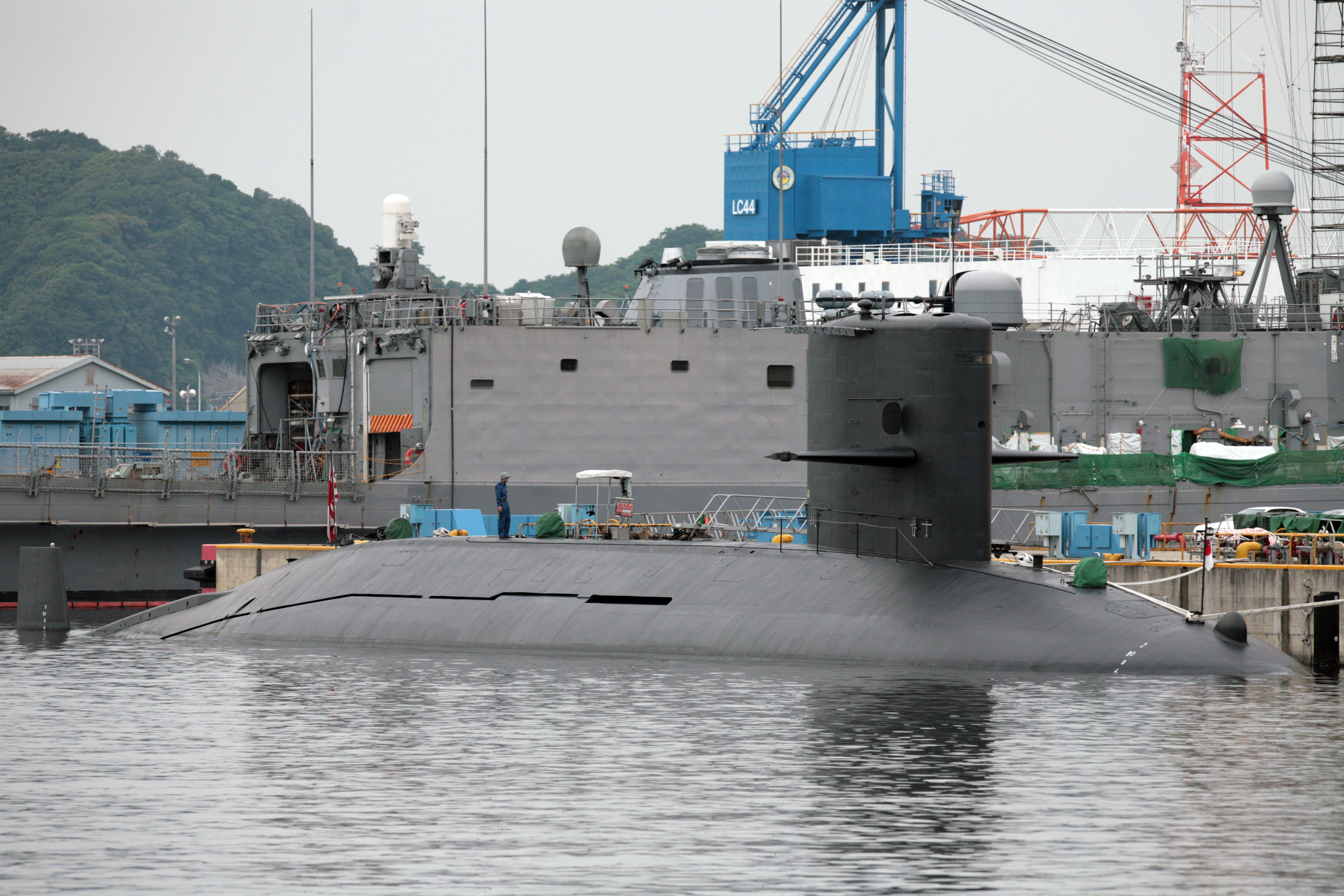
JS Wakashio in Yokosuka on 10 June 2006
