= JS Hayashio =

Harushio-class submarine

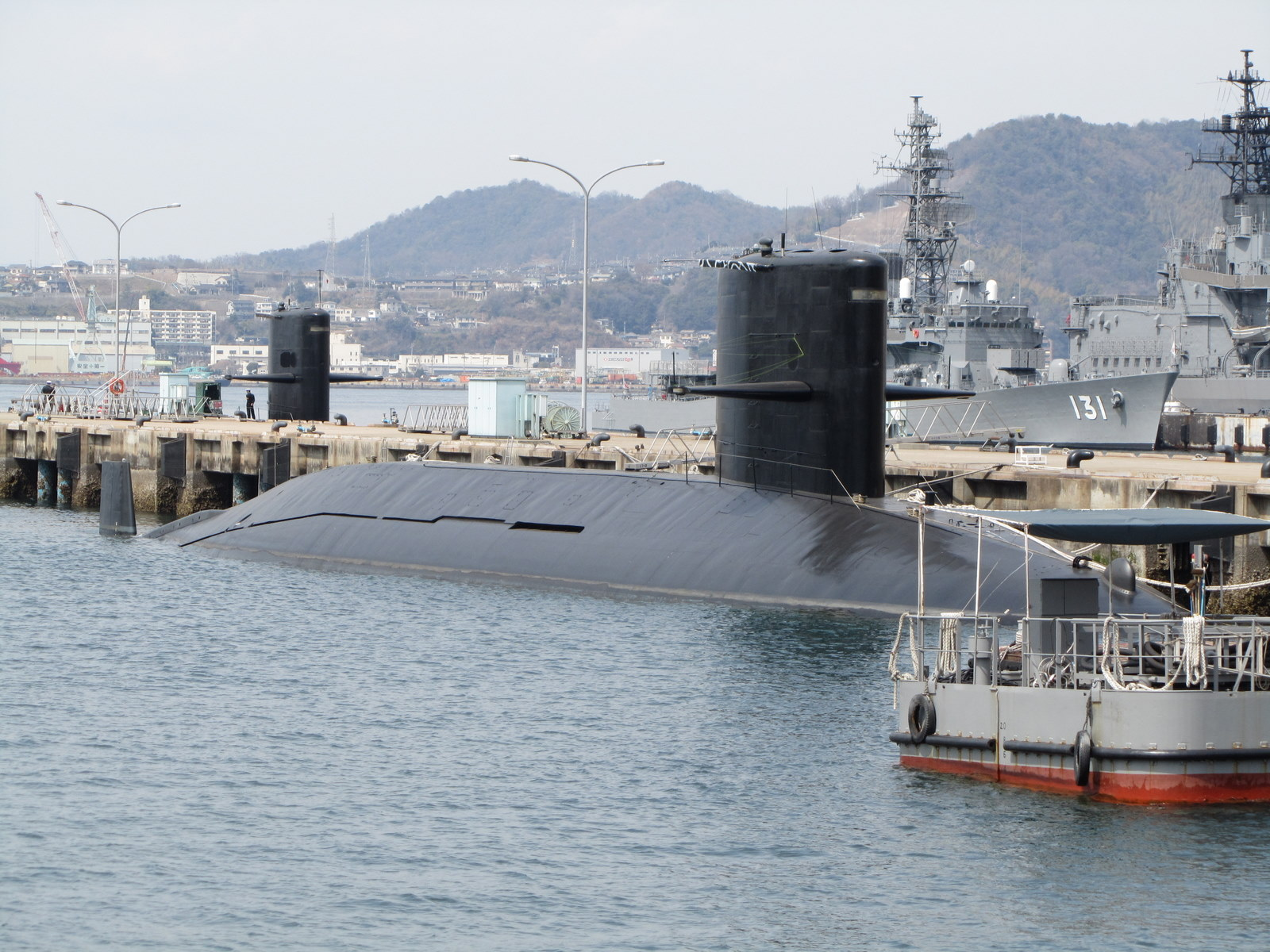
- JS Hayashio

History

Japan
- Name: Hayashio; (はやしお)
- Ordered: 1988
- Builder: Kawasaki, Kobe
- Laid down: 9 December 1988
- Launched: 17 January 1991
- Commissioned: 25 March 1992
- Decommissioned: 15 March 2011
- Reclassified: TSS-3606
- Home port: Kure
- Identification: Pennant number: SS-585
- Fate: Scrapped, April 2014

General characteristics
- Class & type: Harushio-class submarine
- Displacement: Surface: 2,450 tonnes; Submerged: 3,200 tonnes
- Length: 77.0 m (252 ft 7 in)
- Beam: 10 m (32 ft 10 in)
- Draft: 7.7 m (25 ft 3 in)
- Propulsion: 2 × Kawasaki 12V25/25S diesel electric engines; 2 × shafts
- Speed: Surfaced: 12 kn (22 km/h; 14 mph); Submerged: 20 kn (37 km/h; 23 mph)
- Complement: 75
- Sensors & processing systems: Hughes/Oki ZQQ 5B Sonar; ZQR 1 towed array; JRC ZPS 6 I-band search radar
- Armament: 6 × HU-606 533 mm (21 in) torpedo tubes for: Type 89 torpedo

JS Hayashio (SS-585) was the third ship of the Harushio-class submarine of Japan Maritime Self-Defense Force.

== Development and design ==
This type is a teardrop type ship type, a so-called SSS (Single Screw Submarine) type with a single-axis propulsion system, and the structural style is a complete double-shell structure, following the method since the Uzushio-class (42SS) in the basic design concept. Meanwhile, the type, dual vibration-damping support of the anti-vibration support or main engine of the main motor, the auxiliary equipment and pipe systems, static power supply, and rectification of the hole opening on the bottom of the ship. Through these efforts, it was decided that the masker sound insulation device was unnecessary, and in the latter model of this model, it was so quiet that it would not be detected even if snorkeling was continued until the sonobuoy was visible.

== Construction and career ==
Hayashio was laid down at Kawasaki Heavy Industries Kobe Shipyard on 9 December 1988 as the 1988 plan 2400-ton submarine No. 8100 and it was launched on 17 January 1991. She was commissioned on 25 March 1992 and homeported in Kure. She belonged to the 5th Submarine of the 1st Submarine Group.

From 25 August until 27 November, she participated in RIMPAC 1993.

She participated in RIMPAC 1998.

From 31 August until 3 December, she participated in RIMPAC 1999.

On March 7, 2008, she was reclassified to a training submarine, the ship registration number was changed to TSS-3606, and it was transferred to the 1st training submarine under the direct control of the submarine fleet .

She was decommissioned on 15 March 2011 and scrapped in Dokai Bay, Kyushu in April 2014.

== Gallery ==
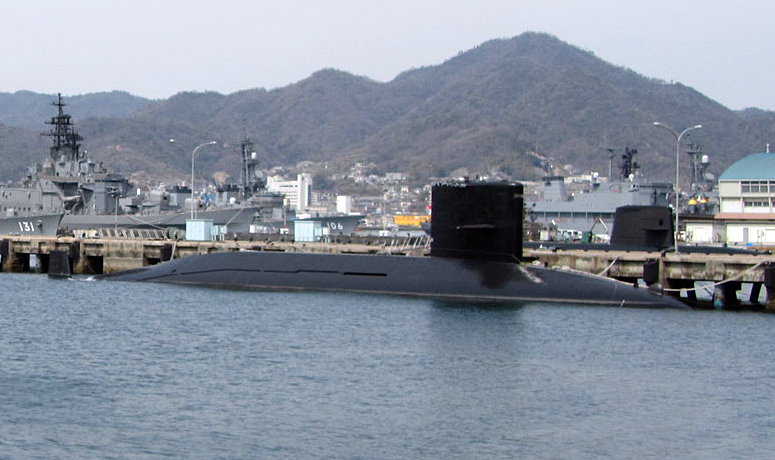
Ex-JS Hayashio at Kure on 19 March 2011

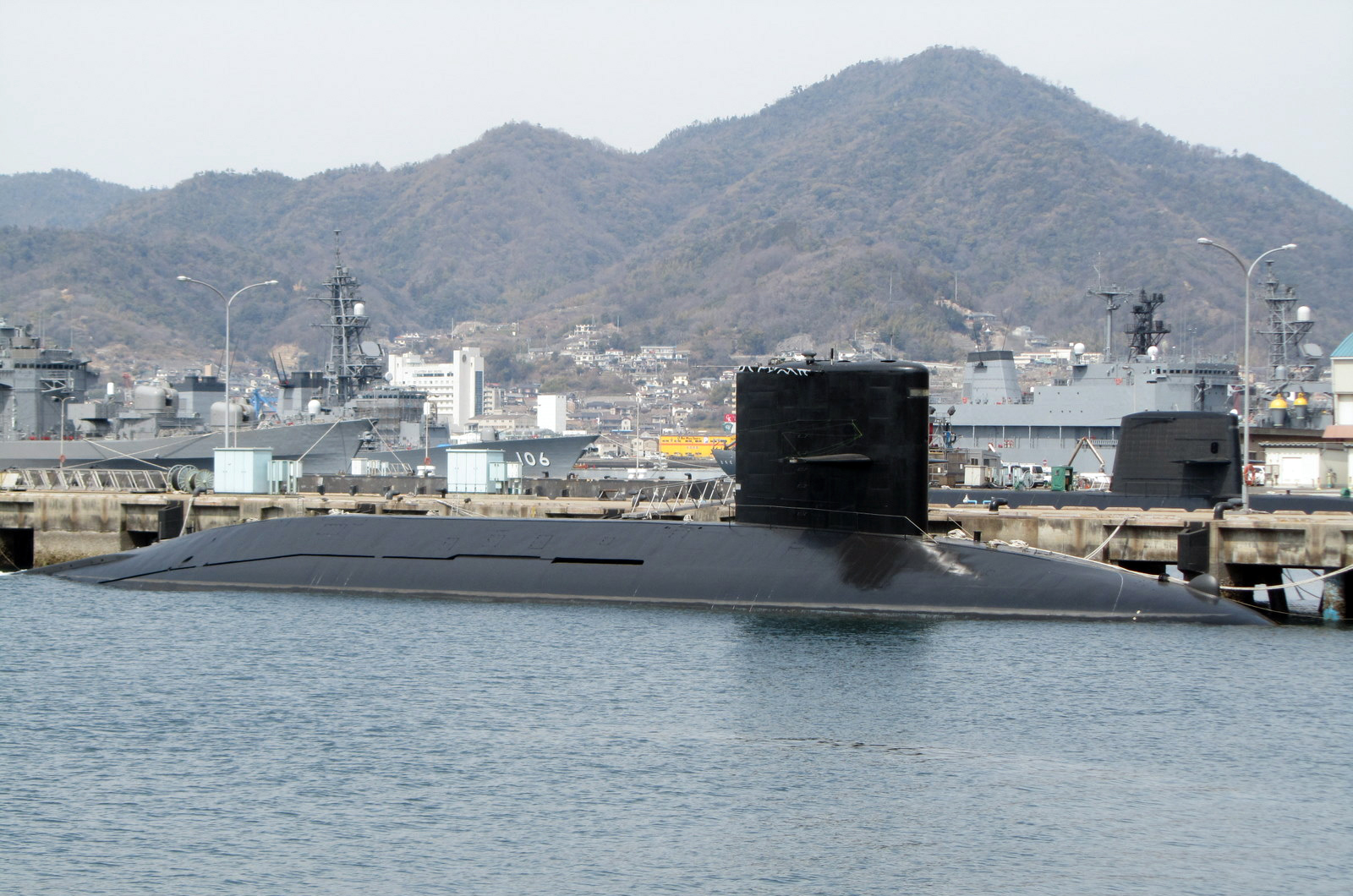

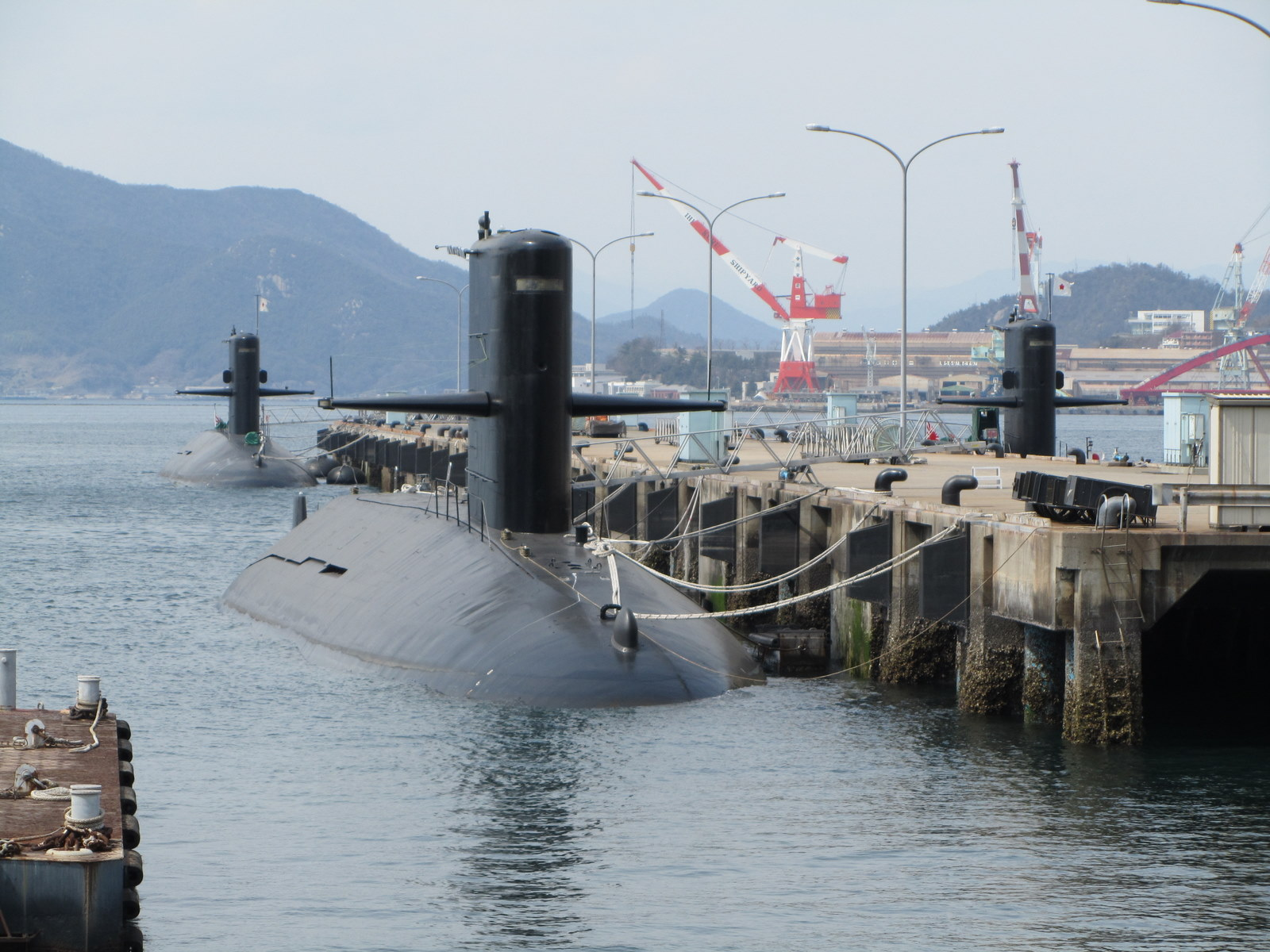

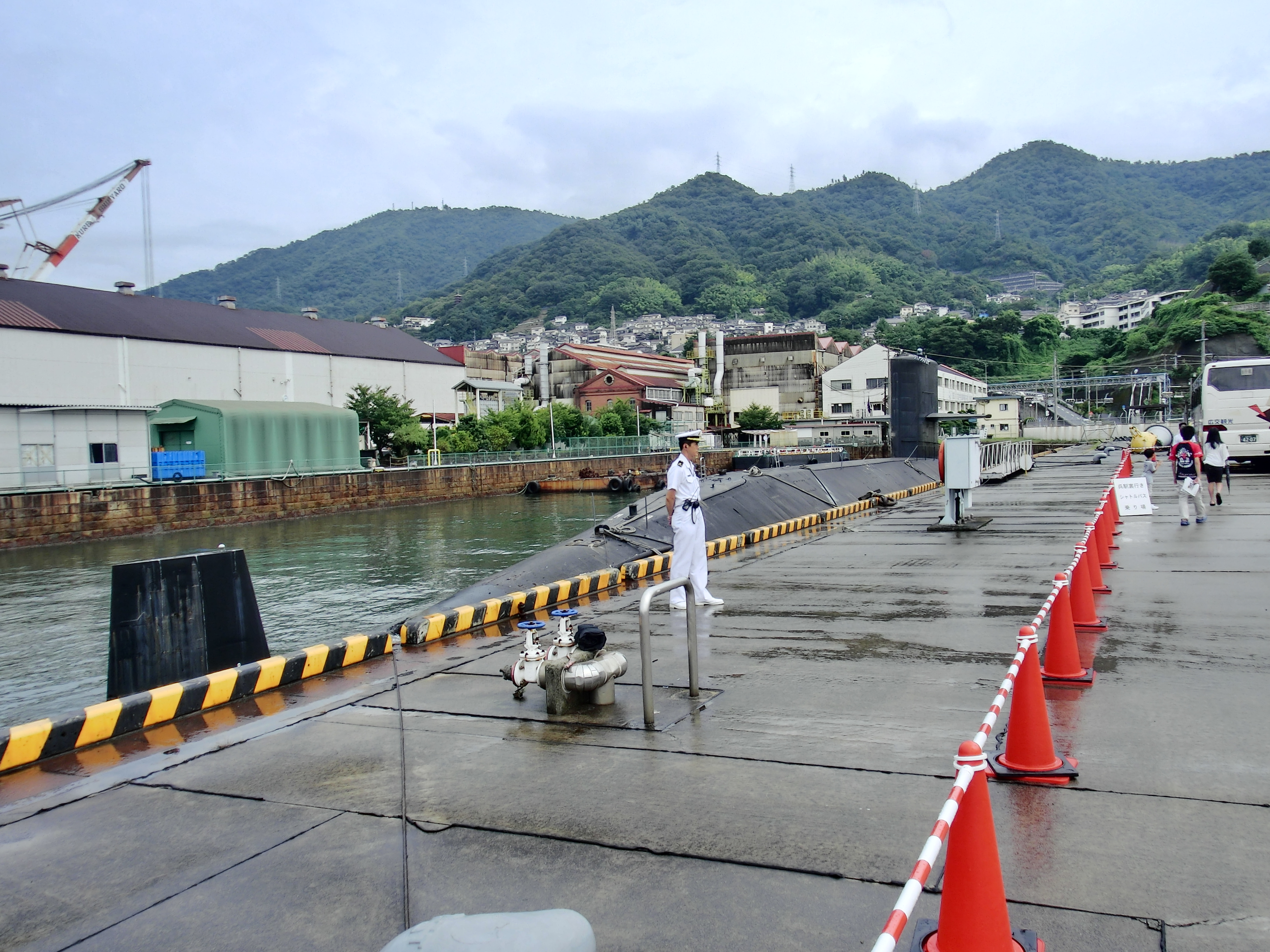
