= List of ship launches in 1992 =

The list of ship launches in 1992 includes a chronological list of all ships launched in 1992.

| Date | Ship | Class / type | Builder | Location | Country | Notes |
|---|---|---|---|---|---|---|
| 4 January | Springfield | Los Angeles-class submarine | Electric Boat | Groton, Connecticut | United States | |
| 10 January | Cape St. George | Ticonderoga-class cruiser | Ingalls Shipbuilding | Pascagoula, Mississippi | United States | |
| 25 January | Regina | Halifax-class frigate | MIL-Davie Shipbuilding | Lauzon, Quebec | Canada | |
| 25 January | Chikuma | Abukuma-class destroyer escort | | | Japan | |
| 2 February | Kapitan Azarkin | Supertrawler | Factorias Vulcano SA | Vigo | Spain | For Dalmoreport Trawlers Ltd, Vladivostok |
| 4 February | Westminster | Type 23 frigate | Swan Hunter | Wallsend | United Kingdom | |
| 6 February | Deltagas | LNG tanker | Appledore Shipbuilders Ltd. | Appledore | United Kingdom | For Deltagas Partenreederei. |
| 6 February | Frankenthal | Frankenthal-class minehunter | Lürssen | | Germany | For German Navy |
| 8 February | Queen of Cumberland | Intermediate-class ferry | Vancouver Shipyards Co. Ltd. | North Vancouver | Canada | |
| 21 February | Newcastle | Adelaide-class frigate | AMECON | Williamstown, Victoria | Australia | |
| 22 February | Zenith | Cruise Ship | Meyer Werft | Papenburg | Germany | For Celebrity Cruises |
| 24 February | Dreamward | Cruise ship | Chantiers de l'Atlantique | Saint-Nazaire | France | For Norwegian Cruise Line |
| 28 February | Montréal | Halifax-class frigate | Saint John Shipbuilding | Saint John, New Brunswick | Canada | |
| 4 March | Vanguard | Vanguard-class submarine | Vickers Shipbuilding and Engineering Ltd | Barrow-in-Furness | United Kingdom | |
| 12 March | Rottweil | Frankenthal-class minehunter | Lürssen | | Germany | For German Navy |
| 14 March | Ventôse | Floréal-class frigate | Chantiers de l'Atlantique | Saint-Nazaire | France | |
| 17 March | Arashio | Harushio-class submarine | | | Japan | |
| 26 March | Kearsarge | Wasp-class amphibious assault ship | Ingalls Shipbuilding | Pascagoula, Mississippi | United States | |
| 3 April | Hampton | Los Angeles-class submarine | Newport News Shipbuilding | Newport News, Virginia | United States | |
| 3 April | Statendam | Rotterdam-class cruise ship | Fincantieri | Monfalcone | Italy | For Holland America Line |
| 4 April | Northumberland | Type 23 frigate | Swan Hunter | Wallsend | United Kingdom | |
| 6 April | Frans Kockum | Cruiseferry | Brodosplit | Split | Croatia | For Sea-Link Shipping. Construction delayed due to the Yugoslav wars, order cancelled. Completed under the name Thomas Mann. |
| 10 April | Rungholt | ferry | Husumer Schiffswerft GmbH | Husum | Germany | For Wyker Dampfschiffs-Reederei Föhr-Amrum GmbH |
| 30 April | Knock Adoon | Suezmax tanker | Harland & Wolff | Belfast | United Kingdom | For Fred Olsen & Co. |
| April | Concordia | Barquentine | Colod | Szczecin | Poland | For West Island College, Montreal. |
| 14 Mai | Weiden | Frankenthal-class minehunter | Abeking & Rasmussen | | Germany | For German Navy |
| 16 May | Curtis Wilbur | Arleigh Burke-class destroyer | Bath Iron Works | Bath, Maine | United States | |
| 16 May | Tippecanoe | Henry J. Kaiser-class replenishment oiler | Avondale Shipyard | Avondale, Louisiana | United States | |
| 26 May | Liselotte Essberger | Sietas type 149 chemical tanker | Schiffswerft J.J. Sietas | Hamburg-Neuenfelde | Germany | For John T. Essberger |
| 31 May | Tarquin Grove | LNG tanker | Appledore Shipbuilders Ltd. | Appledore | United Kingdom | For Liquid Gas Shipping Ltd. |
| 13 June | La Fayette | La Fayette-class frigate | | | France | |
| 13 June | Vella Gulf | Ticonderoga-class cruiser | Ingalls Shipbuilding | Pascagoula, Mississippi | United States | |
| 20 June | Dextrous | Avenger-class mine countermeasures ship | Peterson Shipbuilders | Sturgeon Bay, Wisconsin | United States | |
| 29 June | Atalaya | Serviola-class patrol boat | Navantia | Ferrol | Spain | For Spanish Navy |
| 3 July | Roland Essberger | Sietas type 149 chemical tanker | Schiffswerft J.J. Sietas | Hamburg-Neuenfelde | Germany | For John T. Essberger |
| 20 July | Renaissance Eight | | Nuovi Cantieri Apuania | Marina di Carrara | Italy | |
| 31 July | Montrose | Type 23 frigate | Yarrow Shipbuilders | Glasgow | United Kingdom | |
| 1 August | Columbus | Los Angeles-class submarine | Electric Boat | Groton, Connecticut | United States | |
| 7 August | John August Essberger | Sietas type 149 chemical tanker | Schiffswerft J.J. Sietas | Hamburg-Neuenfelde | Germany | For John T. Essberger |
| 15 August | Nebraska | Ohio-class submarine | Electric Boat | Groton, Connecticut | United States | |
| 20 August | Harald | Firefighting tug | Appledore Shipbuilders Ltd. | Appledore | United Kingdom | For Hambros Leasing (June) Ltd. |
| 23 August | Vendémiaire | Floréal-class frigate | Chantiers de l'Atlantique | Saint-Nazaire | France | |
| 28 August | Calgary | Halifax-class frigate | MIL-Davie Shipbuilding | Lauzon, Quebec | Canada | |
| 28 August | Brandenburg | Brandenburg-class frigate | Blohm + Voss | Hamburg | Germany | For German Navy |
| 14 September | Anette Essberger | Sietas type 149 chemical tanker | Schiffswerft J.J. Sietas | Hamburg-Neuenfelde | Germany | For John T. Essberger |
| 18 September | DSR America | BV 2700-type container ship | Thyssen Nordseewerke | Emden | Germany | |
| 26 September | John S. McCain | Arleigh Burke-class destroyer | Bath Iron Works | Bath, Maine | United States | |
| 3 October | Charlotte | Los Angeles-class submarine | Newport News Shipbuilding | Newport News, Virginia | United States | |
| 10 October | Knock Stocks | Suezmax tanker | Harland & Wolff | Belfast | United Kingdom | For Fred Olsen & Co. |
| 15 October | Cheng Ho | Cheng Kung-class frigate | China Shipbuilding | Kaohsiung | Taiwan | |
| 16 October | Stout | Arleigh Burke-class destroyer | Ingalls Shipbuilding | Pascagoula, Mississippi | United States | |
| 23 October | Navarra | Santa María-class frigate | Bazan | Ferrol | Spain | |
| 27 October | Ouro do Brasi | Ouro do Brasi-class carrier | Kvaerner Keven Florø | | Norway | |
| 14 November | Windward | Cruise ship | Chantiers de l'Atlantique | Saint-Nazaire | France | For Norwegian Cruise Line |
| 20 November | Port Royal | Ticonderoga-class cruiser | Ingalls Shipbuilding | Pascagoula, Mississippi | United States | |
| 27 November | Hamburg Senator | Bonn Express-class container ship | Howaldtswerke-Deutsche Werft | Kiel | Germany | For DSR-Senator keel laid on 23 June 1992; delivered on 1 February 1993 |
| 8 December | Majestic | ferry | Nuovi Cantieri Apunia | Marina di Carrara | Italy | For Grandi Navi Veloci |
| 12 December | Santa Fe | Los Angeles-class submarine | Electric Boat | Groton, Connecticut | United States | |
| Unknown date | Coastal Guardian | Survey ship | David Abels Boatbuilders Ltd. | Bristol | United Kingdom | For Environment Agency. |
| Unknown date | Niagara Queen II | Modified tugboat icebreaker | Hike Metals & Shipbuilding Limited | Wheatley, Ontario | Canada | For Ontario Hydro |
| Unknown date | Two Rivers II | Pilot boat | David Abels Boatbuilders Ltd. | Bristol | United Kingdom | For Torridge District Council. |
| Unknown date | Water Guardian | Survey ship | David Abels Boatbuilders Ltd. | Bristol | United Kingdom | For Environment Agency. |
