= JS Fuyushio =

Harushio-class submarine

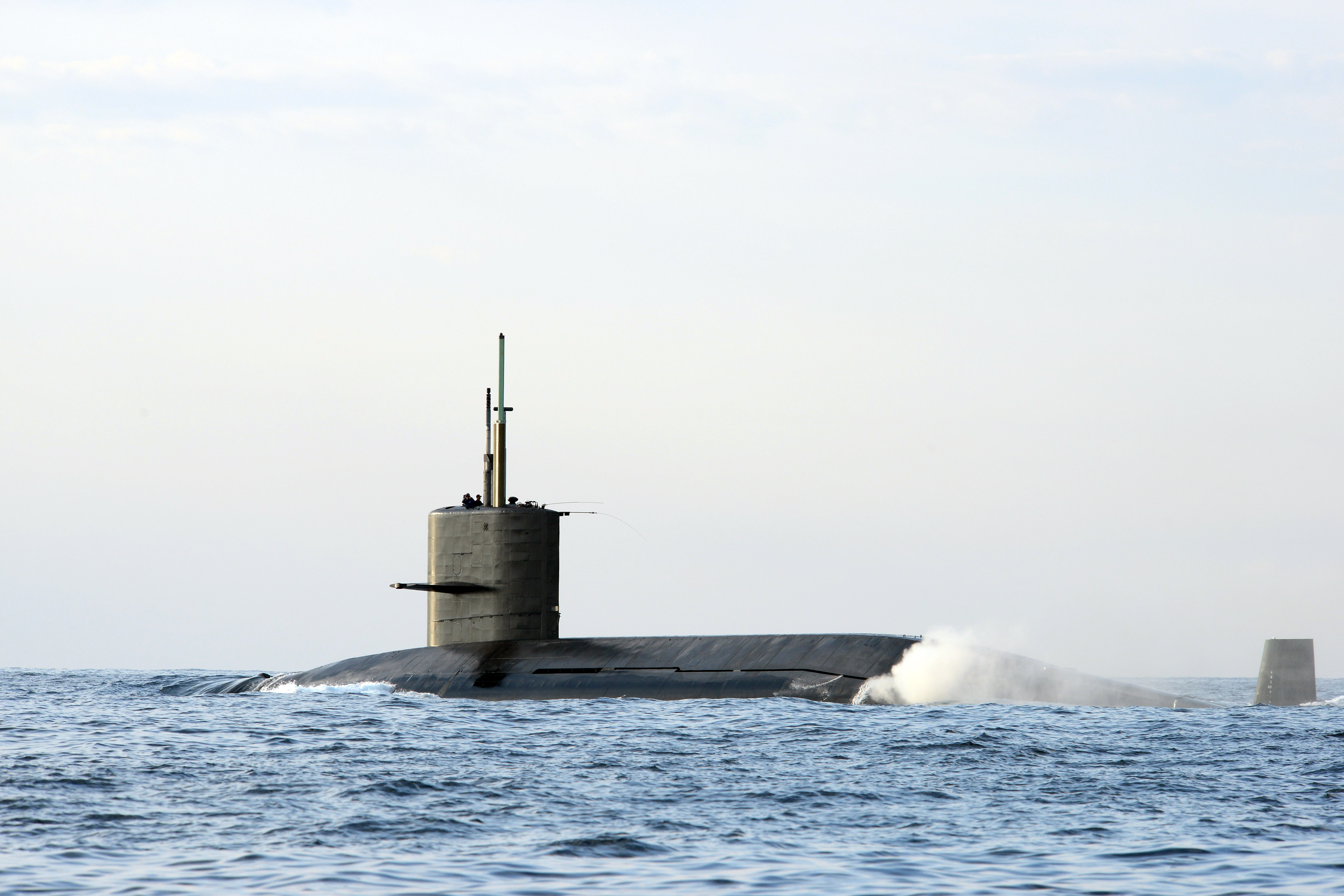
- JS Fuyushio

History

Japan
- Name: Fuyushio; (ふゆしお)
- Ordered: 1990
- Builder: Kawasaki, Kobe
- Laid down: 12 December 1991
- Launched: 16 February 1994
- Commissioned: 7 March 1995
- Decommissioned: 6 March 2015
- Reclassified: TSS-3607
- Home port: Kure
- Identification: Pennant number: SS-587
- Fate: Scrapped, April 2016

General characteristics
- Class & type: Harushio-class submarine
- Displacement: Surface: 2,450 tonnes; Submerged: 3,200 tonnes
- Length: 77.0 m (252 ft 7 in)
- Beam: 10 m (32 ft 10 in)
- Draft: 7.7 m (25 ft 3 in)
- Propulsion: 2 × Kawasaki 12V25/25S diesel electric engines; 2 × shafts
- Speed: Surfaced: 12 kn (22 km/h; 14 mph); Submerged: 20 kn (37 km/h; 23 mph)
- Complement: 75
- Sensors & processing systems: Hughes/Oki ZQQ 5B Sonar; ZQR 1 towed array; JRC ZPS 6 I-band search radar
- Armament: 6 × HU-606 533 mm (21 in) torpedo tubes for: Type 89 torpedo

JS Fuyushio (SS-588) was the sixth ship of the Harushio-class submarines of Japan Maritime Self-Defense Force.

== Development and design ==
This type is a teardrop type ship type, a so-called SSS (Single Screw Submarine) type with a single-axis propulsion system, and the structural style is a complete double-shell structure, following the method since the Uzushio-class submarines (42SS) in the basic design concept. Meanwhile, the type, dual vibration-damping support of the anti-vibration support or main engine of the main motor, the auxiliary equipment and pipe systems, static power supply, and rectification of the hole opening on the bottom of the ship. Through these efforts, it was decided that the masker sound insulation device was unnecessary, and in the latter model of this model, it was so quiet that it would not be detected even if snorkeling was continued until the sonobuoy was visible.

== Construction and career ==
Fuyushio was laid down at Kawasaki Heavy Industries Kobe Shipyard on 12 December 1991 as the 1990 plan 2400-ton submarine No. 8103 and it was launched on 16 February 1994. She was commissioned on 7 March 1995 and homeported in Kure. She belonged to the 1st Submarine of the 6th Submarine Group.

She participated in RIMPAC 1996 from 27 August to 28 November.

On 12 March 1997, the 6th Submarine was renamed the 3rd Submarine due to the revision of the unit numbers.

The commissioning of the Sōryū-class submarine Hakuryū on 15 March 2011 forced Fuyushio to be relegated to training ship role, being redesignated TSS-3607. She was transferred to the 1st training submarine under the direct control of the submarine fleet. At this time, the torpedoes were landed and the torpedo launcher room was renovated by arranging a trainee auditorium.

From 20 to 28 September 2013, Fuyushio participated in the joint military exercise Pacific Reach 2013 sponsored by the Maritime Self-Defense Force.

She was decommissioned on 6 March 2015 and scrapped in Etajima in April 2016.

== Gallery ==
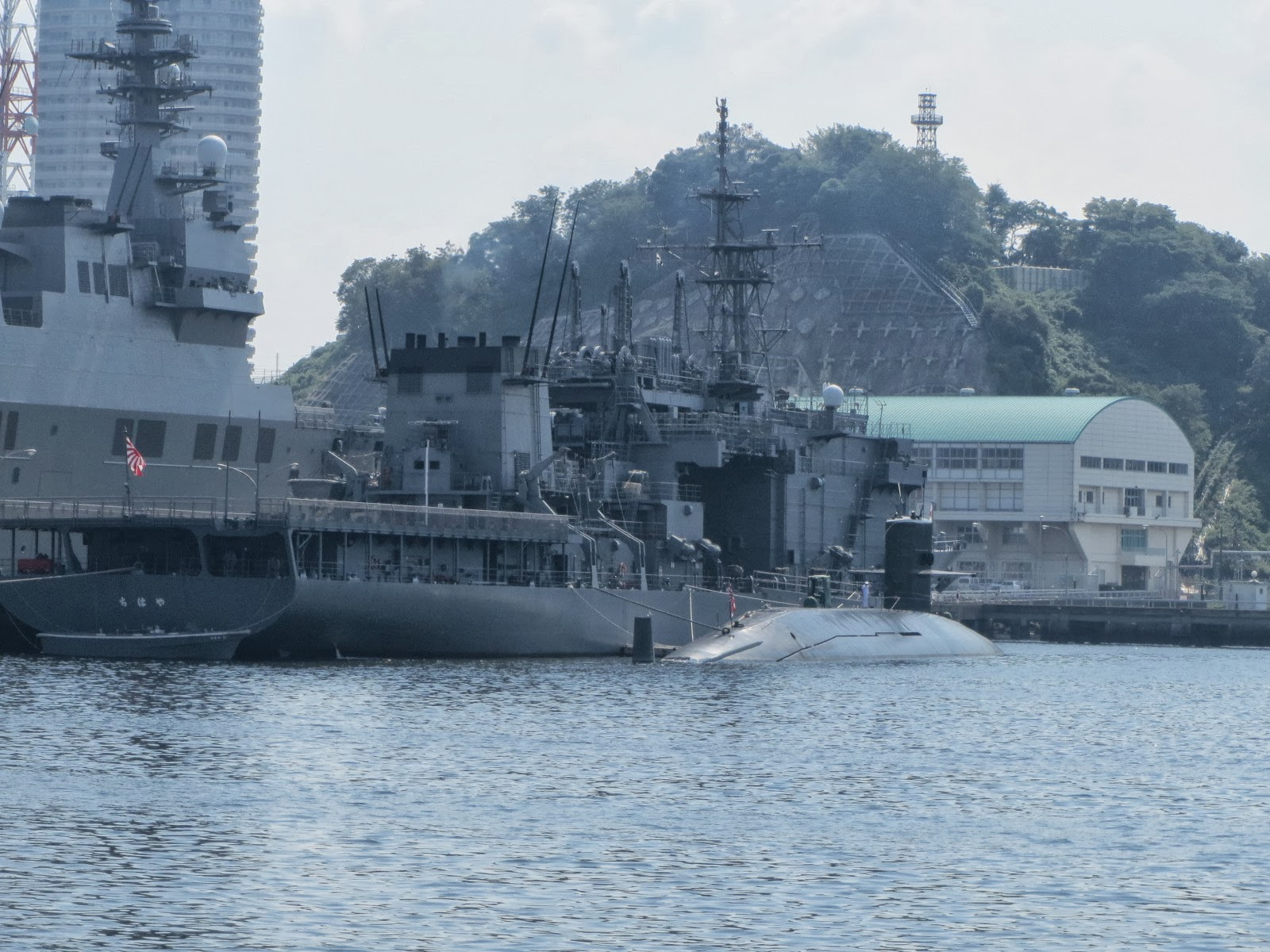
Chihaya and Fuyushio in Yokosuka during Pacific Reach on 22 September 2013
