= JS Arashio =

Harushio-class submarine

History

Japan
- Name: Arashio; (あらしお)
- Ordered: 1989
- Builder: Kawasaki, Kobe
- Laid down: 8 January 1990
- Launched: 17 March 1992
- Commissioned: 17 March 1993
- Decommissioned: 19 March 2012
- Home port: Kure
- Identification: Pennant number: SS-586
- Fate: Scrapped, 18 November 2013

General characteristics
- Class & type: Harushio-class submarine
- Displacement: Surface: 2,450 tonnes; Submerged: 3,200 tonnes
- Length: 77.0 m (252 ft 7 in)
- Beam: 10 m (32 ft 10 in)
- Draft: 7.7 m (25 ft 3 in)
- Propulsion: 2 × Kawasaki 12V25/25S diesel electric engines; 2 × shafts
- Speed: Surfaced: 12 kn (22 km/h; 14 mph); Submerged: 20 kn (37 km/h; 23 mph)
- Complement: 75
- Sensors & processing systems: Hughes/Oki ZQQ 5B Sonar; ZQR 1 towed array; JRC ZPS 6 I-band search radar
- Armament: 6 × HU-606 533 mm (21 in) torpedo tubes for: Type 89 torpedo

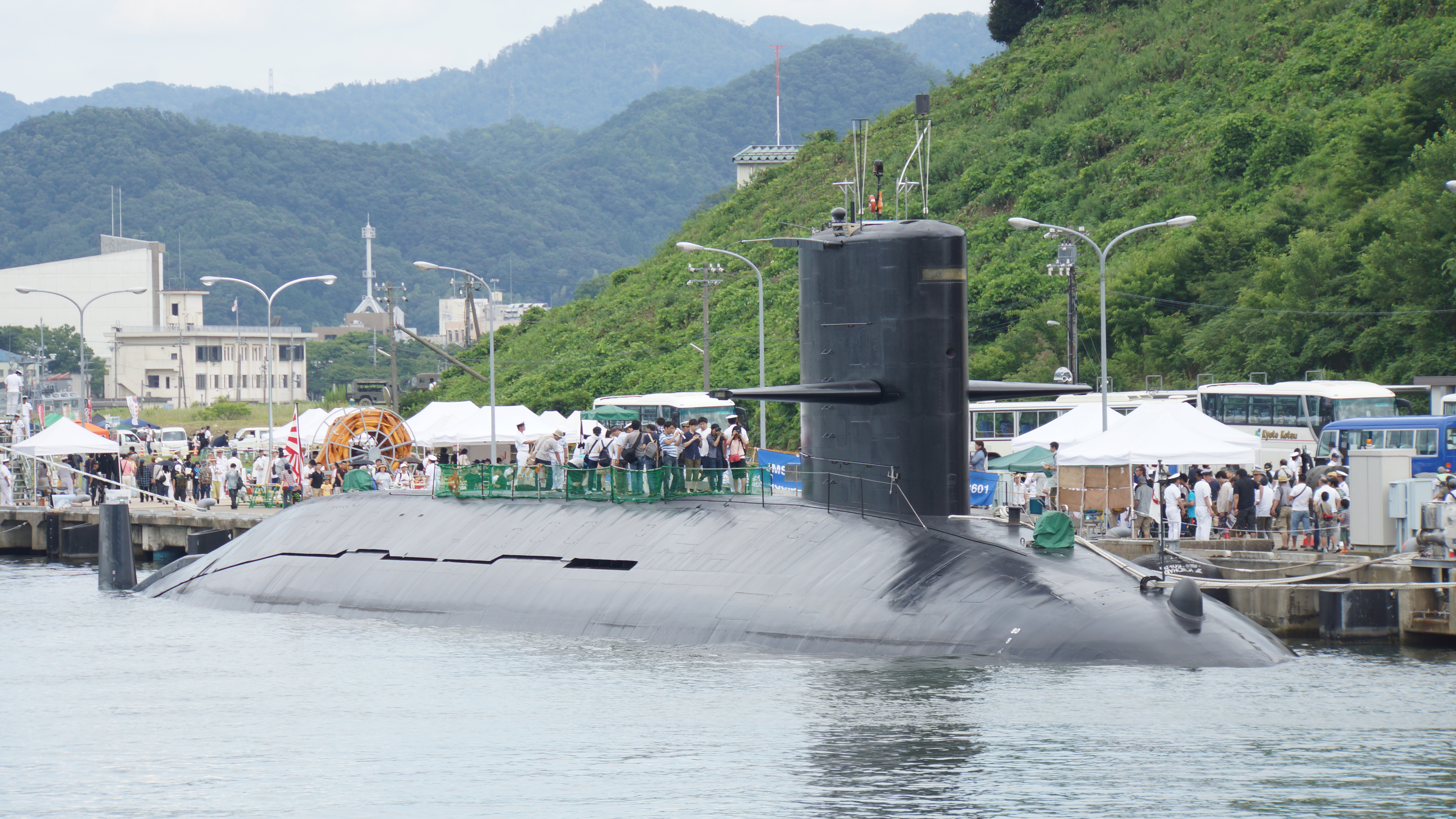
Sister ship Asashio at Maizuru Naval Base on July 16th, 2016

JS Arashio (SS-586) was the fourth ship of the Harushio-class submarine of Japan Maritime Self-Defense Force.

== Development and design ==
This type is a teardrop type ship type, a so-called SSS (Single Screw Submarine) type with a single-axis propulsion system, and the structural style is a complete double-shell structure, following the method since the Uzushio-class (42SS) in the basic design concept. Meanwhile, the type, dual vibration-damping support of the anti-vibration support or main engine of the main motor, the auxiliary equipment and pipe systems, static power supply, and rectification of the hole opening on the bottom of the ship. Through these efforts, it was decided that the masker sound insulation device was unnecessary, and in the latter model of this model, it was so quiet that it would not be detected even if snorkeling was continued until the sonobuoy was visible.

== Construction and career ==
Arashio was laid down at Kawasaki Heavy Industries Kobe Shipyard on 8 January 1990 as the 1989 plan 2400-ton submarine No. 8101 and it was launched on 17 March 1992. She was commissioned on 17 March 1993 and homeported in Kure. She belonged to the 6th Submarine of the 1st Submarine Group.

On 12 March 1997, the 6th Submarine was reorganized to 3rd Submarine due to the revision of the unit number.

On 26 August 1994, she departed Kure for Hawaii to participate in dispatch training by using the US Navy training facility for tactical skill improvement, returning to Kure on 28 November.

From August 17 to 25, 2010, she participated in the 5th Western Pacific Submarine Rescue Training Pacific Reach 2010 in the South China Sea and land-based training in Singapore at Changi Naval Base.

She was decommissioned on 19 March 2012 and scrapped in Dokai Bay, Kyushu on 18 November 2013.
