= JS Asashio (SS-589) =

Harushio-class submarine

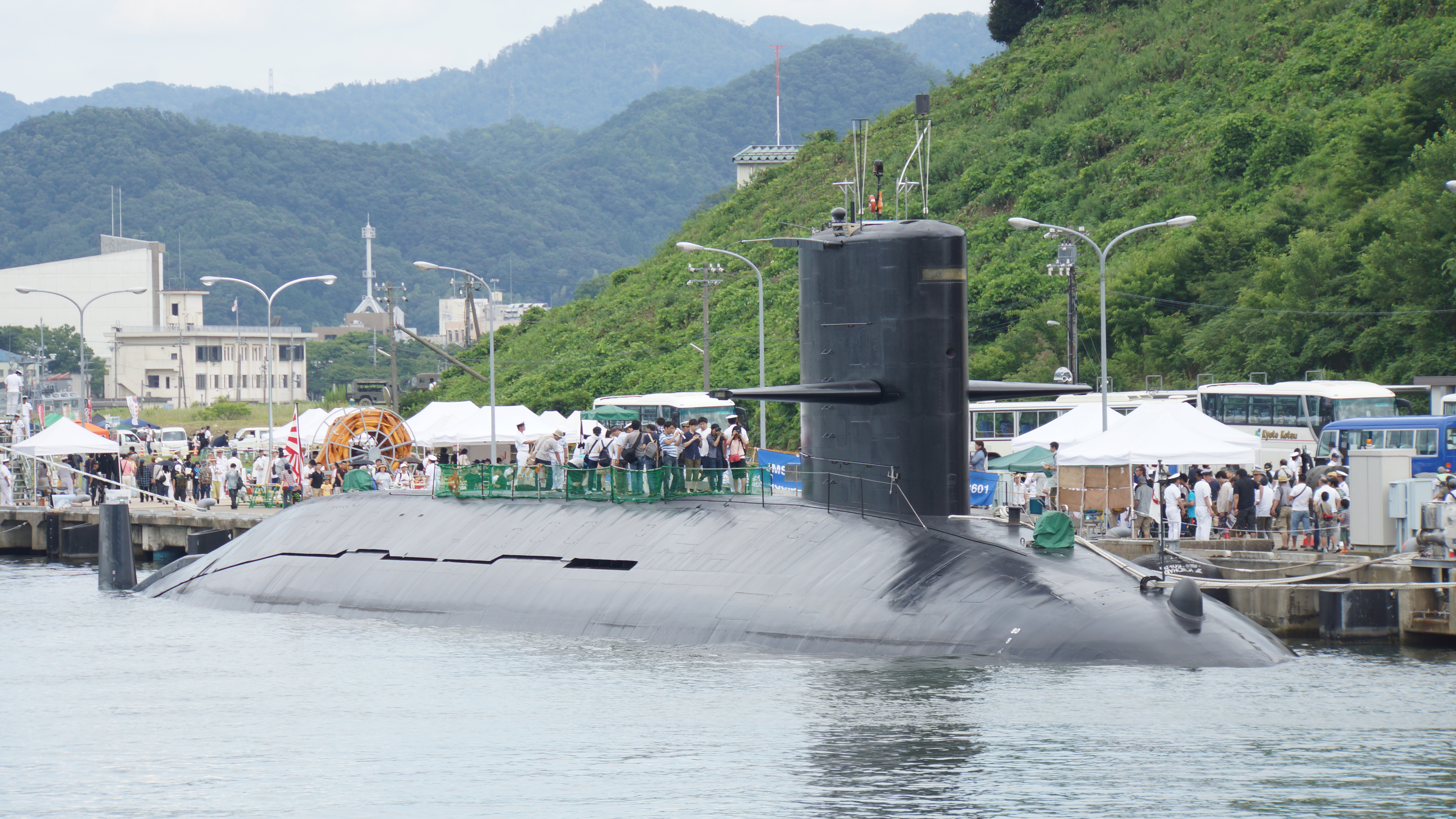
- JS Asashio

History

Japan
- Name: Asashio; (あさしお)
- Namesake: Asashio (1965)
- Ordered: 1992
- Builder: Mitsubishi, Kobe
- Laid down: 24 December 1992
- Launched: 12 July 1995
- Commissioned: 12 March 1997
- Decommissioned: 27 February 2017
- Reclassified: TSS-3601
- Home port: Kure
- Identification: Pennant number: SS-589
- Status: Decommissioned

General characteristics
- Class & type: Harushio-class submarine
- Displacement: Surface: 2,900 tonnes; Submerged: 3,700 tonnes
- Length: 87.0 m (285 ft 5 in)
- Beam: 10 m (32 ft 10 in)
- Draft: 7.7 m (25 ft 3 in)
- Propulsion: 2 × Kawasaki 12V25/25S diesel electric engines; 2 × shafts
- Speed: Surfaced: 12 kn (22 km/h; 14 mph); Submerged: 20 kn (37 km/h; 23 mph)
- Complement: 71
- Sensors & processing systems: Hughes/Oki ZQQ 5B Sonar; ZQR 1 towed array; JRC ZPS 6 I-band search radar; ZYQ-2B
- Armament: 6 × HU-606 533 mm (21 in) torpedo tubes for: Type 89 torpedo

JS Asashio (SS-589) was the seventh ship of the Harushio-class submarine of Japan Maritime Self-Defense Force.

== Development and design ==
This type is a teardrop type ship type, a so-called SSS (Single Screw Submarine) type with a single-axis propulsion system, and the structural style is a complete double-shell structure, following the method since the Uzushio-class (42SS) in the basic design concept . Meanwhile, the type, dual vibration-damping support of the anti-vibration support or main engine of the main motor, the auxiliary equipment and pipe systems, static power supply, and rectification of the hole opening on the bottom of the ship. Through these efforts, it was decided that the masker sound insulation device was unnecessary, and in the latter model of this model, it was so quiet that it would not be detected even if snorkeling was continued until the sonobuoy was visible.

== Construction and career ==
Asashio was laid down at Mitsubishi Heavy Industries Kobe Shipyard on 24 December 1992 as the 1992 plan 2400-ton submarine No. 8104 and it was launched on 12 July 1995. She was commissioned on 12 March 1997 and homeported in Yokosuka. She belonged to the 6th Submarine of the 2nd Submarine Group. Before the launch, he encountered the Great Hanshin-Awaji Earthquake on the slipway.

On 9 March 2000, the type was changed to a training submarine, and the ship registration number was changed to TSS-3601. On the same day, he was transferred to the first practice submarine under the direct control of the submarine fleet, which was newly formed, and transferred to Kure.

30 November 2001, Swedish of Kockums Naval Solutions of license production from the company Sterling-type AIP started the stern extension construction of 9m for mounting at the Mitsubishi Heavy Industries Kobe Shipyard & Machinery Works. As a result, the standard displacement will be 2,900t. 2003 from November Stirling engine test has been carried out .

20 November 2006, she departed Kure and on 21 November, around 7:30 am, Miyazaki Prefecture, water measurement personnel is close to 9:00 am 46 minutes was submerged to a depth 40m to sailing off the coast Detect the ship. 12:49: Spring, a Panama-registered chemical tanker sailing from Chita to China during levitation training at Hyuga-nada (31 ° 37'N / 131 ° 56'E), about 50km east of Aburatsu Port, Nichinan City, Miyazaki Prefecture. The rudder was damaged due to contact with the bottom of the Oster (4,160 tons). The 10th Regional Coast Guard Headquarters sent documents to the Miyazaki District Public Prosecutors Office on suspicion of accidental traffic accidents (the captain was suspended on the 6th, the crew including the patrol chief (1st lieutenant), and the commander of the submarine fleet, a total of 5 people were removed.

She was decommissioned on 27 February 2017. In 20 years of ship history, she sailed about 250,000 miles, which is 11 and a half laps of the earth.

== Gallery ==
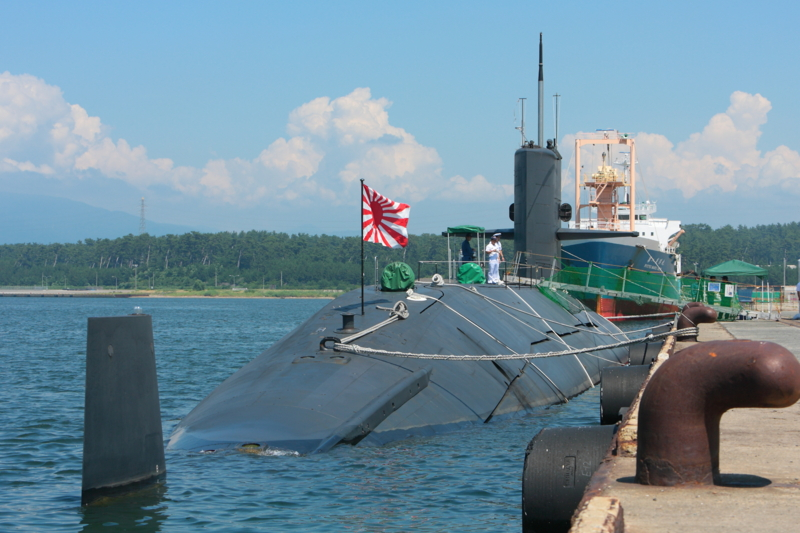
JS Asashio at Port of Sakata on 6 August 2010

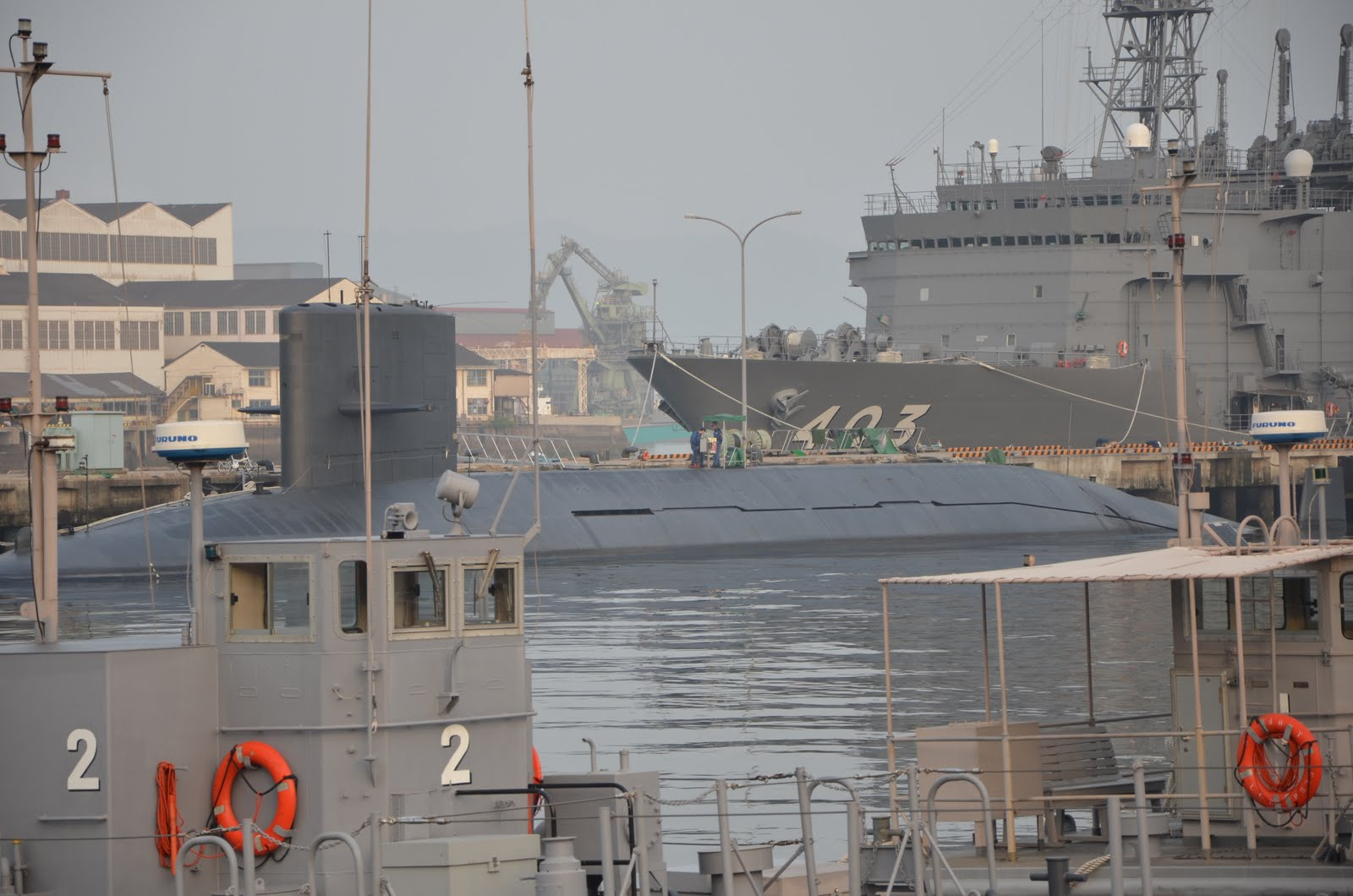
JS Asashio and JS Chihaya at Kure on 3 May 2011

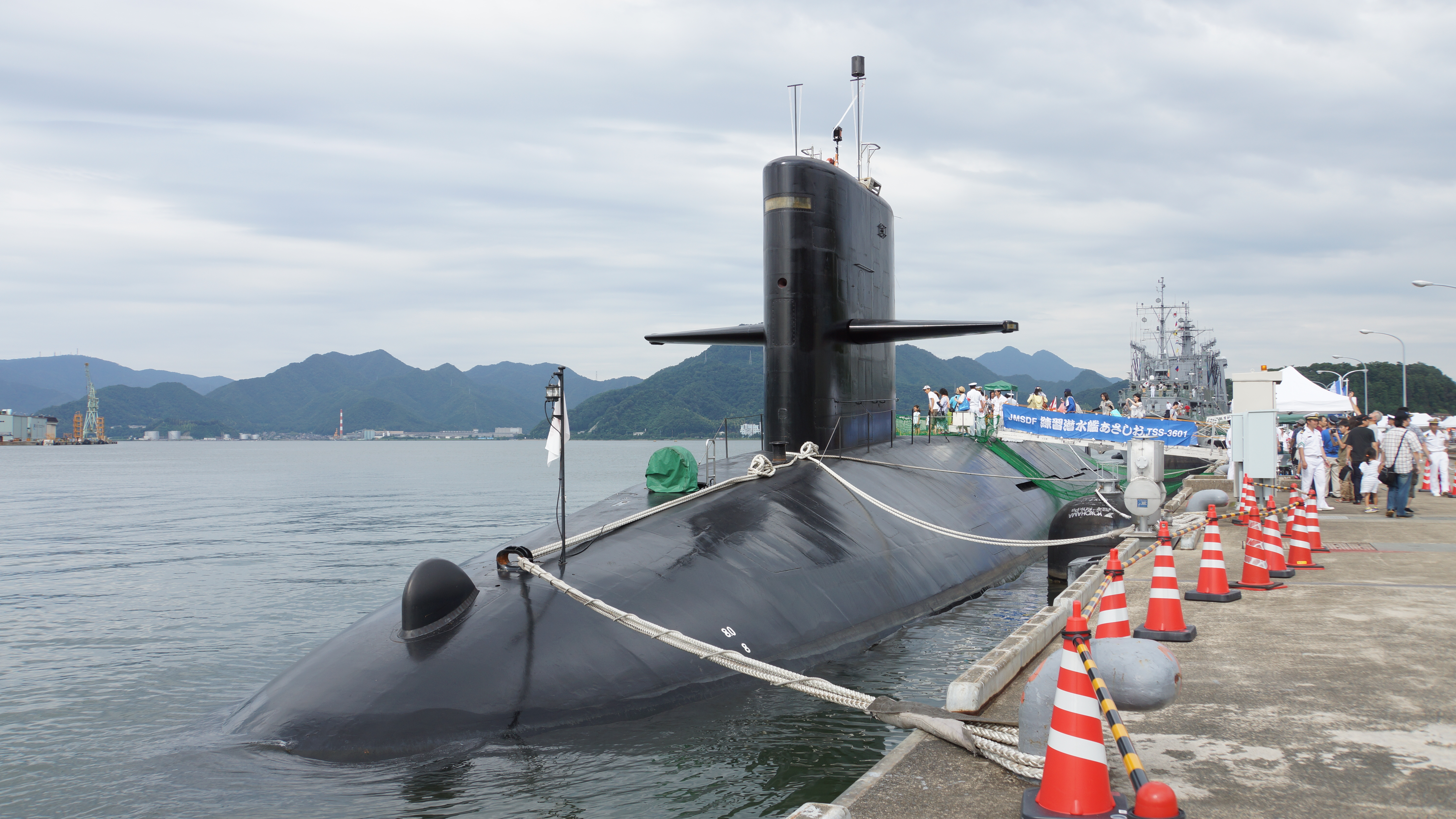
JS Asashio at Maizuru on 16 July 2016

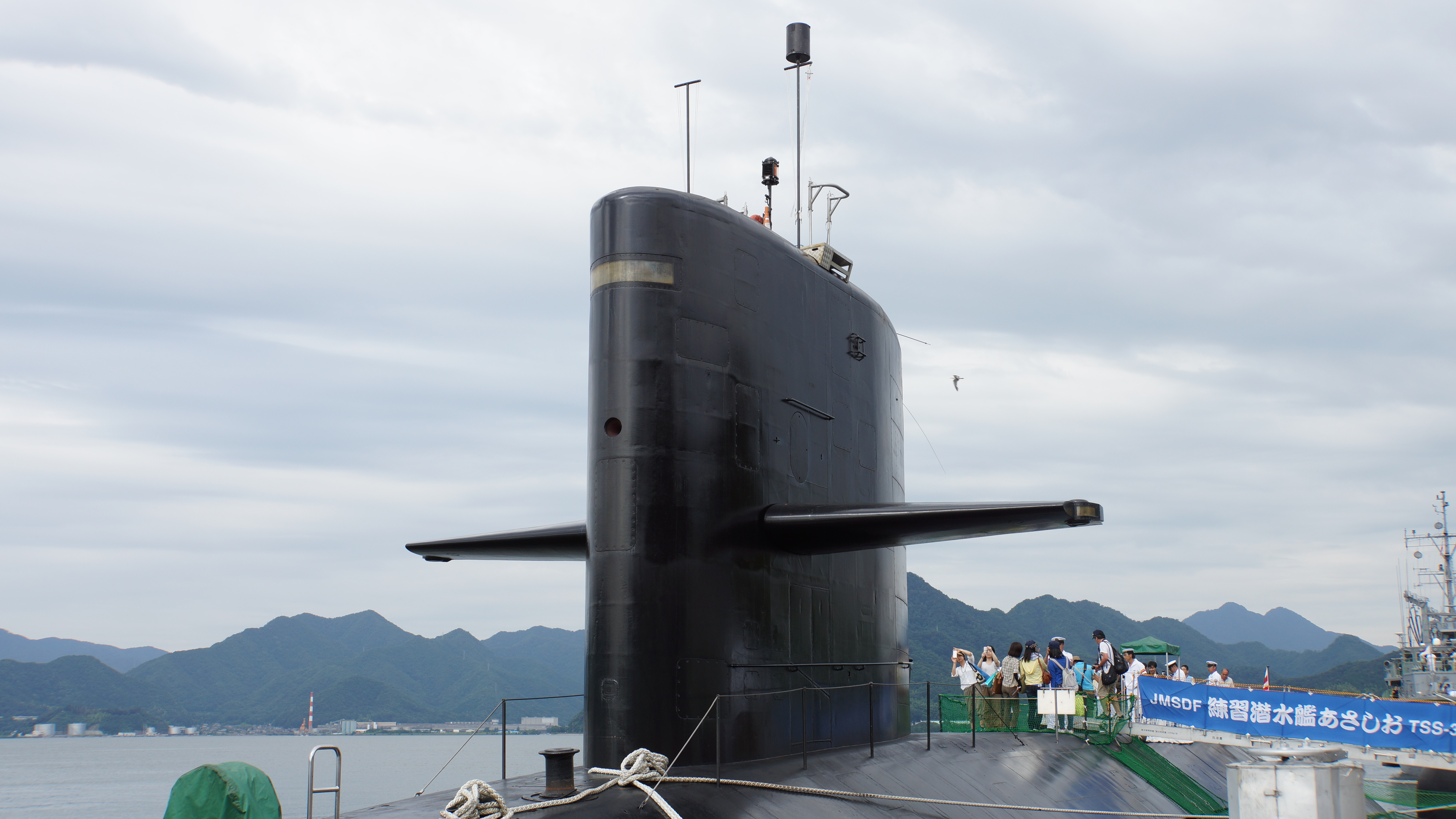

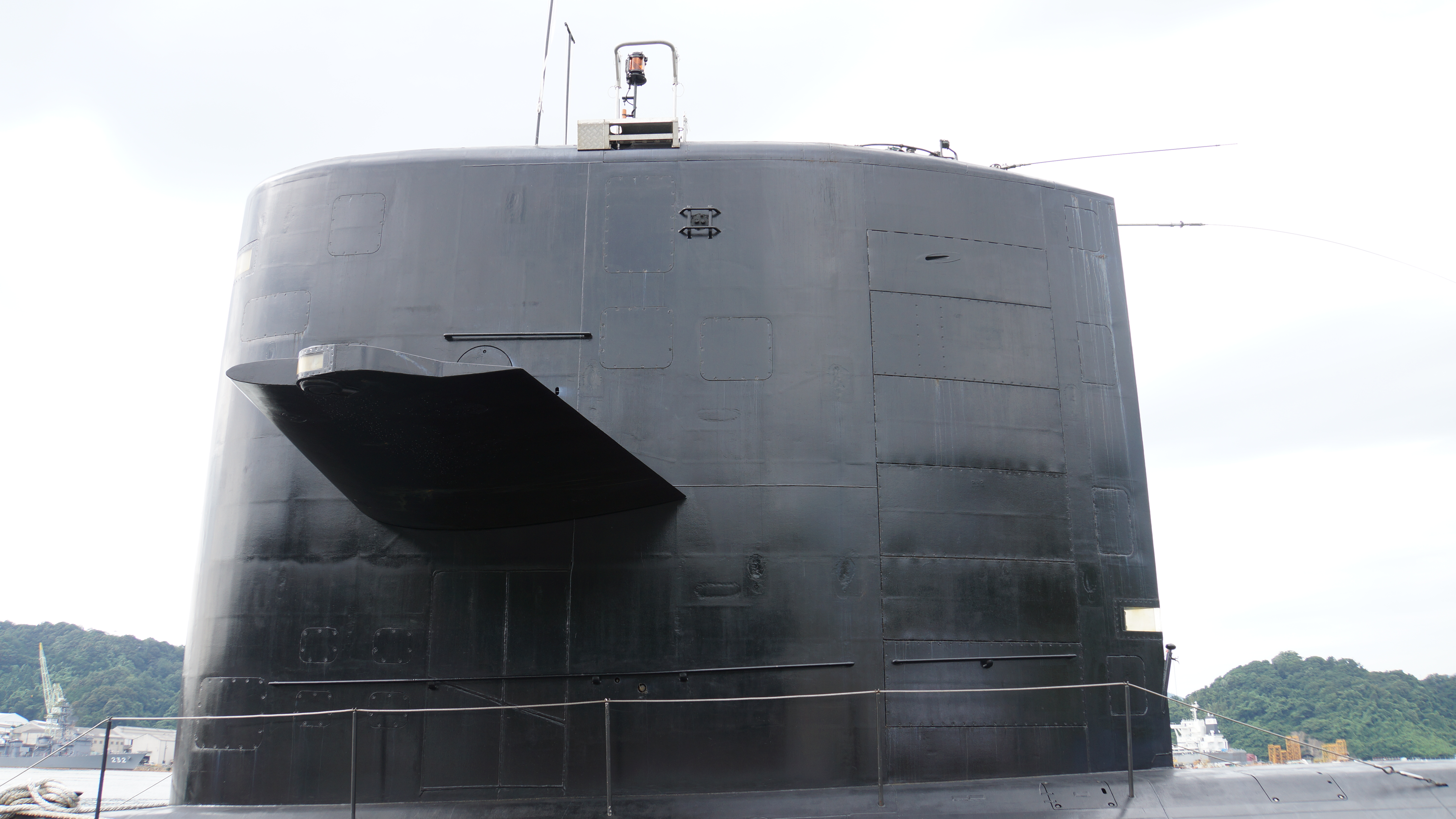

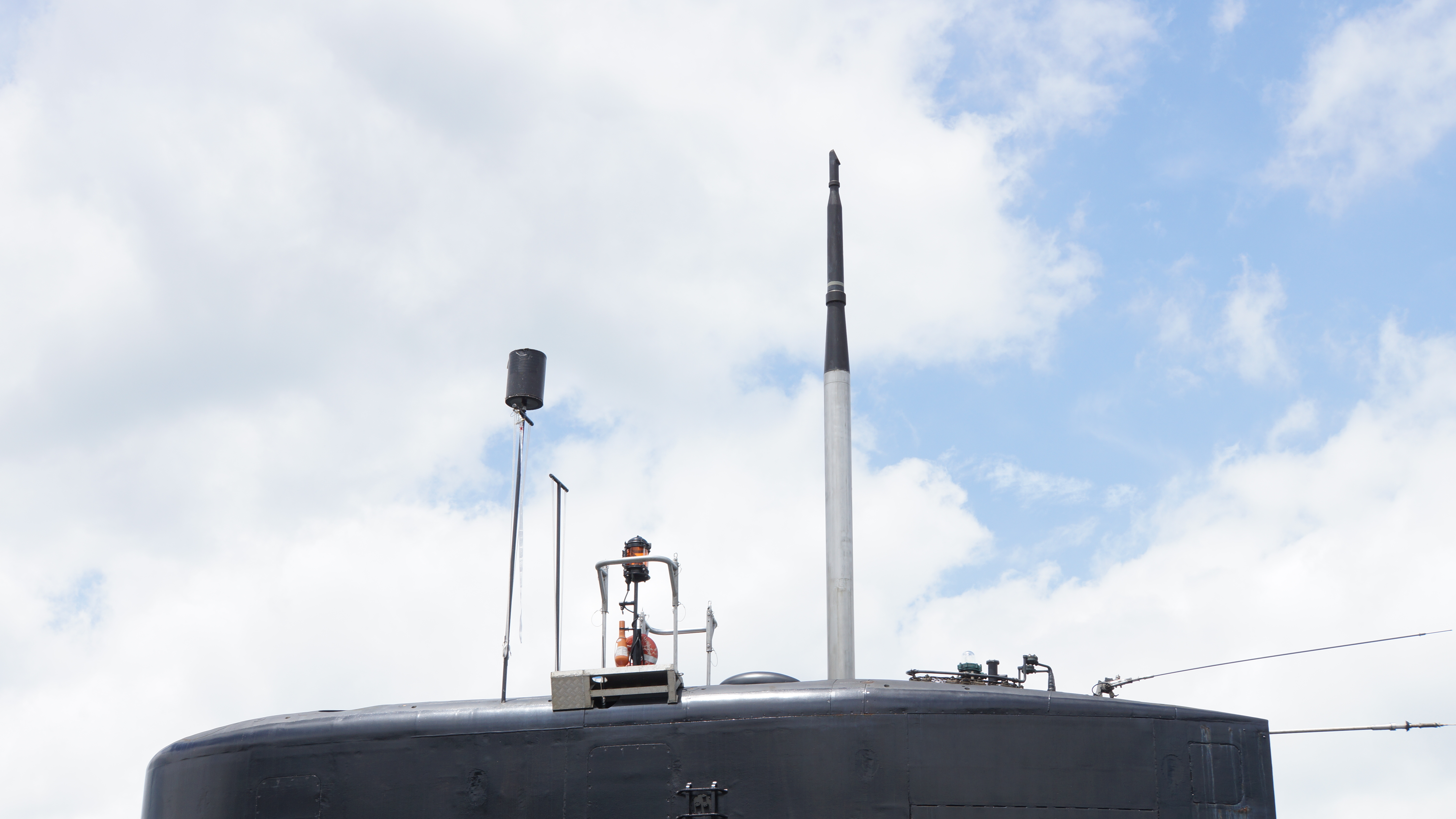

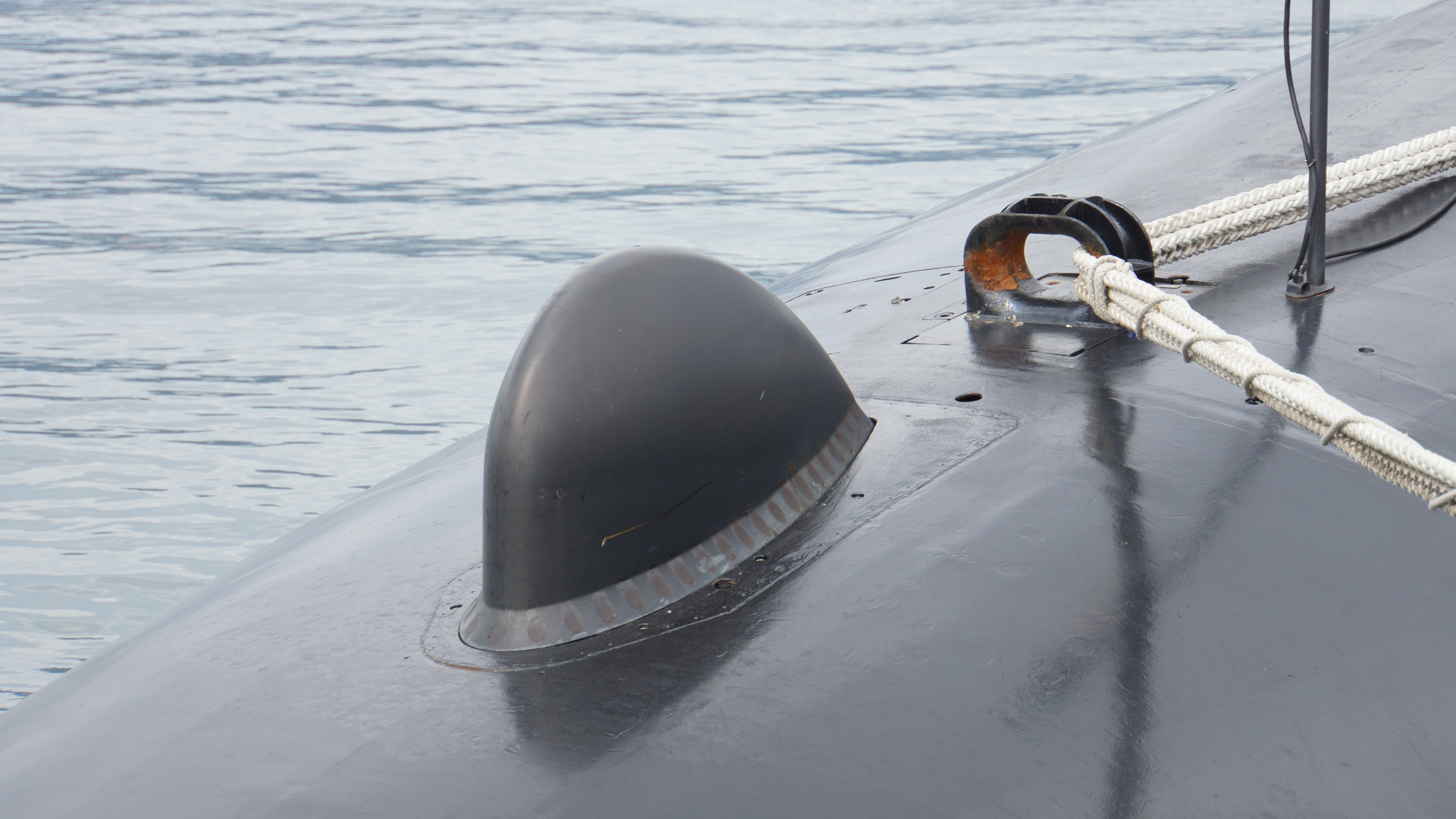

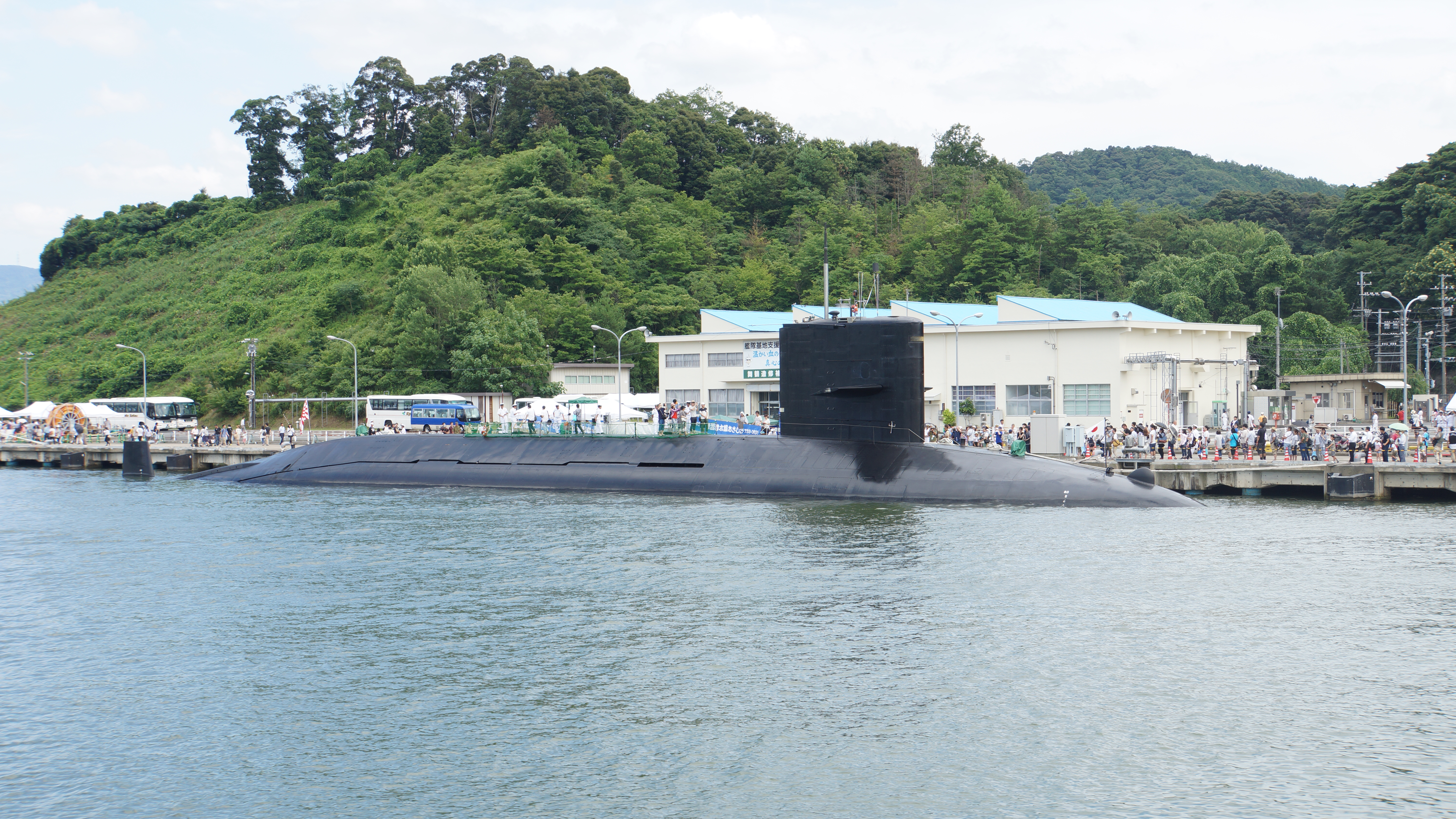

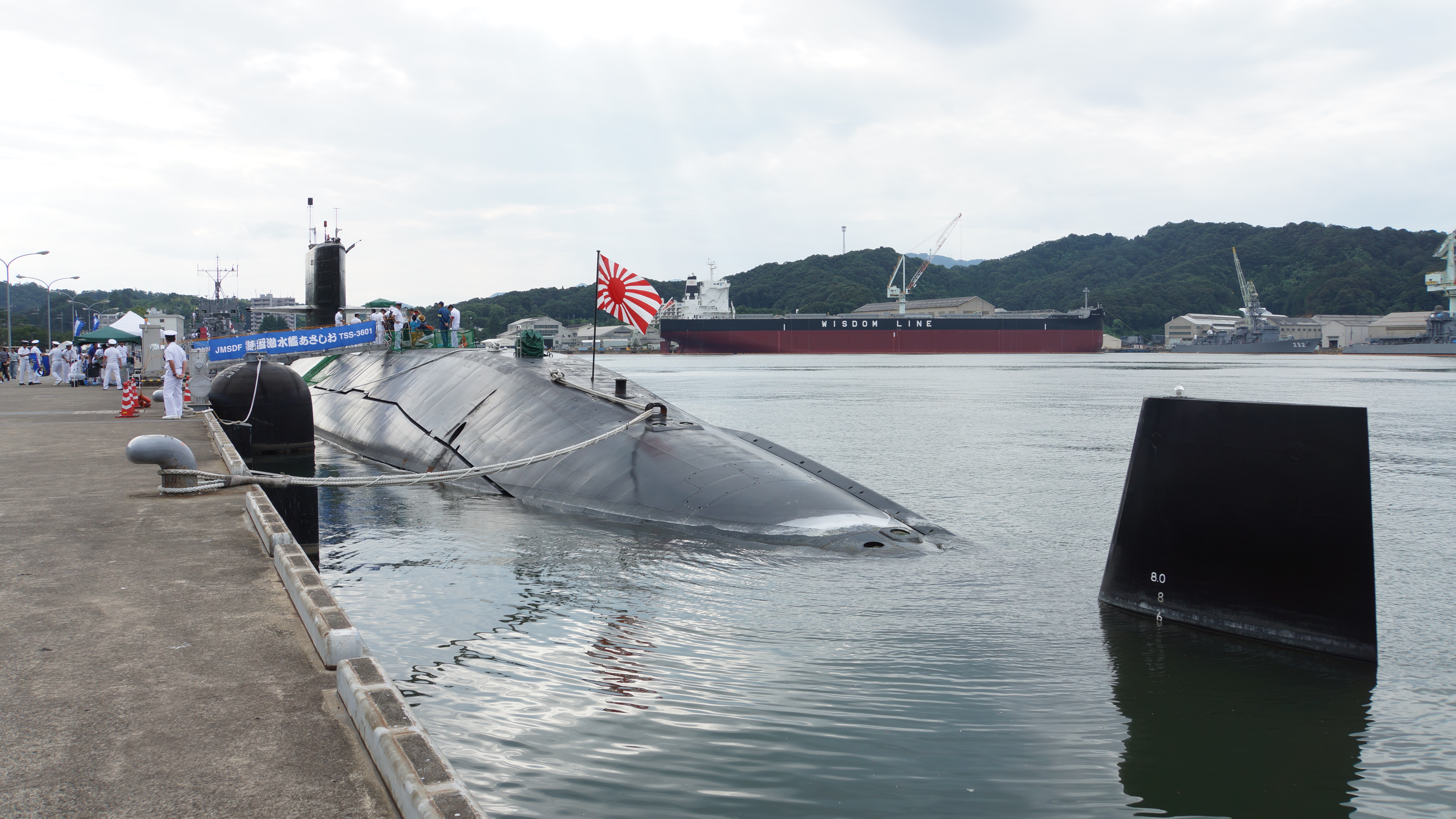

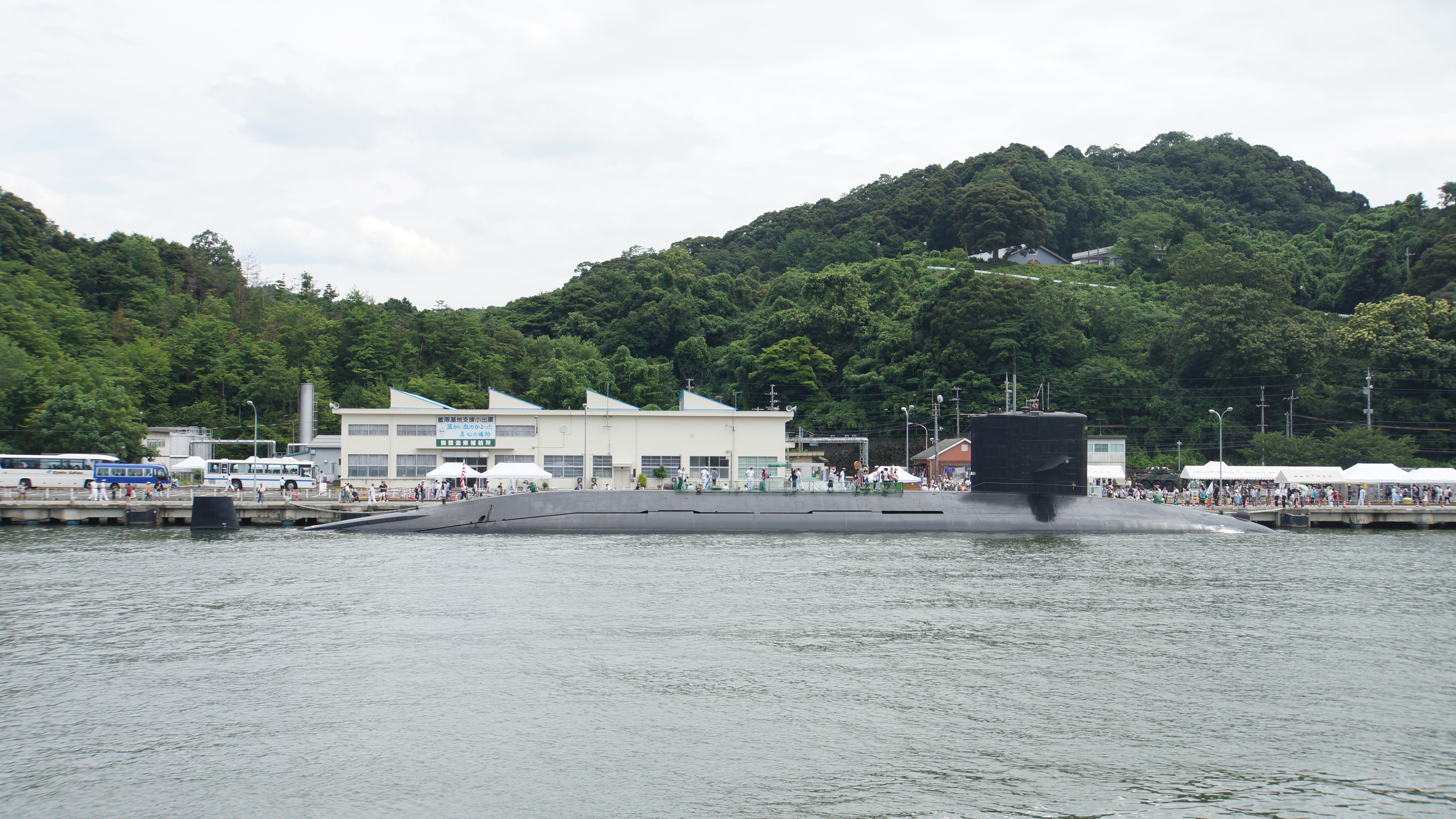

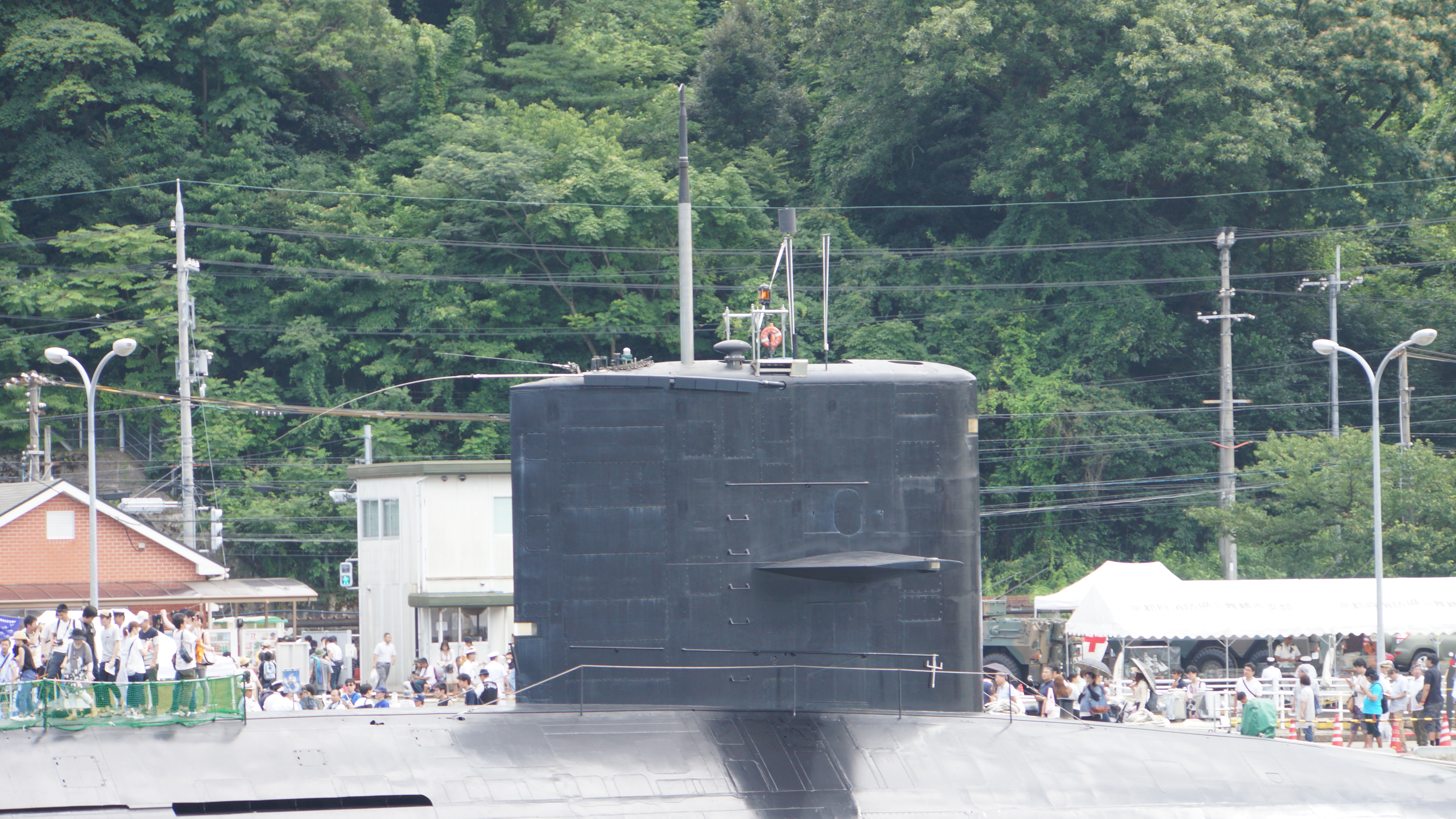
