= Bubble curtain =

System that produces bubbles under water

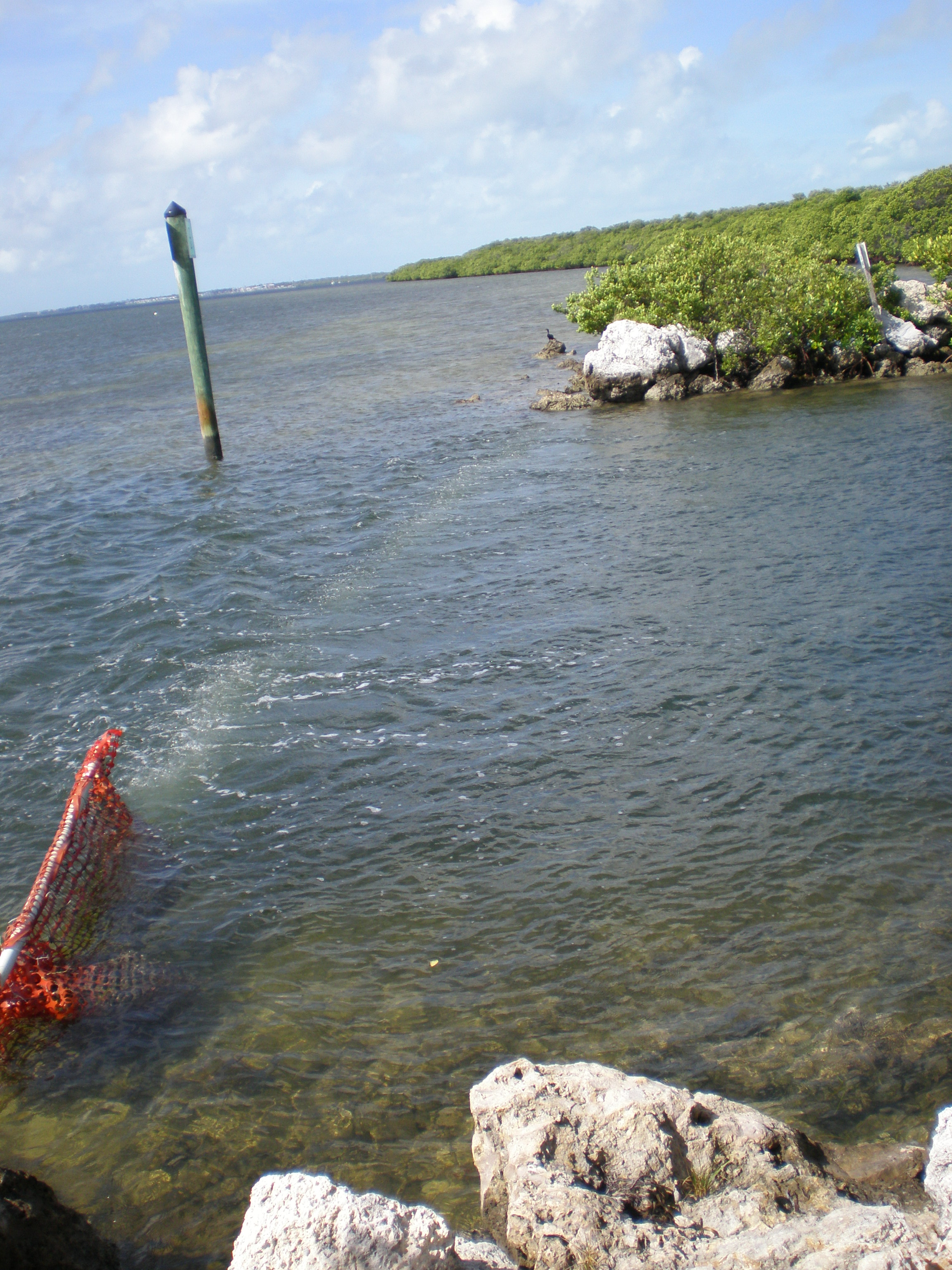
A bubble curtain in Florida used to stop debris entering the marina.

A bubble curtain is a system that produces bubbles in a deliberate arrangement in water. It is also called pneumatic barrier. The technique is based on bubbles of air (gas) being let out under the water surface, commonly on the bottom. When the bubbles rise they act as a barrier, a curtain, breaking the propagation of waves or the spreading of particles and other contaminants.

== Uses ==
It can be used for the following purposes:

- to reduce propagation of shock waves (e.g. acoustic waves from engines or pile driving, explosions et cetera),
- to reduce liquid or debris floating on the surface from spreading,
- to prevent salt intrusion,
- to control the movements of fish,
- for decoration and airing in aquariums.

In June 2010, Okaloosa County, Florida used air bubble curtains to help protect their Destin Pass coastline from oil produced in the Gulf of Mexico by the Deepwater Horizon oil spill. They hoped to push oil up to the surface for booms and skimming boats to collect the oil. British multinational oil company BP, who the U.S. government named as the responsible party for the oil spill, was billed for the cost of the project.

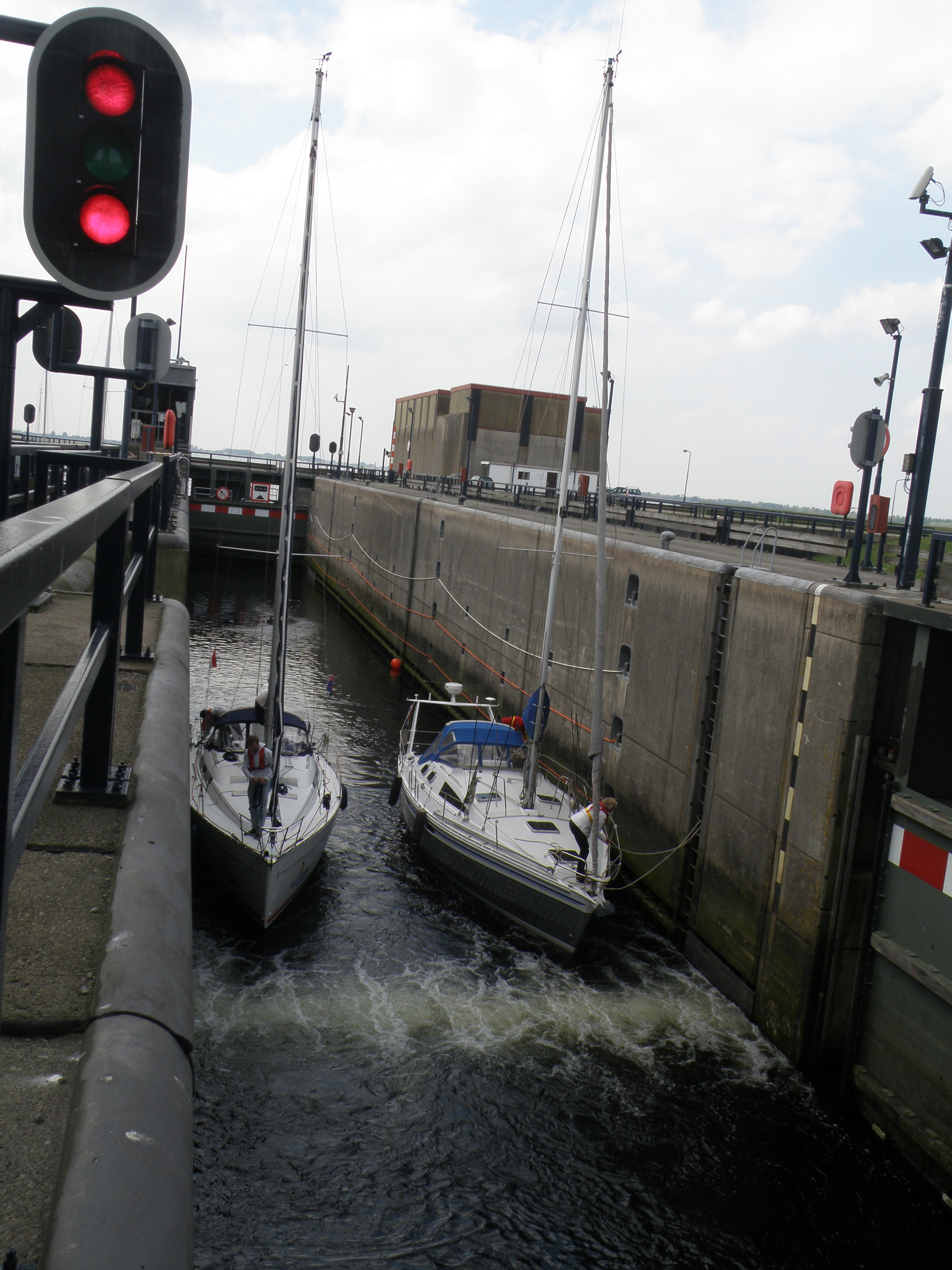
A pneumatic barrier in a navigation lock in the Netherlands

== Equipment ==
The technical system basically consists of a compressor and pipe or hose with nozzles. When used to reduce acoustic waves from pile driving, a distribution manifold made of plastic or rubber is commonly used.

== Offshore pile driving ==
Pile driving in connection to offshore construction, most importantly monopile foundations for offshore wind turbines, produces very high levels of underwater noise, capable of inflicting damage to the hearing of marine organisms and deter animals at tens of km from the construction site. Large-scale bubble curtains are now routinely used to mitigate these impacts as they can attenuate the noise significantly, in particular the higher frequencies, above 1 kHz.

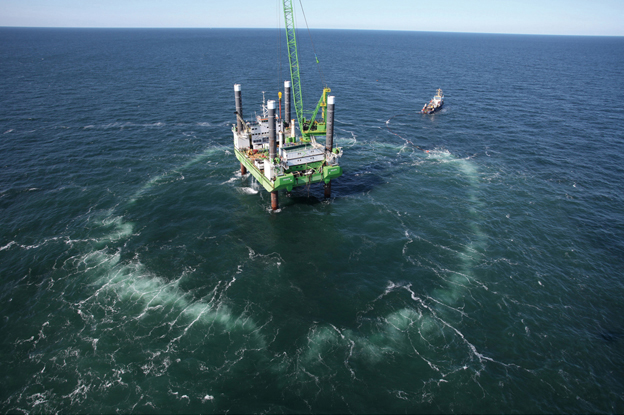
Bubble curtain used during installation of monopiles at the German Borkum West-2 offshore wind farm

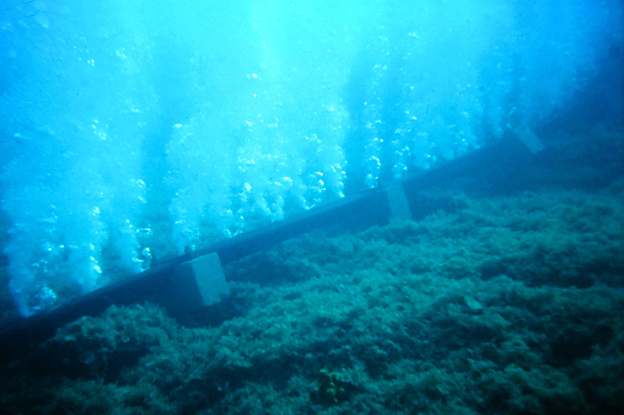
Air hose of prototype of bubble curtain

== See also ==
- Prairie-Masker
- Sonar decoy
