= JS Harushio =

Harushio-class submarine

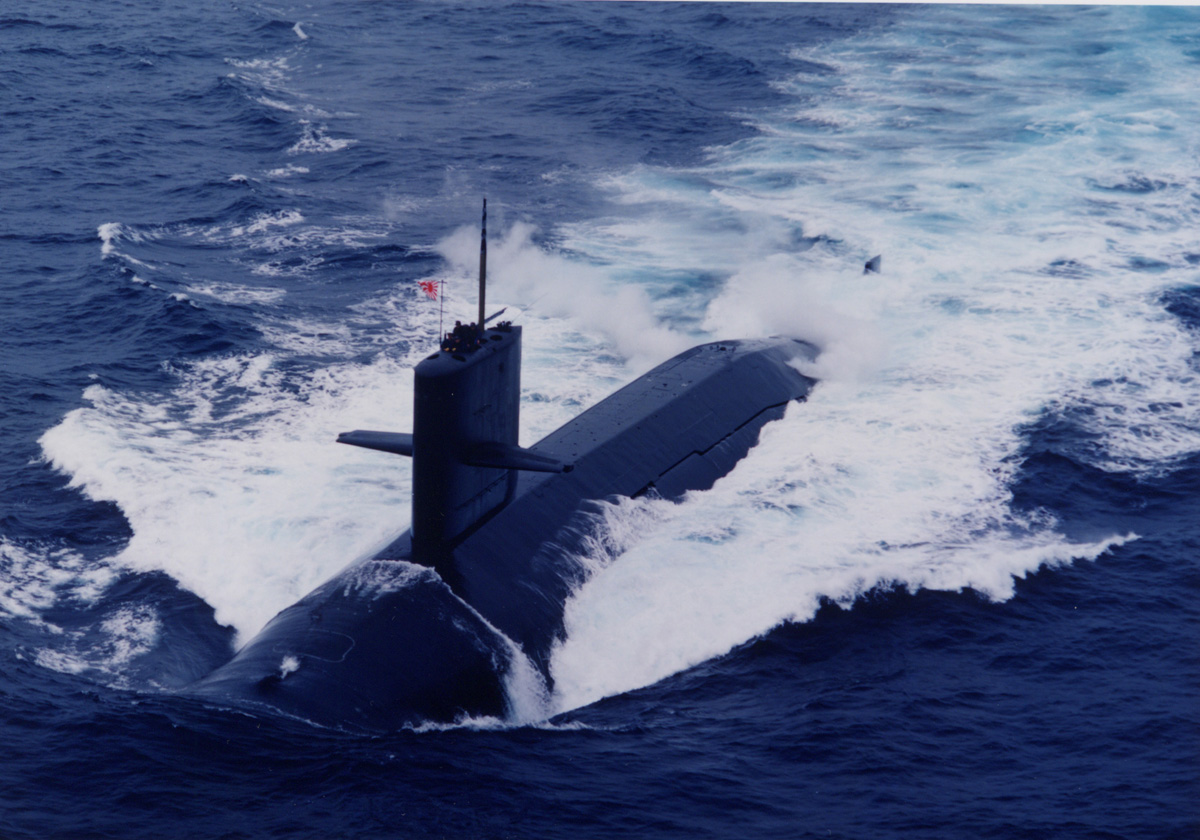
- JDS Harushio

History

Japan
- Name: Harushio; (はるしお)
- Ordered: 1986
- Builder: Mitsubishi, Kobe
- Laid down: 21 April 1987
- Launched: 26 July 1989
- Commissioned: 30 November 1990
- Decommissioned: 27 March 2009
- Home port: Kure
- Identification: Pennant number: SS-583
- Fate: Scrapped, June 2010

General characteristics
- Class & type: Harushio-class submarine
- Displacement: Surface: 2,450 tonnes; Submerged: 3,200 tonnes
- Length: 77.0 m (252 ft 7 in)
- Beam: 10 m (32 ft 10 in)
- Draft: 7.7 m (25 ft 3 in)
- Propulsion: 2 × Kawasaki 12V25/25S diesel electric engines; 2 × shafts
- Speed: Surfaced: 12 kn (22 km/h; 14 mph); Submerged: 20 kn (37 km/h; 23 mph)
- Complement: 75
- Sensors & processing systems: Hughes/Oki ZQQ 5B Sonar; ZQR 1 towed array; JRC ZPS 6 I-band search radar
- Armament: 6 × HU-606 533 mm (21 in) torpedo tubes for: Type 89 torpedo

JS Harushio (SS-583) was the first boat of the Harushio-class submarine of Japan Maritime Self-Defense Force.

== Development and design ==
This type is a teardrop type ship type, a so-called SSS (Single Screw Submarine) type with a single-axis propulsion system, and the structural style is a complete double-shell structure, following the method since the Uzushio-class submarines (42SS) in the basic design concept . Meanwhile, the type, dual vibration-damping support of the anti-vibration support or main engine of the main motor, the auxiliary equipment and pipe systems, static power supply, and rectification of the hole opening on the bottom of the ship. Through these efforts, it was decided that the masker sound insulation device was unnecessary, and in the latter model of this model, it was so quiet that it would not be detected even if snorkeling was continued until the sonobuoy was visible.

== Construction and career ==
Harushio was laid down at Mitsubishi Heavy Industries Kobe Shipyard on 21 April 1987 as the 1986 plan 2400-ton submarine No. 8098 and it was launched on 26 July 1989. She was commissioned on 30 November 1990 and homeported in Kure. She belonged to the 5th Submarine of the 1st Submarine Group.

She was decommissioned on 27 March 2009. The total journey until her removal was 243,000 nautical miles (about 11.2 laps of the earth), her submerged duration was about 27,000 hours, and the number of dives was 603. She also participated in 10 Maritime Self-Defense Force exercises and 8 simulated combat trainings between submarines.
