= Dōkai Bay =

Bay of Japan

Coordinates: 33°53′17″N 130°47′44″E

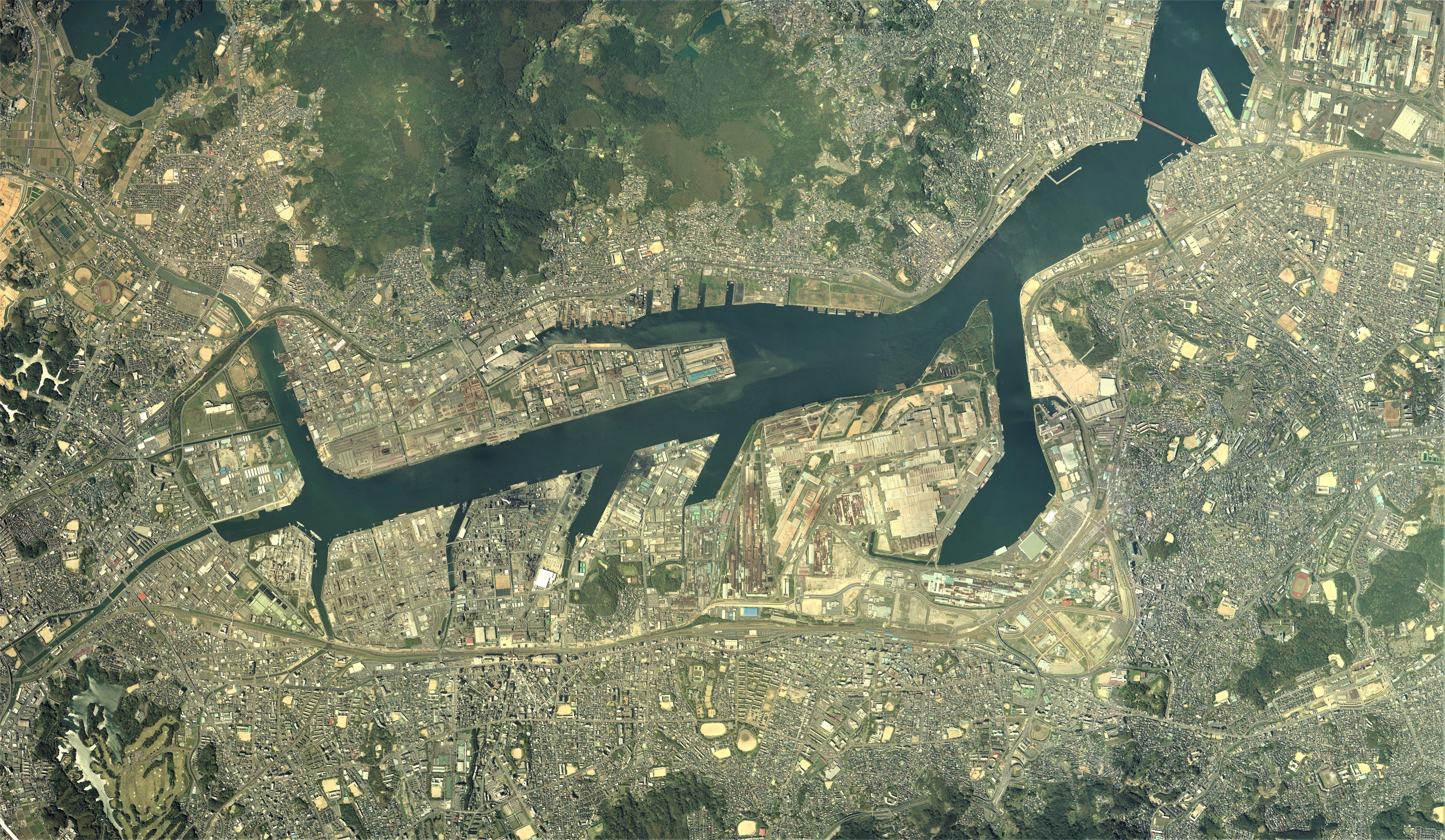
Aerial photograph of Dōkai Bay in 2005

Dōkai Bay (Japanese: 洞海湾, Hepburn: Dōkai Wan), located in Kitakyushu City, Japan, is a long, narrow inland waterway-like bay measuring five to six hundred meters wide and 13 kilometers long. In modern times, it faces heavy industrial areas and once suffered from severe pollution and water contamination, but after a long period of successful purification efforts, the water quality has improved and the ecosystem has recovered.

== Physical geography ==
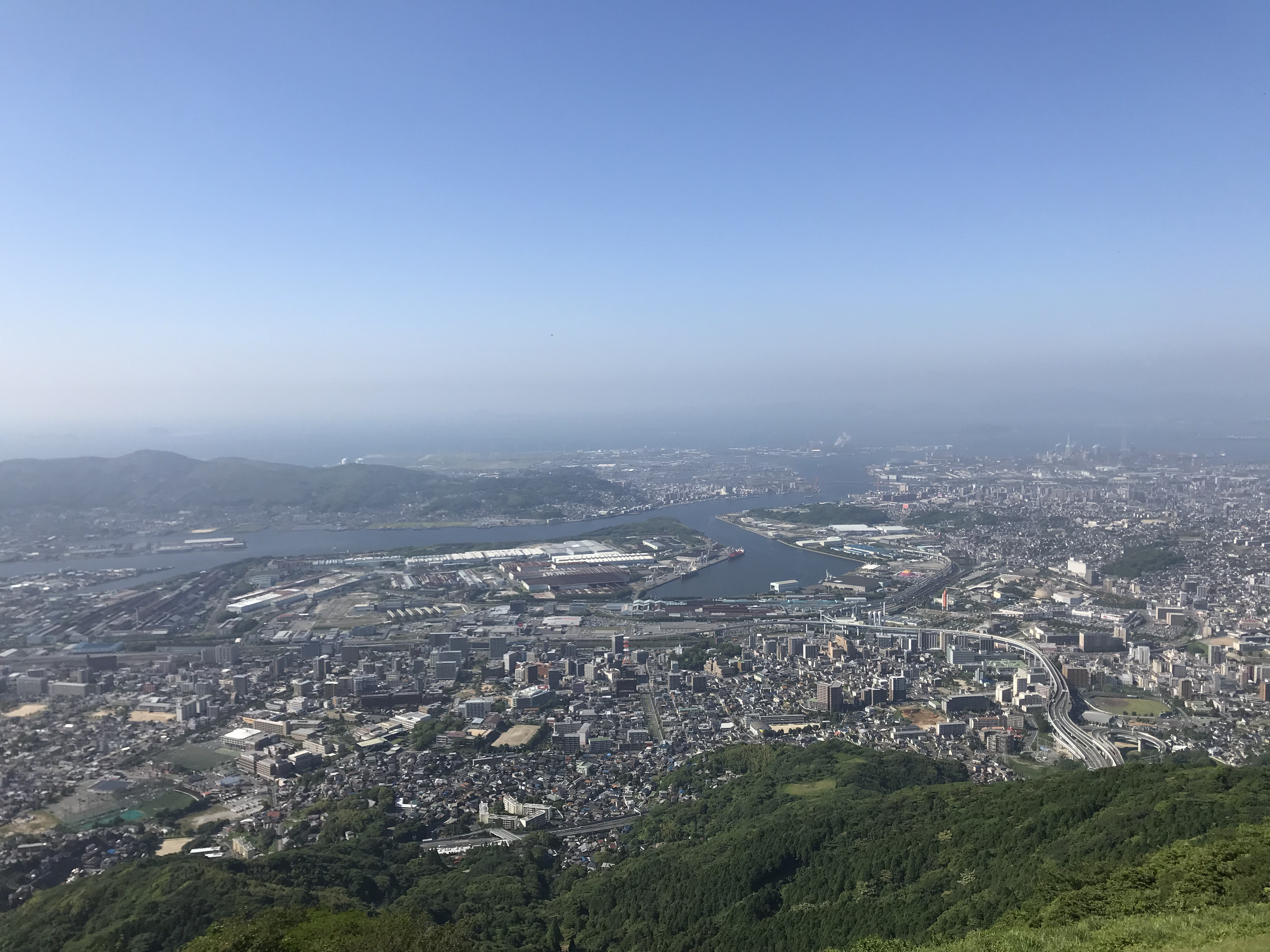
Dōkai Bay as seen from a nearby mountain

Dōkai Bay, located in the northern part of Kyushu island, stretches from the sea (Hibiki Nada) on the east side of the island to the west into the land. It is long and narrow, shaped like waterway, and measures five to six hundred meters wide and 13 kilometers long. The average depth is shallow, about 7 meters.

The formation of Dōkai Bay is closely related to the Quaternary cooling. During the last glacial period, rivers formed a valley here.

There are rivers that flow into the bay, including Egawa River, but they are all small and they all flow into the bay at the innermost point of the bay.

The flow pattern of water masses in Dōkai Bay is a typical estuarine circulation. Throughout the year, the predominant current in the surface layer is toward the mouth of the bay, while the predominant current in the bottom layer is toward the interior of the bay. The surface water in the inner bay does not mix vertically, but flows along the surface and flushes out of the bay within two or two and a half days.

== Flora and fauna ==
Dōkai Bay was a tidal flat several thousand years ago, and was home to many shellfish and other creatures suited to the tidal flat environment. By historic times the bay had become deeper and was known for its abundant shrimp.

In modern times the bay became a coal shipping port. The bay was lined with factories, and wastewater from these factories caused the bay to become severely polluted. In the 1960s, the bay was so polluted that it was called the "Dead Sea," because no fish could live there. After that, the government strengthened its anti-pollution measures, and Japan's industrial structure changed. As a result, the bay has recovered to the point where it is home to more than 100 species of fish and shellfish as of the 2020s.
