= Harushio-class submarine =

Japanese diesel-electric submarine

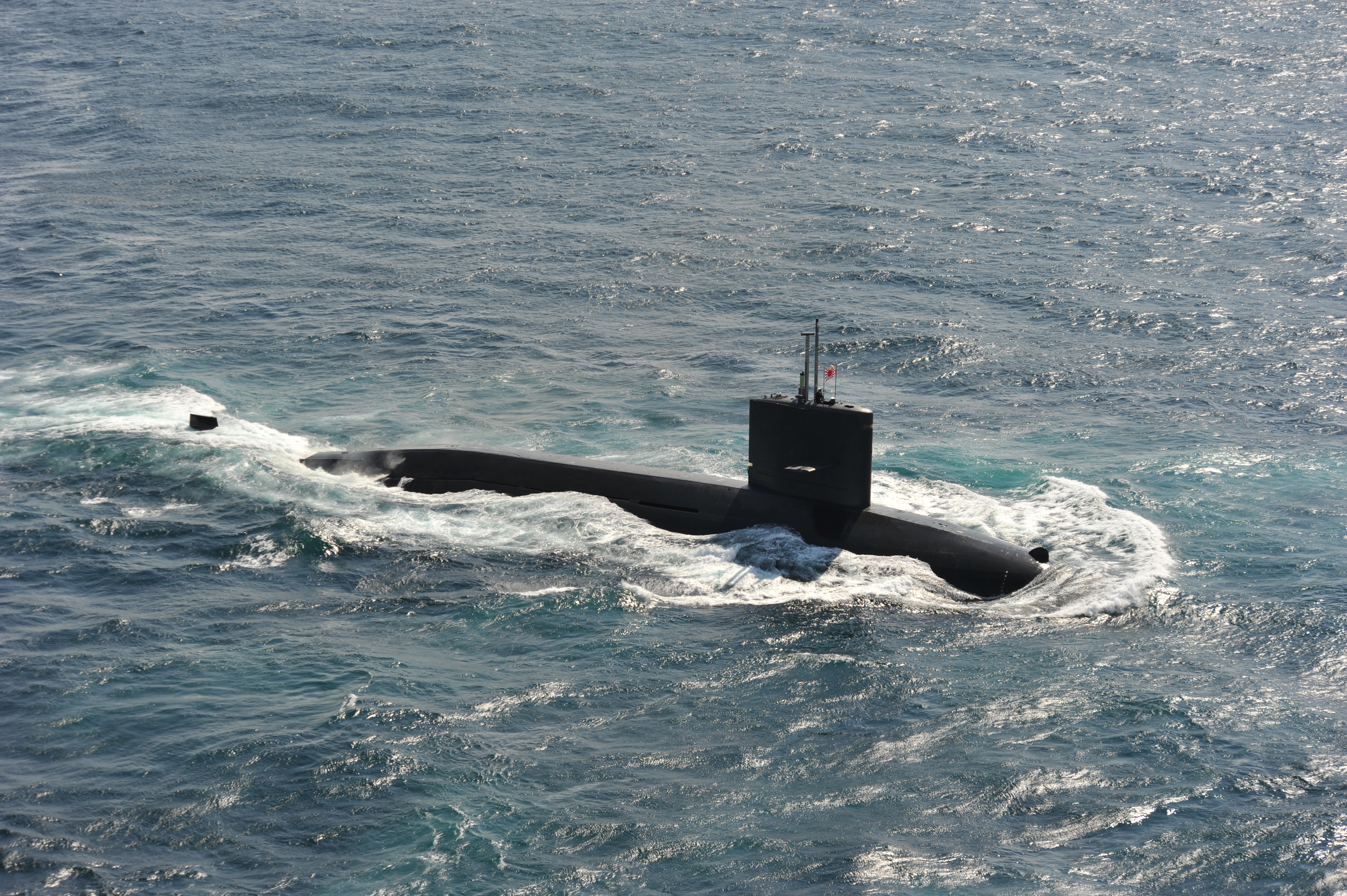
- Wakashio, a Harushio-class submarine

Class overview
- Name: Harushio class
- Builders: Mitsubishi Heavy Industries, Kawasaki Shipbuilding Corporation
- Operators: Japan Maritime Self-Defense Force
- Preceded by: Yūshio class
- Succeeded by: Oyashio class
- Subclasses: Harushio; Asashio
- Built: 1987–1997
- In commission: 1990–2017
- Completed: 7
- Retired: 7

General characteristics as built
- Type: Submarine
- Displacement: 2,450 t (2,410 long tons) (surfaced); 3,200 t (3,100 long tons) (submerged)
- Length: 77.4 m (253 ft 11 in)
- Beam: 10.5 m (34 ft 5 in)
- Draught: 7.7 m (25 ft 3 in)
- Propulsion: 1-shaft diesel-electric; 3,400 bhp (2,500 kW) (surfaced); 7,200 shp (5,400 kW) (submerged)
- Speed: 12 knots (22 km/h; 14 mph) (surfaced); 20 knots (37 km/h; 23 mph) (submerged)
- Complement: 75
- Sensors & processing systems: ZQQ 5B hull-mounted sonar; ZQR 1 towed array; ZPS 6 I-band search radar
- Armament: 6 × 533 mm (21 in) torpedo tubes with 20 reloads for: Type 89 torpedo; UGM-84 Harpoon

The Harushio class (はるしお, "Spring Tide") is a diesel-electric submarine class that was operated by the Japanese Maritime Self-Defense Force (JMSDF). The design is an evolution from the Yūshio class being slightly larger and with better noise reduction. Asashio, was modified to test air-independent propulsion (AIP), and the remaining vessels were decommissioned and replaced by the Oyashio class

== Design and description ==
The Harushio class were designed to replace the ageing Uzushio class and were an improved version of the preceding Yūshio class, being slightly larger, with improved noise reduction, weaponry and sensors. Using a double hull system, the pressure hull was made of NS 110 steel and allowed the submarines to dive to a reported depth of 550 metres (1,800 ft). Their hulls were covered in an anechoic coating to reduce their noise signature.

As built, the vessels measured 77.4 m (253 ft 11 in) long with a beam of 10.5 m (34 ft 5 in) and a draught of 7.7 m (25 ft 3 in). (Note: Both Grove & Scheina and Sharpe have the submarines measuring 77 m (252 ft 7 in) long with a beam of 10 m (32 ft 10 in).) They had a surfaced displacement of 2,450 tonnes (2,410 long tons) and 2,750 t (2,710 long tons) submerged. The submarines, powered by a diesel-electric system, initially mounted two Kawasaki 12V5/255 diesel engines that operated the one shaft while surfaced, creating 5,520 horsepower (4,120 kW). While submerged, the submarines utilised the two Kawasaki alternators connected to the two 480-cell battery sets driving the shaft, creating 7,200 hp (5,400 kW). These were later swapped for two Mitsubishi-MAN V8/v24-30 MATL diesel engines creating 1,750 bhp (1,300 kW) each and two 1,850 kW (2,480 hp) alternators paired with two tandem Toshiba electric motors creating 7,220 shp (5,380 kW). On the surface, the ships were capable of 12 knots (22 km/h; 14 mph) and 20 knots (37 km/h; 23 mph) while dived.

The Harushio class mounted six 533-millimetre (21 in) Type HU-0603B torpedo tubes amidships that could be used to fire either Type 89 torpedoes or UGM-84C Harpoon anti-ship missiles. The submarines carried 20 reloads. The vessels had a complement of 75, composed of 65 enlisted personnel and 10 officers. The final submarine of the class, Asashio, had a reduced crew from launch due to increased automation in the engineering control systems, which comprised 71, including ten officers.

The class was equipped with flank-mounted sonars, namely the Hughes-Oki ZQQ-5B active/passive model. They were also equipped with the ZQR-1 TASS towed passive sonar array. They received the ZLA-7 electronic warfare intercept suite and the ZLR 3-6 electronic support measures suite and had a VHF receiver with a towed antenna. The submarines mounted the JRC ZPS-6 navigation/surface search radar that operated on the I-band.

=== Asashio ===
As the final submarine of the class, Asashio was a modified version of the initial design. Due to the aforementioned increased automation, the submarine was marginally longer than the other submarines of the class, measuring 255.9 m (839 ft 7 in) long overall with an increased surfaced displacement of 2,560 t (2,520 long tons) and 2,850 t (2,800 long tons) dived. Asashio was later selected to be the test bed for air-independent propulsion (AIP) for the Japanese submarine fleet and had an 85 kW (114 hp) Sterling V4-275R Mk II AIP unit installed. To accommodate the AIP system, the submarine's hull was further extended by 9.6 m (31 ft 6 in) and the vessel's displacement increased by roughly 400 t (390 long tons) to 2,900 t (2,900 long tons) standard and 3,200 t (3,100 long tons) submerged.

== Vessels ==
Project no.	Building no.	Pennant no.	Name	Laid down	Launched	Commissioned	Decommissioned
S126	8098	SS-583	Harushio (はるしお)	21 April 1987	26 July 1989	30 November 1990	27 March 2009
S126	8099	SS-584	Natsushio (なつしお)	8 April 1988	20 March 1990	20 March 1991	26 March 2010
S126	8100	SS-585/ TSS-3606	Hayashio (はやしお)	9 December 1988	17 January 1991	25 March 1992	15 March 2011
S126	8101	SS-586	Arashio (あらしお)	8 January 1990	17 March 1992	17 March 1993	19 March 2012
S126	8102	SS-587	Wakashio (わかしお)	12 December 1990	22 January 1993	1 March 1994	5 March 2013
S126	8103	SS-588/ TSS-3607	Fuyushio (ふゆしお)	12 December 1991	16 February 1994	7 March 1995	6 March 2015
S129	8104	SS-589/ TSS-3601	Asashio (あさしお)	24 December 1992	12 July 1995	12 March 1997	27 February 2017

== Construction and career ==
The first submarine of the class was authorised in 1986 and one per year until 1992. Asashio was reclassified as a training submarine on 9 March 2000. After undergoing conversion to AIP, Asashio re-entered service on 30 November. Hayashio was reclassified as a training submarine in 2008.

== See also ==
Equivalent submarines of the same era

- Sindhughosh class
- Santa Cruz class
- Hai Lung class
- Walrus class
- Kilo class
- Upholder/Victoria class
