= Prairie-Masker =

Radiated noise reduction system fitted to some western warships

Prairie-Masker is a radiated noise reduction system fitted to some western warships, including the Oliver Hazard Perry-class frigates, Spruance and Arleigh Burke-class destroyers, and the Ticonderoga-class cruisers of the US Navy. The system was also installed during the 1960s on a limited number of post WWII Guppy III modified, and later diesel submarines.

The Masker and Prairie systems are designed to prevent the classification or identification of a warship's acoustic signature by another vessel, i.e. by a hostile submarine. Instead of hearing machinery, the ship sounds similar to rain on passive sonar to hostile sonar operators. The Masker portion of the system is installed onto the hull of a vessel, usually near its machinery spaces. The Prairie portion of the system is designed to silence the vessel's propellers. Originally classified top secret, these systems are now used by several countries as part of their antisubmarine warfare systems.

== Background ==
Ship silencing is an important part of reducing unwanted noise, which can severely limit a naval vessel's active and passive undersea warfare capability and decrease the range or probability of detection by an unfriendly vessel. The US Navy maintains a Ship Silencing Program to address these problems. The goals of the Ship Silencing Program are a reduction of sonar self noise over the frequency range of passive capable sonar and the reduction in the ship's radiated noise to reduce detection by enemy submarines. Self-noise is the noise generated by a ship that has an effect on its own sonar and sensors. Radiated noise is the noise generated by a ship that has an effect on other ship's sensors, especially submarines. The Masker-Prairie countermeasure systems are key elements in this program to reduce radiated noise and self-noise that are not reduced by controlling the sounds at their source or their transmission to the hull.

The use of air-bubbles and their effects upon acoustic wave propagation began to be studied systematically during the Second World War as part of a general effort to understand sound in submarine warfare. In the United States, this research effort was directed by the National Defense Research Committee (NDRC) and was carried out by various US Navy laboratories. The advances made in this research were published in The Physics of Sound in the Sea in 1946. Results of that study most pertinent to this discussion are found in Part IV of that volume Acoustic Properties of Wakes.

The use of bubble curtains have found wide spread applicability in reducing noise or the damaging effect of shock waves in a variety of industry from: underwater blasting, to pile driving, to explosive metal forming.

== Principle of operation ==
The Masker portion of the system is based upon creating a speed of sound (acoustic impedance) mismatch between the bubble curtain and the seawater. Acoustic waves encountering material with a radically different speed of sound do not penetrate, but are reflected back. The speed of sound in a medium is dependent upon the square root of stiffness of a material divided by its density. In a bubble cloud, the density is most similar to that of the water, but the stiffness is that of air. The result is that the speed of sound is almost ten times slower through a cloud of bubbles in water than in water itself, and is three times slower than the speed of sound in air. Thus, sounds within the ship (or submarine) hull which would otherwise go out into the water and propagate for a long distance are reflected back into the hull and are eventually dissipated. One can experience a manifestation of these physics concepts by filling one glass with water, a second glass with carbonated water, and tapping the side of each with a spoon. The water-filled vessel will ring. The vessel with bubbles in it will "thud".

The noise quieting of the Prairie screw works on a different principle. The principal noise problem with a screw is cavitation. The pressure behind the moving blade may become so low that it is less than the vapor pressure of water at that depth. This results in a water vapor bubble forming. When the bubble gets out of the low pressure area, it collapses right back into water and makes a loud noise in doing so. If, however, the trailing edge of the screw emits a small amount of air, then the cavitation bubbles have a bit of air within them. The collapse of the water vapor does not completely close the bubble, and thus little extra noise is generated.

== Masker ==
The Masker portion of the system is designed to silence a vessel's engine noise from detection by threat vessels and to reduce self-noise to increase the vessel's own sonar efficiency. The Masker portion typically consists of two bands fitted to the outside of the hull adjacent the vessel's engine rooms, compressed air is then forced into the bands and escapes through machined perforations to create a barrier of air bubbles in the sea about the hull, thus trapping machinery noise within the hull where it is dissipated.

== Prairie ==
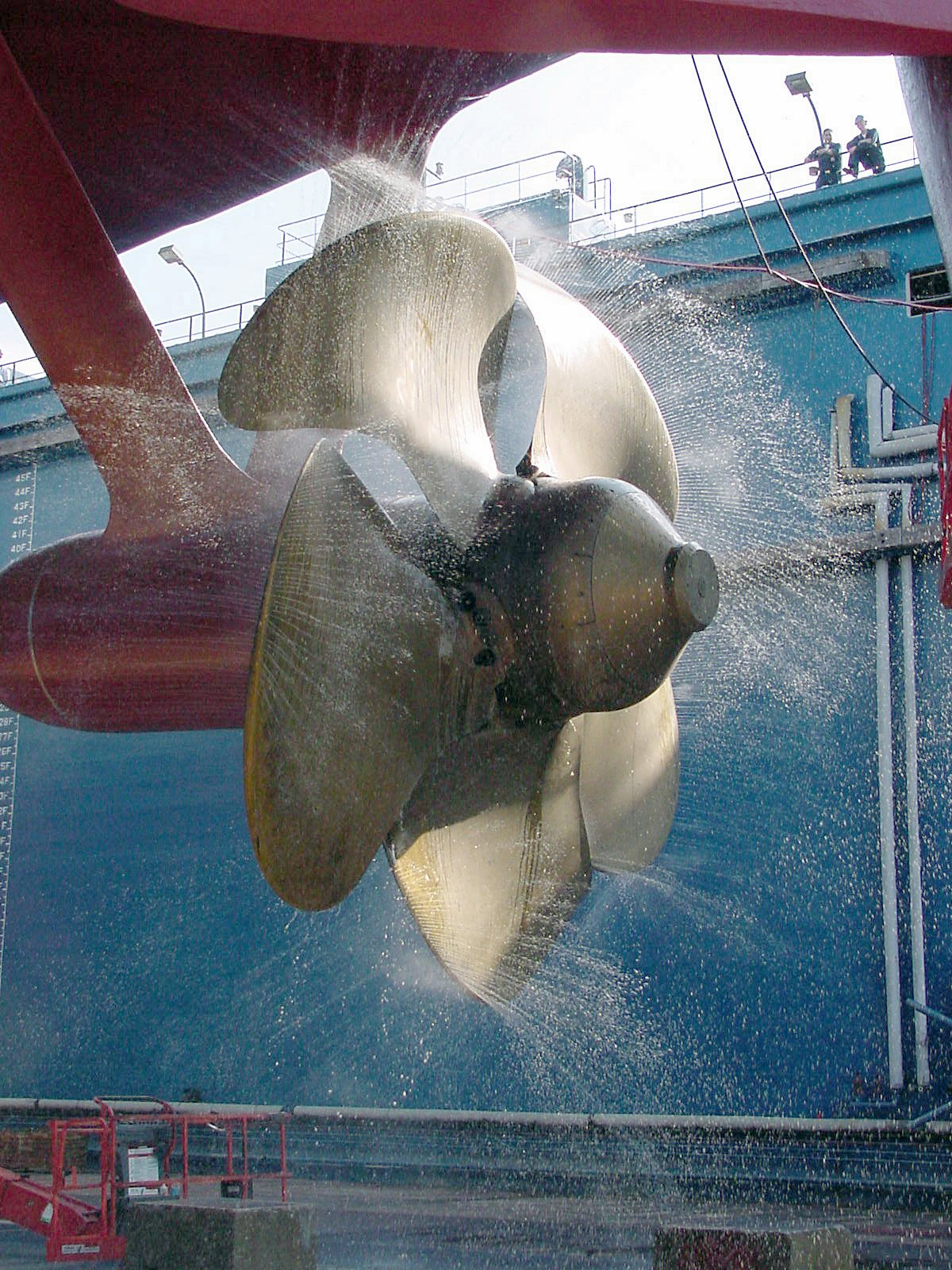
A propeller based Prairie system being tested in drydock.

Prairie (acronym: propeller air-induced emission) on the other hand, is fitted either near to or on the ships propellers and compressed air is pumped through small holes in the edges of the propeller. As might be expected, keeping a set of small holes clear of fouling under the surface of a ship or submarine can present a problem. On submarine installations this was prevented by running a trickle of fresh water through the system when the ship was in port. Most of the creatures that foul an ocean-going ship's hull cannot survive in fresh water.

A similar system called Agouti was fitted to Royal Navy frigates, Royal New Zealand Navy frigates, also to vessels such as INS Nilgiri.

== Submarines ==
In submarine use the large volume of air needed to operate the system needs to come from the surface, and therefore Prairie-Masker can only be used when the diesel submarine is snorkeling. This is not a serious limitation since the major noise source that needs quieting are the diesel engines, which are used only when snorkeling.

== See also ==
- Anechoic tile
