= Japanese submarine Isoshio =

At least two warships of Japan have been named Isoshio:

- JDS Isoshio (SS-568), an Uzushio-class submarine launched in 1972 and expended as a target in 1994
- JDS Isoshio (SS-594), an Oyashio-class submarine launched in 2000
