= Japanese submarine Yaeshio =

At least two warships of Japan have been named Yaeshio:

- JDS Yaeshio (SS-572), an Uzushio-class submarine launched in 1977 and struck in 1996
- JDS Yaeshio (SS-598), an Oyashio-class submarine launched in 2004
