= JS Makishio =

Oyashio-class submarines

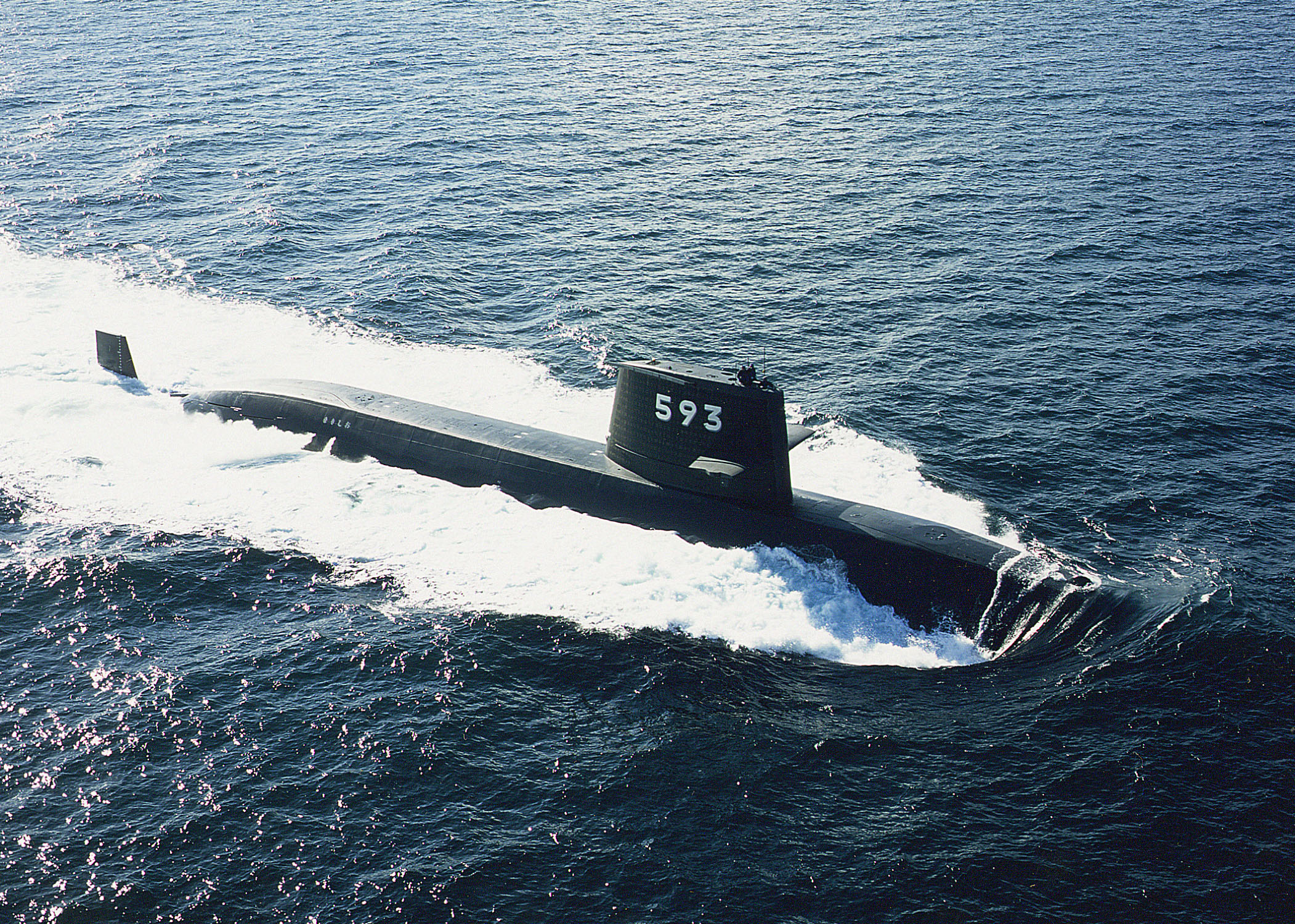
- JS Makishio

History

Japan
- Name: Makishio; (まきしお)
- Namesake: 薪塩 ("firewood & salt")
- Ordered: 1996
- Builder: Mitsubishi, Kobe
- Cost: ¥52.19 million
- Laid down: 6 March 1996
- Launched: 26 November 1998
- Commissioned: 29 March 2001
- Reclassified: 17 March 2023 (as training vessel)
- Home port: Kure
- Identification: Pennant number: TSS-
- Status: Active as training submarine

General characteristics
- Class & type: Oyashio-class submarine
- Displacement: 2,750 tonnes (surfaced); 4,000 tonnes (submerged)
- Length: 81.7 m (268 ft 1 in)
- Beam: 8.9 m (29 ft 2 in)
- Draught: 7.4 m (24 ft 3 in)
- Propulsion: Diesel-electric; 2 Kawasaki 12V25S diesel engines; 2 Kawasaki alternators; 2 Toshiba motors; 3,400 hp (2,500 kW) surfaced; 7,750 hp (5,780 kW) submerged
- Speed: 12 knots (22 km/h; 14 mph) (surfaced); 20 knots (37 km/h; 23 mph) (submerged)
- Complement: 70 (10 officers)
- Sensors & processing systems: Sonar: Hughes/Oki ZQQ-6 hull-mounted sonar, flank arrays, 1 towed array; Radar: JRC ZPS 6 I-band search radar.
- Armament: 6 × HU-605 21 in (533 mm) torpedo tubes with 20 reloads for: Type 89 torpedoes; UGM-84 Harpoon missiles

JS Makishio (hull number SS-593) is the fourth boat of the Oyashio-class submarines built for the Japan Maritime Self-Defense Force. She was commissioned on 29 March 2001. After 22 years of active service as an attack submarine, Makashio was reassigned as a training vessel on 17 March 2023.

== Construction and career ==
Makishio was laid down at Mitsubishi Heavy Industries Kobe Shipyard on 6 March 1996 and launched on 26 November 1998. She was commissioned on 9 March 2000 and deployed to Yokosuka.

On 6 August 2008, she left Kure for Hawaii for the major naval exercise RIMPAC 2008, and she returned to Kure on 12 November.

The submarine participated in RIMPAC 2019 from 30 March to 29 June 2019, and she conducted offshore training and facility use training in the Hawaiian Islands area.

Upon Oyashio's decommissioning on 17 March 2023, Makishio was converted to a training submarine as a replacement.

== Gallery ==
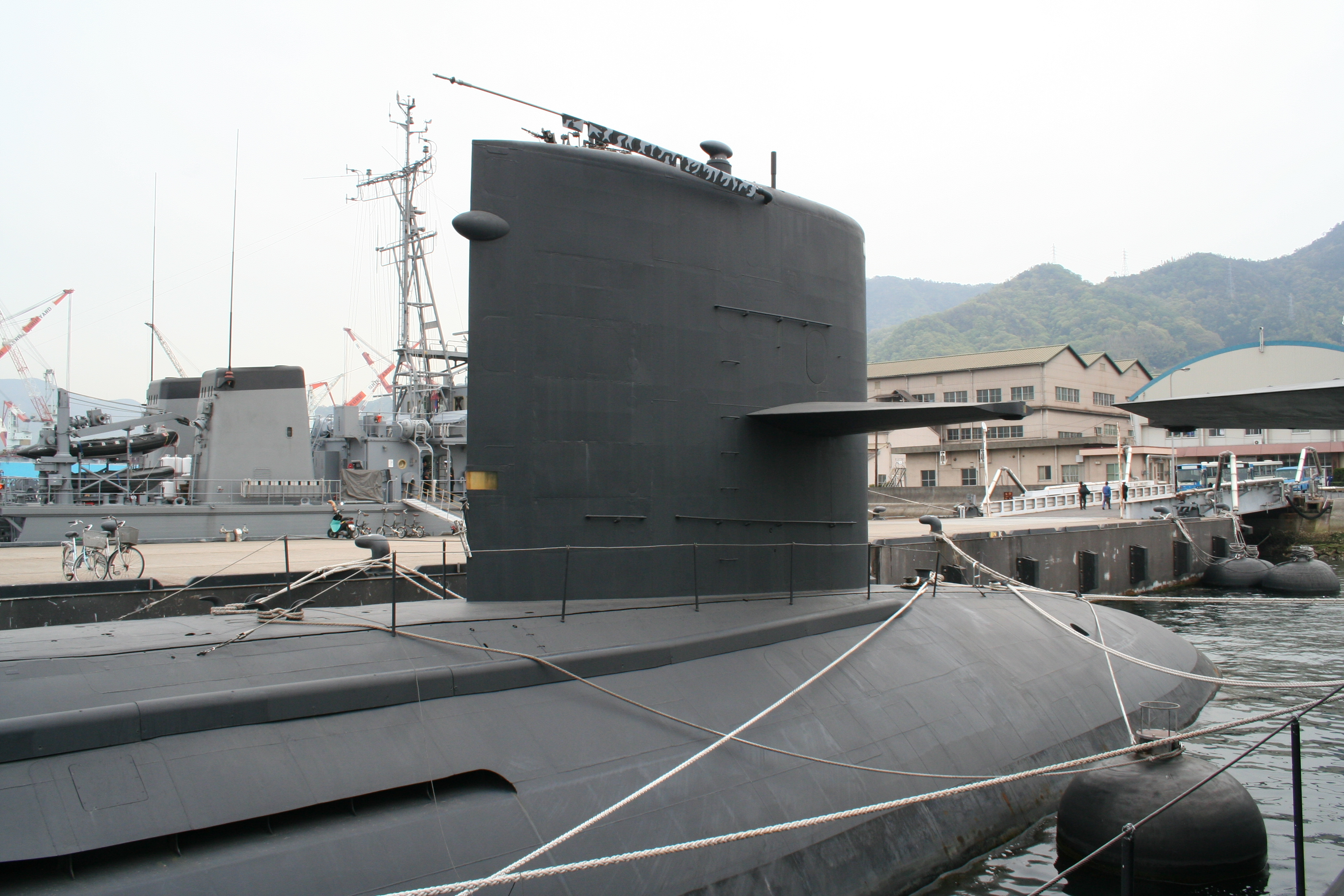
JS Makishio's sail
