= JS Setoshio =

Oyashio-class submarines

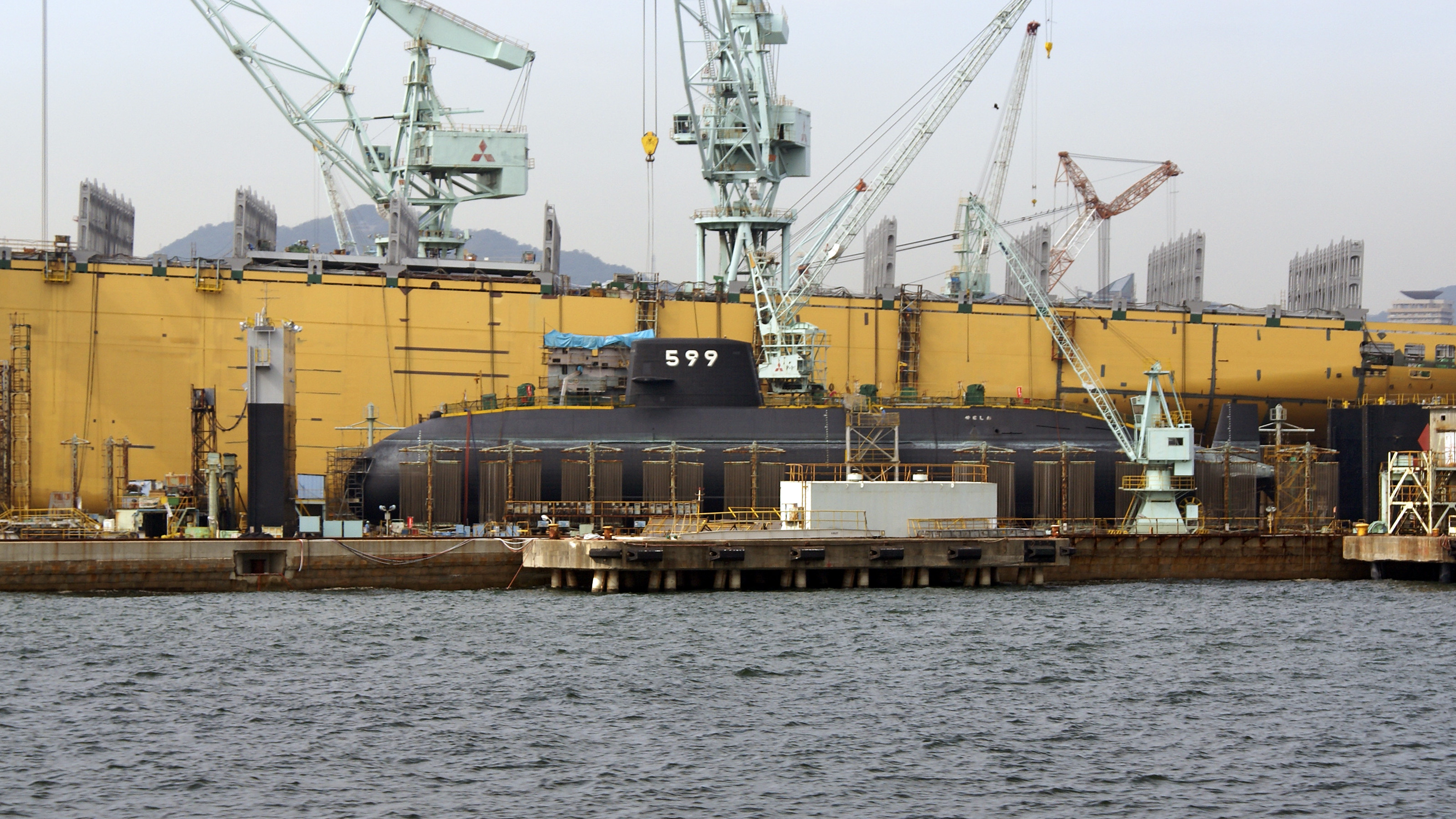
- JS Setoshio on 29 October 2006

History

Japan
- Name: Setoshio; (せとしお)
- Namesake: "Gate of the tide/current"
- Ordered: 2002
- Builder: Mitsubishi, Kobe
- Cost: ¥52.19 million
- Laid down: 23 January 2003
- Launched: 5 October 2005
- Commissioned: 28 February 2007
- Home port: Yokosuka
- Identification: Pennant number: SS-599
- Status: Active

General characteristics
- Class & type: Oyashio-class submarine
- Displacement: 2,750 tonnes (surfaced); 4,000 tonnes (submerged)
- Length: 81.7 m (268 ft 1 in)
- Beam: 8.9 m (29 ft 2 in)
- Draught: 7.4 m (24 ft 3 in)
- Propulsion: Diesel-electric; 2 Kawasaki 12V25S diesel engines; 2 Kawasaki alternators; 2 Toshiba motors; 3,400 hp (2,500 kW) surfaced; 7,750 hp (5,780 kW) submerged
- Speed: 12 knots (22 km/h; 14 mph) (surfaced); 20 knots (37 km/h; 23 mph) (submerged)
- Complement: 70 (10 officers)
- Sensors & processing systems: Sonar: Hughes/Oki ZQQ-6 hull-mounted sonar, flank arrays, 1 towed array; Radar: JRC ZPS 6 I-band search radar.
- Armament: 6 × HU-605 21 in (533 mm) torpedo tubes with 20 reloads for: Type 89 torpedoes; UGM-84 Harpoon missiles

JS Setoshio (SS-599) is the tenth boat of the Oyashio-class submarines. She was commissioned on 28 February 2007.

== Construction and career ==
Setoshio was laid down at Mitsubishi Heavy Industries Kobe Shipyard on 23 January 2003 and launched on 5 October 2005. She was commissioned on 28 February 2007 and deployed to Yokohama.

On 22 August 2014, she left Yokosuka to participate in the US dispatch training, stayed in the Hawaii area from mid-September to late October to carry out various trainings, and returned to Yokosuka on 22 November.

From 14 January 2021 to 1 April 2021, the submarine participated in a second US dispatch training, which was held in the waters from Japan to the Hawaiian Islands. During the period, with the cooperation of the US Navy, offshore training and facility use training will be conducted to improve tactical skills.
