= JS Michishio =

Oyashio-class submarines

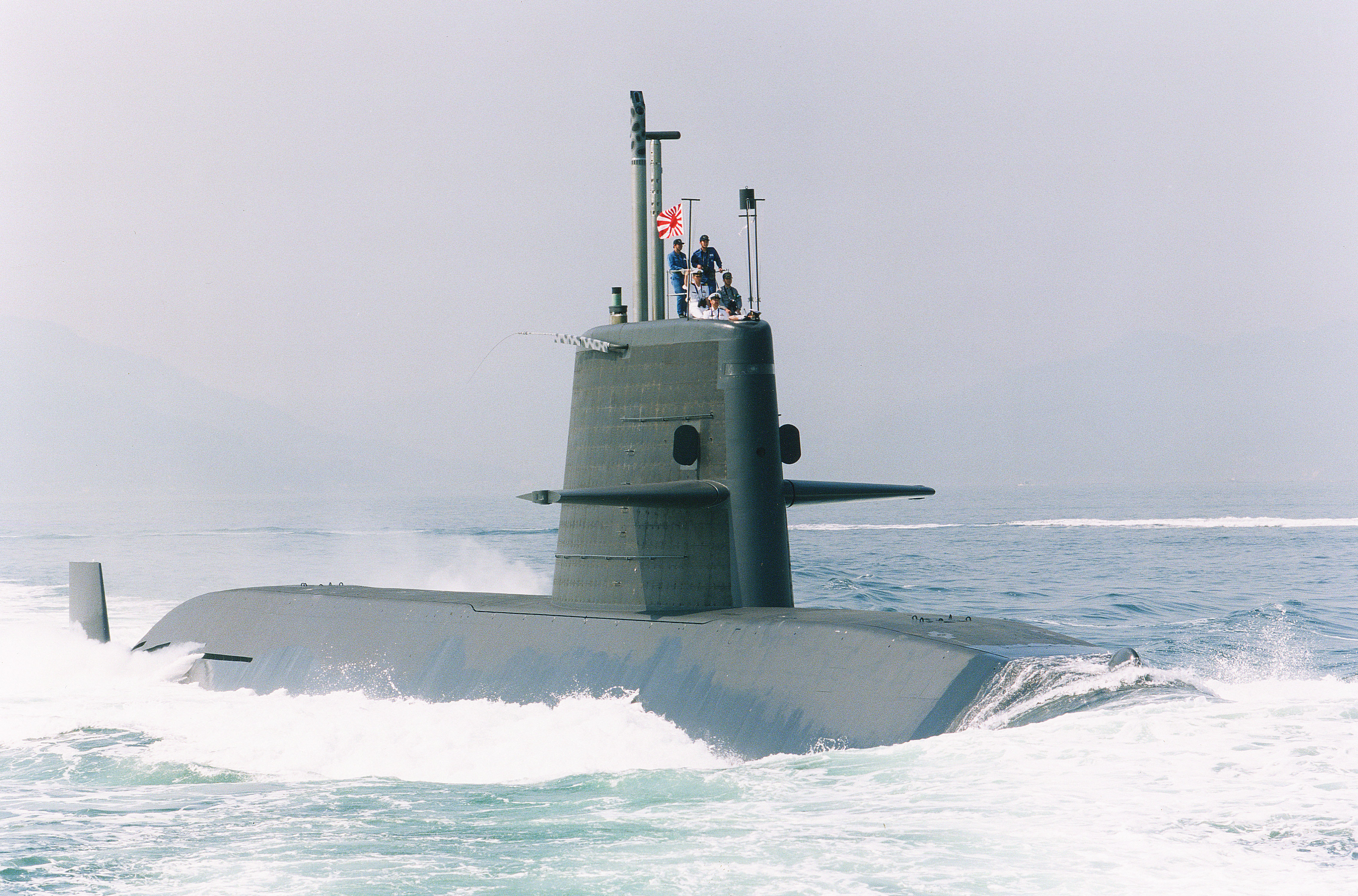
- JS Michishio

History

Japan
- Name: Michishio; (みちしお)
- Ordered: 1994
- Builder: Mitsubishi, Kobe
- Cost: ¥52.19 million
- Laid down: 16 February 1995
- Launched: 18 September 1997
- Commissioned: 10 March 1999
- Reclassified: 27 February 2017 to TSS-3609
- Home port: Kure
- Identification: Pennant number: TSS-3609
- Status: Active as training submarine

General characteristics
- Class & type: Oyashio-class submarine
- Displacement: 2,750 tonnes (surfaced); 4,000 tonnes (submerged)
- Length: 81.7 m (268 ft 1 in)
- Beam: 8.9 m (29 ft 2 in)
- Draught: 7.4 m (24 ft 3 in)
- Propulsion: Diesel-electric; 2 Kawasaki 12V25S diesel engines; 2 Kawasaki alternators; 2 Toshiba motors; 3,400 hp (2,500 kW) surfaced; 7,750 hp (5,780 kW) submerged
- Speed: 12 knots (22 km/h; 14 mph) (surfaced); 20 knots (37 km/h; 23 mph) (submerged)
- Complement: 70 (10 officers)
- Sensors & processing systems: Sonar: Hughes/Oki ZQQ-6 hull-mounted sonar, flank arrays, 1 towed array; Radar: JRC ZPS 6 I-band search radar.
- Armament: 6 × HU-605 21 in (533 mm) torpedo tubes with 20 reloads for: Type 89 torpedoes; UGM-84 Harpoon missiles

JS Michishio (SS-591) is the second boat of the Oyashio-class submarines. She was commissioned on 10 March 1999, and served as an attack submarine for 18 years before being reassigned as a training vessel, with the redesignated hull number TSS-3609.

== Construction and career ==
Michishio was laid down at Mitsubishi Heavy Industries Kobe Shipyard on 16 February 1995 and launched on 18 September 1997. She was commissioned on 10 March 1999 and deployed to Kure.

The vessel participated in RIMPAC 2007 from 9 January to 11 April 2007.

On 27 February 2017, when the training submarine Asashio was decommissioned, Michishio was converted to a training submarine and transferred to the 1st training submarine under the direct control of the submarine fleet. From 18 March to 1 May 2017, the 2016 open sea practice voyage (flight) was carried out with the escort ship JS Akizuki and the two vessels called at Kota Kinabalu, Malaysia.

On 18 June 2020, Lieutenant Risa Takenouchi was the first woman in Japanese service to be appointed to the crew of a submarine. Takenouchi, who entered the "submarine education and training corps" for the first time in January, was educated for about five months. After completing the course, she joined the training unit Michishio and started training on a submarine. On 29 October 2020, the first female submarine crew was created. Five female SDF personnel, including Yumeka Taguchi, a third-class sea sergeant, joined the submarine education and training corps in February 2020 and, after undergoing the curriculum, conducted practical training on the ship from June for about four months. After completing the training, they were awarded the emblem (commonly known as the "Dolphin Mark"), which is a proof of the crew of the submarine.

== Gallery ==
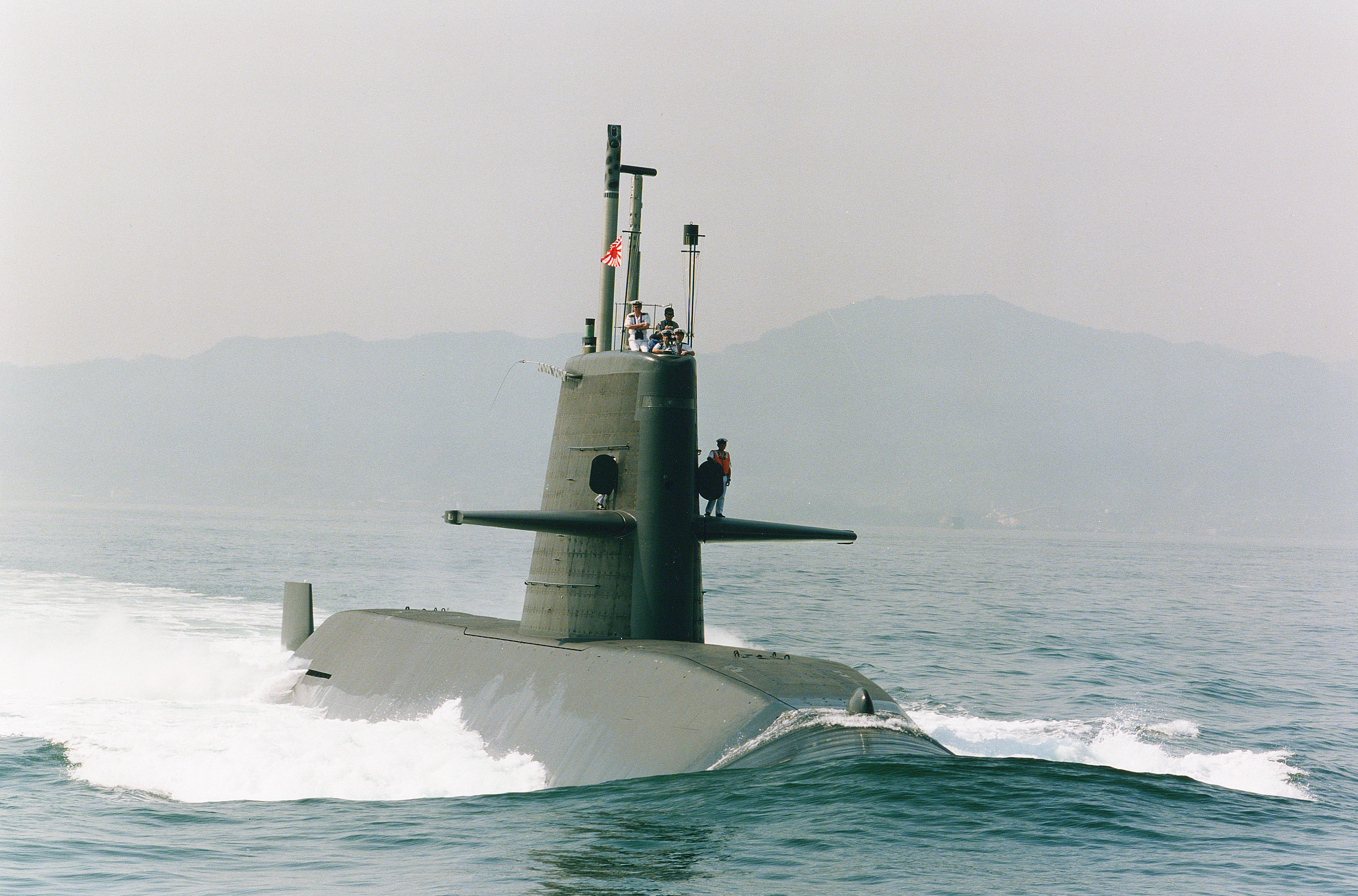
JS Michishio underway.

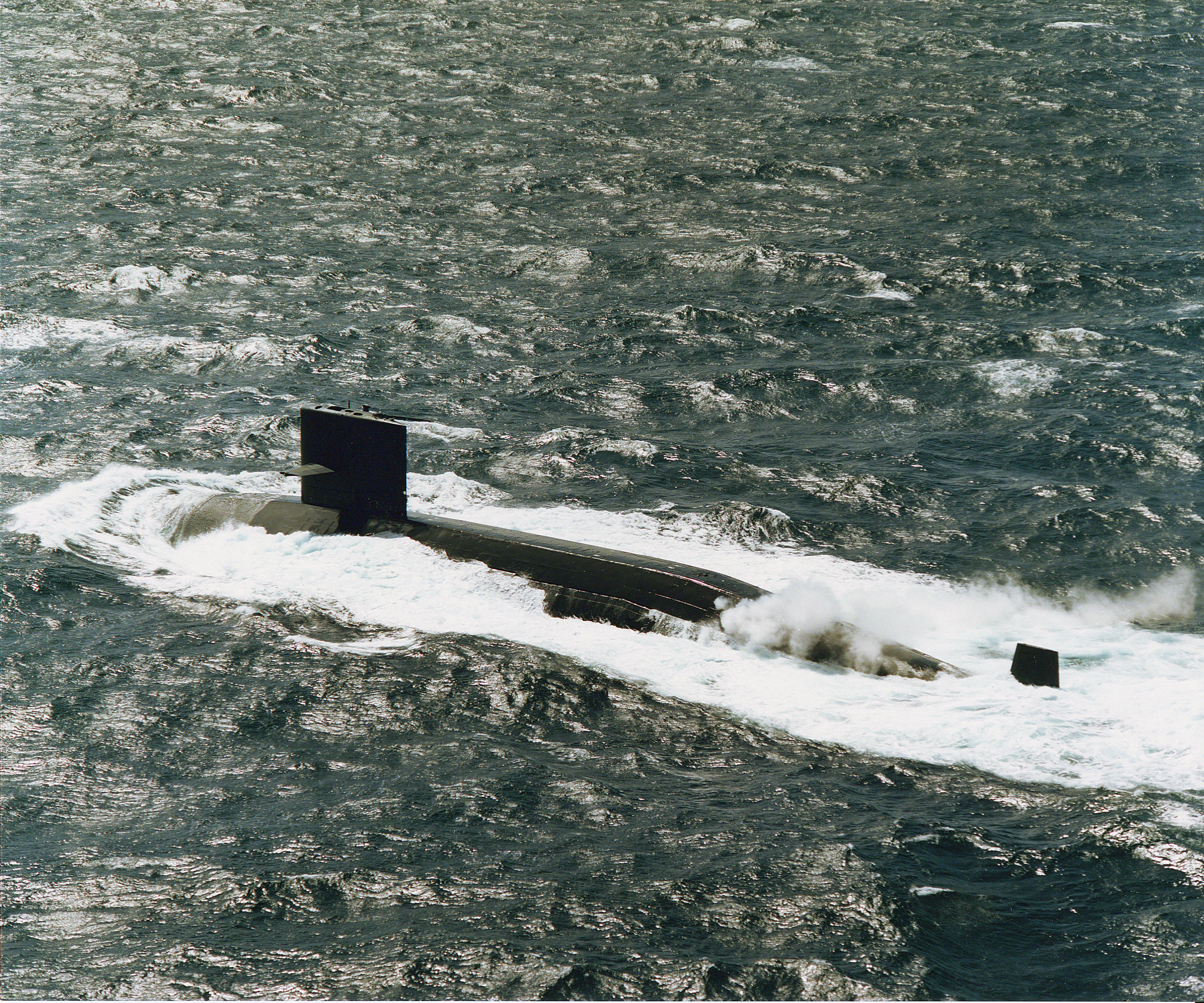
JS Michishio underway.
