= JS Yaeshio =

Oyashio-class submarines

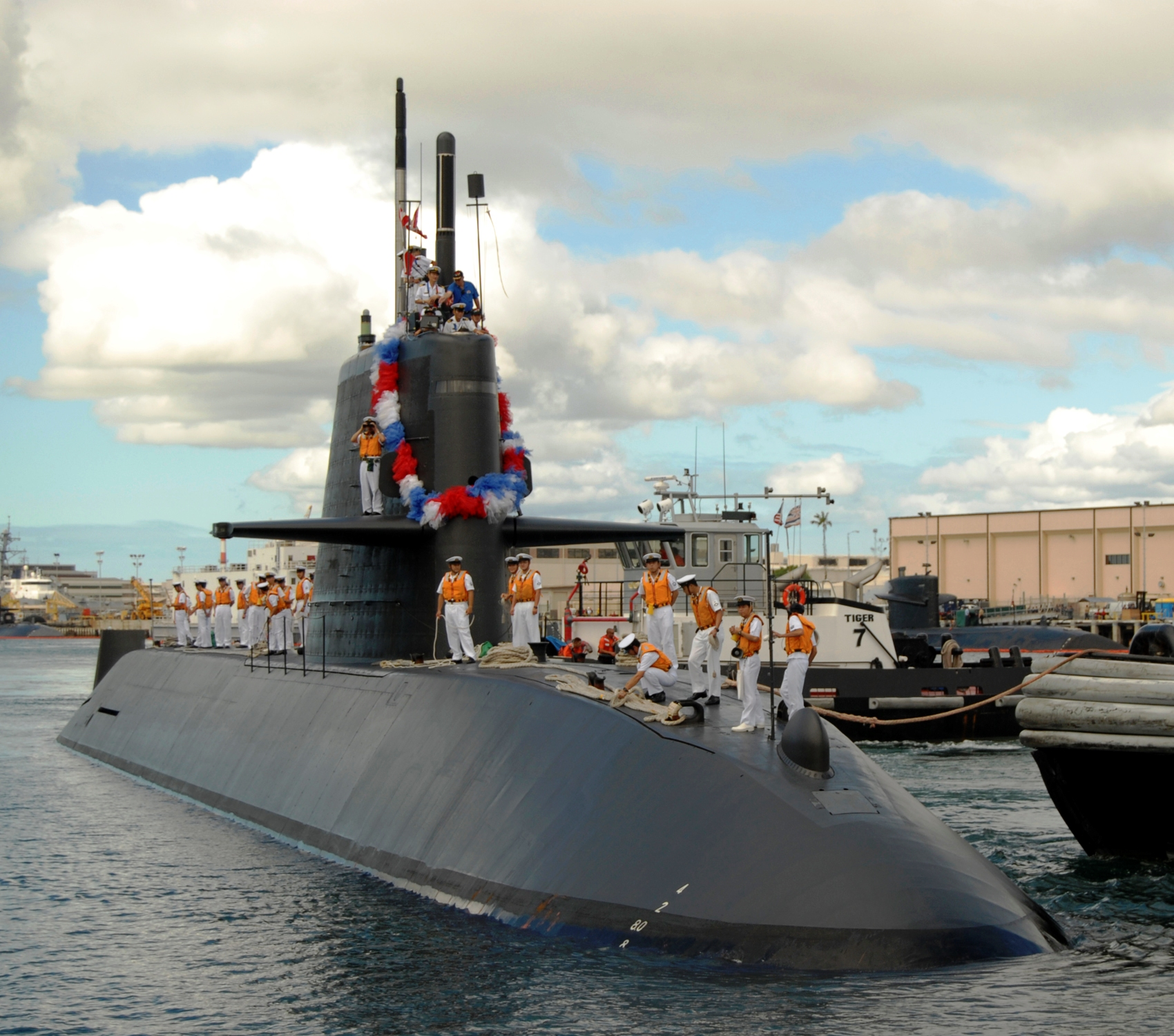
- JS Yaeshio

History

Japan
- Name: Yaeshio; (やえしお)
- Namesake: Yaeshio (1977)
- Ordered: 2001
- Builder: Kawasaki, Kobe
- Cost: ¥52.19 million
- Laid down: 15 January 2002
- Launched: 4 November 2004
- Commissioned: 9 March 2006
- Home port: Yokosuka
- Identification: Pennant number: SS-598
- Status: Active

General characteristics
- Class & type: Oyashio-class submarine
- Displacement: 2,750 tonnes (surfaced); 4,000 tonnes (submerged)
- Length: 81.7 m (268 ft 1 in)
- Beam: 8.9 m (29 ft 2 in)
- Draught: 7.4 m (24 ft 3 in)
- Propulsion: Diesel-electric; 2 Kawasaki 12V25S diesel engines; 2 Kawasaki alternators; 2 Toshiba motors; 3,400 hp (2,500 kW) surfaced; 7,750 hp (5,780 kW) submerged
- Speed: 12 knots (22 km/h; 14 mph) (surfaced); 20 knots (37 km/h; 23 mph) (submerged)
- Complement: 70 (10 officers)
- Sensors & processing systems: Sonar: Hughes/Oki ZQQ-6 hull-mounted sonar, flank arrays, 1 towed array; Radar: JRC ZPS 6 I-band search radar.
- Armament: 6 × HU-605 21 in (533 mm) torpedo tubes with 20 reloads for: Type 89 torpedoes; UGM-84 Harpoon missiles

JS Yaeshio (SS-598) is the ninth boat of the Oyashio-class submarines. She was commissioned on 9 March 2006.

== Construction and career ==
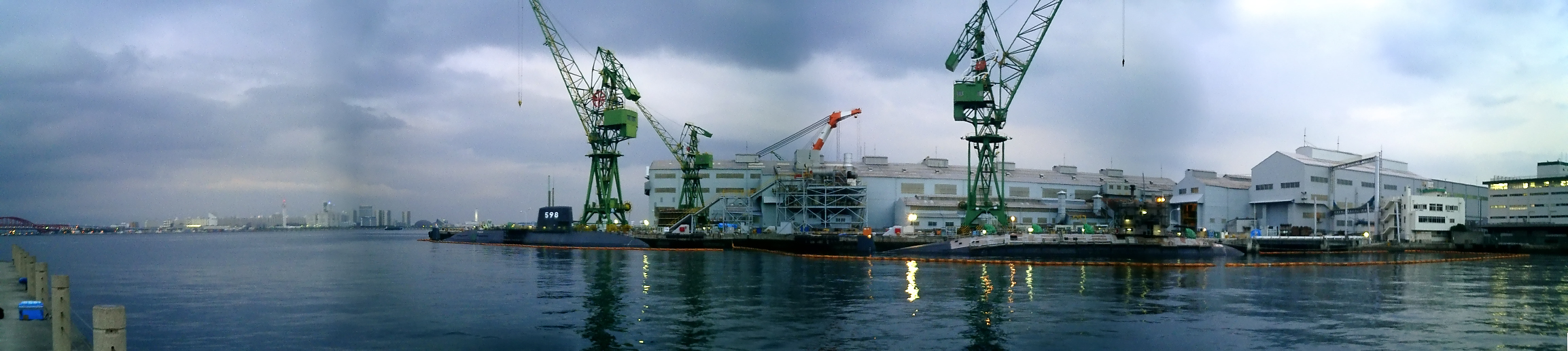
JS Yaeshio at Kobe on 11 July 2005.

Yaeshio was laid down at Kawasaki Heavy Industries Kobe Shipyard on 15 January 2002 and launched on 4 November 2004. She was commissioned on 9 March 2006 and deployed to Yokohama.

The submarine participated in RIMPAC 2009 from 27 August to 8 December 2009.

On 14 January 2014, she left Yokosuka to participate in the RIMPAC 2014, stayed in the Hawaii and Guam areas to conduct various trainings, and returned to Yokosuka on 24 April.

== Gallery ==
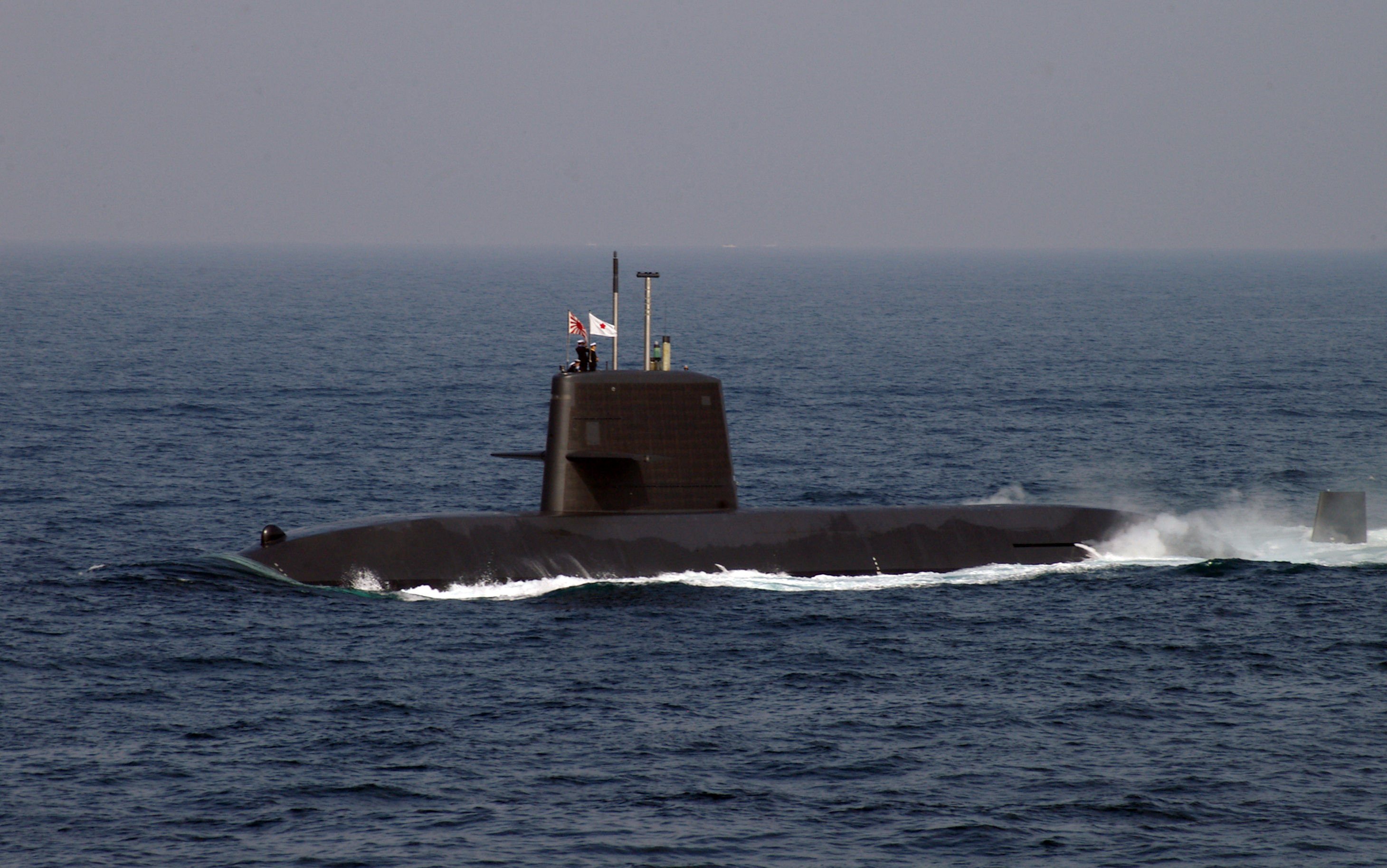
JS Yaeshio during JMSDF Fleet Review in 2006.

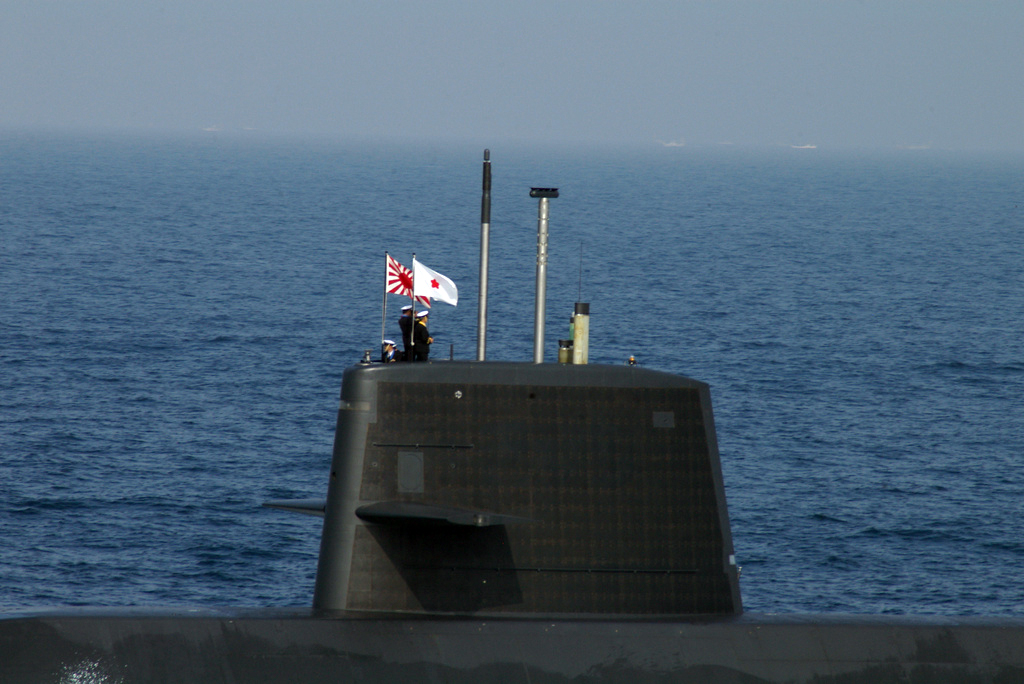
JS Yaeshio during JMSDF Fleet Review in 2006.
