= JS Takashio =

Oyashio-class submarines

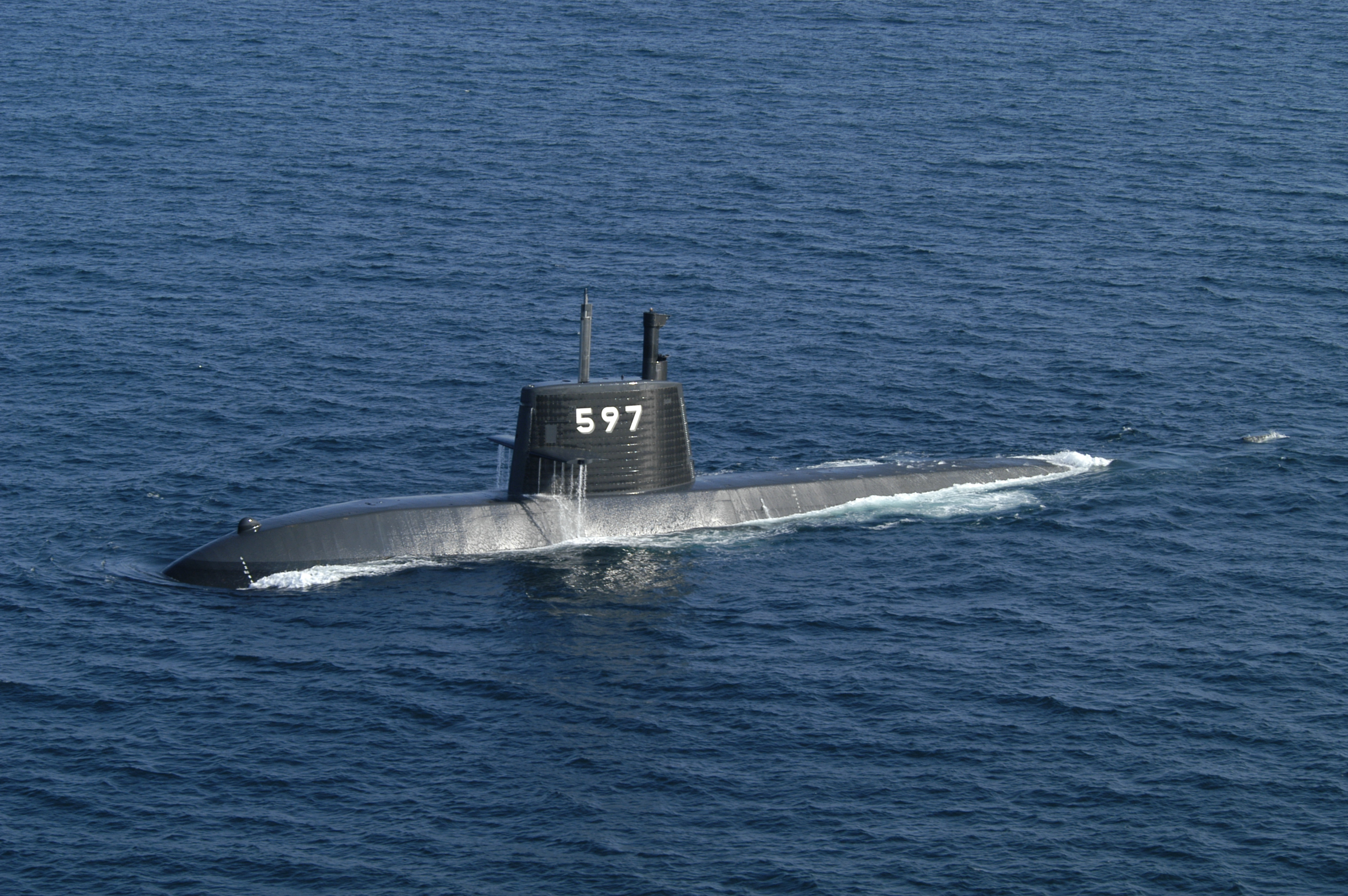
- JS Takashio

History

Japan
- Name: Takashio; (たかしお)
- Ordered: 2000
- Builder: Mitsubishi, Kobe
- Cost: ¥52.19 million
- Laid down: 30 January 2001
- Launched: 1 October 2003
- Commissioned: 9 March 2005
- Home port: Yokosuka
- Identification: Pennant number: SS-597
- Status: Active

General characteristics
- Class & type: Oyashio-class submarine
- Displacement: 2,750 tonnes (surfaced); 4,000 tonnes (submerged)
- Length: 81.7 m (268 ft 1 in)
- Beam: 8.9 m (29 ft 2 in)
- Draught: 7.4 m (24 ft 3 in)
- Propulsion: Diesel-electric; 2 Kawasaki 12V25S diesel engines; 2 Kawasaki alternators; 2 Toshiba motors; 3,400 hp (2,500 kW) surfaced; 7,750 hp (5,780 kW) submerged
- Speed: 12 knots (22 km/h; 14 mph) (surfaced); 20 knots (37 km/h; 23 mph) (submerged)
- Complement: 70 (10 officers)
- Sensors & processing systems: Sonar: Hughes/Oki ZQQ-6 hull-mounted sonar, flank arrays, 1 towed array; Radar: JRC ZPS 6 I-band search radar.
- Armament: 6 × HU-605 21 in (533 mm) torpedo tubes with 20 reloads for: Type 89 torpedoes; UGM-84 Harpoon missiles

JS Takashio (SS-597) is the eighth boat of the Oyashio-class submarines. She was commissioned on 9 March 2005.

== Construction and career ==
Takashio was laid down at Mitsubishi Heavy Industries Kobe Shipyard on 30 January 2001 and launched on 1 October 2003. She was commissioned on 9 March 2005 and deployed to Yokohama.

On 10 October 2012, she headed for Hawaii via Guam for training in the United States, and was dispatched until 23 January 2013. From 22 July to 21 October 2016, she participated in the US dispatch training and conducted offshore training and facility use training in the Hawaiian Islands area.

== Gallery ==
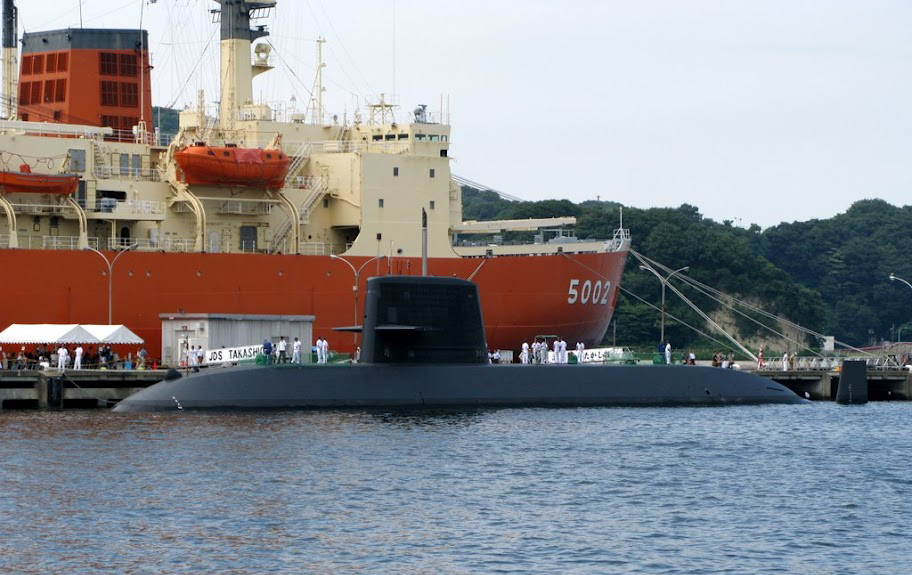
JS Takashio at Yokosuka on 1 August 2009.

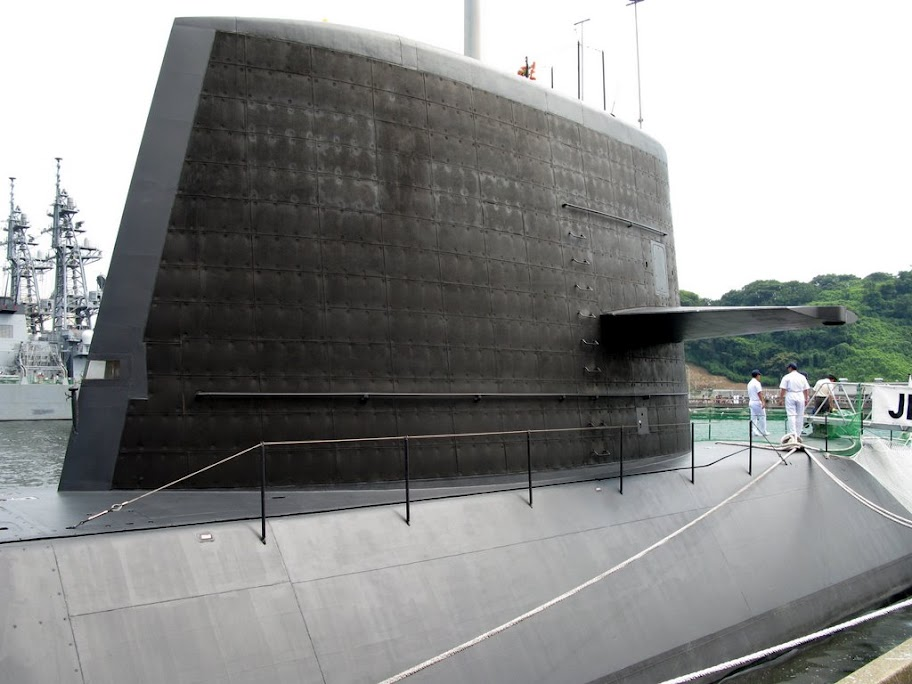
JS Takashio at Yokosuka on 1 August 2009.

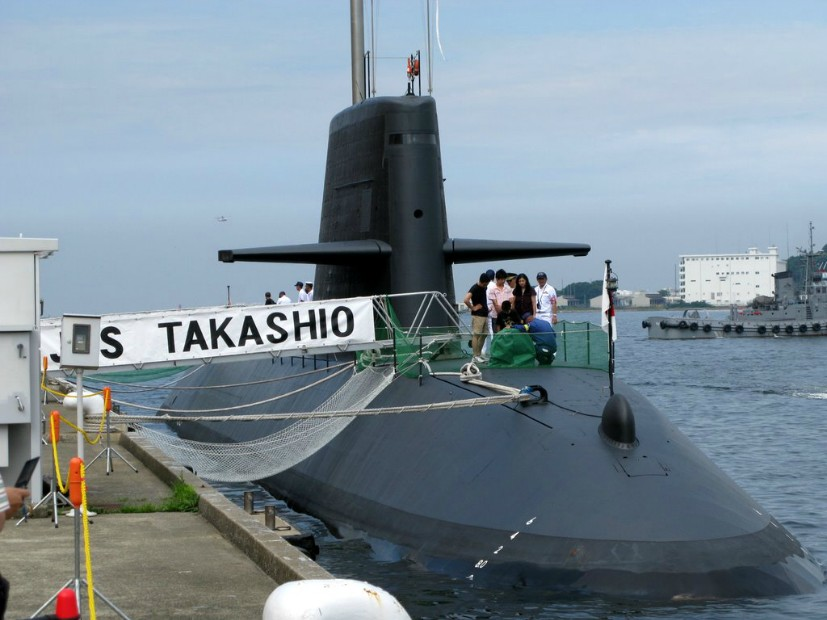
JS Takashio at Yokosuka on 1 August 2009.

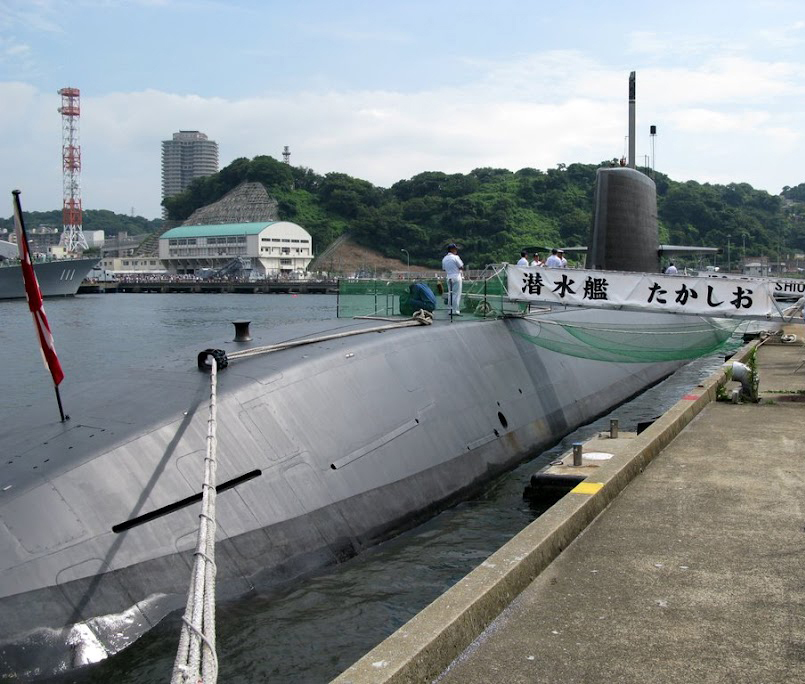
JS Takashio at Yokosuka in 2009.

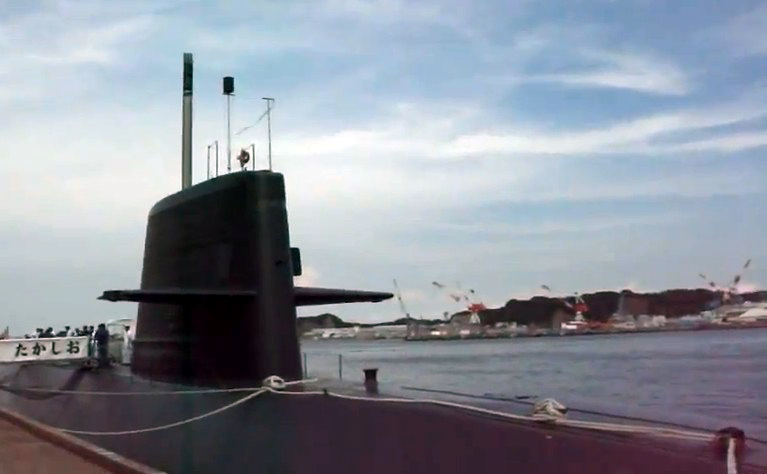
JS Takashio at Yokosuka on 6 August 2011.

JS Takashio's periscope on 6 August 2011.

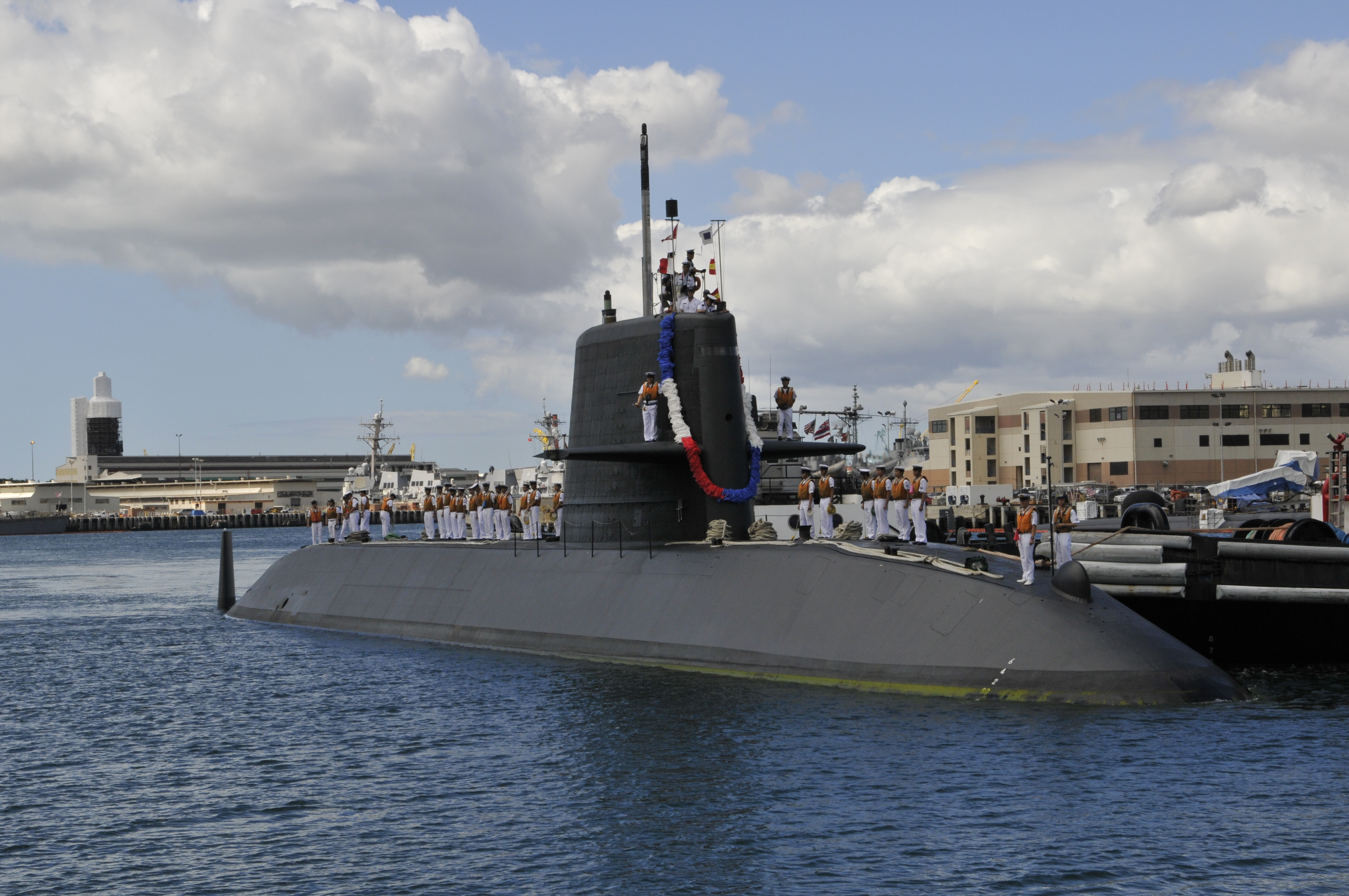
JS Takashio at Pearl Harbor on 31 October 2012.

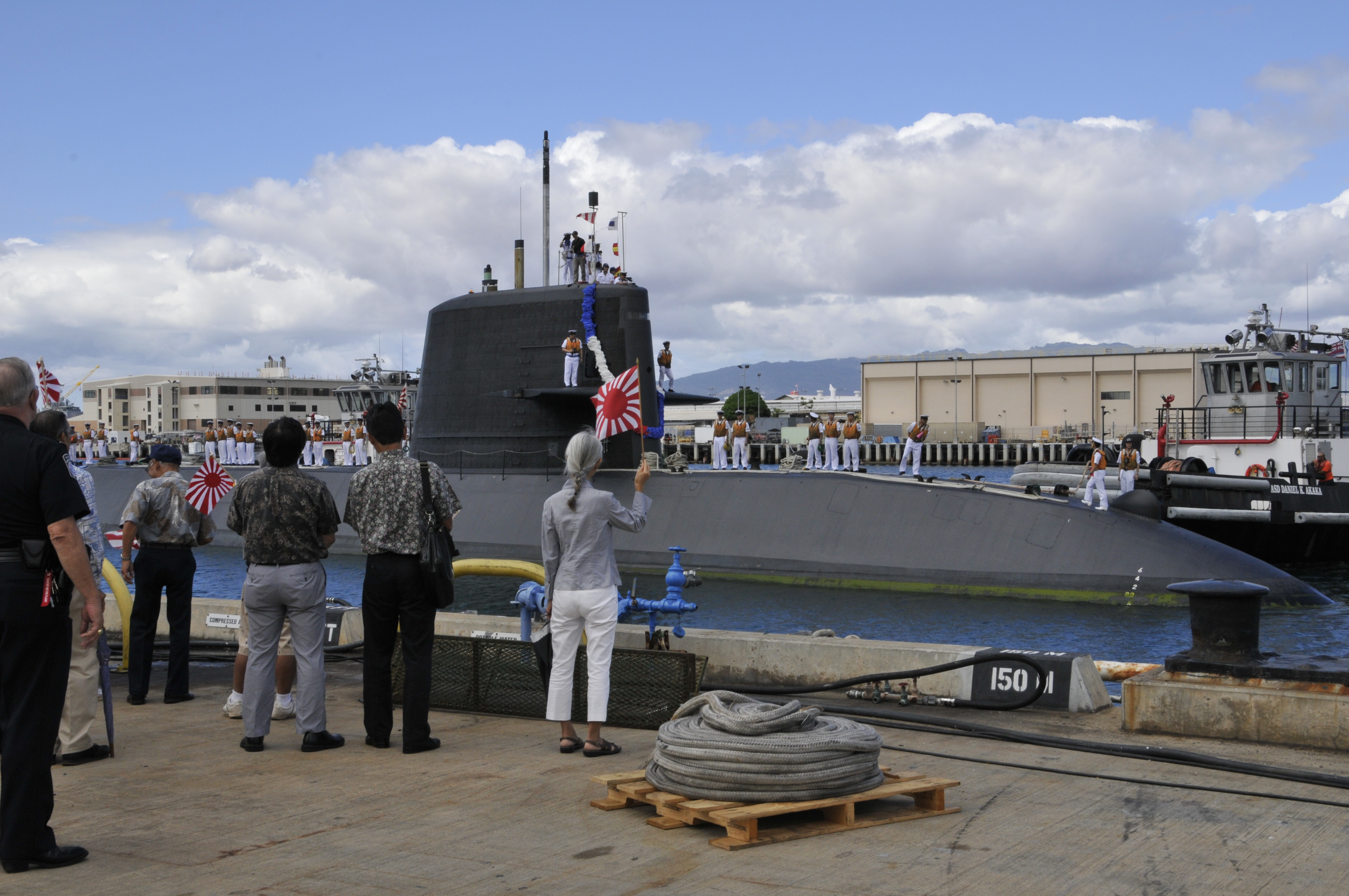
JS Takashio at Pearl Harbor on 31 October 2012.

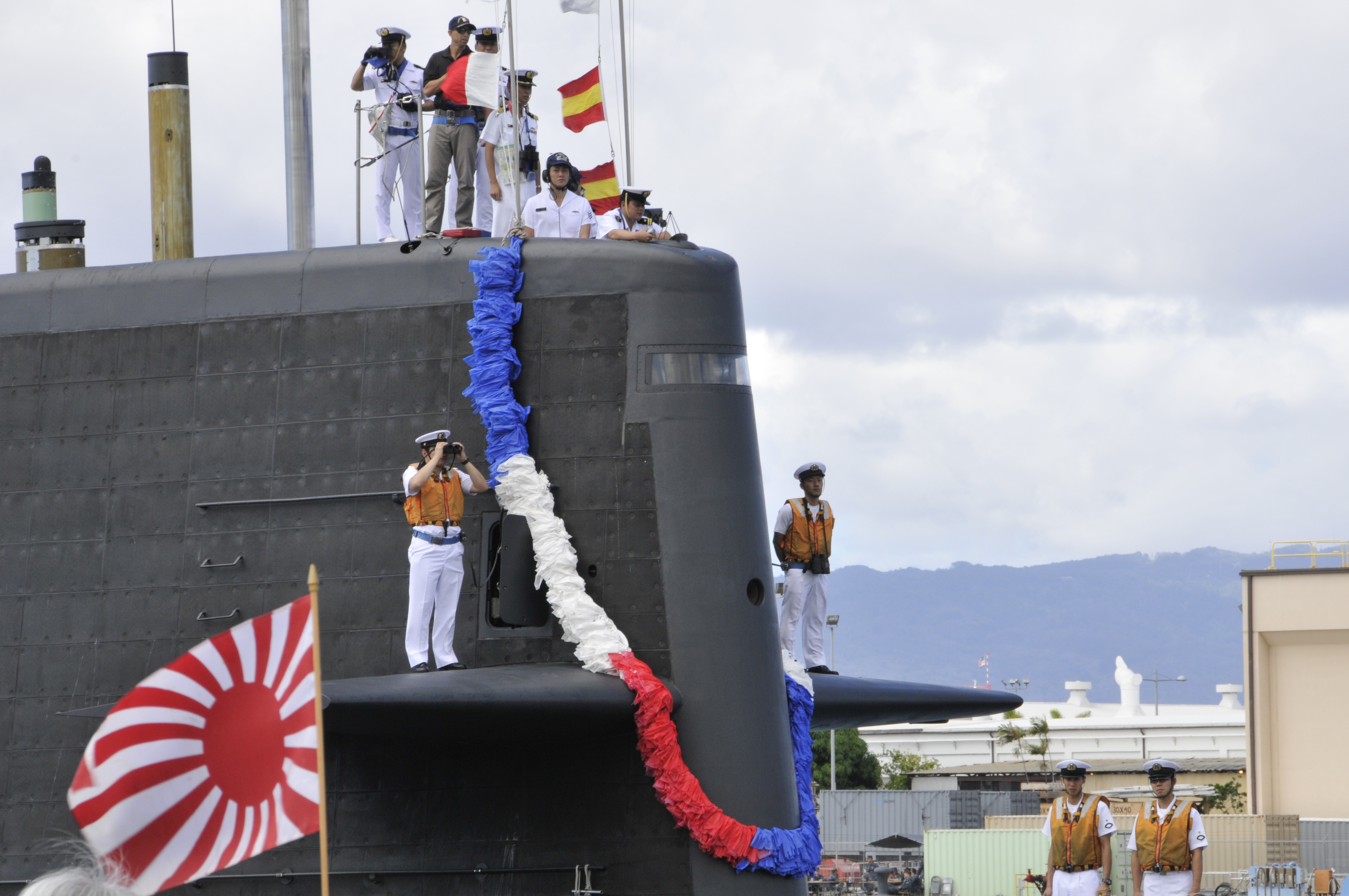
JS Takashio at Pearl Harbor on 31 October 2012.
