= JS Mochishio =

Oyashio-class submarines

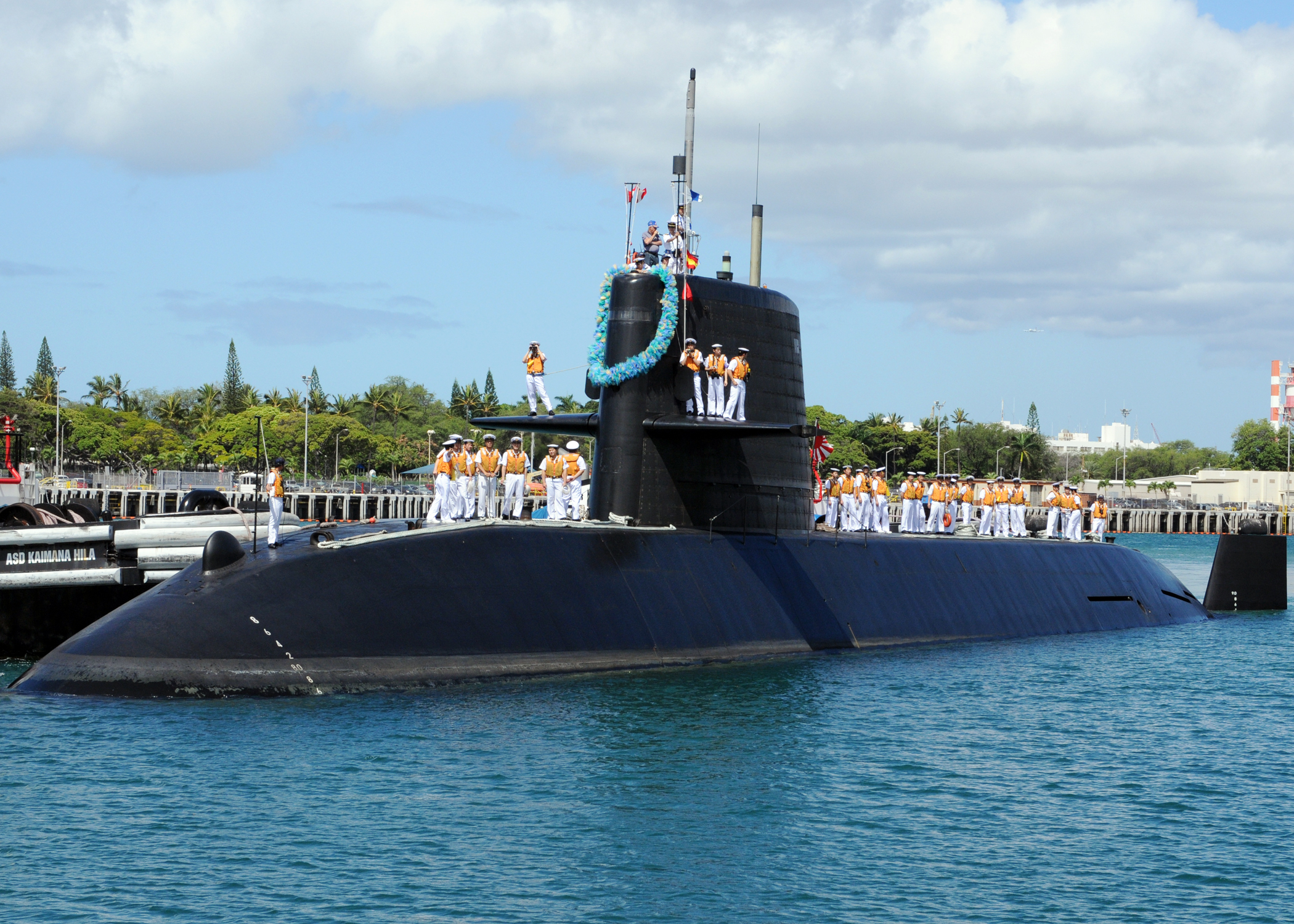
- JS Mochishio at Pearl Harbor on 29 September 2009

History

Japan
- Name: Mochishio; (もちしお)
- Namesake: Mochi (餅) & Shio (塩)(salt/seawater)
- Ordered: 2003
- Builder: Kawasaki, Kobe
- Cost: ¥52.19 million
- Laid down: 23 February 2004
- Launched: 6 November 2006
- Commissioned: 6 March 2008
- Home port: Kure
- Identification: Pennant number: SS-600
- Status: Active

General characteristics
- Class & type: Oyashio-class submarine
- Displacement: 2,750 tonnes (surfaced); 4,000 tonnes (submerged)
- Length: 81.7 m (268 ft 1 in)
- Beam: 8.9 m (29 ft 2 in)
- Draught: 7.4 m (24 ft 3 in)
- Propulsion: Diesel-electric; 2 Kawasaki 12V25S diesel engines; 2 Kawasaki alternators; 2 Toshiba motors; 3,400 hp (2,500 kW) surfaced; 7,750 hp (5,780 kW) submerged
- Speed: 12 knots (22 km/h; 14 mph) (surfaced); 20 knots (37 km/h; 23 mph) (submerged)
- Complement: 70 (10 officers)
- Sensors & processing systems: Sonar: Hughes/Oki ZQQ-6 hull-mounted sonar, flank arrays, 1 towed array; Radar: JRC ZPS 6 I-band search radar.
- Armament: 6 × HU-605 21 in (533 mm) torpedo tubes with 20 reloads for: Type 89 torpedoes; UGM-84 Harpoon missiles

JS Mochisio (SS-600) is the eleventh boat of the Oyashio-class submarines built for the Japan Maritime Self-Defense Force. She was commissioned on 6 March 2008 and is the second Japanese submarine named Mochishio. In service for 18 years as of 2026, Mochishio is the newest of the Oyashio-class boats, and the last one built for the JMSDF.

== Construction and career ==
Mochisio was laid down at Kawasaki Heavy Industries Kobe Shipyard on 23 February 2004 and launched on 6 November 2006. She was commissioned on 6 March 2008 and deployed to Kure.

The vessel departed Wu on 31 May 2010 to participate in RIMPAC 2010 and arrived at Pearl Harbor, Hawaii on 21 June. She trained in the waters around Hawaii until 1 August, and returned to Kure around 27 August of the same year.

On 12 October 2011, she set sail for Hawaii via Guam for US dispatch training. The training was conducted from late October to mid-December, and returned to the port on 21 January 2012.

== Gallery ==
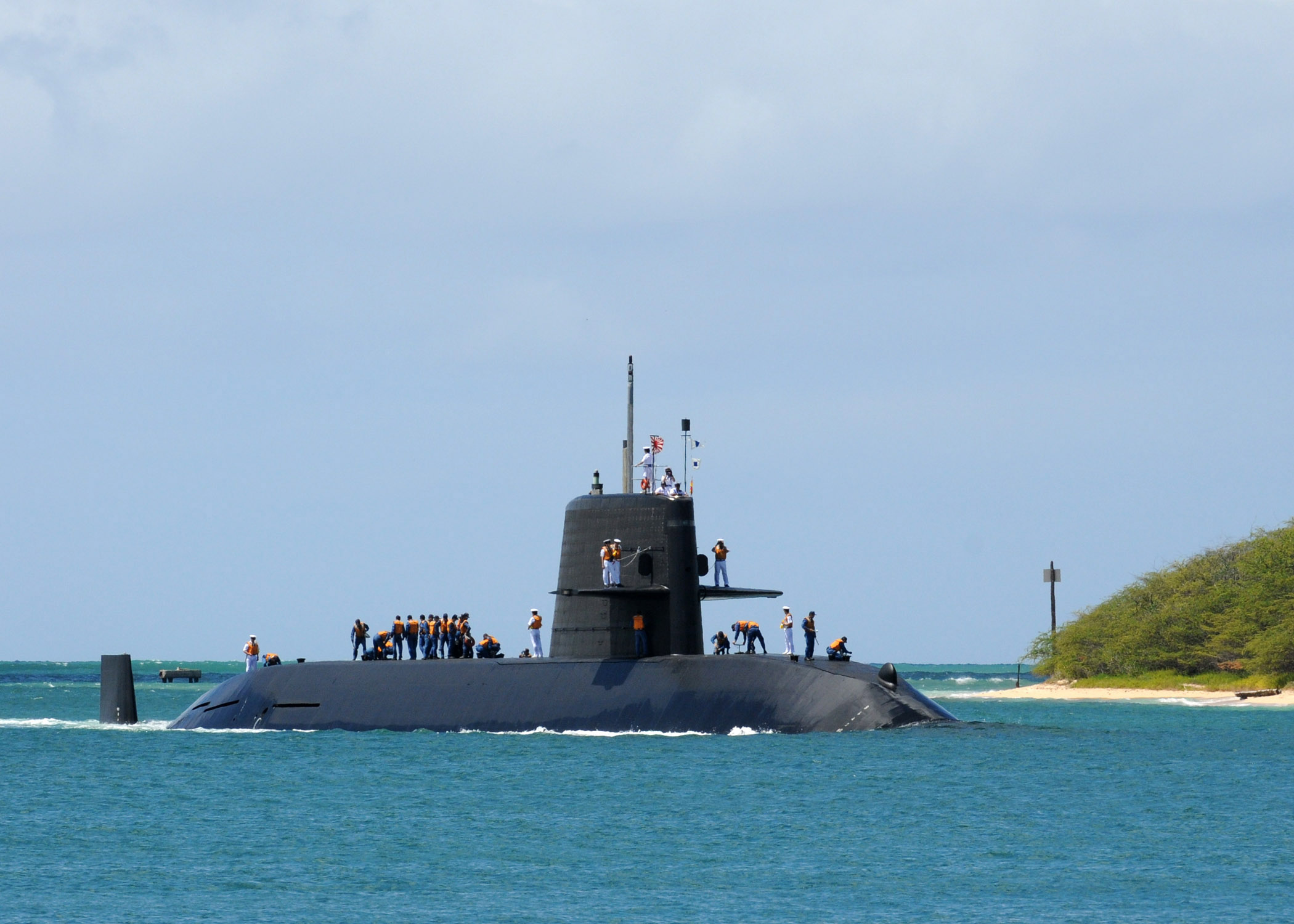
JS Mochisio entering Pearl Harbor on 21 June 2010.

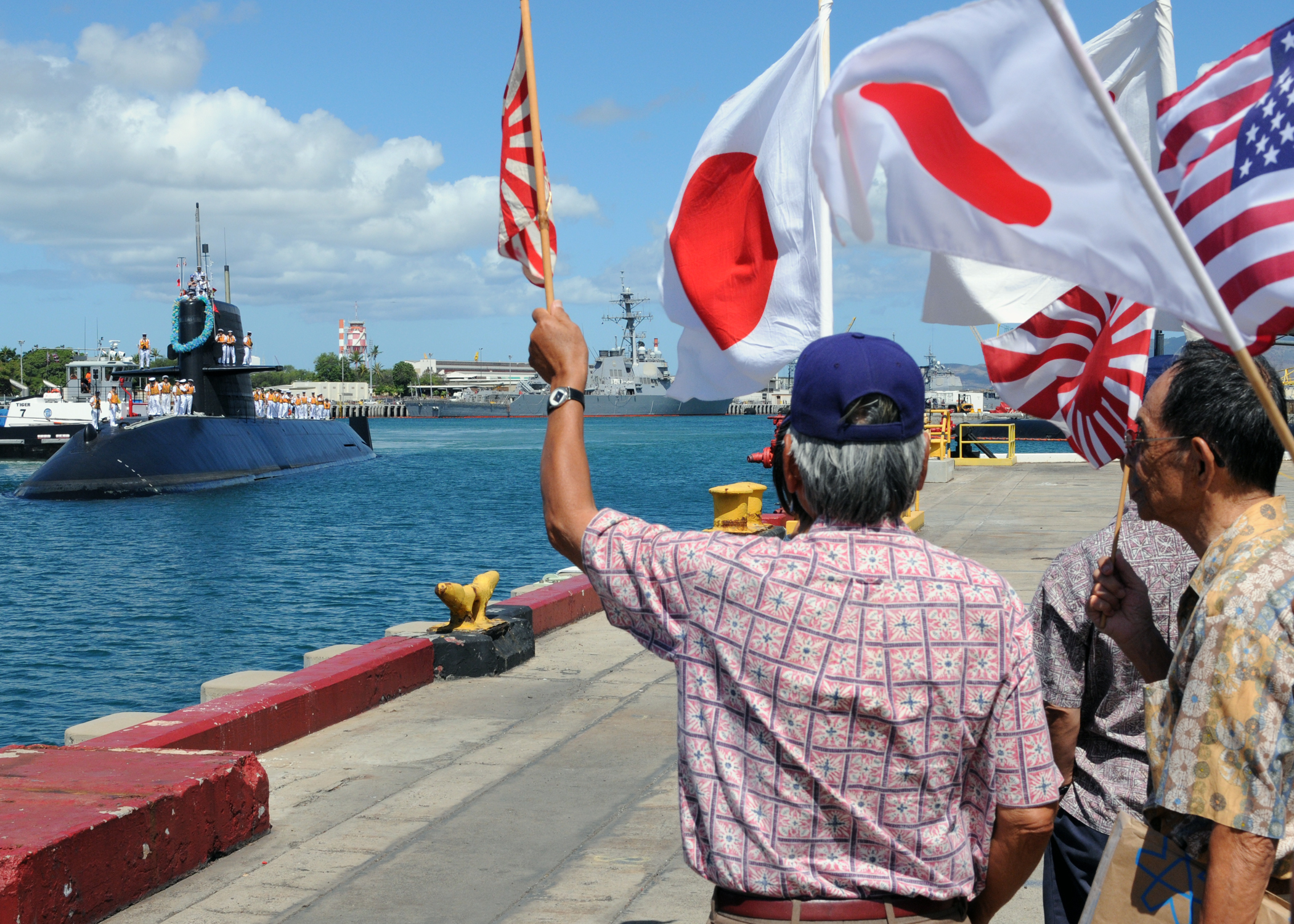
JS Mochisio arriving at Pearl Harbor on 21 June 2010.

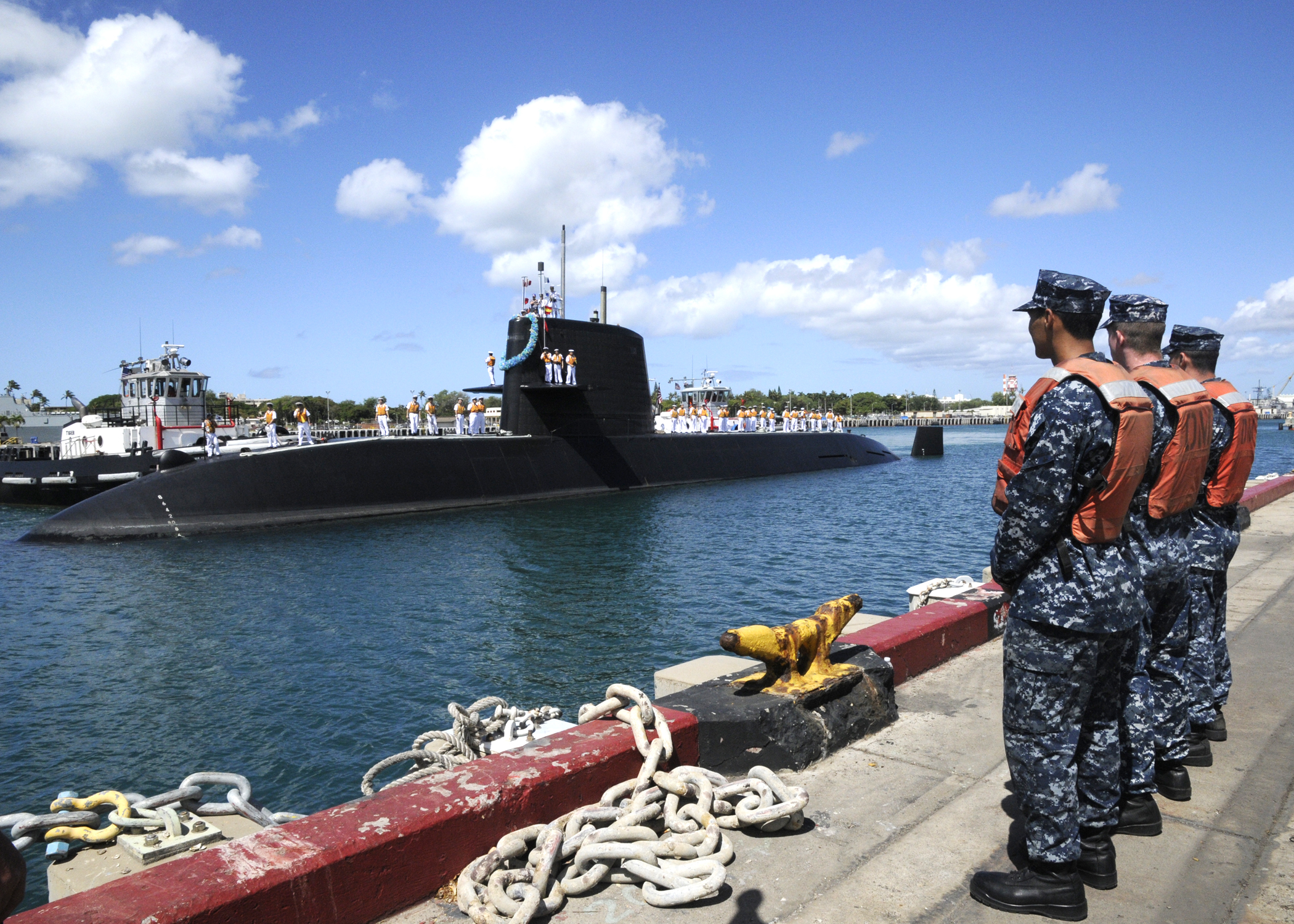
JS Mochisio arriving at Pearl Harbor on 21 June 2010.

JS Mochisio arriving at Pearl Harbor on 21 June 2010.

JS Mochisio underway during RIMPAC 2010 on 24 July 2010.

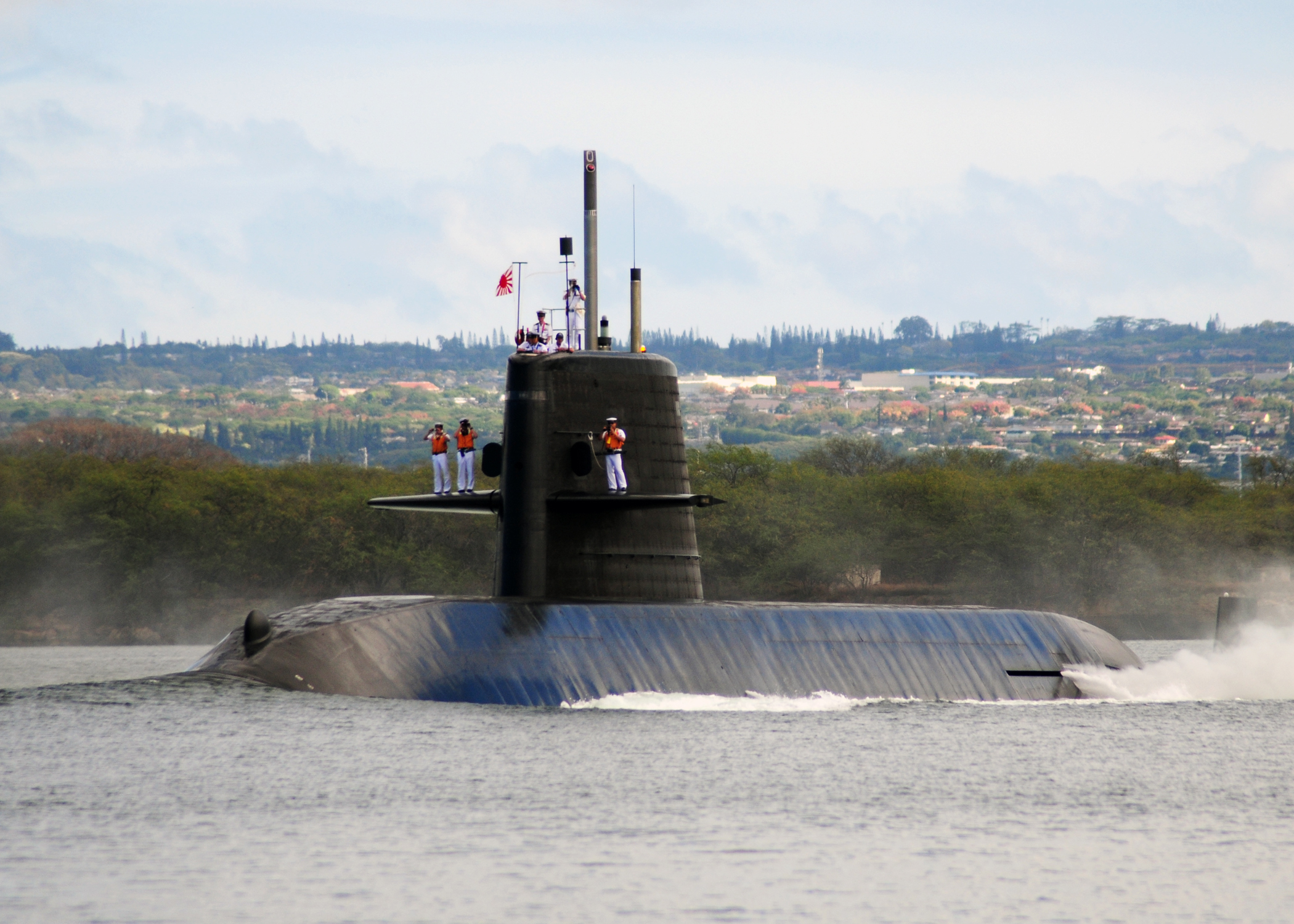
JS Mochisio leaving Pearl Harbor on 6 July 2010.

JS Mochisio leaving Pearl Harbor on 6 July 2010.
