= JS Isoshio =

Oyashio-class submarines

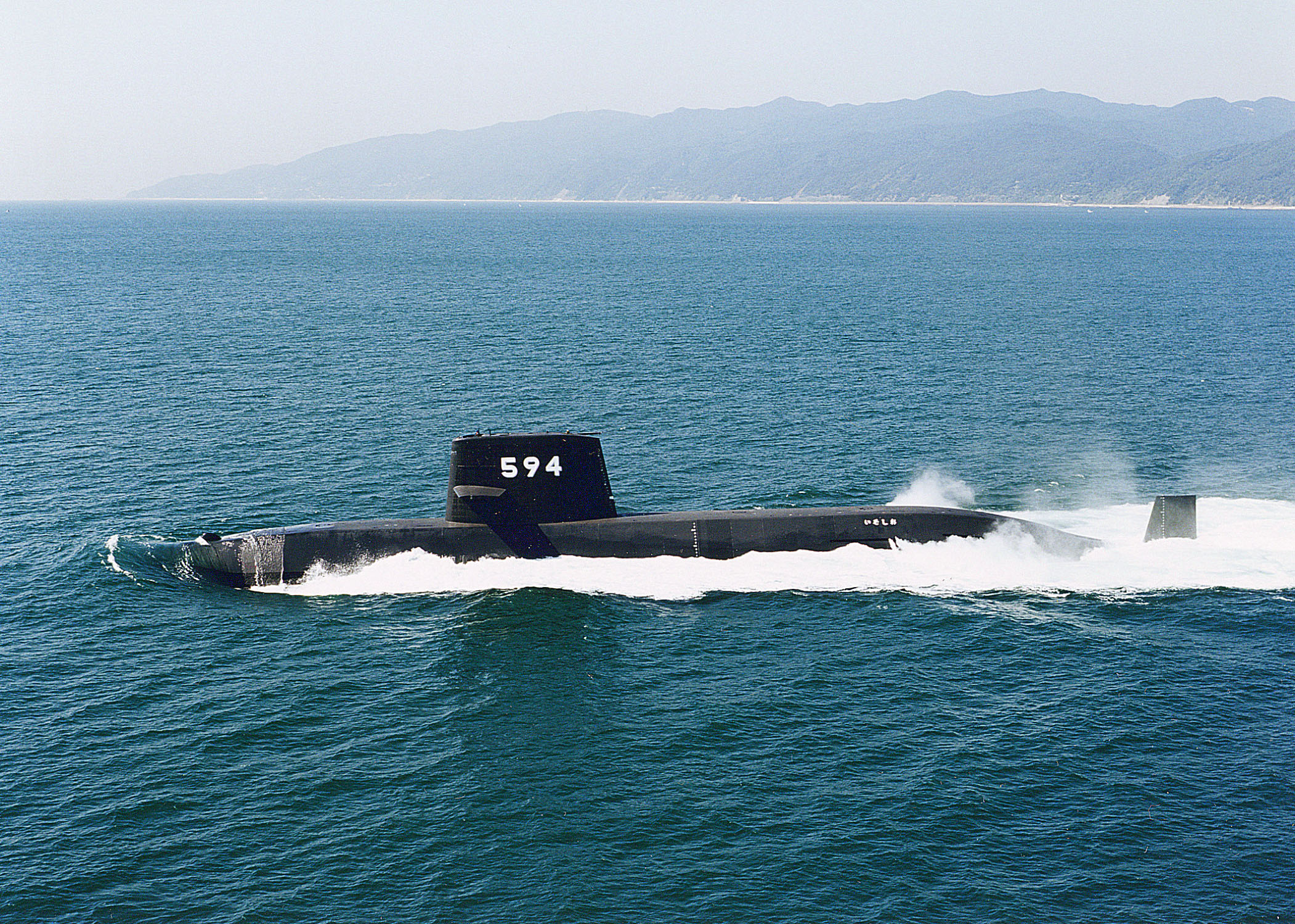
- JS Isoshio

History

Japan
- Name: Isoshio; (いそしお)
- Ordered: 1997
- Builder: Kawasaki, Kobe
- Cost: ¥52.19 million
- Laid down: 9 March 1998
- Launched: 27 November 2000
- Commissioned: 14 March 2002
- Home port: Kure
- Identification: Pennant number: SS-594
- Status: Active

General characteristics
- Class & type: Oyashio-class submarine
- Displacement: 2,750 tonnes (surfaced); 4,000 tonnes (submerged)
- Length: 81.7 m (268 ft 1 in)
- Beam: 8.9 m (29 ft 2 in)
- Draught: 7.4 m (24 ft 3 in)
- Propulsion: Diesel-electric; 2 Kawasaki 12V25S diesel engines; 2 Kawasaki alternators; 2 Toshiba motors; 3,400 hp (2,500 kW) surfaced; 7,750 hp (5,780 kW) submerged
- Speed: 12 knots (22 km/h; 14 mph) (surfaced); 20 knots (37 km/h; 23 mph) (submerged)
- Complement: 70 (10 officers)
- Sensors & processing systems: Sonar: Hughes/Oki ZQQ-6 hull-mounted sonar, flank arrays, 1 towed array; Radar: JRC ZPS 6 I-band search radar.
- Armament: 6 × HU-605 21 in (533 mm) torpedo tubes with 20 reloads for: Type 89 torpedoes; UGM-84 Harpoon missiles

JS Isoshio (SS-594) is the fifth boat of the Oyashio-class submarines built for the Japan Maritime Self-Defense Force. She was commissioned on 14 March 2002.

With 24 years of active service, Isoshio is the oldest Oyashio-class boat still in active service, the other four all having been reassigned as training vessels or decommissioned.

== Construction and career ==
Isoshio was laid down at Kawasaki Heavy Industries Kobe Shipyard on 9 March 1998 and launched on 27 November 2000. She was commissioned on 14 March 2002 and deployed to Kure.

On 30 July 2003, she left Kure for RIMPAC 2003 in the United States and returned to Kure in late October.

== Gallery ==
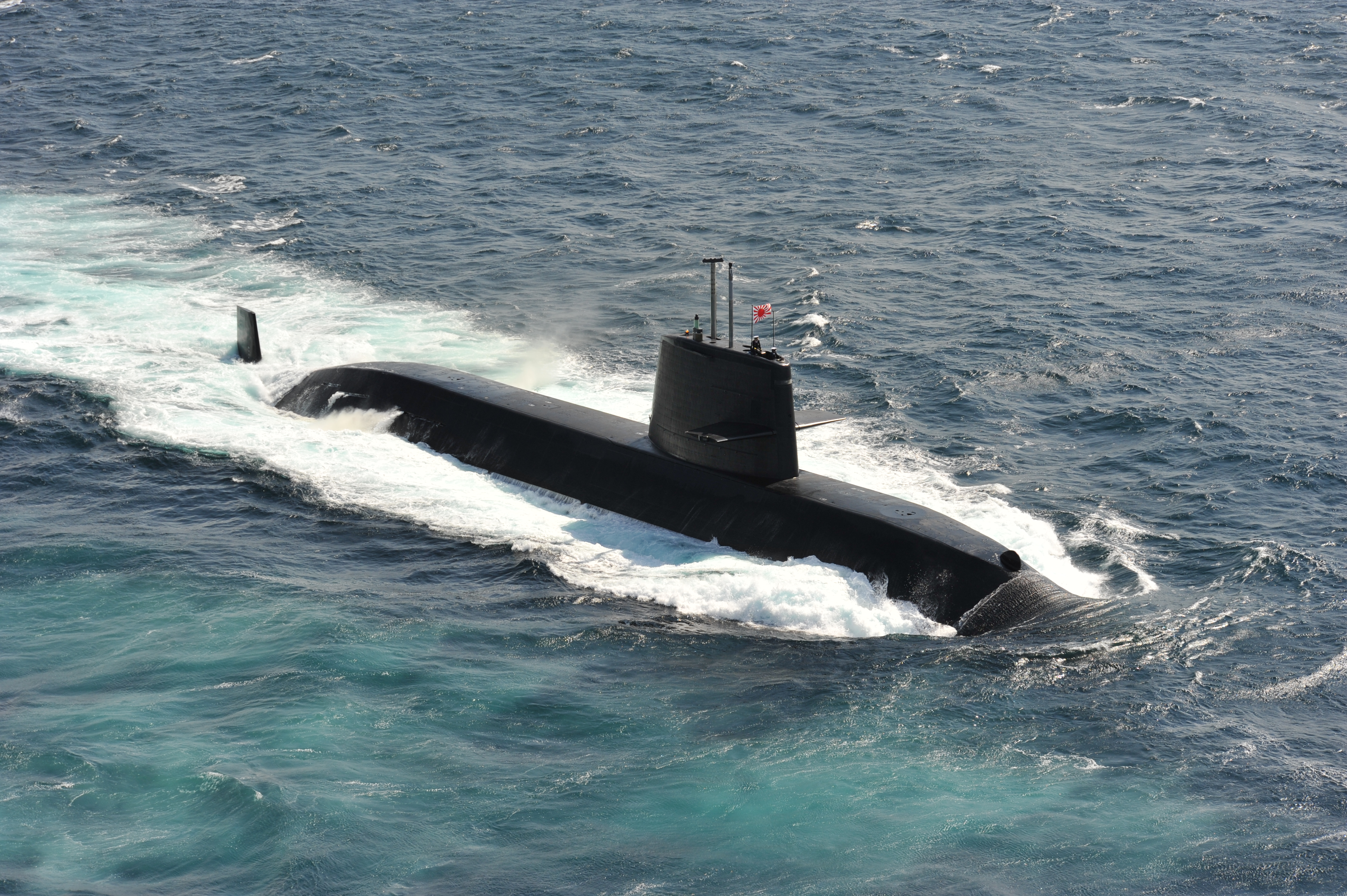
JS Isoshio underway.

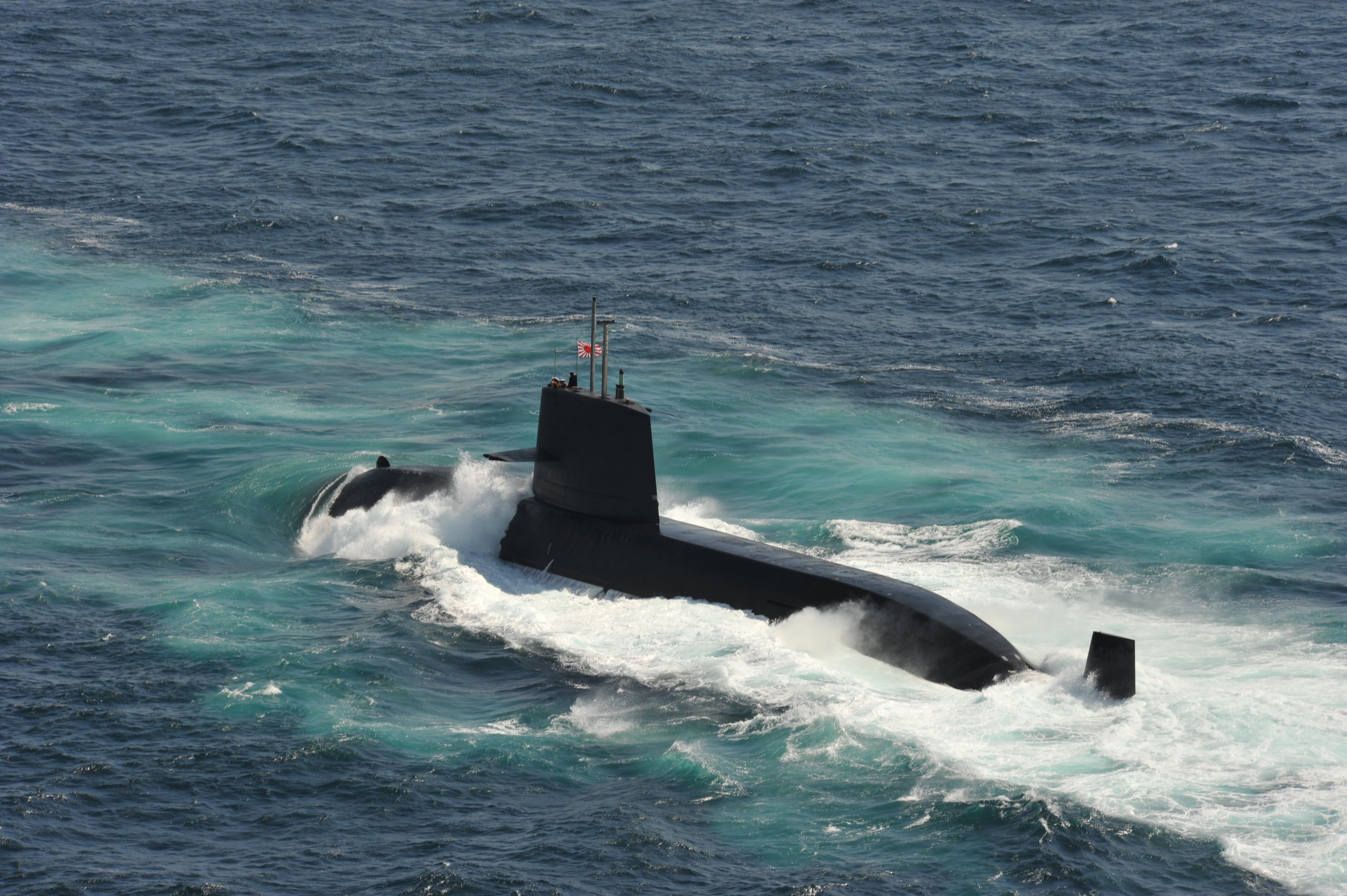
JS Isoshio underway.

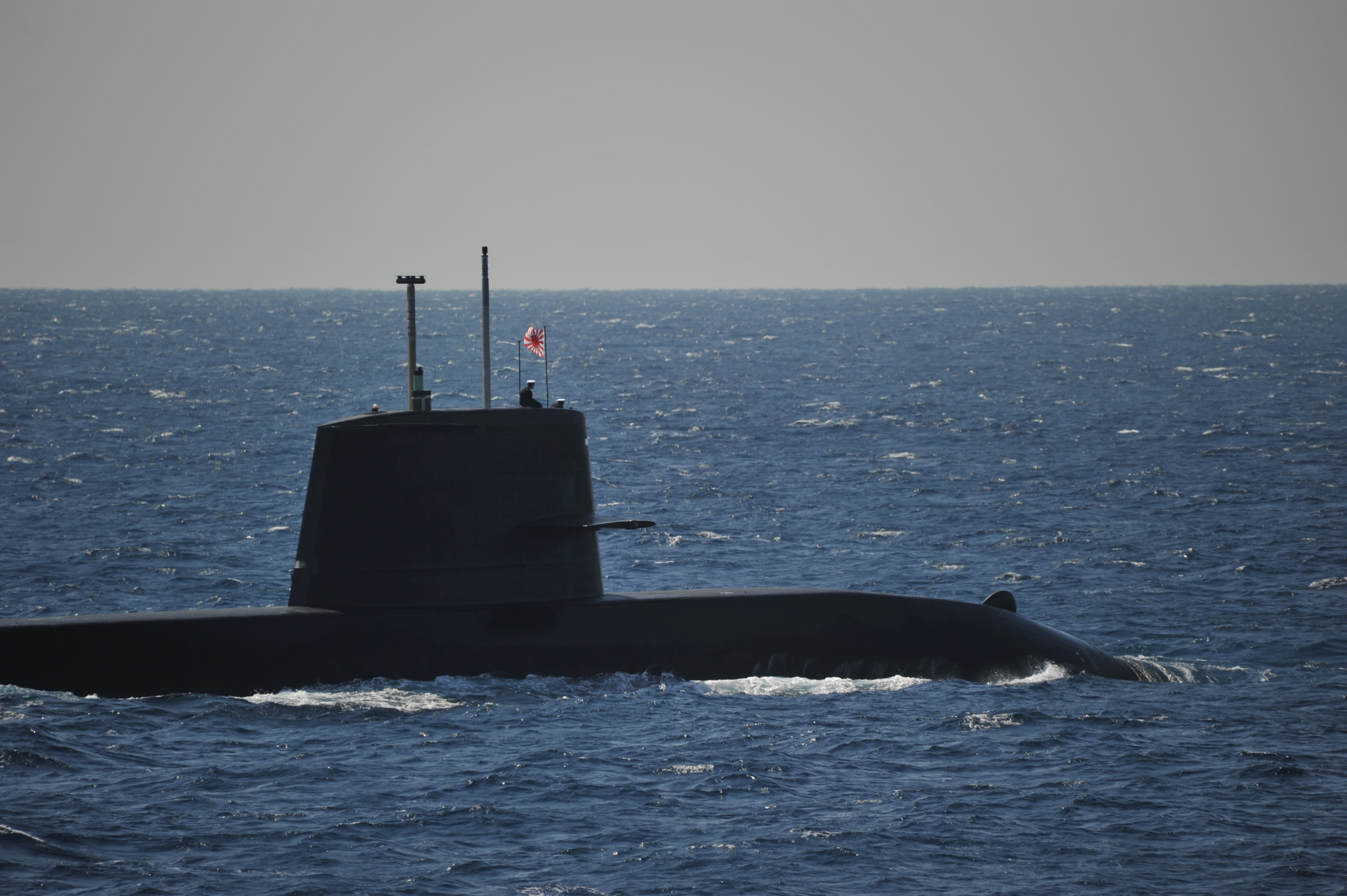
JS Isoshio underway.

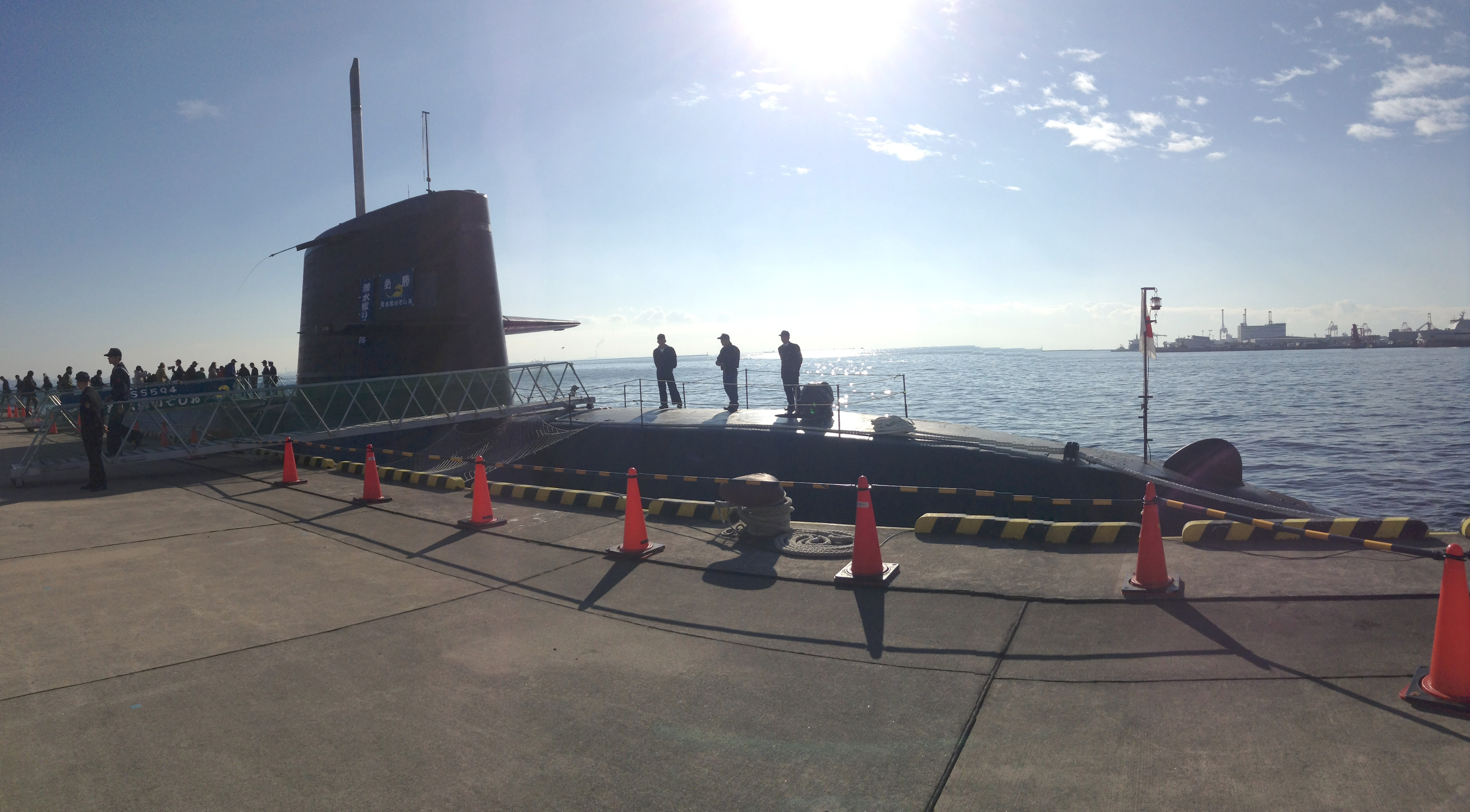
JS Isoshio on 11 December 2016.
