= Oyashio-class submarine =

Japansese submarine class

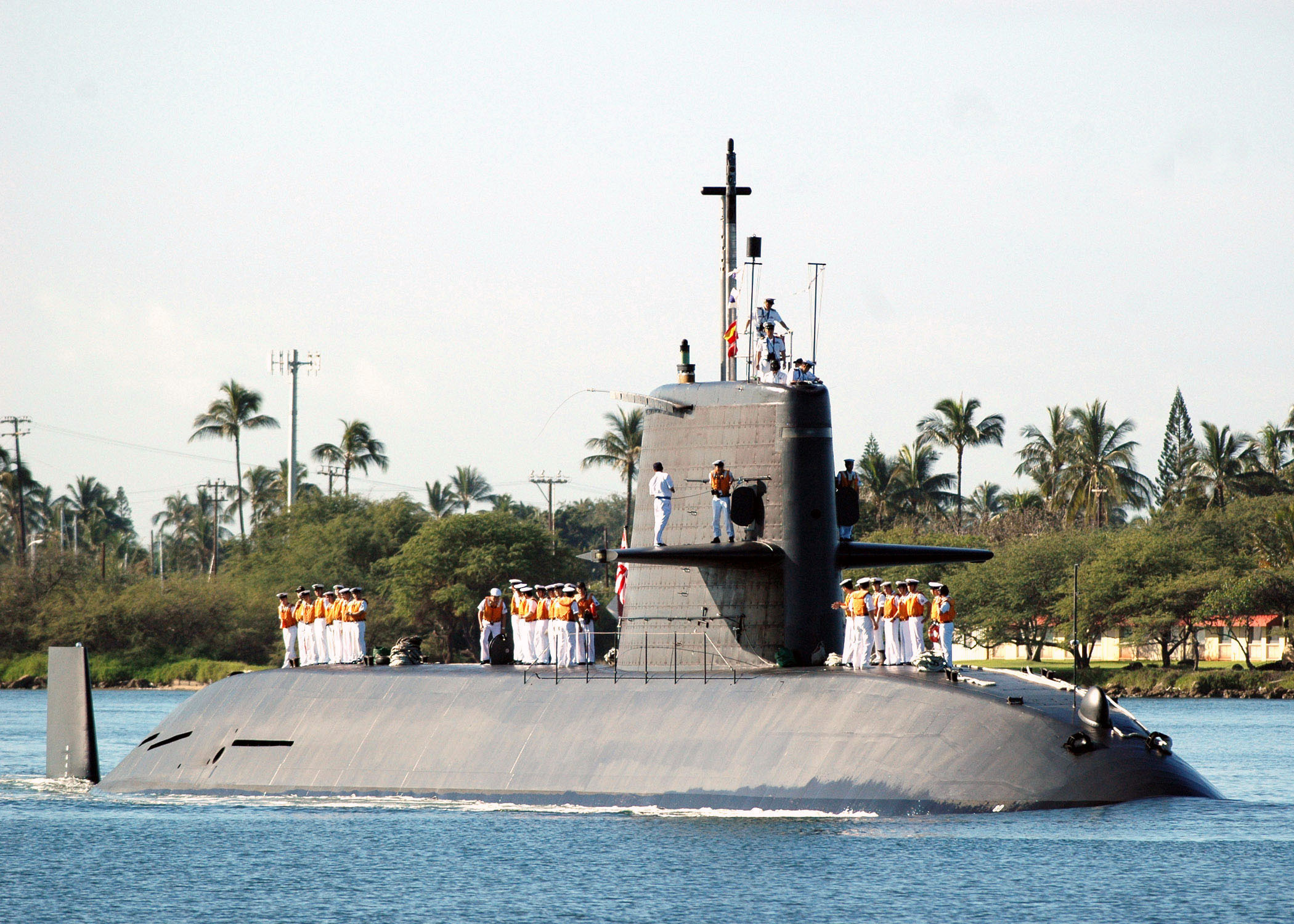
- Oyashio at Pearl Harbor in 2006

Class overview
- Name: Oyashio (おやしお, Oyashio Current)
- Builders: Kawasaki Shipbuilding Corporation; Mitsubishi Heavy Industries
- Operators: Japan Maritime Self-Defense Force
- Preceded by: Harushio class
- Succeeded by: Sōryū class
- Built: 1994–2008
- In commission: 1998–present
- Planned: 11
- Completed: 11
- Active: 8 (2 converted to training ships)
- Retired: 3

General characteristics
- Type: Attack submarine
- Displacement: 2,750 tonnes (surfaced); 3,500 tonnes (submerged)
- Length: 81.7 m (268 ft 1 in)
- Beam: 8.9 m (29 ft 2 in)
- Draught: 7.4 m (24 ft 3 in)
- Propulsion: Diesel-electric; 2 Kawasaki 12V25S diesel engines; 2 Kawasaki alternators; 2 Toshiba motors; 3,400 hp (2,500 kW) surfaced; 7,750 hp (5,780 kW) submerged
- Speed: 12 knots (22 km/h; 14 mph) (surfaced); 20 knots (37 km/h; 23 mph) (submerged)
- Complement: 70 (10 officers)
- Sensors & processing systems: Sonar: Hughes/Oki ZQQ-6 hull-mounted sonar, flank arrays, 1 towed array; Radar: JRC ZPS 6 I-band search radar.
- Armament: 6 × HU-605 21 in (533 mm) torpedo tubes with 20 reloads for: Type 89 torpedoes; UGM-84 Harpoon missiles

The Oyashio class is a series of Japanese diesel-electric attack submarines operated by the JMSDF. The submarines entered service in the late 1990s. The submarines are larger than the earlier Harushio class, to provide space for a flank sonar array.

== Boats ==
There are a total of 11 boats in the class - the last boat was commissioned in 2008. Oyashio, Michishio, and Kuroshio share their names with World War II destroyers. Takashio shares a name with a ship from the third set of Yūgumo-class destroyers, of which none were built.

The first two boats, Oyashio and Michishio along with the Makishio, have since been converted to training platforms.

On 1 February 2018, the Ministry of Defence's Maritime Staff Office revealed that seven of the service's 82-metre (269 ft 0 in) Oyashio-class submarines, which have a surface displacement of 2,800 tonnes, have already completed service-life extension work to date. The seven boats received extensive refits during their second and third maintenance cycles, which have been planned to bring the vessels to "almost the same level of that of the latest model Sōryū-class submarine, while extending their service lives.

Project no.	Building no.	Pennant no.	Name	Japanese	Laid down	Launched	Commissioned	Decommissioned	Shipyard	Note
S130	8105	SS-590; TSS-3608	Oyashio	おやしお	26 January 1994	15 October 1996	16 March 1998	17 March 2023	Kawasaki Shipbuilding Corporation, Kobe	Converted to training submarine (TSS-3608) on 6 March 2015
S130	8106	SS-591; TSS-3609	Michishio	みちしお	16 February 1995	18 September 1997	10 March 1999	14 March 2025	Mitsubishi Heavy Industries, Kobe	Converted to training submarine (TSS-3609) on 27 February 2017
S130	8107	SS-592	Uzushio	うずしお	6 March 1996	26 November 1998	9 March 2000	19 December 2025	Kawasaki Shipbuilding Corporation, Kobe	
S130	8108	SS-593; TSS-3610	Makishio	まきしお	6 March 1996	26 November 1998	29 March 2001		Mitsubishi Heavy Industries, Kobe	Converted to training submarine TSS-3610 on 17 March 2023
S130	8109	SS-594; TSS-3611	Isoshio	いそしお	9 March 1998	27 November 2000	14 March 2002		Kawasaki Shipbuilding Corporation, Kobe	Converted to training submarine TSS-3611 on 14 March 2025
S130	8110	SS-595	Narushio	なるしお	2 April 1999	4 October 2001	3 March 2003		Mitsubishi Heavy Industries, Kobe	
S130	8111	SS-596	Kuroshio	くろしお	27 March 2000	23 October 2002	8 March 2004		Kawasaki Shipbuilding Corporation, Kobe	
S130	8112	SS-597	Takashio	たかしお	30 January 2001	1 October 2003	9 March 2005		Mitsubishi Heavy Industries, Kobe	
S130	8113	SS-598	Yaeshio	やえしお	15 January 2002	4 November 2004	9 March 2006		Kawasaki Shipbuilding Corporation, Kobe	
S130	8114	SS-599	Setoshio	せとしお	23 January 2003	5 October 2005	28 February 2007		Mitsubishi Heavy Industries, Kobe	
S130	8115	SS-600	Mochishio	もちしお	23 February 2004	6 November 2006	6 March 2008		Kawasaki Shipbuilding Corporation, Kobe	

== Gallery ==
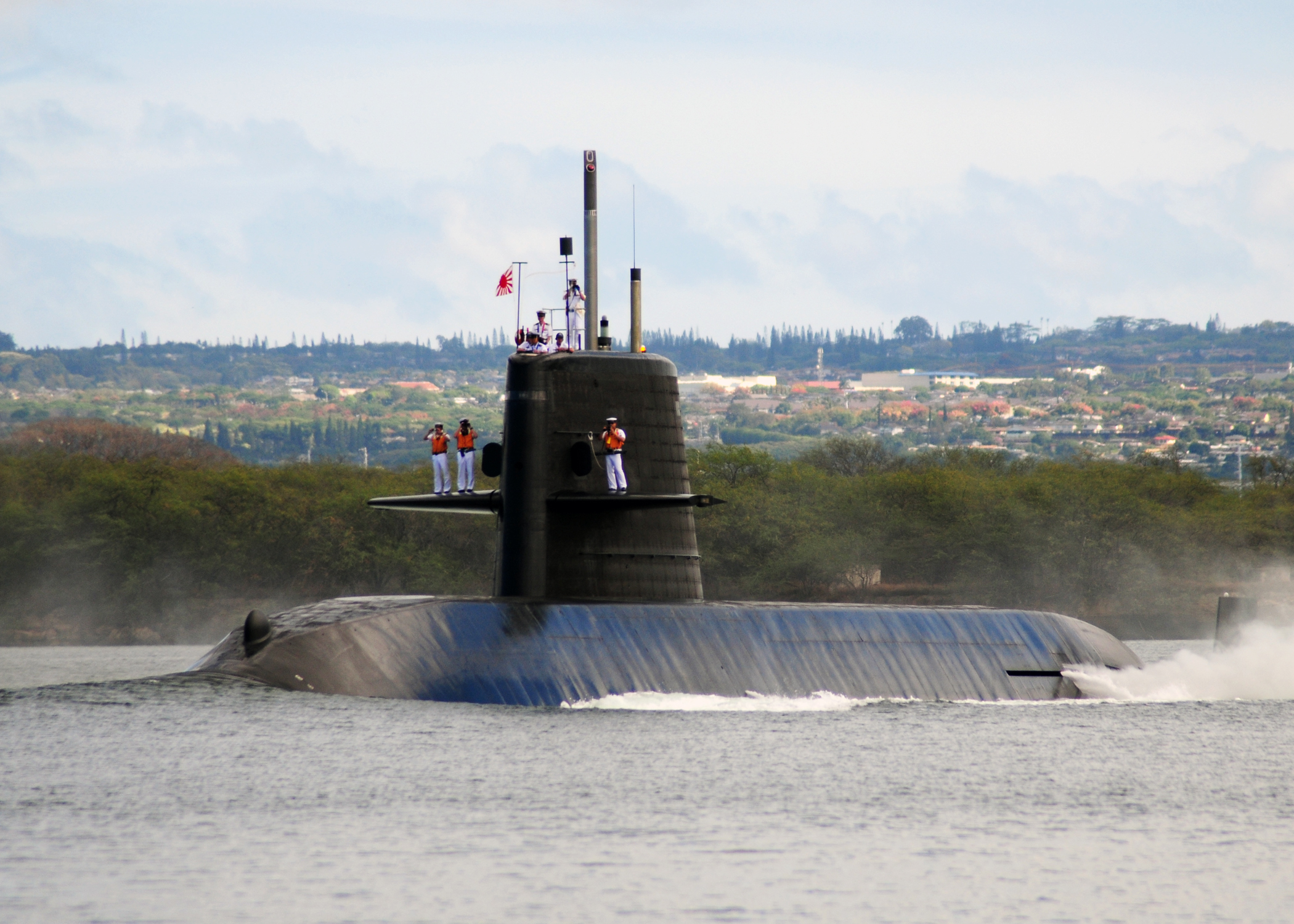
JS Mochisio (SS 600) departs Joint Base Pearl Harbor–Hickam to support Rim of the Pacific (RIMPAC) 2010 exercises.

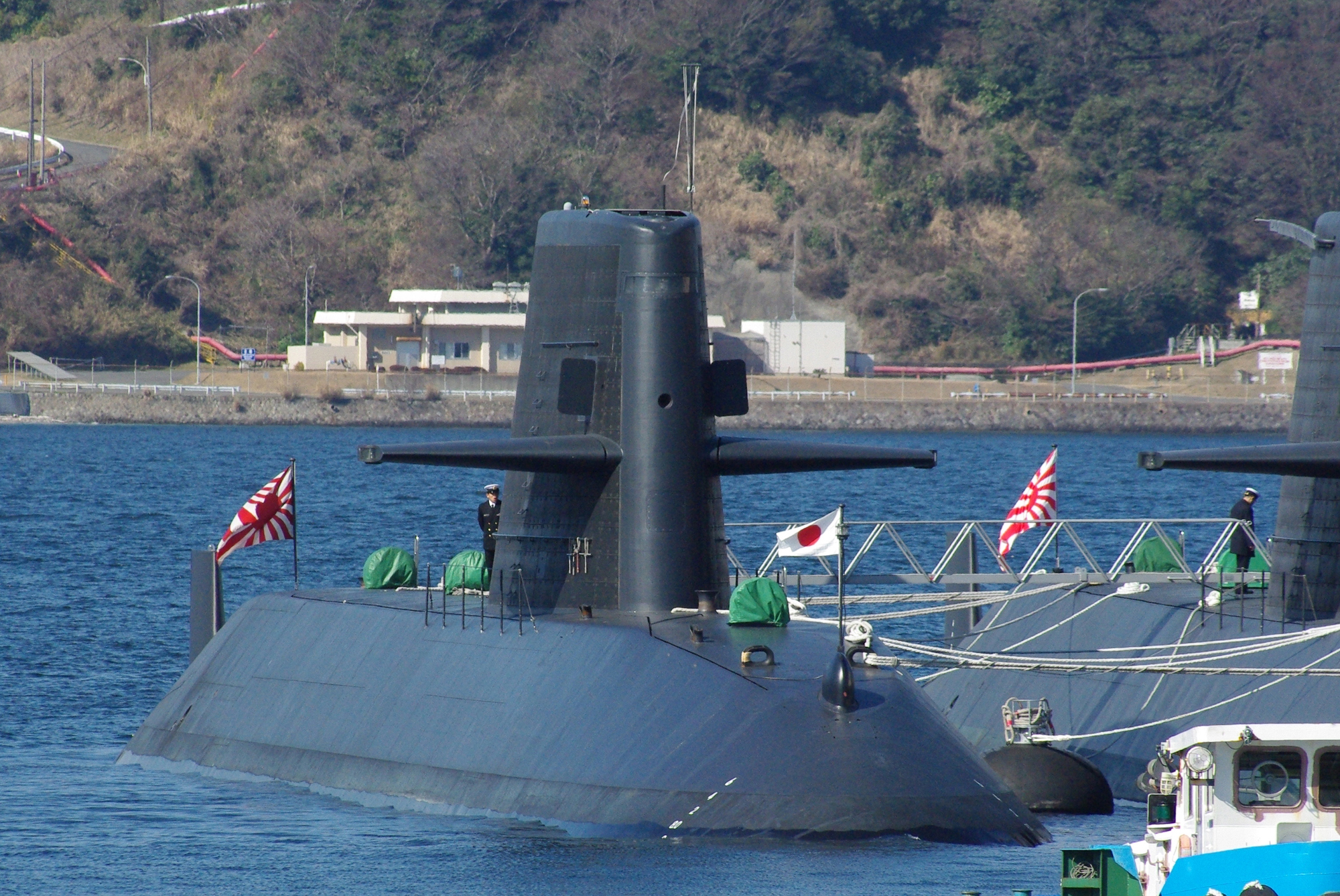
Oyashio-class submarine.

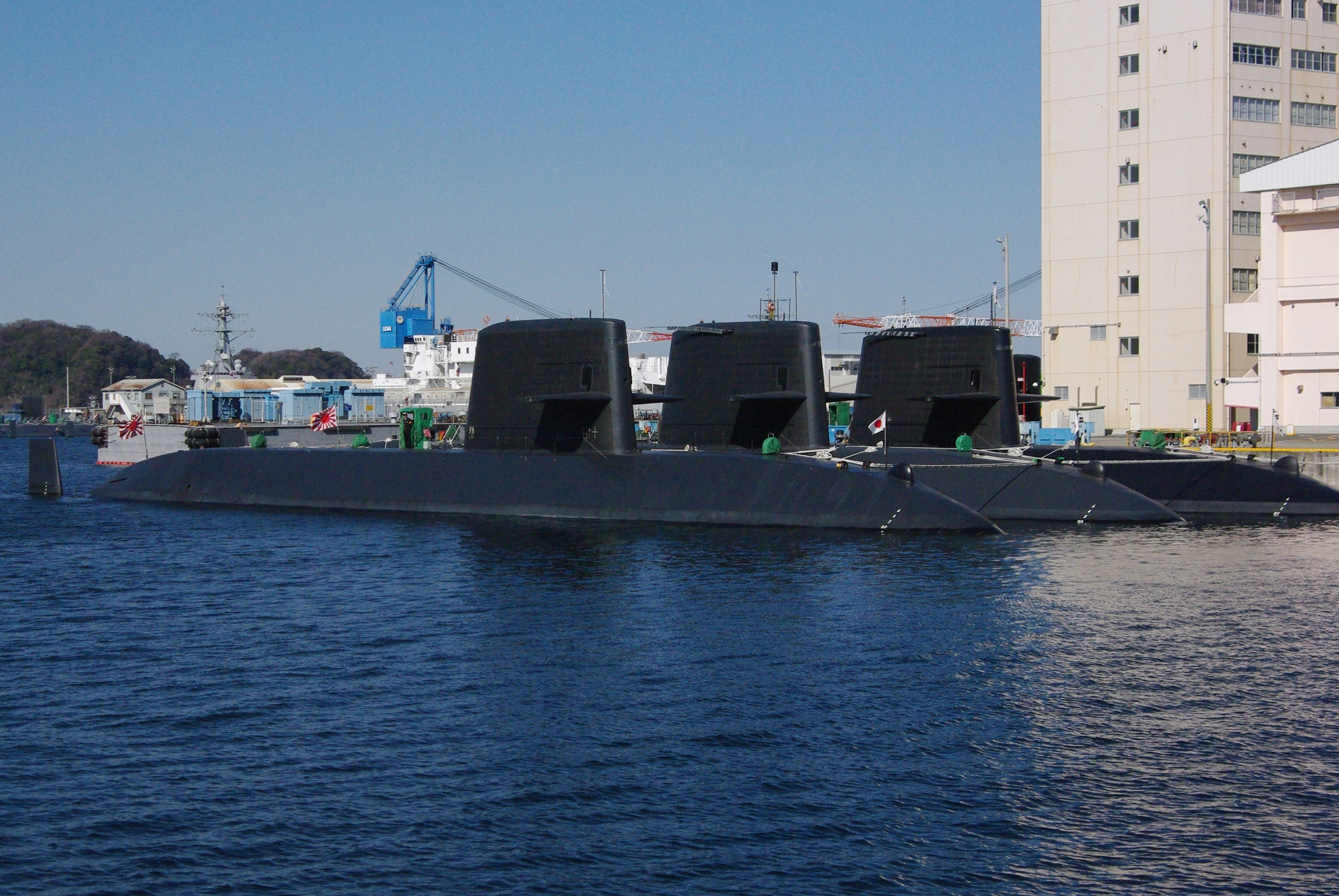
Oyashio-class submarine.

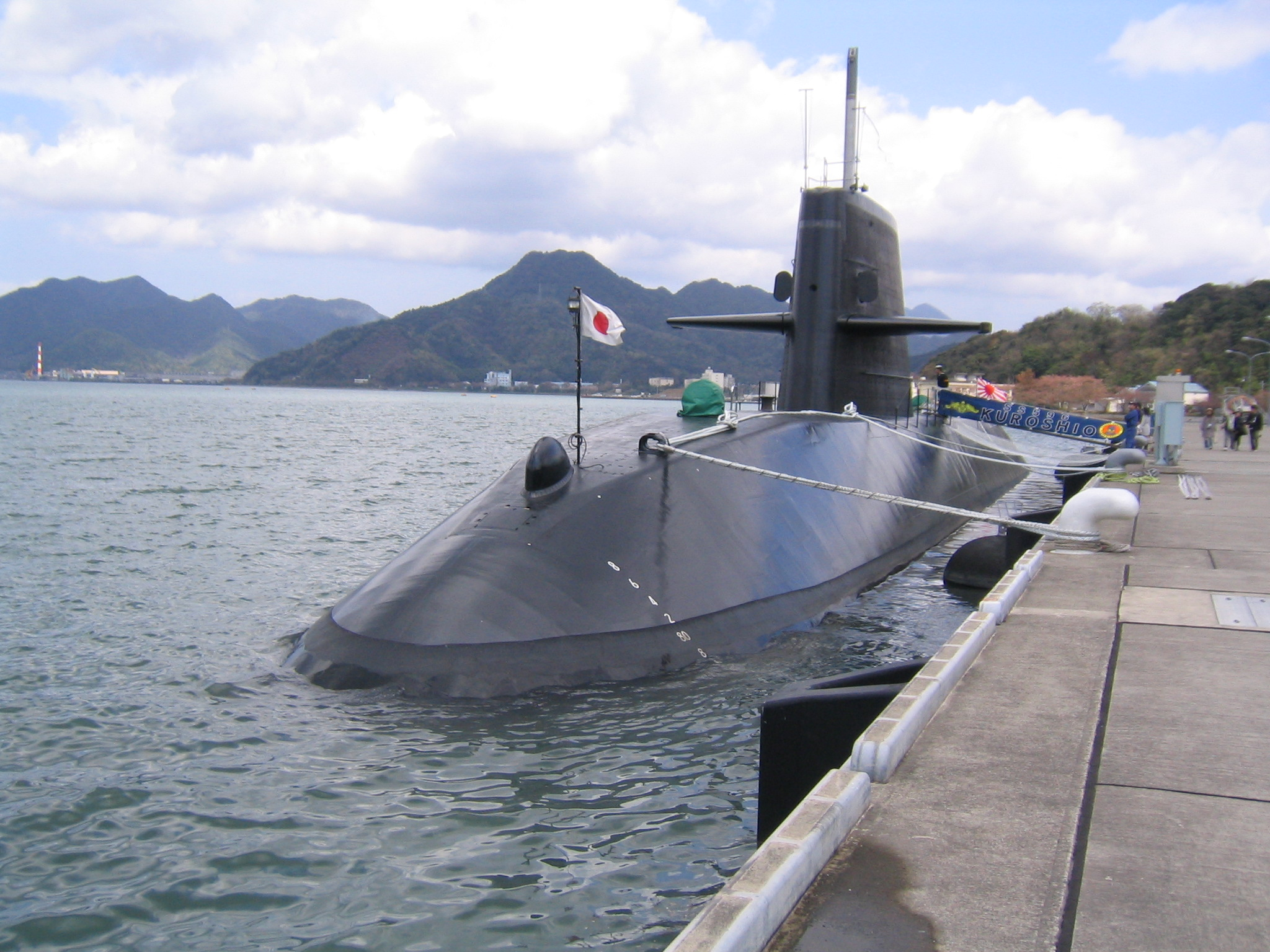
JS Kuroshio (SS 596) at the Maizuru Naval Base.

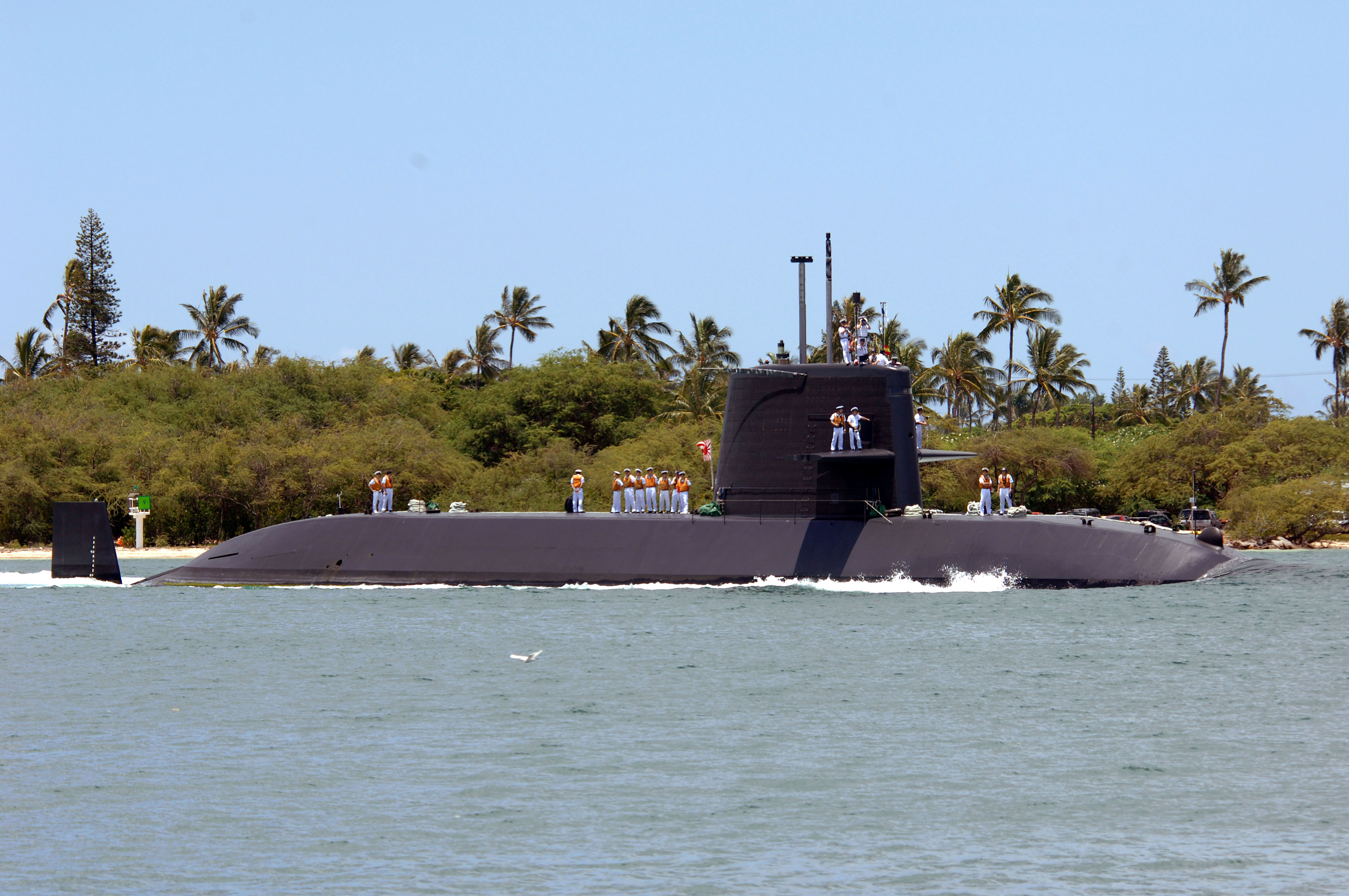
JS Narushio (SS 595) pulls into Pearl Harbor for a scheduled port call before starting Rim of the Pacific (RIMPAC) 2008.

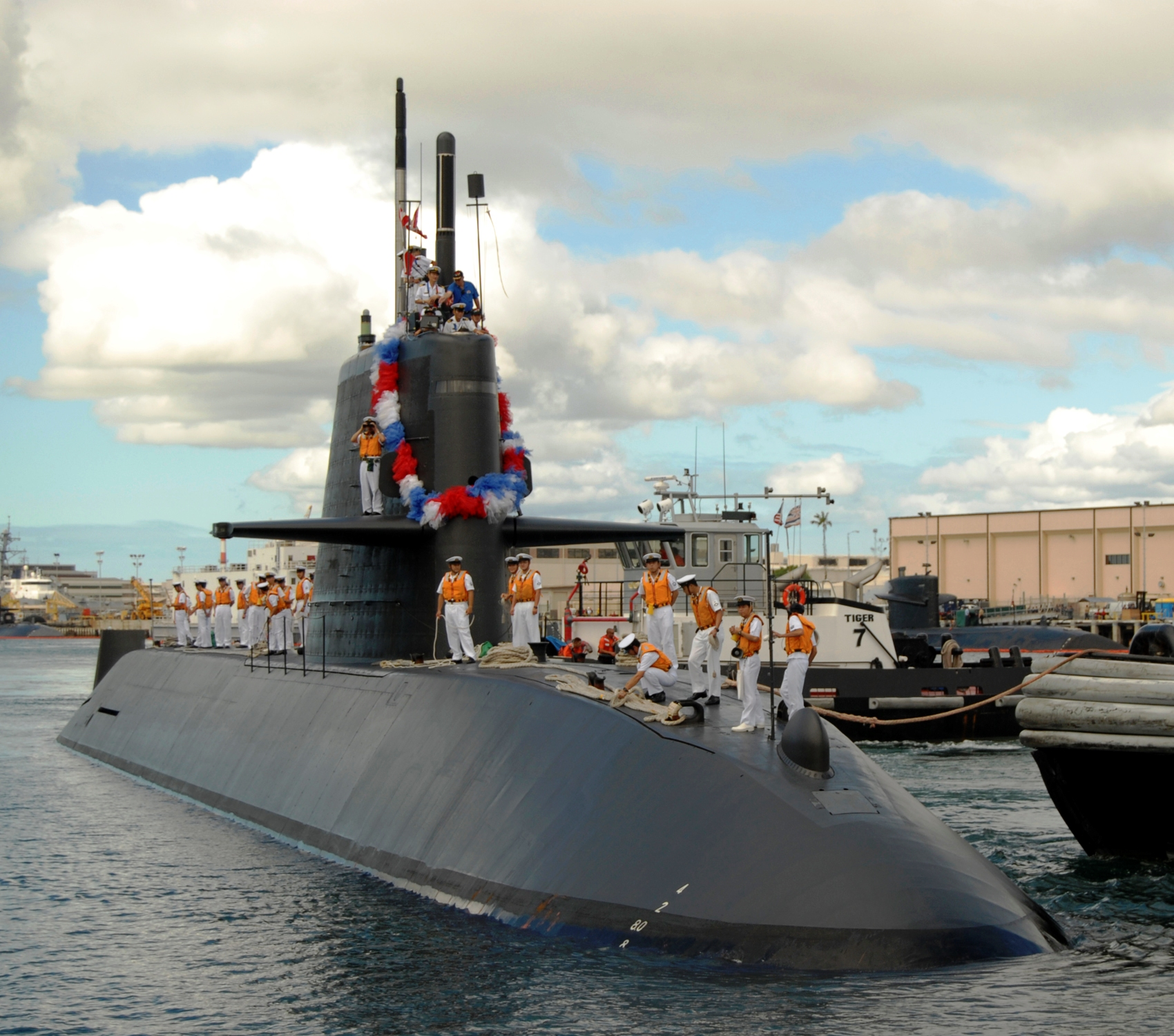
JS Yaeshio (SS 598) arrives at Naval Station Pearl Harbor for an annual training exercise.

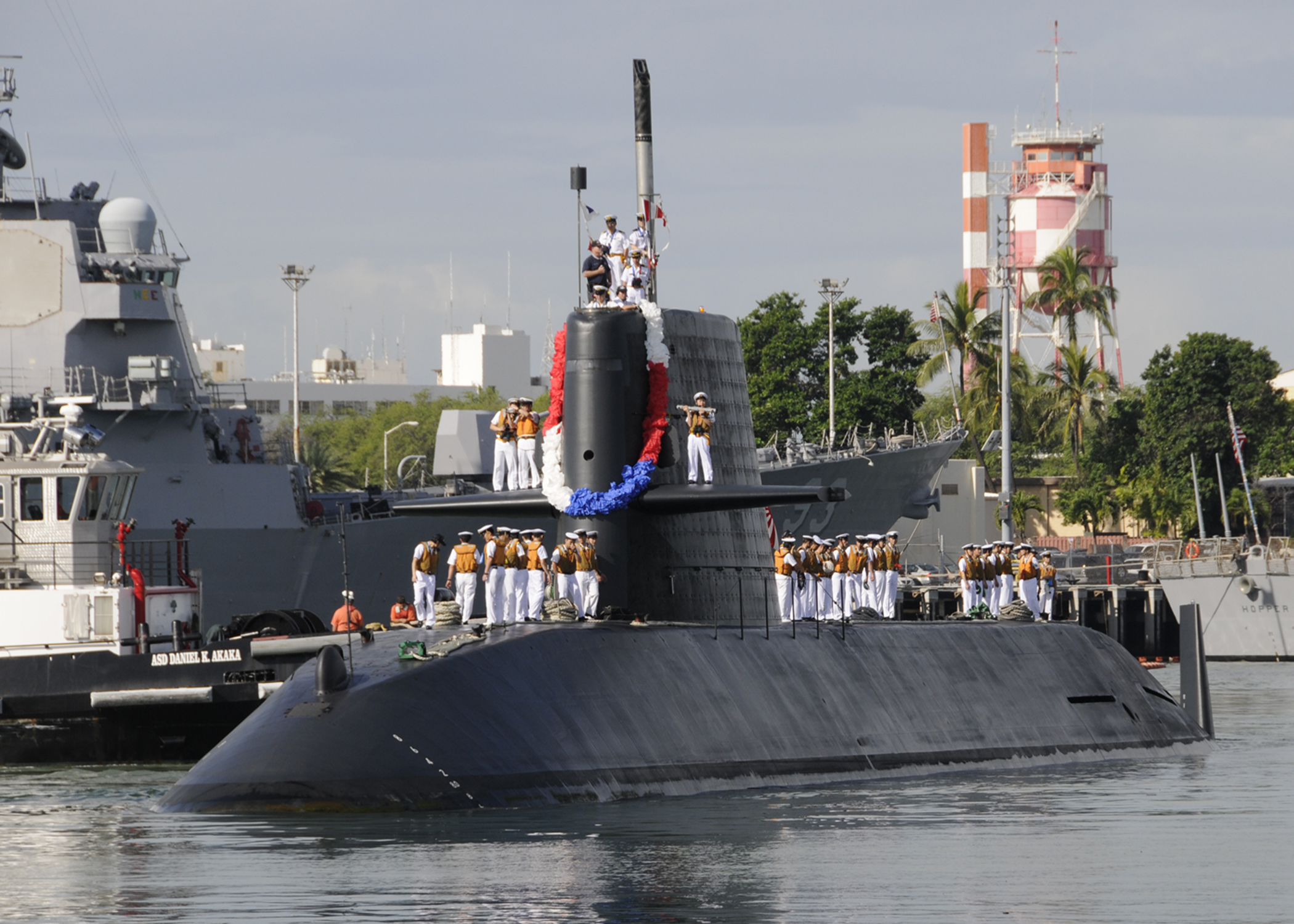
JS Uzushio (SS 592) arrives at Joint Base Pearl Harbor–Hickam to begin their annual training exercise.

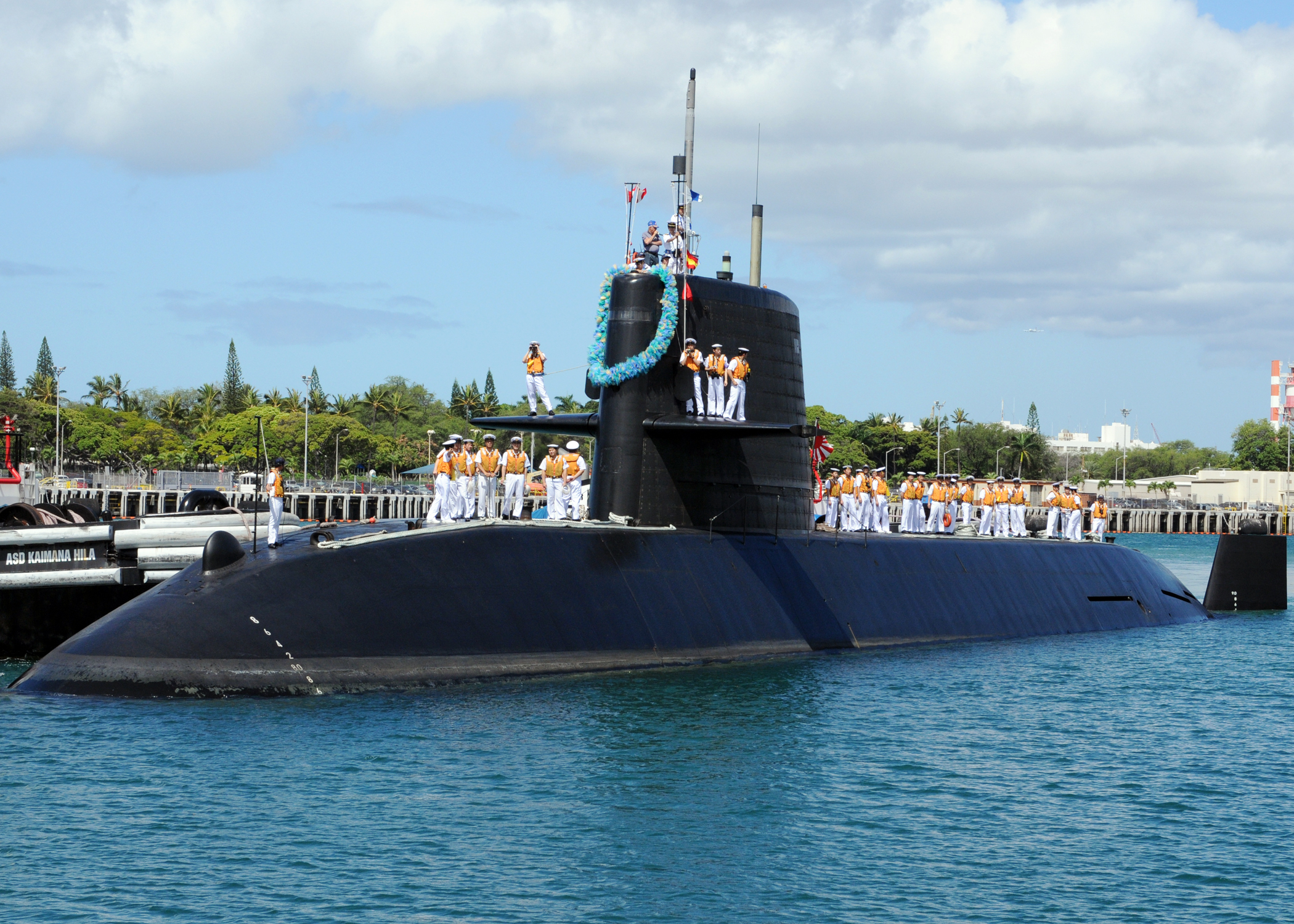
JS Mochishio (SS 600) arrives at Joint Base Pearl Harbor–Hickam to support Rim of the Pacific (RIMPAC) exercises.

Oyashio-class submarine profile

== See also ==
- List of submarine classes in service

Equivalent submarines of the same era

- Walrus class
- Collins class
- Project 636
- Hai Lung class
- Upholder/Victoria class
