= AN/SQS-23 =

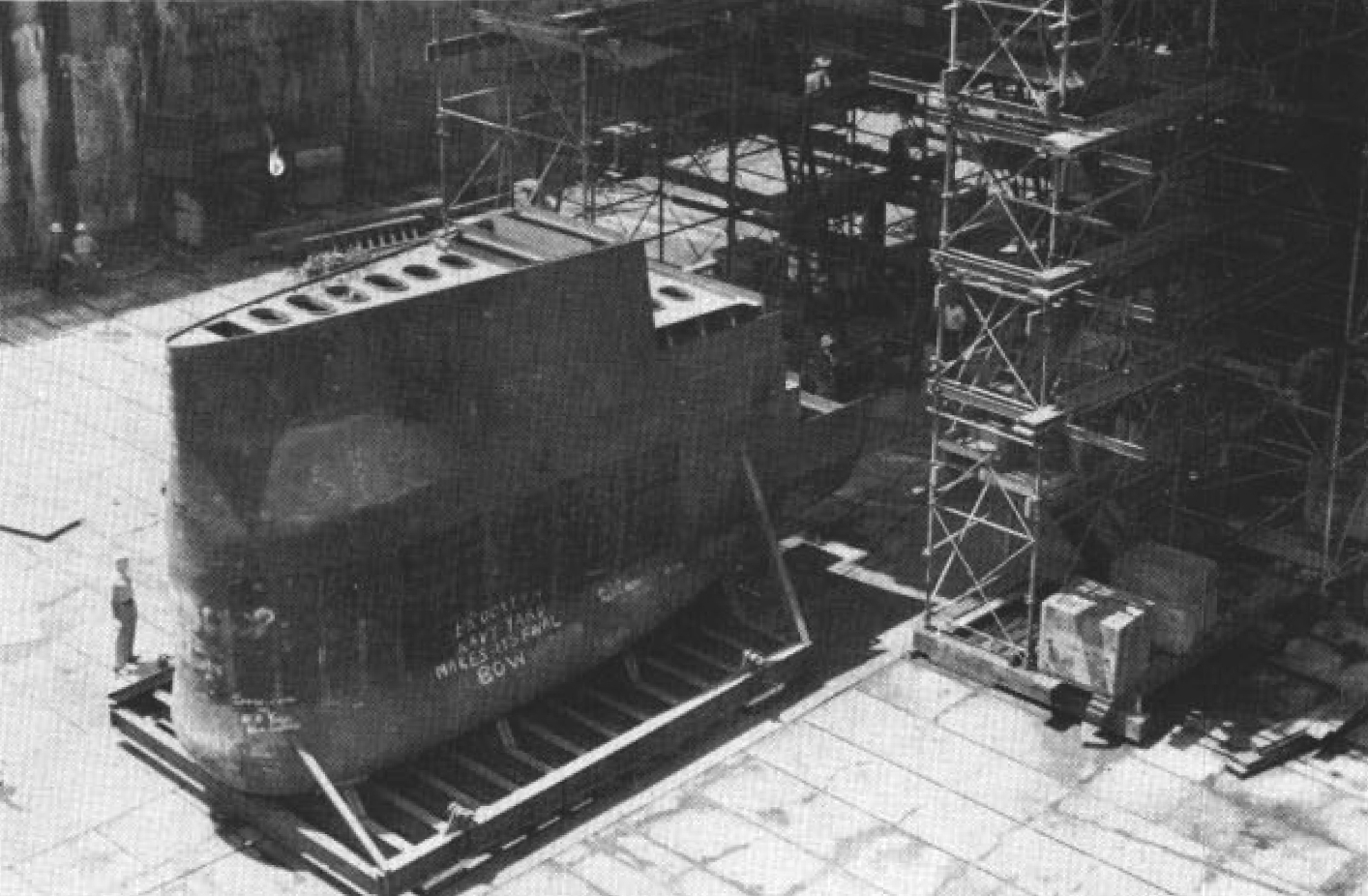
SQS-23 bow sonar for USS Intrepid (CVS-11) at Brooklyn Navy Yard 1965

The AN/SQS-23 was a United States Navy surface ship, bow-mounted sonar introduced in 1958. It was most notably used onboard the Charles F. Adams-class, Farragut-class, and FRAM I Gearing-class destroyers, and the anti-submarine warfare Essex-class aircraft carriers.

== Design ==
The AN/SQS-23 is a scaled-up AN/SQS-29, which is, in turn, a development of the AN/SQS-4. It operates at a lower frequency, in the 5 kilohertz range as opposed to 10 kilohertz for the An/SQS-4 and 8 kilohertz for the AN/SQS-29, which allows for greater range at the cost of a larger transducer array.

The AN/SQS-23 uses the TR-208 transducer element. It contains 432 elements arranged in 48 staves of 9 elements each, in a cylindrical array 60 in (150 cm) tall and 72 in (180 cm) in diameter. Operational frequency is 5 kilohertz.

== AN/SQQ-23 ==
A two-phased program to upgrade the AN/SQS-23 was started in 1965, consisting of the Test Reliability and Maintainability (TRAM) improvement program, which split the transmitter into eight groups, each driving one stave, and Performance And Integration Retrofit (PAIR). When both systems are installed, the system is designated the AN/SQQ-23.

=== Performance Integration and Retrofit (PAIR) ===
Dual Display Console for AN/SQQ-23 / PAIR

Diagram of a representative AN SQQ-23 installation onboard a Gearing-class destroyer

The Performance And Integration Retrofit (PAIR) upgrade completely replaces the receiver group, adds a second sonar dome 60 ft (10 fathoms) back from the first, and adds a second operator console.

SQQ-23 / PAIR utilizes pressurized rubber sonar domes instead of the steel sonar domes used on the original SQS-23, improving the transmission characteristics and reducing noise.

On a (PAIR-less) AN/SQS-23 system, the passive mode uses the same receiver system as the active system, and it is not possible to use both modes simultaneously. On the AN/SQQ-23, the passive search system, PADLOC (PAssive Detection and LOCation), is intended to be used simultaneously with the active search system. Reception in an SQQ-23/PAIR system, in both active and passive mode, is accomplished by hydrophone arrays in the forward and aft sonar domes. There are forty-eight line hydrophones, each made up of eight elements. (Note: The source notes that there are forty-eight hydrophones "evenly spaced around the transducer", but the associated illustration notes that the second sonar dome does not contain a transducer array. It is therefore unknown whether the forty-eight hydrophones is referring to the entire system or just the forward sonar dome.)

== History ==
The AN/SQS-23 was developed by Sangamo Electric Company as a version of the AN/SQS-4, which was, in turn, a 14 kilohertz equivalent of the wartime QHBa unit, which was the first operational scanning active sonar and operated at 28 kilohertz. The AN/SQS-4 program was started in 1951 and became operational in the fleet by 1954. Development for the AN/SQS-23 was underway by 1956 and completed in 1958, with the first fully operational AN/SQS-23 installed onboard USS Norfolk (DL-1) in 1958. Ultimately, the Navy would produce 197 AN/SQS-23 sonar sets.

As designed, the AN/SQS-23 was intended for use with the RUR-5 ASROC, which was in development at the time, providing an detection range of at least 10,000 yd (4.9 nmi) (Note: More in practice) to utilize the standoff range provided by ASROC.

Starting in 1965, the AN/SQS-23 was upgraded in two phases, consisting of the Test Reliability IMprovement program (TRIM) and the Performance Integration and Retrofit (PAIR) program. As upgraded, the resulting system is known as the AN/SQQ-23.

== Variants ==
- AN/SQS-23A - Introduced three operating frequencies, which could be varied by 250 Hz to prevent mutual interference.
- AN/SQS-23B - Introduced SDT operating mode. Single 5 kilohertz operating mode only.
- AN/SQS-23D - reverts to three frequencies (4.55, 5.05, 5.55 kHz, 380 Hz bandwidth). Introduces "FM slide" pulse with 400 Hz bandwidth, the fast (738.8 rpm) scanner, and TRAM.
- AN/SQS-23E - TRAM variant of AN/SQS-23A.
- AN/SQS-23F - TRAM variant of AN/SQS-23B.
- AN/SQS-23G - TRAM variant of AN/SQS-23C.
- AN/SQS-23H - AN/SQS-23D with solid-state transmitter with fault localization;
- AN/SQS-23J/K/L - TRAM variants of AN/SQS-23E/F/G. (Note: not necessarily in that order)
- AN/SQQ-23 - AN/SQS-23 with both TRAM and PAIR installed. Uses rubber-window sonar dome. Includes second sonar dome for passive listening.
  - AN/SQQ-23B - PAIR with single sonar dome.
- OQS-3, OQS-3A - Japanese variant produced under license by NEC or Hitachi
- OQS-103 - Japanese variant produced under license.
- DE-1191 - Raytheon upgrade consisting of a 48 kilowatt solid state transmitter (DE 1190), the DE 1160 receiver and display. Utilizes preexisting AN/SQS-23 sonar dome and transducer array.

== United States Navy ==
- USS Norfolk (DL-1)
- Mitscher-class destroyer - Originally built with AN/SQS-4. USS Mitscher (DL-2) and USS John S. McCain (DL-3) received the AN/SQS-23 during FRAM overhaul beginning April 1960. Other two ships in class received a bow extension and the larger AN/SQS-26.
- Forrest Sherman-class destroyer Originally built with AN/SQS-4. All ships in class received AN/SQS-23 during periodic overhauls.
- Charles F. Adams-class destroyer
- Farragut-class destroyer
- Gearing-class destroyer (FRAM I)
- Leahy-class cruiser
- Bainbridge-class cruiser
- Albany-class cruiser
- Galveston-class cruiser
- Providence-class cruiser
- Dealey-class destroyer escort
- Essex-class aircraft carrier - Hulls designated as Anti-Submarine Carrier (CVS) received SQS-23 as part of the refit.
  - USS Essex (CVS-9)
  - USS Yorktown (CVS-10)
  - USS Intrepid (CVS-11)
  - USS Hornet (CVS-12)
  - USS Randolph (CVS-15)
  - USS Wasp (CVS-18)
  - USS Kearsarge (CVS-33)
- USS America (CVA-66)
- USS Long Beach (CGN-9)

== Royal Australian Navy ==
- Perth-class destroyer

== Brazilian Navy ==
- Marcílio Dias-class destroyer

== Republic of China Navy ==
- Chao Yang-class destroyer (FRAM) - excluding USS Lloyd Thomas (ROCN Dang Yang), which had AN/SQS-29.

== Colombian National Navy ==
- Boyaca - ex-USN Dealey-class destroyer escort

== German Navy ==
- Lütjens-class destroyer

== Hellenic Navy ==
- Gearing-class destroyer - Transferred from the U.S. Navy in FRAM configuration.
- Kimon-class destroyer - ex-USN Charles F. Adams-class destroyers.

== Italian Navy ==
- Vittorio Veneto-class cruiser
- Andrea Doria
- Impavido-class destroyer

== Japan Maritime Self-Defense Force ==
- Takatsuki-class destroyer - JDS Takatsuki and JDS Kikuzuki have AN/SQS-23, JDS Mochizuki and JDS Nagatsuki have OQS-3.
- Yamagumo-class destroyer - DD-113 through DD-115. Remainder have OQS-3.
- Amatsukaze-class destroyer

== Republic of Korea Navy ==
- Daegu-class destroyer - ex-USN FRAM II Allen M. Sumner-class destroyers

== Mexican Navy ==
- Gearing-class destroyers transferred by the U.S. Navy
  - ARM Quetzalcóatl
  - ARM Netzahualcóyotl

== Pakistan Navy ==
- Alamgir-class destroyer - ex-USN FRAM Gearing-class destroyers.

== Spanish Navy ==
- Churruca-class destroyer
- Baleares-class frigate

== Turkish Navy ==
- Yücetepe-class destroyers - ex-USN FRAM I/II destroyers. Only the FRAM I ships have AN/SQS-23.
  - TCG Gayret (D352)
  - TCG Mareşal Fevzi Çakmak (D351)
  - TCG Piyalepaşa (D350)
  - TCG Savaştepe (D348)
  - TCG Tınaztepe (D355)
  - TCG Yücetepe (D345)
