= List of ship launches in 1970 =

The list of ship launches in 1970 includes a chronological list of ships launched in 1970. In cases where no official launching ceremony was held, the date built or completed may be used instead.

Date	Ship	Class and type	Builder	Location	Country	Notes
8 January	Coleraine	Firefighting Tug	Appledore Shipbuilders Ltd.	Appledore	United Kingdom	For R. & J. H. Rea Ltd..
8 January	Mount Whitney	Blue Ridge-class command ship	Newport News Shipbuilding	Newport News, Virginia	United States	For United States Navy.
10 January	Bluefish	Sturgeon-class submarine	Electric Boat	Groton, Connecticut	United States	For United States Navy.
13 January	Chikugo	Chikugo-class destroyer escort			Japan	For Japanese Navy.
17 January	Ouellet	Knox-class frigate	Avondale Shipyard	Avondale, Louisiana	United States	For United States Navy.
22 January	La Pampa	Bulk carrier	Harland & Wolff	Belfast	United Kingdom	For Buries Marks Ltd.
24 January	Fanning	Knox-class frigate	Todd Shipyards	San Pedro, California	United States	For United States Navy.
7 February	Saginaw	Newport-class tank landing ship	National Steel and Shipbuilding Company	San Diego, California	United States	For United States Navy.
February	Kärnan	Ferry	Svendborgs Skibsværft A/S	Svendborg	Denmark	For DSB Färjedivision.
February	Mangro	Daphné-class submarine		Seine-Maritime	France	For Pakistani Navy.
February	Murayjib	Dhafeer-class patrol craft	Keith, Nelson & Co.	Bembridge	United Kingdom	For United Arab Emirates Navy.
6 March	Fair Lady	Ferry	Mutzelfeldwerft	Cuxhaven	West Germany	For Reederei Cassen Eils.
7 March	Joseph Hewes	Knox-class frigate	Avondale Shipyard	Avondale, Louisiana	United States	For United States Navy.
7 March	Courageous	Churchill-class submarine			United Kingdom	For Royal Navy.
11 March	Uzushio	Uzushio-class submarine			Japan	For Japanese Navy.
22 March	Marella	Ferry	Brodogradiliste Titovo	Split	Yugoslavia	For SF Line / Viking Line.
28 March	Bditelnyy	Project 1135 large anti-submarine ship	Yantar	Kaliningrad	Soviet Union	For Soviet Navy.
28 March	San Bernardino	Newport-class tank landing ship	National Steel and Shipbuilding Company	San Diego, California	United States	For United States Navy.
March	Stadt Heiligenhafen	Ferry	Gebrüder Kötter Schiffswerft	Haren	West Germany	For Seebäderdienst Heiligenhafen.
7 April	Al Said	Patrol boat	Brooke Marine Ltd.	Lowestoft	United Kingdom	For Royal Omani Navy.
22 April	Boulder	Newport-class tank landing ship	National Steel and Shipbuilding Company	San Diego, California	United States	For United States Navy.
22 April	Cordene	Tanker	Appledore Shipbuilders Ltd.	Appledore	United Kingdom	For William Cory & Son Ltd.
23 April	Savannah	Wichita-class replenishment oiler	Fore River Shipyard	Quincy, Massachusetts	United States	For United States Navy.
1 May	Billfish	Sturgeon-class submarine	Electric Boat	Groton, Connecticut	United States	For United States Navy.
2 May	Bowen	Knox-class frigate	Avondale Shipyard	Avondale, Louisiana	United States	For United States Navy.
6 May	Bulk Eagle	Bulk carrier	Harland & Wolff	Belfast	United Kingdom	For Kriship Shipping Co.
6 May	Canterbury	Leander-class frigate	Yarrow Shipbuilders	Scotstoun	United Kingdom	For Royal New Zealand Navy.
6 May	Chichester City	Dredger	J. Bolson & Son Ltd.	Poole	United Kingdom	For John Heaver Ltd.
6 May	Viking 1	Ferry	Meyer Werft	Papenburg	West Germany	For Rederi Ab Sally / Viking Line
7 May	Aconit	Unique frigate	DCAN	Lorient	France	For French Navy.
9 May	Sea Venture	Cruise ship			West Germany	For Flagship Cruises.
11 May	Esso Ulidia	Tanker	Harland & Wolff	Belfast	United Kingdom	For Esso Petroleum Co.
20 May	Ponce	Austin-class amphibious transport dock	Lockheed Shipbuilding and Construction Company	Seattle, Washington	United States	For United States Navy.
22 May	Pen Stour	Dredger	Appledore Shipbuilders Ltd.	Appledore	United Kingdom	For Amey Marine Ltd.
23 May	Drum	Sturgeon-class submarine	Mare Island Naval Shipyard	Vallejo, California	United States	For United States Navy.
2 June	Sydney Bridge	Bulk carrier	Harland & Wolff	Belfast	United Kingdom	For Bowring Shipping Ltd.
12 June	Mutsu	Nuclear-powered cargo ship	IHI Corporation	Tokyo	Japan	
12 June	Insel Amrum	Ferry	Husumer Schiffswerft	Husum	West Germany	For Wyker Dampfschiffs-Reederei Amrum GmbH.
20 June	Dixon	L. Y. Spear-class submarine tender	Fore River Shipyard	Quincy, Massachusetts	United States	For United States Navy.
20 June	Paul	Knox-class frigate	Avondale Shipyard	Avondale, Louisiana	United States	For United States Navy.
June	Jinan	Type 051 destroyer	Hudong–Zhonghua Shipbuilding	Shanghai	China	For Chinese Navy.
4 July	Cordale	Tanker	Appledore Shipbuilders Ltd.	Appledore	United Kingdom	For William Cory & Son Ltd.
9 July	Nordic Prince	Song of Norway-class cruise ship	Wärtsilä Helsinki Shipyard	Helsinki	Finland	For Royal Caribbean Cruise Lines.
11 July	Pensacola	Anchorage-class dock landing ship	Fore River Shipyard	Quincy, Massachusetts	United States	For United States Navy.
14 July	Zeya	Cable layer			Finland	For Sudoimport.
21 July	Joanna Van de Merwe	Daphné-class submarine	Dubigeon-Normandie SA	Nantes	France	For South African Navy.
24 July	Brewton	Knox-class frigate	Avondale Shipyard	Avondale, Louisiana	United States	For United States Navy.
1 August	Reasoner	Knox-class frigate	Lockheed Shipbuilding and Construction Company	Seattle, Washington	United States	For United States Navy.
15	Racine	Newport-class tank landing ship	National Steel and Shipbuilding Company	San Diego, California	United States	For United States Navy.
15 August	Travetal		Rickmers Werft	Bremerhaven	West Germany	For J. A. Reinecke.
29 August	Aylwin	Knox-class frigate	Avondale Shipyard	Avondale, Louisiana	United States	For United States Navy.
15 September	Glavkos	Type 209 submarine	Howaldtswerke-Deutsche Werft	Kiel	West Germany	For Greek Navy
16 September	Ayase	Chikugo-class destroyer escort			Japan	For Japanese Navy.
3 October	Esso Tenby	Tanker	Appledore Shipbuilders Ltd.	Appledore	United Kingdom	For Esso Petroleum Co. Ltd..
5 October	Ranger Cadmus	Fishing trawler	Brooke Marine Ltd.	Lowestoft	United Kingdom	For Ranger Fishing Co. Ltd.
8 October	Marshal Voroshilov	Project 1134A Berkut A large anti-submarine ship	Severnaya Verf	Leningrad	Soviet Union	For Soviet Navy.
15 October	Apollo	Leander-class frigate	Yarrow Shipbuilders	Scotstoun	United Kingdom	For Royal Navy.
7 November	Spartanburg County	Newport-class tank landing ship	National Steel and Shipbuilding Company	San Diego, California	United States	For United States Navy.
9 November	Flint	Kilauea-class ammunition ship	Ingalls Shipbuilding	Pascagoula, Mississippi	United States	For United States Navy.
20 November	Prinsessan Desirée	Ferry	Aalborg Shipyard	Aalborg	Denmark	For Sessan Linjen.
21 November	Elmer Montgomery	Knox-class frigate	Avondale Shipyard	Avondale, Louisiana	United States	For United States Navy.
22 November	Admiral Makarov	Project 1134A Berkut A large anti-submarine ship	Severnaya Verf	Leningrad	Soviet Union	For Soviet Navy.
27 November	Athabaskan	Iroquois-class destroyer	Davie Shipbuilding	Lauzon	Canada	For Royal Canadian Navy.
27 November	Columbus New Zealand	Columbus New Zealand-class container ship	Howaldtswerke-Deutsche Werft	Kiel	West Germany	For Hamburg Süd.
28 November	Iroquois	Iroquois-class destroyer	Marine Industries	Sorel-Tracy	Canada	For Royal Canadian Navy.
30 November	Toko Maru	Fisheries research vessel	Hayashikane Shipbuilding	Nagasaki	Japan	For Ministry of Agriculture & Forestry - Fisheries Agency.
11 December	Rudby	Bulk carrier	Harland & Wolff	Belfast	United Kingdom	For Ropner Shipping.
12 December	Fuldatal		Rickmers Werft	Bremerhaven	West Germany	For J. A. Reinecke.
19 December	Fairfax County	Newport-class tank landing ship	National Steel and Shipbuilding Company	San Diego, California	United States	For United States Navy.
19 December	Stein	Knox-class frigate	Lockheed Shipbuilding and Construction Company	Seattle, Washington	United States	For United States Navy.
30 December	Esso Penzance	Tanker	Appledore Shipbuilders Ltd.	Appledore	United Kingdom	For Esso Petroleum Co. Ltd..
30 December	Sig Ragne	Cargo ship	Upper Clyde Shipbuilders	Scotstoun	United Kingdom	For Liverpool Liners.
31 December	Mikhail Lermontov	Ivan Franko-class passenger ship			West Germany	For Baltic Shipping Company.
December	Changzheng 1	Type 091 nuclear-powered attack submarine	Huludao Shipyard	Huludao	China	For Chinese Navy.
Unknown date	A.S.R.1	Air-sea rescue launch	J. Bolson & Son Ltd.	Poole	United Kingdom	For Government of Saudi Arabia.
Unknown date	A.S.R.2	Air-sea rescue launch	J. Bolson & Son Ltd.	Poole	United Kingdom	For Government of Saudi Arabia.
Unknown date	Freight Pioneer	Tug	British Waterways Board	Goole	United Kingdom	For British Waterways Board.
Unknown date	Liman	Moma-class intelligence ship	Stocznia Polnocna	Gdańsk	Poland	For Soviet Navy.
Unknown date	Pontra Maris	Cable-laying barge		Heusden	Netherlands	For Stemat Marine Services.
