= Japanese ship Kuroshio =

Four naval vessels of Japan have been named Kuroshio:

- Japanese destroyer Kuroshio, a Kagerō-class destroyer of the Imperial Japanese Navy during World War II
- JDS Kuroshio (SS-501), a submarine of the Japan Maritime Self-Defense Force in 1955
- JDS Kuroshio (SS-570), an Uzushio-class submarine of the Japan Maritime Self-Defense Force in 1974
- JS Kuroshio (SS-596), an Oyashio-class submarine of the Japan Maritime Self-Defense Force in 2002
