= Japanese submarine Narushio =

At least two warships of Japan have been named Narushio:

- JDS Narushio (SS-569), an Uzushio-class submarine launched in 1972 and struck in 1993.
- JDS Narushio (SS-595), an Oyashio-class submarine launched in 2001
