= Japanese submarine Takashio =

At least two warships of Japan have been named Takashio:

- JDS Takashio (SS-571), an Uzushio-class submarine launched in 1975 and struck in 1995
- JDS Takashio (SS-597), an Oyashio-class submarine launched in 2003
