= Japanese submarine Uzushio =

At least two warships of Japan have been named Uzushio:

- JDS Uzushio (SS-566), an Uzushio-class submarine launched in 1970 and struck in 1987
- JDS Uzushio (SS-592), an Oyashio-class submarine launched in 1998 and decommissioned in 2025
