= Kuroshio (disambiguation) =

Kuroshio refers to the Kuroshio Current, an oceanic current.

It may also refer to:

- Kuroshio, Kōchi, a small town in Kōchi Prefecture, Japan
- Japanese destroyer Kuroshio, a Kagerō-class destroyer of the Imperial Japanese Navy during World War II
- JDS Kuroshio (SS-501), a submarine of the Japanese Maritime Self-Defense Force in 1955
- JDS Kuroshio (SS-570), an Uzushio-class submarine of the Japanese Maritime Self-Defense Force in 1974
- JDS Kuroshio (SS-596), an Oyashio-class submarine of the Japanese Maritime Self-Defense Force in 2002
- Kuroshio (train), a Japanese train service
- Kuroshio Sea, a tank in the Okinawa Churaumi Aquarium
