= JDS Mochizuki =

Destroyer of the Japan Maritime Self-Defense Force

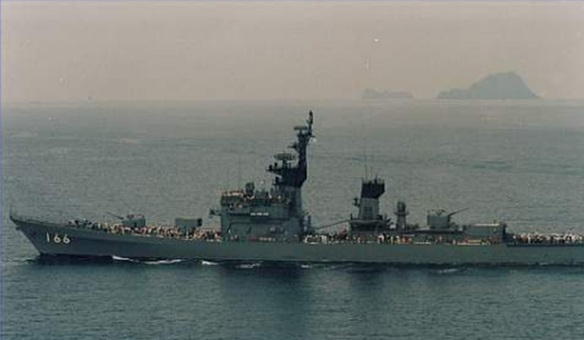
- JDS Mochizuki

History

Japan
- Name: Mochizuki; (もちづき)
- Namesake: Mochizuki (1927)
- Ordered: 1965
- Builder: IHI Corporation
- Laid down: 22 November 1966
- Launched: 15 March 1968
- Commissioned: 25 March 1969
- Decommissioned: 19 March 1999
- Home port: Sasebo (1969-1971); Kure (1971-1983); Maizuru (1983-1995); Sasebo (1995-1999)
- Identification: DD-166; ASU-7019
- Fate: Scrapped

General characteristics
- Class & type: Takatsuki-class destroyer
- Displacement: 3,100 long tons (3,150 t) standard; 4,500 long tons (4,572 t) full load
- Length: 136.0 m (446 ft 2 in) overall
- Beam: 13.4 m (44 ft 0 in)
- Draft: 4.4 m (14 ft 5 in)
- Propulsion: 60,000 shp (45 MW), 2 shafts; 2 × Kawasaki Model NH-300 impulse steam turbines; 2 × Kawasaki Model BD-120-1 water tube boilers
- Speed: 32 knots (37 mph; 59 km/h)
- Range: 6,000 nmi (11,000 km) at 16 kn (18 mph; 30 km/h)
- Complement: 260-270
- Sensors & processing systems: OPS-11B EWR, OPS-17 SSR, AN/SQS-23, AN/SQS-35(J), OPS-11C EWR
- Electronic warfare & decoys: NOLR-1B, NOLQ-1
- Armament: 2 × Mk.42 5 in (127 mm) guns; 1 × (VIII) ASROC; 1 × (IV) Bofors 375 mm (15 in) ASW rocket launcher; 2 × (III) Mk.32 ASW torpedo tubes; 2 × QH-50D DASH anti-submarine drone helicopter

JDS Mochizuki (DD-166) was the third ship of Takatsuki-class destroyers. She was commissioned on 25 March 1969.

== Construction and career ==
Mochizuki was laid down on 22 November 1966 at Ishikawajima Harima Heavy Industries Tokyo No. 2 Factory as the 2306th ship, a 3,000-ton type A II guard ship planned for 1965 based on the Second Defense Build-up Plan, and 1968. Launched on 15 March 1969, commissioned on 25 March 1969, she was incorporated into the Second Defense Build-up Group as a ship under direct control and deployed to Sasebo.

The standard displacement at the time of new construction from this ship is 3,100 tons, the main engine is Kawasaki impulsive type, and the can is Kawasaki BD120-1 type. This ship is the only Kawasaki main engine of the same type.

On 1 February 1971, Mochizuki was transferred to the 1st Escort Corps of the 2nd Escort Corps, and the homeport was transferred to Kure. She participated in practicing ocean voyages in 1972 and 1979.

On 26 November 1974, Mochizuki was dispatched, along with Haruna, Takatsuki and Yukikaze, as disaster relief in response to the 10th Yuyomaru incident that occurred in Tokyo Bay on 9 November 1974. She arrived at the scene and fired for submergence from the 27th to the 28th.

From 12 May to 27 June 1977, Mochizuki participated in Hawaii dispatch training with the escort ship Kikuzuki, the submarine Makishio and eight P-2J aircraft. She would later conduct the same training exercise from 1 November to 17 December 1980 with Tachikaze and Kikuzuki, and eight P-2Js.

On 30 March 1983, she became a ship under the direct control of the 3rd Escort Group, and the fixed port was transferred to Maizuru.

On 30 March 1984, the 2nd Escort Corps was newly formed under the 3rd Escort Corps group and incorporated with sister ship Nagatsuki. The group was later reorganized on 25 January 1989 under the Maizuru District Force.

Since June 1994, she has participated in a practicing voyage to North America with the escort vessels Nagatsuki, Takatsuki and Shirayuki.

On 16 March 1995, Mochizuki was transferred to the Maizuru District Force as a ship under direct control. On 1 April, the same year, she was redesignated as special service ship ASU-7019, and her homeport became Sasebo again. She was eventually decommissioned on 19 March 1999. The total itinerary reached 706,382.6 nautical miles (32.7 laps of the earth).

== Bibliography ==
- Ishibashi, Takao (2002). 海上自衛隊全艦船 1952-2002 [All Ships of the Maritime Self-Defense Force 1952-2002] (in Japanese). Namiki Bookstore.
- 増刊第66集 海上自衛隊全艦艇史 [Special Issue No. 66: History of All Ships of the Japan Maritime Self-Defense Force]. Ships of the World (in Japanese). Kaijinsha. 2004.
- 世界の艦船 第750集 [World Ships Vol. 750] (in Japanese). Kaijinsha. November 2011.
