= JDS Takatsuki =

Destroyer of the Japan Maritime Self-Defense Force

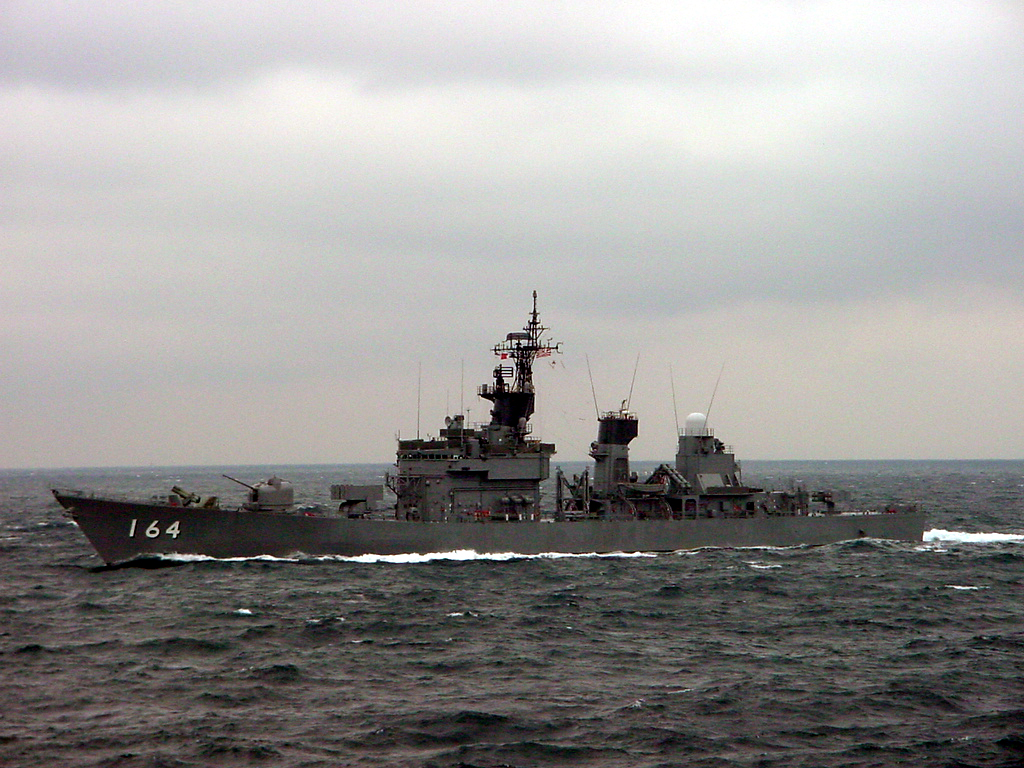
- JDS Takatsuki on 29 October 2000

History

Japan
- Name: Takatsuki; (たかつき)
- Namesake: Takatsuki
- Ordered: 1963
- Builder: IHI Corporation
- Laid down: 8 October 1964
- Launched: 7 January 1966
- Commissioned: 15 March 1967
- Decommissioned: 16 August 2002
- Home port: Kure (1967-1971); Sasebo (1971-1981); Yokosuka (1981-1995); Maizuru (1995-2002)
- Identification: DD-164
- Fate: Scrapped in September 2003

General characteristics
- Class & type: Takatsuki-class destroyer
- Displacement: 3,100 long tons (3,150 t) standard; 4,500 long tons (4,572 t) full load
- Length: 136.0 m (446 ft 2 in) overall
- Beam: 13.4 m (44 ft 0 in)
- Draft: 4.4 m (14 ft 5 in)
- Propulsion: 60,000 shp (45 MW), 2 shafts; 2 × Mitsubishi/WH reaction/impulse steam turbines; 2 × Mitsubishi CE water tube boilers
- Speed: 32 knots (37 mph; 59 km/h)
- Range: 6,000 nmi (11,000 km) at 16 kn (18 mph; 30 km/h)
- Complement: 260-270
- Sensors & processing systems: OPS-11B EWR, OPS-17 SSR, AN/SQS-23, AN/SQS-35(J), OPS-11C EWR
- Electronic warfare & decoys: NOLR-1B, NOLQ-1
- Armament: 2 × Mk.42 5 in (127 mm) guns; 1 × (VIII) ASROC; 1 × (IV) Bofors 375 mm (15 in) ASW rocket launcher; 2 × (III) Mk.32 ASW torpedo tubes; 2 × QH-50D DASH anti-submarine drone helicopter

JDS Takatsuki (DD-164) was the lead ship of Takatsuki-class destroyers. She was commissioned on 15 March 1967.

== Construction and career ==
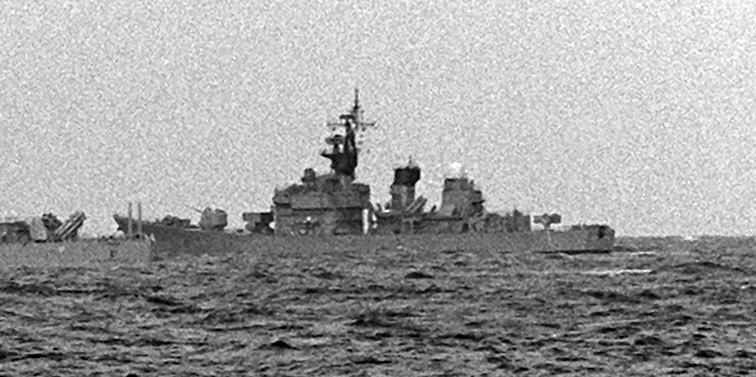
JDS Takatsuki alongside USS Lake Champlain on 14 October 1989.

Takatsuki was laid down on October 8, 1964. Launched on January 7, 1966, commissioned on March 15, 1967, it was incorporated into the 1st Escort Group as a ship under direct control and deployed to Kure.

On March 27, 1968, the 1st Escort Corps was newly commissioned under the 1st Escort Corps group and was incorporated with JDS Kikuzuki commissioned on the same day.

From November 1970 to March 30, 1970, a regular inspection was carried out at Ishikawajima Harima Heavy Industries Tokyo No. 2 Factory, equipped with variable depth sonar (VDS) and a tactical information processing device NYYA-1.

On February 1, 1971, it was incorporated into the 2nd Escort Group as a flagship, and the fixed port was transferred to Sasebo.

It was decided to be dispatched as a disaster in response to the Yuyo Maru No.10 Incident that occurred in Tokyo Bay on November 9, 1974, and on November 26, the incident site together with the escort vessels JDS Haruna, JDS Mochizuki, JDS Narushio and JDS Yukikaze. She was dispatched to Tokyo Bay and fired for submergence from the 27th to the 28th.

In 1977, participated in a practicing voyage to the ocean.

On March 27, 1981, it was incorporated into the 1st Escort Group as a flagship, and the fixed port was transferred to Yokosuka.

Joined the 1st Escort Corps of the 4th Escort Corps on March 30, 1983.

It has undergone a modernization refurbishment (FRAM) since April 1, 1984, which was completed on October 31, 1985.

Since June 1994, she has participated in a practicing voyage to North America with the escort vessels JDS Nagatsuki, JDS Mochizuki, and JS Shirayuki.

On March 16, 1995, she was transferred to the Maizuru District Force 2nd Escort Corps, and the fixed port was transferred to Maizuru.

On March 24, 1997, the 2nd escort was renamed the 24th escort due to the revision of the corps number.

She was decommissioned on August 16, 2002. Despite the FRAM, the ship was 35 years and 5 months old, with a total voyage of 814,113 nautical miles (37.6 laps of the earth) and a total voyage of 65,480 hours.
