= Andrea Doria (disambiguation) =

Andrea Doria (1466–1560) was an Italian (Genoese) admiral.

Andrea Doria may also refer to:

== Ships ==
- Andrew Doria (1775 brig) or Andrea Doria, an American warship
- Italian ironclad Andrea Doria, a pre-dreadnought battleship completed in 1891
- Italian battleship Andrea Doria, a dreadnought battleship completed in 1916
- SS Andrea Doria, an ocean liner launched in 1951 and sunk in a collision in 1956
- Italian cruiser Andrea Doria, a missile-launcher cruiser commissioned in 1964
- Italian destroyer Andrea Doria, an Orizzonte-class destroyer commissioned in 2007

== Other uses ==
- "The Andrea Doria" (Seinfeld), a 1996 episode of Seinfeld
- Society Andrea Doria, a Genoese football club that merged into U.C. Sampdoria
- 2175 Andrea Doria, a Florian asteroid
- Andrea Doria (song), a 1986 song by Brazilian rock band Legião Urbana

== See also ==
- Giovanni Andrea Doria (1539–1606), Genoese admiral related to Andrea Doria
- Italian ship Andrea Doria, a list of warships
- Portrait of Andrea Doria (Sebastiano del Piombo), a 1526 painting
- Portrait of Andrea Doria as Neptune, a c. 1540 painting by Bronzino
