= JDS Nagatsuki =

Destroyer of the Japan Maritime Self-Defense Force

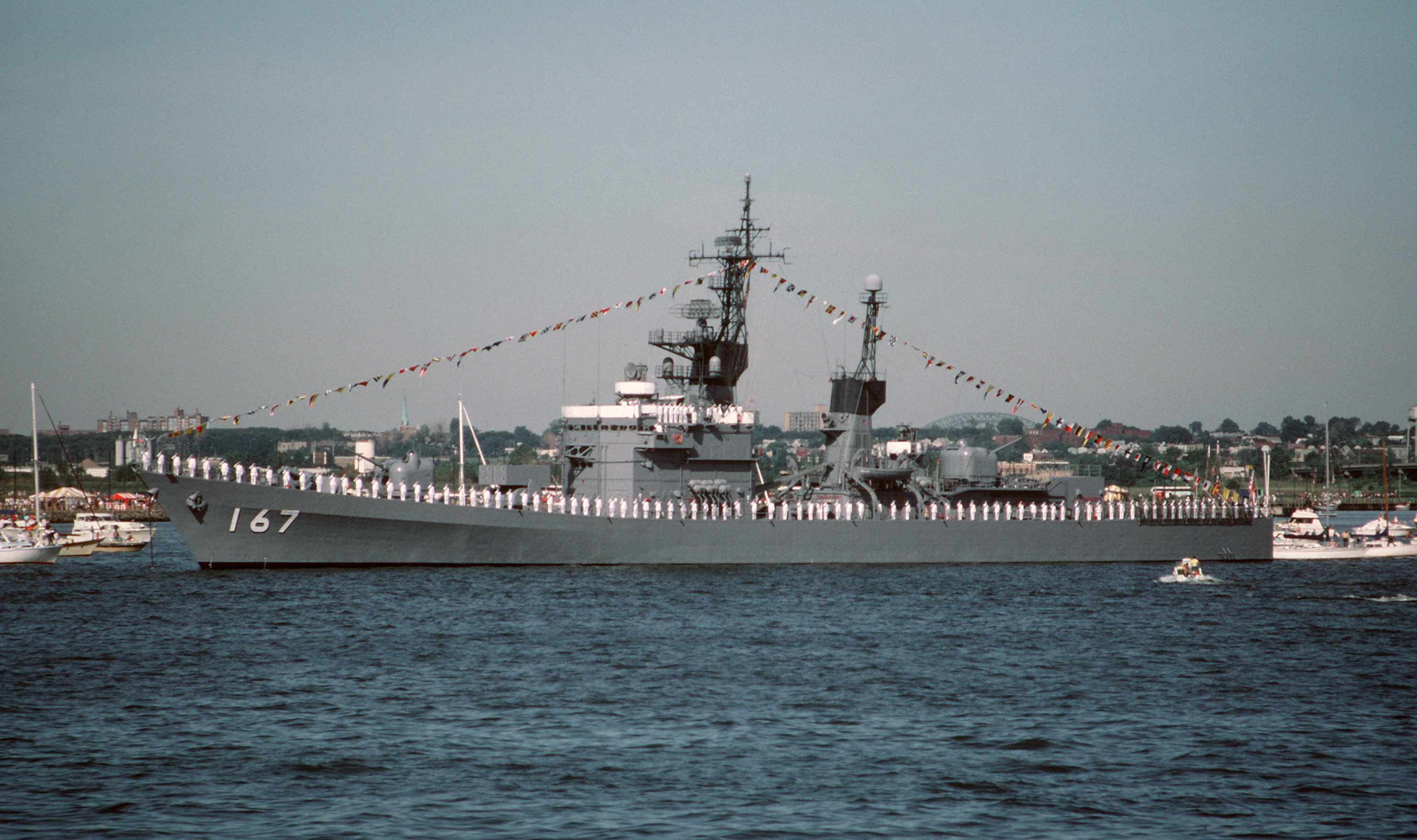
- JDS Nagatsuki on 4 July 1986

History

Japan
- Name: Nagatsuki; (ながつき)
- Ordered: 1965
- Builder: Mitsubishi Heavy Industries
- Laid down: 2 March 1968
- Launched: 19 March 1969
- Commissioned: 12 February 1970
- Decommissioned: 19 March 1996
- Home port: Maizuru
- Identification: DD-167
- Fate: Sunk as target, 3 August 1997

General characteristics
- Class & type: Takatsuki-class destroyer
- Displacement: 3,100 long tons (3,100 t) standard; 4,500 long tons (4,600 t) full load
- Length: 136.0 m (446 ft 2 in) overall
- Beam: 13.4 m (44 ft 0 in)
- Draft: 4.4 m (14 ft 5 in)
- Propulsion: 60,000 shp (45,000 kW), 2 shafts; 2 × Mitsubishi/WH reaction/impulse steam turbines; 2 × Mitsubishi CE water tube boilers
- Speed: 32 knots (59 km/h; 37 mph)
- Range: 6,000 nmi (11,000 km; 6,900 mi) at 16 kn (30 km/h; 18 mph)
- Complement: 260–270
- Sensors & processing systems: OPS-11B EWR, OPS-17 SSR, AN/SQS-23, AN/SQS-35(J); OPS-11C EWR
- Electronic warfare & decoys: NOLR-1B; NOLQ-1
- Armament: 2 × 5-inch/54-caliber Mark 42 guns; 1 × eight ASROC; 1 × quad Bofors 375 mm (14.8 in) ASW rocket launcher; 2 × (III) Mk 32 ASW torpedo tubes; 2 × QH-50D DASH anti-submarine drone helicopter

JDS Nagatsuki (DD-167) was the fourth ship of the Takatsuki class of destroyers. She was commissioned on 12 February 1970.

== Construction and career ==
Nagatsuki was laid down on 2 March 1968, at Mitsubishi Heavy Industries Nagasaki Shipyard & Machinery Works as No. 2307, a 3,000-ton type A II guard ship planned for 1966 based on the Second Defense Build-up Plan, and to be laid down in 1969. Launched on 19 March 1970, commissioned on 12 February 1970, she was incorporated into the 3rd Escort Group as a ship under direct control and deployed to Maizuru, which remained her homeport throughout her career.

In 1976, Nagatsuki participated in a practicing voyage to the ocean with the training vessel JDS Katori, and at that time, participated in the observing ceremony of the 200th anniversary of the founding of the United States in New York. On 30 March 1984, the 2nd Escort Corps was newly formed under the 3rd Escort Corps group and incorporated with sister ship Mochizuki. In 1986, Nagatsuki participated in a practicing voyage to the ocean, at which time she participated in the International Fleet Review Ceremony for the 100th Anniversary of the Statue of Liberty in New York. On 25 January 1989, the 2nd Escort Corps was reorganized under the Maizuru District Force.

Nagatsuki participated in a training voyage to North America from June to November 1994 as the flagship of the training fleet, which consisted of escort vessels Takatsuki, Mochizuki, and Shirayuki. For this reason, a wood grain sheet was attached to the equipment of the salute (removed after the end) and the equipment panel of the officer's room.

Nagatsuki was decommissioned on 1 April 1996, and a year later, on 3 August 1997, she was sunk as a target ship north of Wakasa Bay by bombardment by Hiei, Takatsuki, and Natsushio.

Nagatsuki's bell was the one that was installed on the former Imperial Japanese Navy's Mutsuki-class destroyer Nagatsuki that was stranded in the Bennett cove, Kolombangara Island. That Nagatsuki was dismantled after the war, but her bells were kept by the locals at that time, and then the ones brought back to Japan were handed over to the Maritime Self-Defense Force by the efforts of the then general manager of the Kure district, Tatsuo Chikudo, in November 1970. The bells were fitted to the ship on 17 March.

After the ship's retirement, both the Nagatsuki's bell are both preserved at the Maizuru Navy Memorial Hall.

== Gallery ==
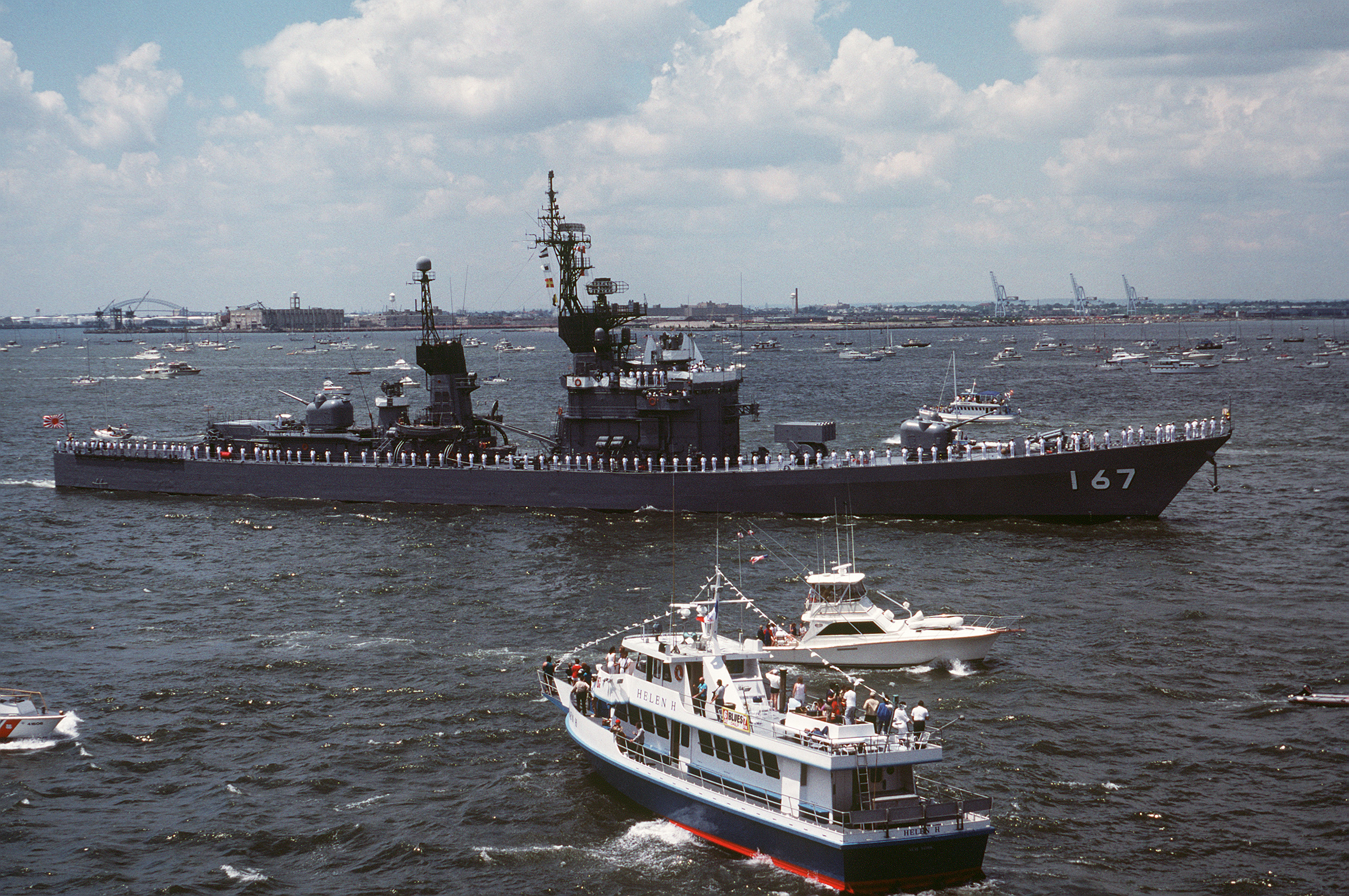
JDS Nagatsuki at New York Harbor on 4 July 1986.

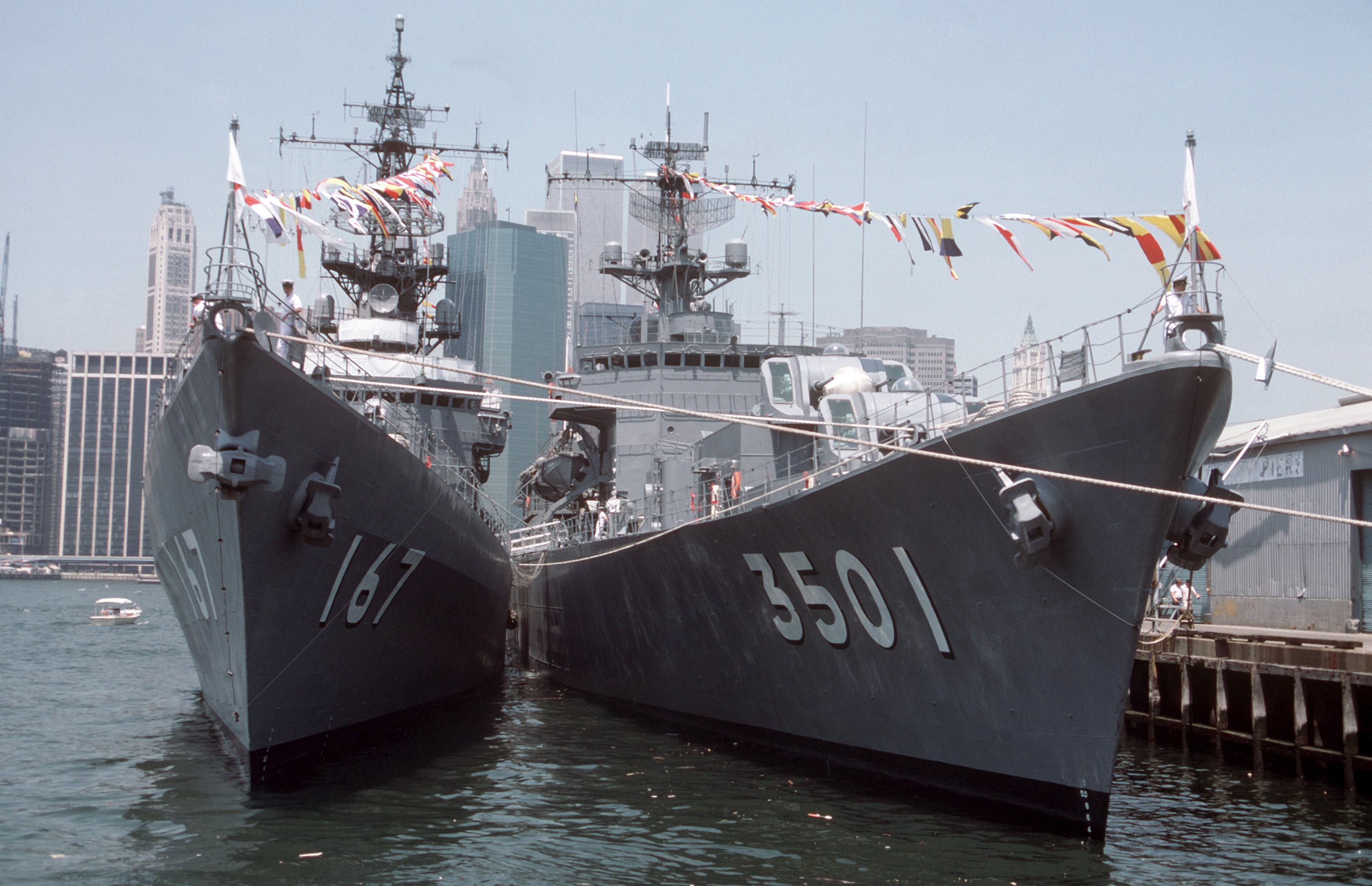
JDS Nagatsuki and JDS Katori at New York Harbor on 4 July 1986.

== Bibliography ==
- Ishibashi, Takao (2002). 海上自衛隊全艦船 1952-2002 [All Ships of the Maritime Self-Defense Force 1952-2002] (in Japanese). Namiki Bookstore.
- 増刊第66集 海上自衛隊全艦艇史 [Special Issue No. 66: History of All Ships of the Japan Maritime Self-Defense Force]. Ships of the World (in Japanese). Kaijinsha. 2004.
- 世界の艦船 第750集 [World Ships Vol. 750] (in Japanese). Kaijinsha. November 2011.
