= JS Natsushio =

Harushio-class submarine

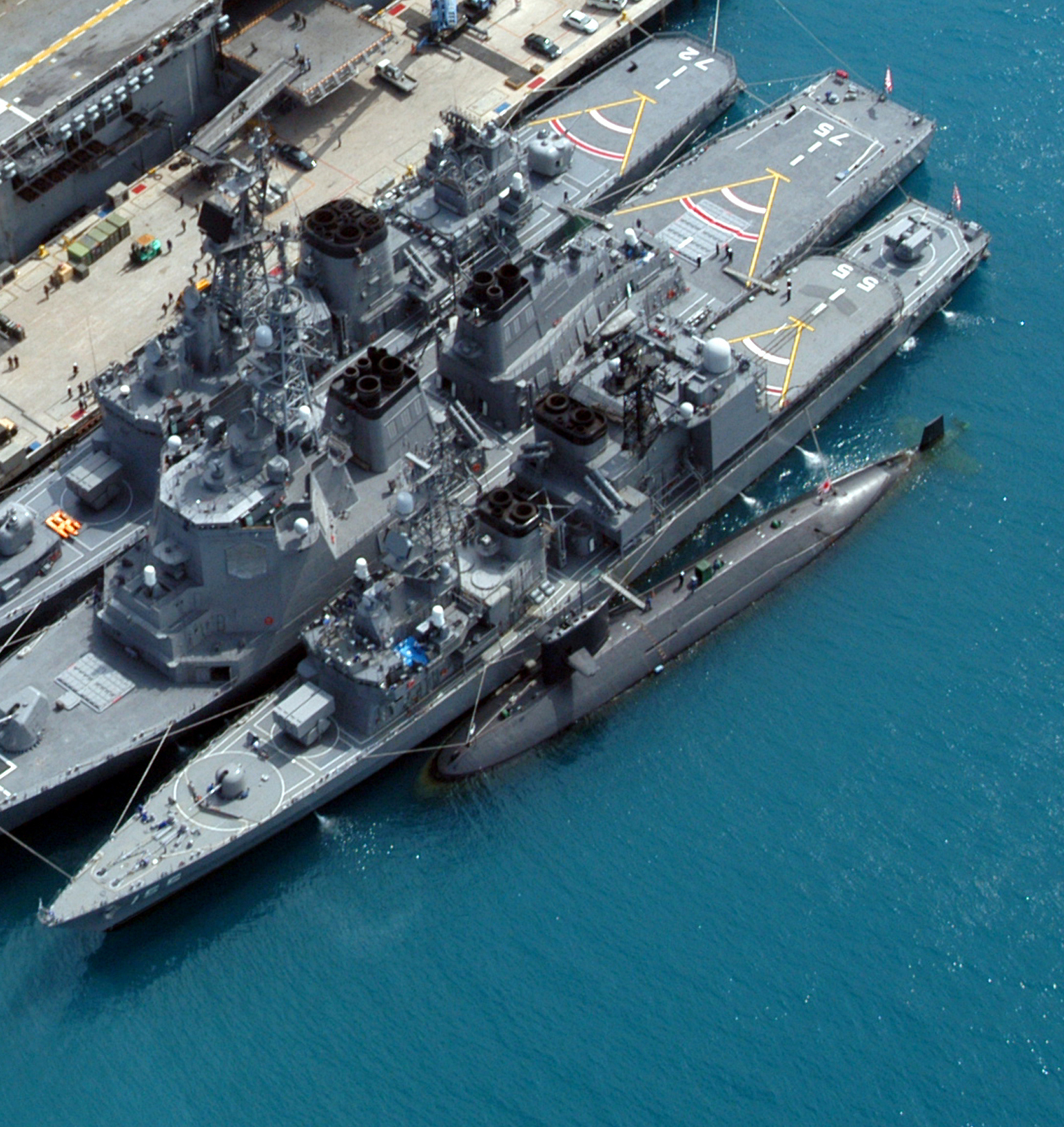
- JDS Natsushio

History

Japan
- Name: Natsushio; (なつしお)
- Ordered: 1987
- Builder: Kawasaki, Kobe
- Laid down: 8 April 1988
- Launched: 20 March 1990
- Commissioned: 20 March 1991
- Decommissioned: 26 March 2010
- Home port: Kure
- Identification: Pennant number: SS-584
- Fate: Scrapped, 2011

General characteristics
- Class & type: Harushio-class submarine
- Displacement: Surface: 2,450 tonnes; Submerged: 3,200 tonnes
- Length: 77.0 m (252 ft 7 in)
- Beam: 10 m (32 ft 10 in)
- Draft: 7.7 m (25 ft 3 in)
- Propulsion: 2 × Kawasaki 12V25/25S diesel electric engines; 2 × shafts
- Speed: Surfaced: 12 kn (22 km/h; 14 mph); Submerged: 20 kn (37 km/h; 23 mph)
- Complement: 75
- Sensors & processing systems: Hughes/Oki ZQQ 5B Sonar; ZQR 1 towed array; JRC ZPS 6 I-band search radar
- Armament: 6 × HU-606 533 mm (21 in) torpedo tubes for: Type 89 torpedo

JS Natsushio (SS-584) was the second ship of the Harushio-class submarines of Japan Maritime Self-Defense Force.

== Development and design ==
This type is a teardrop type ship type, a so-called SSS (Single Screw Submarine) type with a single-axis propulsion system, and the structural style is a complete double-shell structure, following the method since the Uzushio-class (42SS) in the basic design concept . Meanwhile, the type, dual vibration-damping support of the anti-vibration support or main engine of the main motor, the auxiliary equipment and pipe systems, static power supply, and rectification of the hole opening on the bottom of the ship. Through these efforts, it was decided that the masker sound insulation device was unnecessary, and in the latter model of this model, it was so quiet that it would not be detected even if snorkeling was continued until the sonobuoy was visible.

== Construction and career ==
Natsushio was laid down at Kawasaki Heavy Industries Kobe Shipyard on 8 April 1988 as the 1987 plan 2400-ton submarine No. 8099 and it was launched on 20 March 1990. She was commissioned on 20 March 1991 and homeported in Kure. She belonged to the 5th Submarine of the 1st Submarine Group.

She participated in the RIMPAC 1996.

On 3 August 1997, Natsushio sank the target ship Nagatsuki north of Wakasa Bay.

On 8 May 2000, she and Kongō left Kure to participate in RIMPAC 2000 which took place from 30 May until 6 July.

She took part in RIMPAC 2002.

Natsushio was decommissioned on 26 March 2010. She had participated in ten Maritime Self-Defense Force exercises and eight simulated combat trainings between submarines. She was scrapped in Etajima in 2011.

== Gallery ==
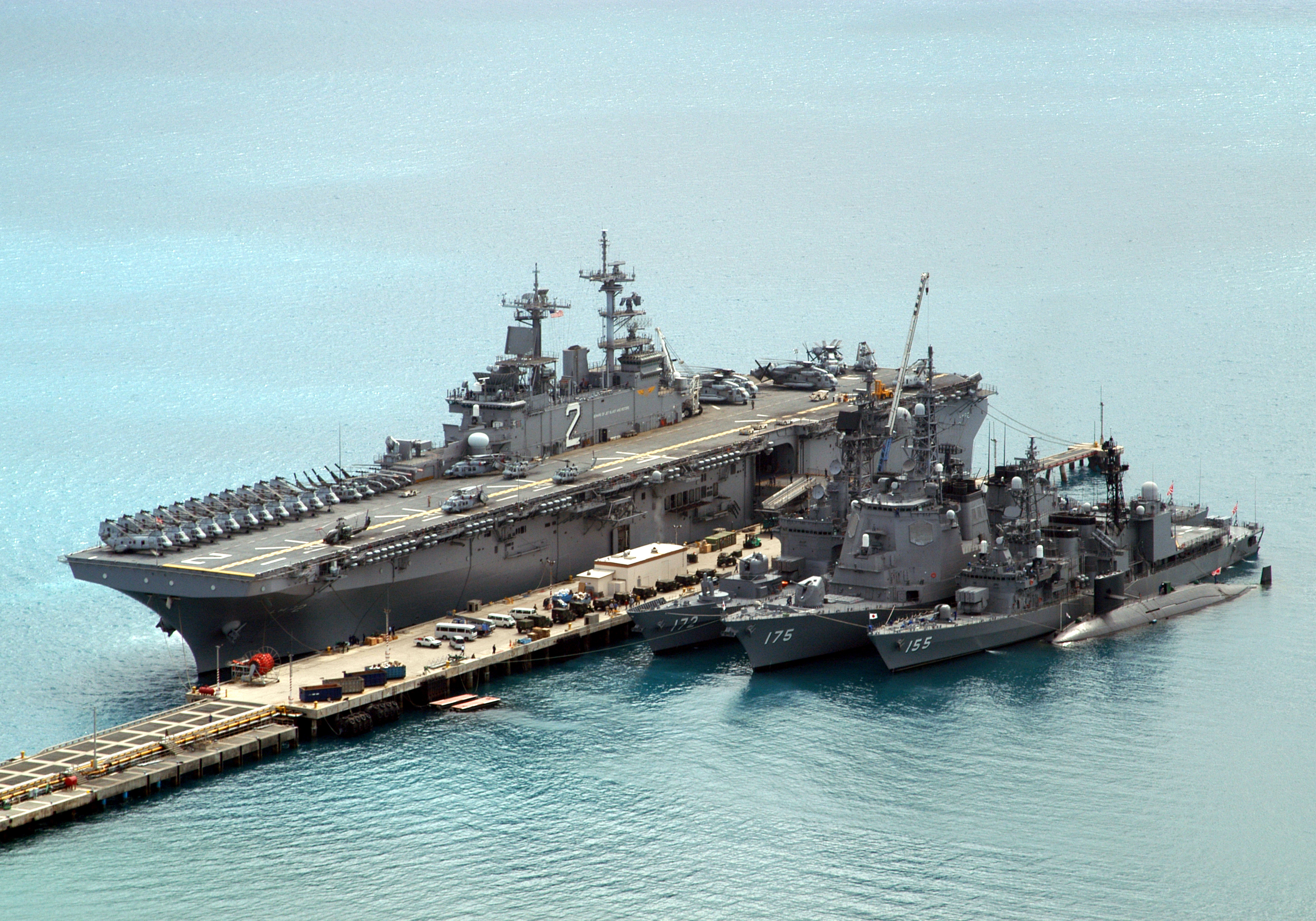
USS Essex, JS Shimakaze, JS Myōkō, JS Hamagiri and JS Natsushio at White Beach Port, Okinawa on 28 February 2003

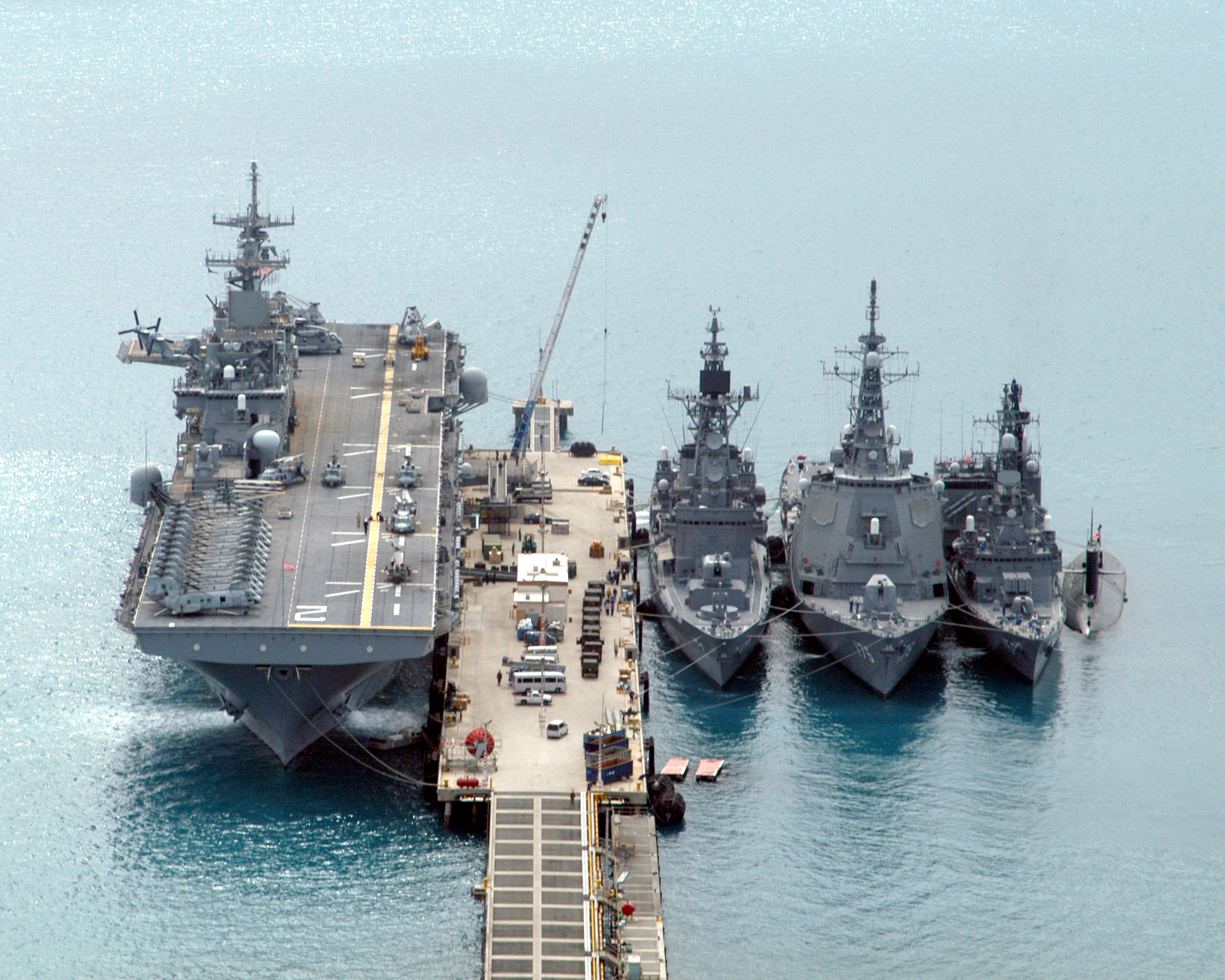

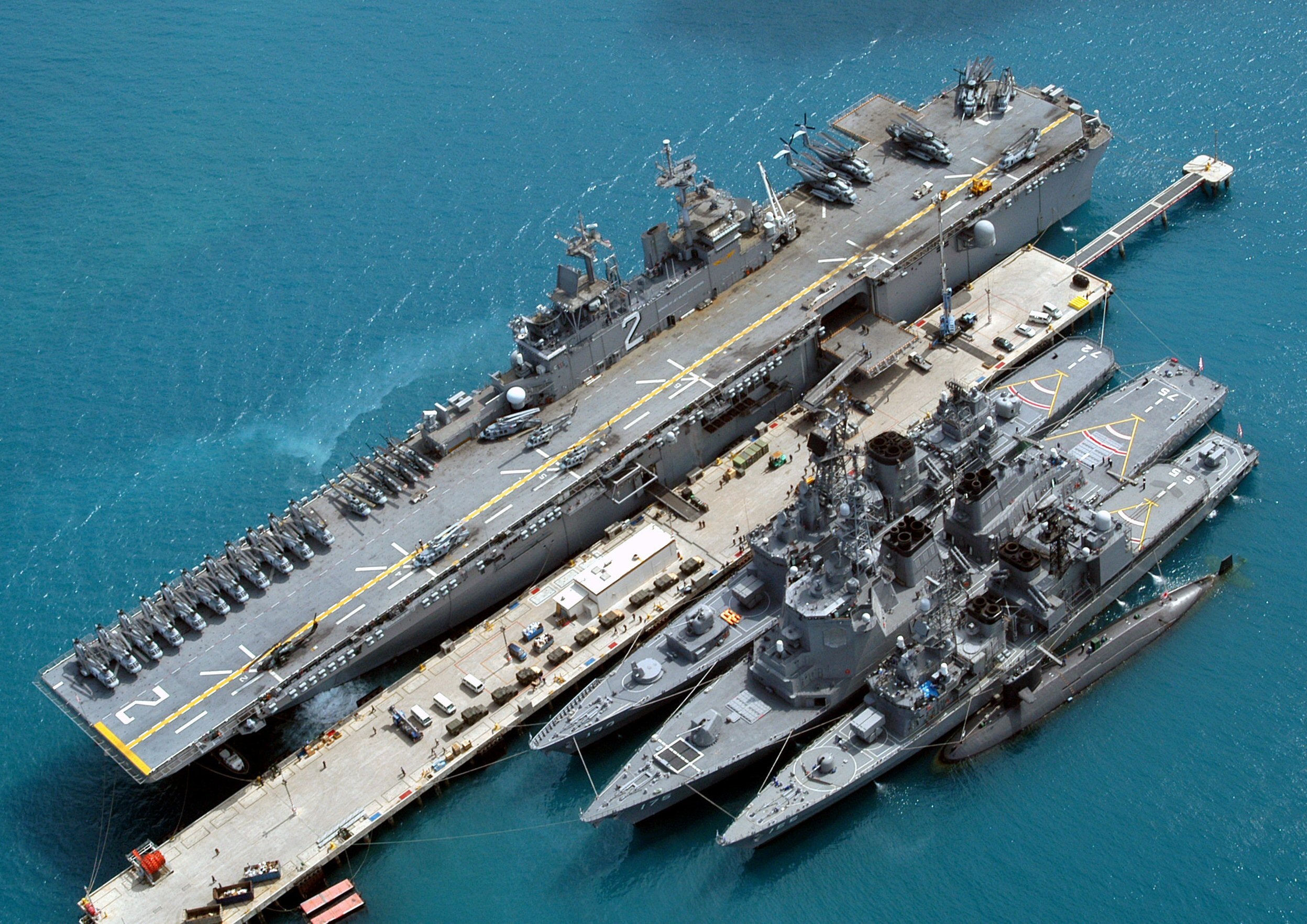

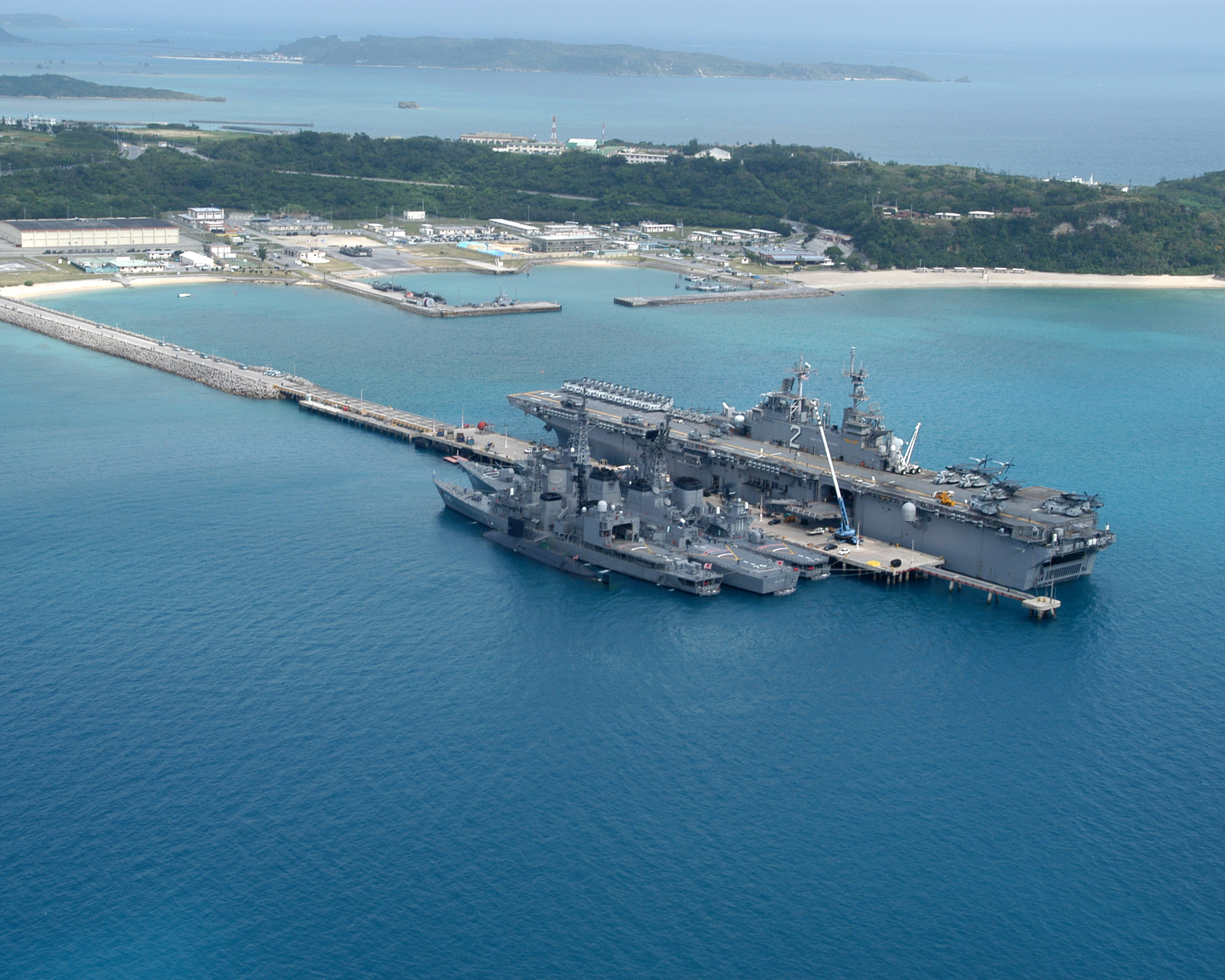
