= Takatsuki-class destroyer =

Class of Japanese warships

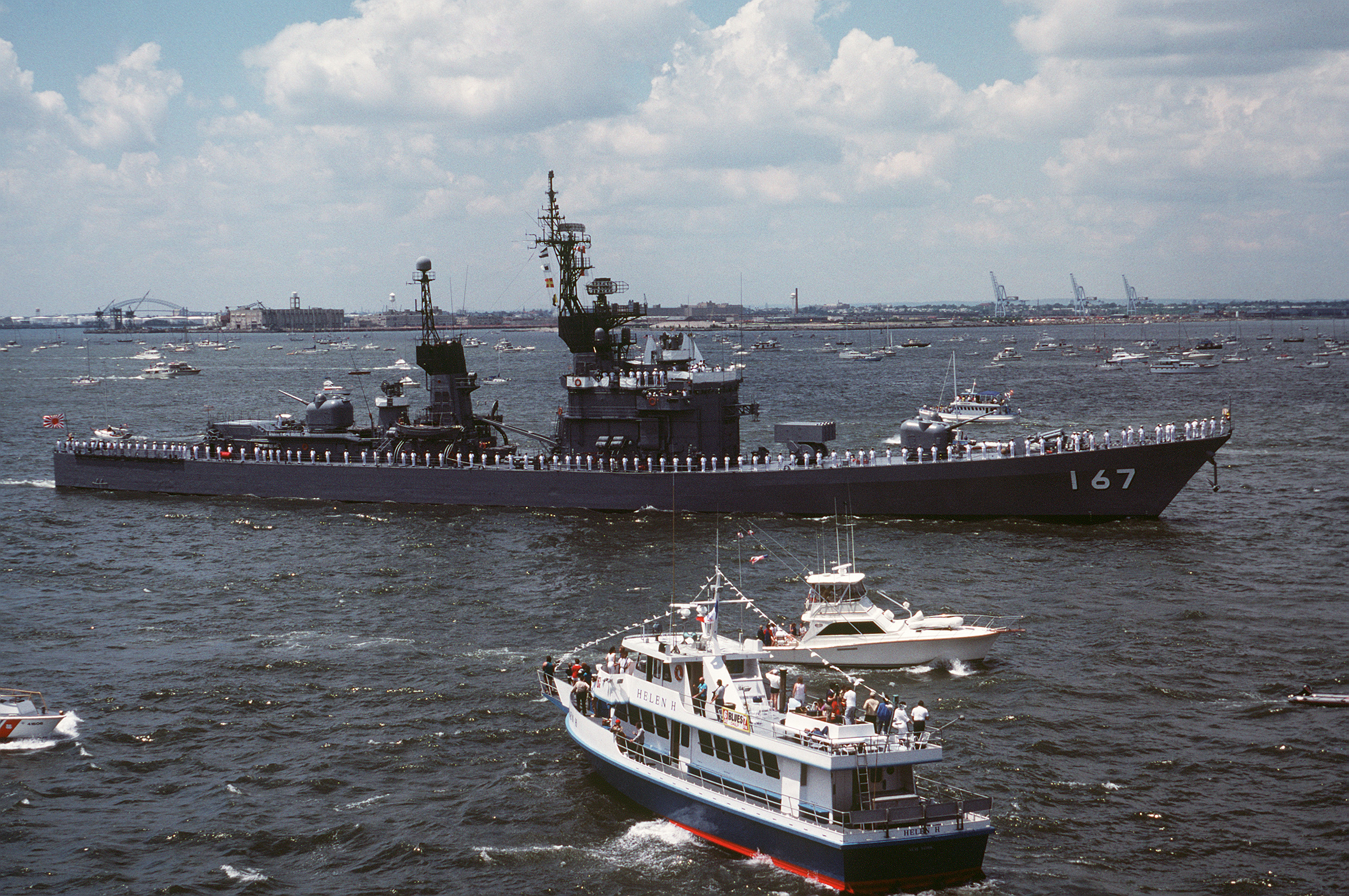
- JS Nagatsuki in 1986

Class overview
- Name: Takatsuki class
- Builders: Ishikawajima-Harima HI (2); Mitsubishi Heavy Industries (2)
- Operators: Japan Maritime Self-Defense Force
- Preceded by: Yamagumo class
- Succeeded by: Minegumo class
- Built: 1964–1970
- In commission: 1967–2003
- Planned: 4
- Completed: 4
- Retired: 4

General characteristics
- Type: Destroyer
- Displacement: 3,100 long tons (3,150 t) standard; 4,500 long tons (4,572 t) full load
- Length: 136.0 m (446 ft 2 in) overall
- Beam: 13.4 m (44 ft 0 in)
- Draft: 4.4 m (14 ft 5 in)
- Propulsion: 60,000 shp (45 MW), 2 shafts; (Takatsuki and Nagatsuki); 2 × Mitsubishi/WH reaction/impulse steam turbines; 2 × Mitsubishi CE water tube boilers; (Kikuzuki); 2 × Mitsubishi/EW impulse steam turbines; 2 × Mitsubishi CE water tube boilers; (Mochizuki); 2 × Kawasaki Model NH-300 impulse steam turbines; 2 × Kawasaki Model BD-120-1 water tube boilers
- Speed: 32 knots (59 km/h; 37 mph)
- Range: 6,000 nmi (11,000 km; 6,900 mi) at 16 kn (30 km/h; 18 mph)
- Complement: 270 (Takatsuki, 1967), 260 (Takatsuki, 1985)
- Sensors & processing systems: OPS-11B EWR, OPS-17 SSR, AN/SQS-23, AN/SQS-35(J), OPS-11C EWR (1986); Mark 56 fire-control system
- Electronic warfare & decoys: NOLR-1B, NOLQ-1 (1986)
- Armament: (Takatsuki, 1967); 2 × Mk.42 5 in (127 mm) guns; 1 × 8 ASROC; 1 × 4 Bofors 375 mm (15 in) ASW rocket launcher; 2 × 3 Mk.32 ASW torpedo tubes; 2 × QH-50D DASH anti-submarine drone helicopter; (Kikuzuki, 1986); 1 × Mk.42 5 in (127 mm) gun; 2 × 4 RGM-84 Harpoon; 1 × 8 Mk.29 Sea Sparrow; 1 × Mk.15 CIWS; 1 × 8 ASROC; 1 × 4 Bofors 375 mm (15 in) ASW rocket launcher; 2 × 3 Mk.32 ASW torpedo tubes

The Takatsuki-class destroyer was a series of four destroyers constructed for and operated by the Japan Maritime Self-Defense Force. Built between 1964 and 1970, the destroyers were mainly used for anti-submarine warfare (ASW) duties and were designed to operate the DASH unmanned ASW drone system. The system did not work and was removed from all four ships in 1977. In the mid-1980s, the first two ships of the class were modernized, receiving surface-to-air and anti-ship missiles. The final two ships were scheduled to be modernized, but the program was cancelled.

== Modernization ==
From 1985 to 1988, Takatsuki and Kikuzuki were upgraded with Sea Sparrow surface-to-air missile launchers, Harpoon missile anti-ship missile launchers, Phalanx CIWS systems (Kikuzuki only), new FCS (FCS-2-12) fire control radar and TASS. Mochizuki and Nagatsuki were in the upgrade program, but were eventually not upgraded.

== Ships ==
Takatsuki class construction data
Pennant no.	Name	Builder	Laid down	Launched	Completed	Fate
DD-164	Takatsuki	Ishikawajima-Harima Heavy Industries, Tokyo	8 October 1964	7 January 1966	15 March 1967	Decommissioned 16 August 2002
DD-165	Kikuzuki	Mitsubishi Heavy Industries, Nagasaki Shipyard	15 March 1966	25 March 1967	27 March 1968	Decommissioned 6 November 2003
DD-166	Mochizuki	Ishikawajima-Harima Heavy Industries, Tokyo	25 November 1966	15 March 1968	25 March 1969	Converted to an auxiliary ship (Pennant no. ASU-7019) on 16 March 1995, decommissioned on 19 March 1999
DD-167	Nagatsuki	Mitsubishi Heavy Industries, Nagasaki Shipyard	2 March 1968	19 March 1969	12 February 1970	Decommissioned 1 April 1996 and sunk as target on 3 August 1998

== See also ==
- List of destroyer classes

Equivalent destroyers of the same era

- Chungbuk class
- County class
- Perth class
