= JDS Isoshio (SS-568) =

Uzushio-class submarines

History

Japan
- Name: Isoshio; (いそしお)
- Ordered: 1969
- Builder: Kawasaki, Kobe
- Laid down: 9 July 1970
- Launched: 18 March 1972
- Commissioned: 25 November 1972
- Decommissioned: 25 March 1992
- Reclassified: ATSS-8001
- Home port: Kure
- Identification: Pennant number: SS-568
- Fate: Sunk as target, August 1994

General characteristics
- Class & type: Uzushio-class submarine
- Displacement: 1,850 tonne (1,821 ton) standard, 3,600 tonne (3,543 ton) submerged
- Length: 72.0 m (236.2 ft)
- Beam: 9.9 m (32 ft)
- Draught: 7.5 m (25 ft)
- Depth: 10.1 m (33 ft)
- Propulsion: 1-shaft diesel-electric; 2 × Kawasaki-MAN V8V24/30AMTL diesel; 3,400 bhp (2,500 kW) (surfaced); 7,200 shp (5,400 kW) (submerged)
- Speed: 12 knots (22 km/h) surfaced; 20 knots (37 km/h) submerged
- Range: 5,500 nautical miles (10,200 km; 6,300 mi) at 12 knots
- Complement: 80
- Sensors & processing systems: ZPS-4 surface search radar; ZQQ-2 passive sonar; SQS-4 active sonar
- Electronic warfare & decoys: ZLA-5 ESM
- Armament: 6 × 533 mm (21 in) Bow torpedo tubes; 12 × type 72 torpedo; 6–8 × Mk 37 torpedo

JDS Isoshio (SS-568) was the third boat of the Uzushio-class submarines. She was commissioned on 25 November 1972.

== Construction and career ==
Isoshio was laid down at Kawasaki Heavy Industries Kobe Shipyard on 9 July 1970 and launched on 18 March 1972. She was commissioned on 25 November 1972, into the 1st Submarine Group.

On 28 September 1973, she was transferred to the 5th Submarine, which was newly commissioned under the 1st Submarine Group, along with Narushio, who was commissioned on the same day.

Participated in Hawaii dispatch training from 9 October to 22 December 1975 .

On 24 March 1989, she was reclassified as first training and experimental submarine ATSS-8001, and became a ship under the direct control of the 1st submarine group. After the type change, she was slightly modified and used for education and training and experiments on various equipment.

She was decommissioned on 25 March 1992.

In early August 1994, she was used as a target for the new anti-submarine torpedo G-RX4 under development by the Technical Research and Development Institute off the coast of Izu Ōshima. In addition, in order to carry out the test in a submerged state, which is the first attempt by the Maritime Self-Defense Force, a remodeling work was carried out to install a float structure on the hull.
