= JDS Kikuzuki =

Takatsuki-class destroyer commissioned in 1968

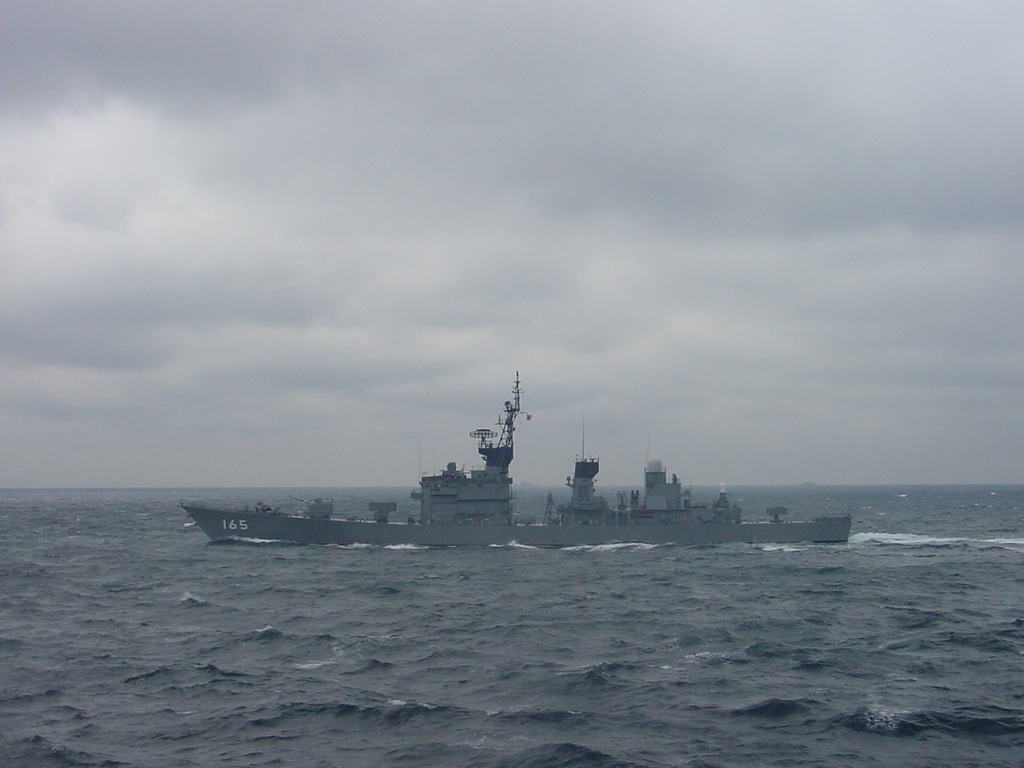
- JDS Kikuzuki on 29 October 2000

History

Japan
- Name: Kikuzuki; (きくづき)
- Namesake: Kikuzuki (1926)
- Ordered: 1964
- Builder: Mitsubishi Heavy Industries
- Laid down: 15 March 1966
- Launched: 25 March 1967
- Commissioned: 27 March 1968
- Decommissioned: 6 November 2003
- Home port: Kure (1968-1983); Yokosuka (1983-1993); Maizuru (1993-2003)
- Identification: DD-165
- Fate: Scrapped in April 2005

General characteristics
- Class & type: Takatsuki-class destroyer
- Displacement: 3,100 long tons (3,150 t) standard; 4,500 long tons (4,572 t) full load
- Length: 136.0 m (446 ft 2 in) overall
- Beam: 13.4 m (44 ft 0 in)
- Draft: 4.4 m (14 ft 5 in)
- Propulsion: 60,000 shp (45 MW), 2 shafts; 2 × Mitsubishi/EW impulse steam turbines; 2 × Mitsubishi CE water tube boilers
- Speed: 32 knots (37 mph; 59 km/h)
- Range: 6,000 nmi (11,000 km) at 16 kn (18 mph; 30 km/h)
- Complement: 260-270
- Sensors & processing systems: OPS-11B EWR, OPS-17 SSR, AN/SQS-23, AN/SQS-35(J), OPS-11C EWR
- Electronic warfare & decoys: NOLR-1B, NOLQ-1
- Armament: 1 × Mk.42 5 in (127 mm) gun; 2 × (IV) RGM-84 Harpoon; 1 × (VIII) Mk.29 Sea Sparrow; 1 × Mk.15 CIWS; 1 × (VIII) ASROC; 1 × (IV) Bofors 375 mm (15 in) ASW rocket launcher; 2 × (III) Mk.32 ASW torpedo tubes

JDS Kikuzuki (DD-165) was the second ship of Takatsuki-class destroyers. She was commissioned on 27 March 1968.

== Construction and career ==
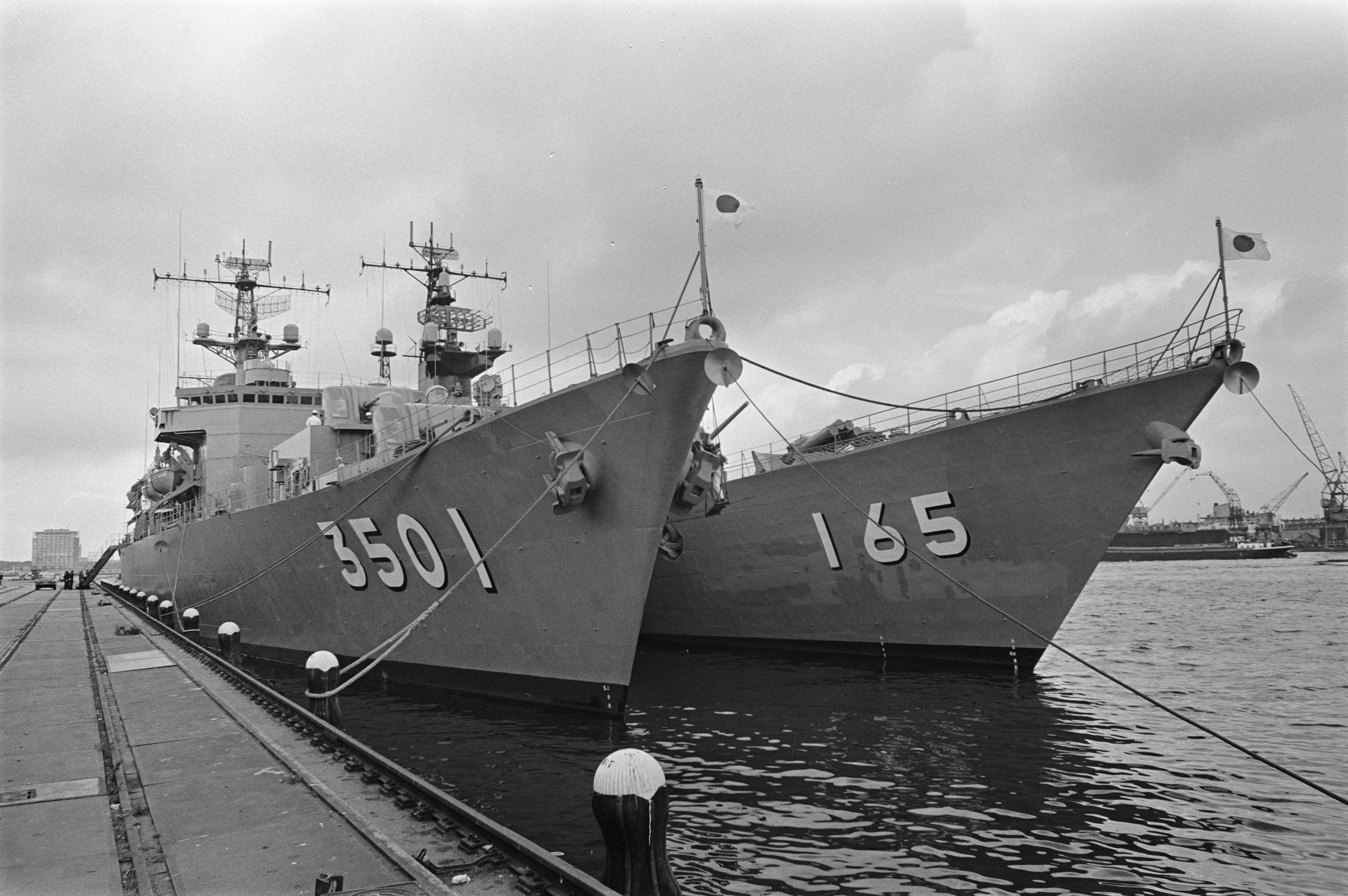
JDS Katori and JDS Kikuzuki at Amsterdam on 3 September 1970.

Kikuzuki was laid down on 15 March 1966 at Mitsubishi Heavy Industries Nagasaki Shipyard & Machinery Works as No. 2305, a 3,000-ton type A II security ship planned in 1964 based on the Second Defense Build-up Plan. Launched on 25 March, commissioned on 27 March 1968, and was incorporated into the 1st Escort Corps, which was newly formed under the 1st Escort Corps group on the same day, along with JDS Takatsuki and deployed to Kure.

From 30 June 1970, he participated in the first practicing voyage around the world as a Maritime Self-Defense Force with the training ship JDS Katori. After the damage accident of the main turbine occurred on 30 October, just before the arrival at Colombo Harbor in Ceylon, he sailed on one axis only on the port side and returned to Japan on 18 November.

On 1 February 1971, the 1st Escort Corps was reorganized under the 2nd Escort Corps group.

In 1973, participated in a practicing voyage to the ocean.

From 12 May to 27 June 1977, participated in Hawaii dispatch training with the escort ship JDS Mochizuki, the submarine JDS Makishio, and eight P-2J aircraft.

From 1 November to 17 December 1980, participated in Hawaii dispatch training with the escort vessels JDS Tachikaze, JDS Mochizuki, and eight P-2Js.

On 30 March 1983, the 1st Escort Corps was transferred to the 4th Escort Corps, and the homeport was transferred to Yokosuka. Also, from 15 June of the same year, she participated in a practicing voyage around the world.

It has undergone a modernization refurbishment (FRAM) since 30 May 1985, which was completed on 26 December 1986.

On 25 March 1993, he was transferred to the Maizuru District Force 2nd Escort Corps, and the homeport was transferred to Maizuru.

On 24 March 1997, the 2nd escort was renamed the 24th escort due to the revision of the corps number.

Decommissioned on 6 November 2003. The total number of voyages has reached 67,678 hours, and the total voyage has reached 791,213.4 nautical miles (36.5 laps around the Earth), during which time he has participated in three practicing voyages (two of which are around the world).
