= JDS Takashio (SS-571) =

Uzushio-class submarines

History

Japan
- Name: Takashio; (たかしお)
- Ordered: 1972
- Builder: Mitsubishi, Kobe
- Laid down: 6 July 1973
- Launched: 30 June 1975
- Commissioned: 30 January 1976
- Decommissioned: 26 July 1995
- Reclassified: ATSS-8004
- Home port: Kure
- Identification: Pennant number: SS-571
- Fate: Scrapped

General characteristics
- Class & type: Uzushio-class submarine
- Displacement: 1,850 tonne (1,821 ton) standard, 3,600 tonne (3,543 ton) submerged
- Length: 72.0 m (236.2 ft)
- Beam: 9.9 m (32 ft)
- Draught: 7.5 m (25 ft)
- Depth: 10.1 m (33 ft)
- Propulsion: 1-shaft diesel-electric; 2 × Kawasaki-MAN V8V24/30AMTL diesel; 3,400 bhp (2,500 kW) (surfaced); 7,200 shp (5,400 kW) (submerged)
- Speed: 12 knots (22 km/h) surfaced; 20 knots (37 km/h) submerged
- Range: 5,500 nautical miles (10,200 km; 6,300 mi) at 12 knots
- Complement: 75
- Sensors & processing systems: ZPS-4 surface search radar; ZQQ-3 passive sonar; SQS-36J active sonar
- Electronic warfare & decoys: ZLA-5 ESM
- Armament: 6 × 533 mm (21 in) Bow torpedo tubes; 12 × type 72 torpedo; 6–8 × Mk 37 torpedo

JDS Takashio (SS-571) was the sixth boat of the Uzushio-class submarines. She was commissioned on 30 January 1976.

== Construction and career ==
Takashio was laid down at Mitsubishi Heavy Industries Kobe Shipyard on 6 July 1973 and launched on 30 June 1975. She was commissioned on 30 January 1976, into the 1st Submarine Group.

On March 7, 1978, the 6th Submarine was newly formed under the 1st Submarine Group, and was incorporated with Yaeshio commissioned on the same day.

She participated in Hawaii dispatch training from August 18 to November 16, 1979, and again from January 18 to April 19, 1984.

On July 6, 1992, she was reclassified as an auxiliary submarine, her hull number was number changed to ATSS-8004, and she became a ship under the direct control of the 1st Submarine Group.

She was decommissioned on 26 July 1995.
