= JDS Narushio (SS-569) =

Uzushio-class submarine

History

Japan
- Name: Narushio; (なるしお)
- Ordered: 1970
- Builder: Mitsubishi, Kobe
- Laid down: 8 May 1971
- Launched: 22 November 1972
- Commissioned: 28 September 1973
- Decommissioned: 17 March 1993
- Reclassified: ATSS-8002
- Home port: Kure
- Identification: Pennant number: SS-569
- Fate: Sunk as target, August 1994

General characteristics
- Class & type: Uzushio-class submarine
- Displacement: 1,850 tonne (1,821 ton) standard, 3,600 tonne (3,543 ton) submerged
- Length: 72.0 m (236.2 ft)
- Beam: 9.9 m (32 ft)
- Draught: 7.5 m (25 ft)
- Depth: 10.1 m (33 ft)
- Propulsion: 1-shaft diesel-electric; 2 × Kawasaki-MAN V8V24/30AMTL diesel; 3,400 bhp (2,500 kW) (surfaced); 7,200 shp (5,400 kW) (submerged)
- Speed: 12 knots (22 km/h) surfaced; 20 knots (37 km/h) submerged
- Range: 5,500 nautical miles (10,200 km; 6,300 mi) at 12 knots
- Complement: 80
- Sensors & processing systems: ZPS-4 surface search radar; ZQQ-2 passive sonar; SQS-4 active sonar
- Electronic warfare & decoys: ZLA-5 ESM
- Armament: 6 × 533 mm (21 in) Bow torpedo tubes; 12 × type 72 torpedo; 6–8 × Mk 37 torpedo

JDS Narushio (SS-569) was the fourth boat of the Uzushio-class submarines. She was commissioned on 28 September 1973.

== Construction and career ==
Narushio was laid down at Mitsubishi Heavy Industries Kobe Shipyard on 8 May 1971 and launched on 22 November 1972. She was commissioned on 25 November 1972, into the 1st Submarine Group.

On 28 September 1973, she was transferred to the 5th Submarine, which was newly commissioned under the 1st Submarine Group, along with Isoshio.

During the Yuyo Maru No.10 Incident that occurred on 9 November 1974, Narushio was dispatched along with Haruna, Takatsuki, Mochizuki and Yukikaze to sink the 10th Yuyo Maru, which had fallen into difficulty extinguishing the fire. After arriving at the disposal area on the afternoon of November 28, Narushio launched a salvo of torpedoes and fired four Mk37 torpedoes at Yuyo Maru No.10, but due to mechanical failures, misalignment, and lack of warhead power, the ship failed to sink.

Narushio participated in Hawaii dispatch training from July 24 to October 15, 1976, and again from January 28 to April 24, 1980.

At around 12:47 pm on March 25, 1982, she ran aground in a shallow water about 3 km north-northwest of the Hesaki Lighthouse at the east exit of the Kanmon Straits due to a mistake in maneuvering while returning to Kure. After 6 pm, she took off on her own due to the rising tide.

On 8 June 1990, she was reclassified to special service submarine ATSS-8002, and became a ship under the direct control of the 1st submarine group.

She was decommissioned on 17 March 1993.
