= Marcílio Dias-class destroyer (1973) =

Class of destroyers of the Brazilian Navy

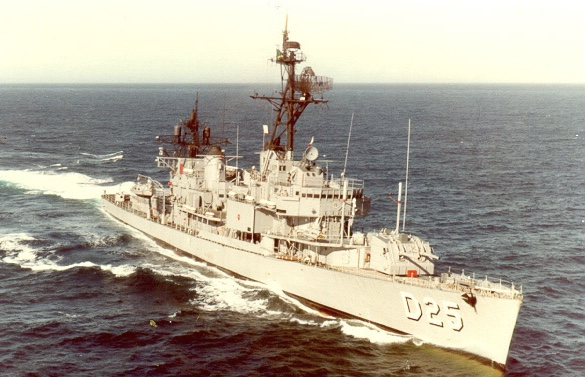
- Marcílio Dias, 1975

Class overview
- Name: Marcílio Dias class
- Builders: Consolidated Steel Corporation
- Operators: Brazilian Navy
- Preceded by: Pará class (1959)
- Succeeded by: Pará class (1989)
- Built: 1944–1945
- In commission: 1973–1997
- Planned: 2
- Completed: 2
- Retired: 2

General characteristics
- Type: Destroyer
- Displacement: 2,616 long tons (2,658 t) standard; 3,460 long tons (3,520 t) full load
- Length: 390.5 ft (119.0 m)
- Beam: 40.9 ft (12.5 m)
- Draft: 14.3 ft (4.4 m)
- Installed power: 4 × boilers; 60,000 shp (45,000 kW)
- Propulsion: General Electric steam turbines; 2 × shafts
- Speed: 36.8 knots (68.2 km/h; 42.3 mph)
- Range: 4,500 nmi (8,300 km; 5,200 mi) at 20 kn (37 km/h; 23 mph)
- Complement: 350 as designed
- Sensors & processing systems: 1 × AN/SPS-40 air-search radar; 1 × AN/SPS-10 surface-search radar; 1 × AN/SQS-23 sonar; 1 × Mark 25 Director
- Electronic warfare & decoys: 1 × AN/WLR-1 ECM; 1 × AN/ULQ-6 ECM
- Armament: 2 × twin 5"/38 cal guns; 2 × triple Mark 46 torpedo tubes; 1 × RUR-5 ASROC ASM
- Aircraft carried: 1 × Westland Wasp
- Aviation facilities: Single hangar and helipad

The Marcílio Dias-class destroyer is a class of destroyers of the Brazilian Navy. Two ships of the Gearing class were lent by the United States Navy and were in commission from 1973 until 1997.

== Development and design ==
Marcílio Dias was commissioned as USS Henry W. Tucker on 12 March 1945 and Espírito Santo was commissioned as USS Brinkley Bass on 1 October 1945.

The propulsion system and auxiliary equipment consisted of three GE turbines, high pressure cruise and low pressure with reverse gear; 60,000 HP of total power, Falk double reduction gears, which drove two laminated steel propellers, four blades, 4.86 m in diameter; maximum speed 33 knots; maximum speed maintained 30 knots; economic speed 10 knots; 1,746 miles of range at maximum maintained speed; 6,267 miles at economy speed; two electro-hydraulic vertical rudders; driven by Waterbury pumps and by a 3SHP electric motor, 440 volts, three-phase, 60 cycles, governed from the bridge via a tiller, from the helm machine via a wheel and from the helm machine, directly actuating the piston control rod the Waterbury pump.

Four Babcock & Wilcox delta type express boilers with economizer and integral interbeam superheater, with superheat degree control up to 850°F; two GE turbogenerators, 500 kW, 440 volts, 60 cycles, three-phase and 50 kW, direct current 117 volts; two diesel emergency generators GM, 100 Kw, 440 volts, 60 cycles, three-phase; a high-pressure, 3,000 psi, vertical turbocharger; two Consolidate Steel Corp. distillation groups, 12,000 gallons/day and 4,000 gallons/day; 718 t of fuel oil capacity; 7,025 gallons, 6,048 liters of lubricating oil capacity.

In addition to several conventional communications equipment (transmitters, transceivers and receivers), they had: AN/SPS-10D surface-search radar; AN/SPS-40 air-search radar and Mark 25 fire-direction radar. AN/SQS-23F sonar; AN UQC underwater phone equipment; active and passive electronic warfare equipment AN/ULQ-6, CNE WLRI and MAGE.

For navigation, they had: radio direction finding device JLD-1000 Direction Finder; Sperry MKll gyro needle, model c; Lionel-13495 MKl magnetic needle; Lionel 3344MK magnetic needle (government); ET/SON-3v-Coester SA echo sounder; equipment for Omega navigation, in addition to nautical instruments necessary for astronomical and coastal navigation.

On 18 April 1975, with the Marcílio Dias was anchored in Guanabara Bay, a Westland Wasp helicopter landed on board a destroyer for the first time.

== Ships in the class ==
Marcílio Dias class							
Hull no.	Name	Builder	Laid down	Launched	Acquired	Decommissioned	Fate
D25	Marcílio Dias	Consolidated Steel Corporation	29 May 1944	8 November 1944	3 December 1973	31 August 1994	Sunk as target, 1994
D26	Mariz e Barros	Consolidated Steel Corporation	20 December 1944	26 May 1945	3 December 1973	1 September 1997	Sunk as target, 2000
