= Pontra Maris =

Multipurpose barge, launched 1970

History
- Name: Pontra Maris
- Owner: Stemat Marine Service, Netherlands
- Operator: Visser Smit Marine Contracting
- Port of registry: Rotterdam
- Builder: De Hoop Scheepswerf Heusden, Netherlands
- Identification: IMO number: 8646343

General characteristics
- Tonnage: 1,605 tons
- Length: 70 m
- Beam: 24 m
- Draught: 2.2 m
- Propulsion: Stern thrusters:
- Speed: 9.4

The Pontra Maris is a multipurpose/cable-laying barge owned by Stemat Marine Services in Rotterdam. It was constructed at Verolme Scheepswerf Heusden N.V. shipyard in Heusden, Netherlands, and first launched in 1970.
