= USS Lloyd Thomas =

USS Lloyd Thomas has been the name of more than one United States Navy ship, and may refer to:

- USS Lloyd Thomas (DE-312), a destroyer escort cancelled in 1944 prior to launching
- USS Lloyd Thomas (DE-374), a destroyer escort cancelled in 1944 prior to construction
- USS Lloyd Thomas (DD-764), a destroyer in commission from 1947 to 1973
