= JDS Yaeshio (SS-572) =

Uzushio-class submarines

History

Japan
- Name: Yaeshio; (やえしお)
- Ordered: 1973
- Builder: Kawasaki, Kobe
- Laid down: 14 April 1975
- Launched: 19 May 1977
- Commissioned: 7 March 1978
- Decommissioned: 1 August 1996
- Reclassified: ATSS-8005
- Home port: Kure
- Identification: Pennant number: SS-572
- Fate: Scrapped

General characteristics
- Class & type: Uzushio-class submarine
- Displacement: 1,850 tonne (1,821 ton) standard, 3,600 tonne (3,543 ton) submerged
- Length: 72.0 m (236.2 ft)
- Beam: 9.9 m (32 ft)
- Draught: 7.5 m (25 ft)
- Depth: 10.1 m (33 ft)
- Propulsion: 1-shaft diesel-electric; 2 × Kawasaki-MAN V8V24/30AMTL diesel; 3,400 bhp (2,500 kW) (surfaced); 7,200 shp (5,400 kW) (submerged)
- Speed: 12 knots (22 km/h) surfaced; 20 knots (37 km/h) submerged
- Range: 5,500 nautical miles (10,200 km; 6,300 mi) at 12 knots
- Complement: 75
- Sensors & processing systems: ZPS-4 surface search radar; ZQQ-3 passive sonar; SQS-36J active sonar
- Electronic warfare & decoys: ZLA-5 ESM
- Armament: 6 × 533 mm (21 in) Bow torpedo tubes; 12 × type 72 torpedo; 6–8 × Mk 37 torpedo

JDS Yaeshio (SS-572) was the seventh boat of the Uzushio-class submarines. She was commissioned on 7 March 1978.

== Construction and career ==
Yaeshio was laid down at Kawasaki Heavy Industries Kobe Shipyard on 14 April 1975 and launched on 19 May 1977. She was commissioned on 7 March 1978, into the 1st Submarine Group.

She participated in Hawaii dispatch training from January 19 to April 22, 1982.

On 14 August 1994, she was reclassified as auxiliary submarine ATSS-8005, becoming a ship under the direct control of the 1st Submarine Group.

She was decommissioned on 1 August 1996.
