= Boyacá =

Boyacá is the name of a region in Colombia. It may refer to other connections to Colombia:

- Battle of Boyacá
- Boyacá Department (Gran Colombia)
- Boyacá Department
  - Boyacá, Boyacá, a municipality
- Boyacá State, a former state
- Puerto Boyacá, a town and municipality in the Boyacá Department

In Bogotá

- Boyacá (TransMilenio), a bus station
- Puente de Boyacá, a bridge

In Tunja

- Boyacá Chicó F.C.
