= JDS Uzushio (SS-566) =

Uzushio-class submarines

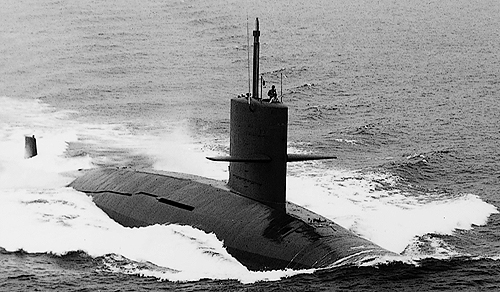
- JDS Uzushio

History

Japan
- Name: Uzushio; (うずしお)
- Namesake: Uzushio
- Ordered: 1967
- Builder: Kawasaki, Kobe
- Laid down: 25 September 1968
- Launched: 11 March 1970
- Commissioned: 21 January 1971
- Decommissioned: 24 March 1986
- Home port: Kure
- Identification: Pennant number: SS-566
- Fate: Scrapped, February 1989

General characteristics
- Class & type: Uzushio-class submarine
- Displacement: 1,850 tonne (1,821 ton) standard, 3,600 tonne (3,543 ton) submerged
- Length: 72.0 m (236.2 ft)
- Beam: 9.9 m (32 ft)
- Draught: 7.5 m (25 ft)
- Depth: 10.1 m (33 ft)
- Propulsion: 1-shaft diesel-electric; 2 × Kawasaki-MAN V8V24/30AMTL diesel; 3,400 bhp (2,500 kW) (surfaced); 7,200 shp (5,400 kW) (submerged)
- Speed: 12 knots (22 km/h) surfaced; 20 knots (37 km/h) submerged
- Range: 5,500 nautical miles (10,200 km; 6,300 mi) at 12 knots
- Complement: 80
- Sensors & processing systems: ZPS-4 surface search radar; ZQQ-1 passive sonar; SQS-4 active sonar
- Electronic warfare & decoys: ZLA-5 ESM
- Armament: 6 × 533 mm (21 in) Bow torpedo tubes; 12 × type 72 torpedo; 6–8 × Mk 37 torpedo

JDS Uzushio (SS-566) was the lead boat of the Uzushio-class submarines. She was commissioned on 21 January 1971.

== Construction and career ==
Uzushio was laid down at Kawasaki Heavy Industries Kobe Shipyard on 25 September 1968 and launched on 11 March 1970. She was commissioned on 21 January 1971, into the 1st Submarine Group as their flagship.

On 2 February 1972, she was transferred to the 4th Submarine, which was newly commissioned under the 1st Submarine Group, along with Makishio, who was commissioned on the same day.

On 16 October 1973, the 4th Submarine was reorganized into the 2nd Submarine Group, which was newly formed under the Self-Defense Fleet .

Participated in Hawaii dispatch training from August 16 to November 1, 1974.

She was decommissioned on 24 March 1987. The number of dives was 1,226, the time underwater was 28,244 hours and 34 minutes, the number of surfaced hours was 8,705 hours and 23 minutes, and the total itinerary was 218,125.3 nautical miles.
