= JDS Kuroshio (SS-570) =

Uzushio-class submarine

History

Japan
- Name: Kuroshio (くろしお)
- Namesake: Kuroshio
- Ordered: 1971
- Builder: Kawasaki, Kobe
- Laid down: 5 July 1972
- Launched: 22 February 1974
- Commissioned: 27 November 1974
- Decommissioned: 1 March 1994
- Reclassified: ATSS-8003
- Home port: Kure
- Identification: Pennant number: SS-570
- Fate: Sunk as target

General characteristics
- Class & type: Uzushio-class submarine
- Displacement: 1,850 tonne (1,821 ton) standard, 3,600 tonne (3,543 ton) submerged
- Length: 72.0 m (236.2 ft)
- Beam: 9.9 m (32 ft)
- Draught: 7.5 m (25 ft)
- Depth: 10.1 m (33 ft)
- Propulsion: 1-shaft diesel-electric; 2 × Kawasaki-MAN V8V24/30AMTL diesel; 3,400 bhp (2,500 kW) (surfaced); 7,200 shp (5,400 kW) (submerged)
- Speed: 12 knots (22 km/h) surfaced; 20 knots (37 km/h) submerged
- Range: 5,500 nautical miles (10,200 km; 6,300 mi) at 12 knots
- Complement: 80
- Sensors & processing systems: ZPS-4 surface search radar; ZQQ-2 passive sonar; SQS-4 active sonar
- Electronic warfare & decoys: ZLA-5 ESM
- Armament: 6 × 533 mm (21 in) Bow torpedo tubes; 12 × type 72 torpedo; 6–8 × Mk 37 torpedo

JDS Kuroshio (SS-570) was the fifth boat of the Uzushio-class submarines. She was commissioned on 27 November 1974.

== Construction and career ==
Kuroshio was laid down at Kawasaki Heavy Industries Kobe Shipyard on 5 July 1972 and launched on 22 February 1974. She was commissioned on 27 November 1974, into the 2nd Submarine Group.

She participated in Hawaii dispatch training from 12 July to 6 October 1978, and again from 23 September to 23 December 1982.

21 March 1989, the 1st Diving Corps group is incorporated into the 5th Diving Corps and transferred to Kure.

On 20 March 1991, she was reclassified as special service submarine ATSS-8003, and became a ship under the direct control of the 1st Submarine Group.

She was decommissioned on 1 March 1994.
