= Italian ship Andrea Doria =

Andrea Doria has been borne by five ships of the Italian military and merchant navy, after Andrea Doria and may refer to:

- Italian ironclad Andrea Doria, a pre-dreadnought battleship completed in 1891, stricken in 1911, used as a defensive floating battery during World War I, and scrapped in 1929
- Italian battleship Andrea Doria, a dreadnought battleship completed in 1916 and stricken in 1956 which saw service in both World War I and World War II
- SS Andrea Doria, an ocean liner launched in 1951 and sunk in 1956
- Italian cruiser Andrea Doria, a missile-launcher cruiser commissioned in 1964 and decommissioned in 1992
- Italian destroyer Andrea Doria, an Orizzonte-class destroyer commissioned in 2007.

== See also ==
- Andrea Doria-class battleship (1910s–1950s)
- Andrea Doria-class cruiser (1960s–1990s)
