= JDS Makishio (SS-567) =

Uzushio-class submarines

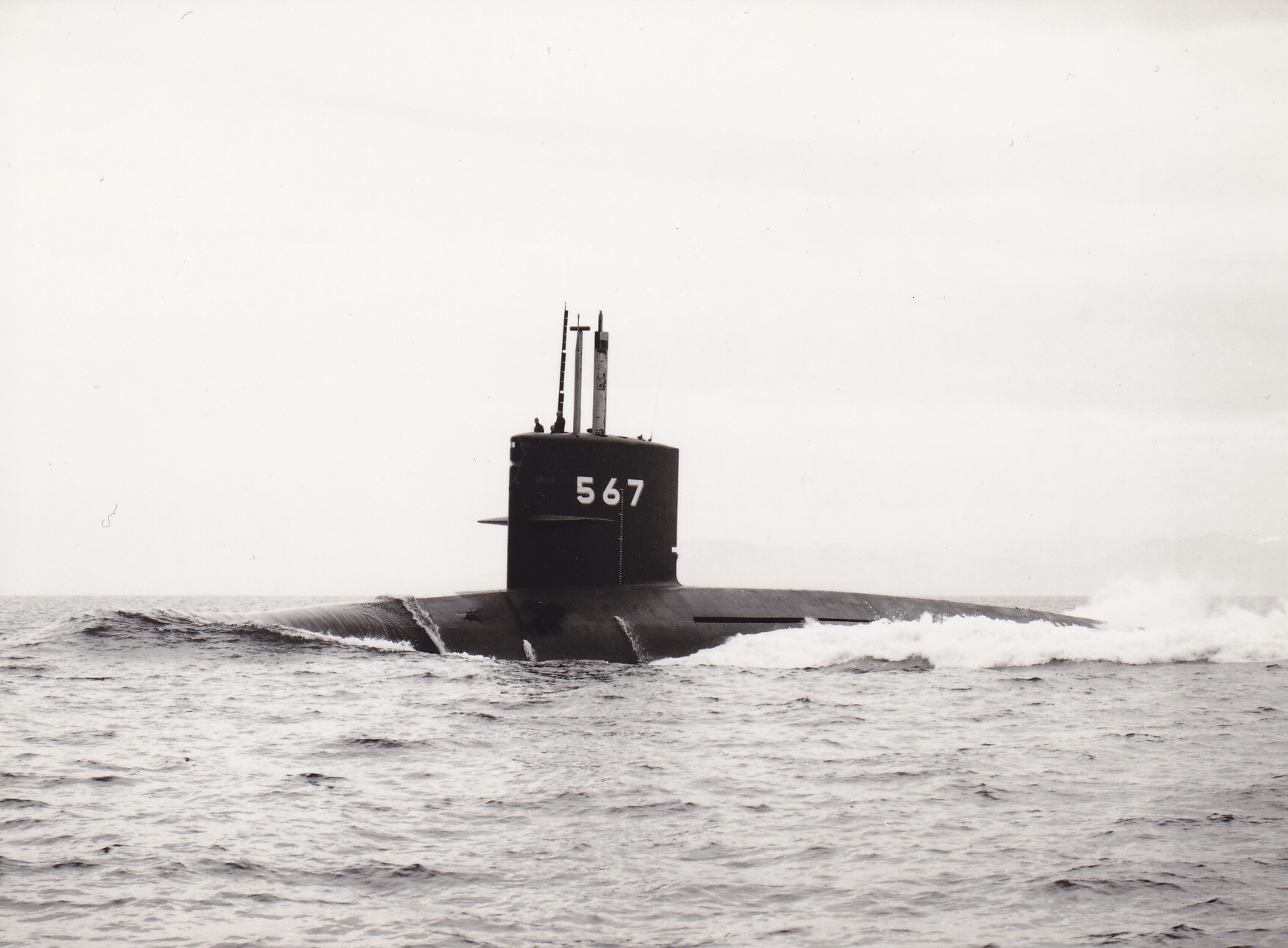
- JDS Makishio

History

Japan
- Name: Makishio; (まきしお)
- Ordered: 1968
- Builder: Mitsubishi, Kobe
- Laid down: 21 June 1969
- Launched: 27 January 1971
- Commissioned: 2 February 1972
- Decommissioned: 11 March 1988
- Home port: Kure
- Identification: Pennant number: SS-567
- Fate: Scrapped, April 1994

General characteristics
- Class & type: Uzushio-class submarine
- Displacement: 1,850 tonne (1,821 ton) standard, 3,600 tonne (3,543 ton) submerged
- Length: 72.0 m (236.2 ft)
- Beam: 9.9 m (32 ft)
- Draught: 7.5 m (25 ft)
- Depth: 10.1 m (33 ft)
- Propulsion: 1-shaft diesel-electric; 2 × Kawasaki-MAN V8V24/30AMTL diesel; 3,400 bhp (2,500 kW) (surfaced); 7,200 shp (5,400 kW) (submerged)
- Speed: 12 knots (22 km/h) surfaced; 20 knots (37 km/h) submerged
- Range: 5,500 nautical miles (10,200 km; 6,300 mi) at 12 knots
- Complement: 80
- Sensors & processing systems: ZPS-4 surface search radar; ZQQ-1 passive sonar; SQS-4 active sonar
- Electronic warfare & decoys: ZLA-5 ESM
- Armament: 6 × 533 mm (21 in) Bow torpedo tubes; 12 × type 72 torpedo; 6–8 × Mk 37 torpedo

JDS Makishio (SS-567) was the second boat of the Uzushio-class submarines. She was commissioned on 2 February 1972.

== Construction and career ==
Makishio was laid down at Mitsubishi Heavy Industries Kobe Shipyard on 21 June 1969 and launched on 27 January 1971. She was commissioned on 2 February 1972, into the 1st Submarine Group together on the same day with Uzushio.

On 16 October 1973, the 4th Submarine was reorganized into the 2nd Submarine Group, which was newly formed under the Self-Defense Fleet.

Makishio participated in dispatch training near Hawaii from 22 September to 14 December 1977, and again from 12 September to 12 December 1980.

She was decommissioned on 11 March 1988 and dismantled by Hisaya Sangyo in Kitakyushu City in April 1994.
