= JS Kuroshio (SS-596) =

Oyashio-class submarines

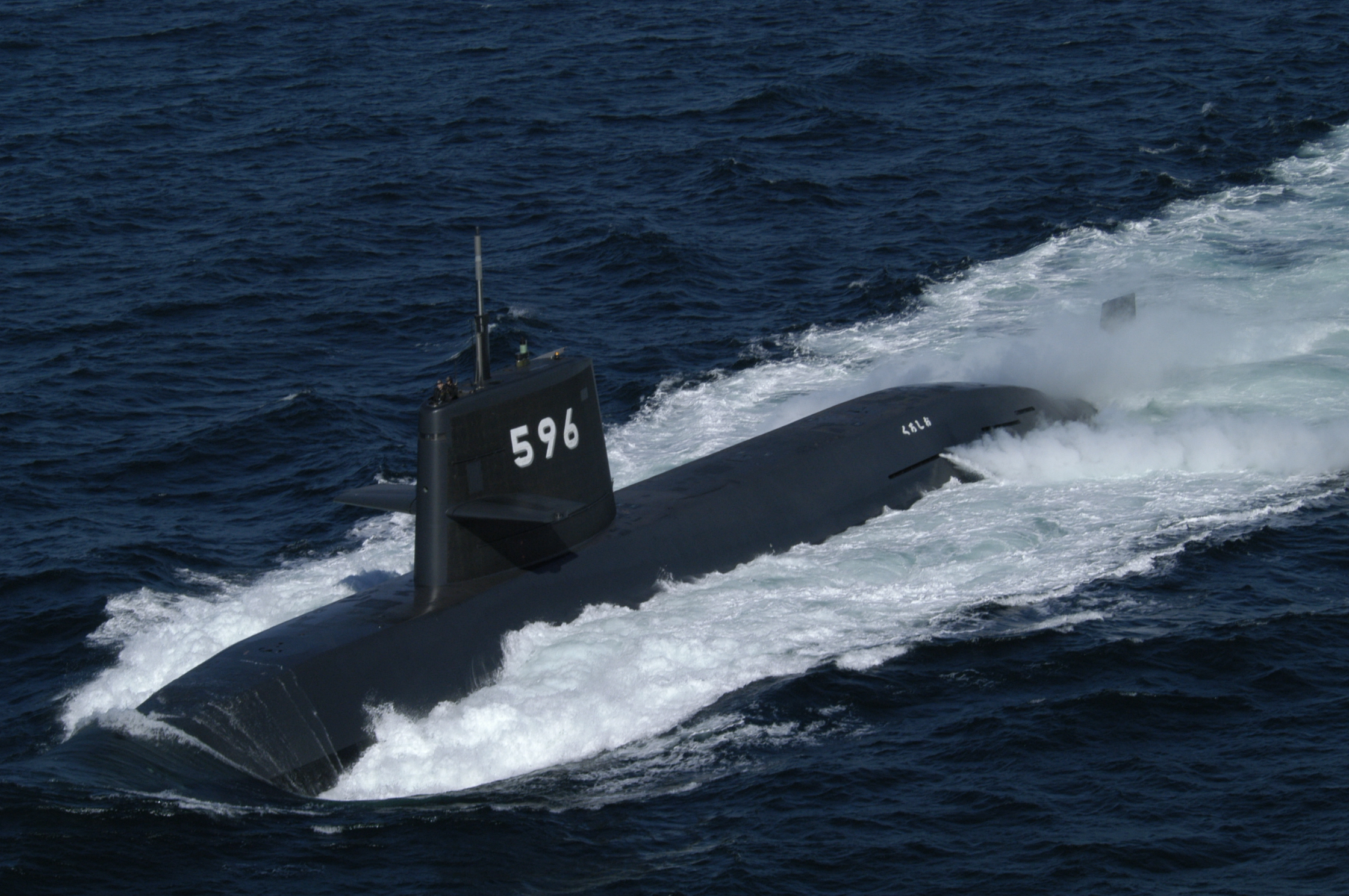
- JS Kuroshio

History

Japan
- Name: Kuroshio; (くろしお)
- Namesake: Kuroshio Current
- Ordered: 1999
- Builder: Kawasaki, Kobe
- Cost: ¥52.19 million
- Laid down: 27 March 2000
- Launched: 23 October 2002
- Commissioned: 8 March 2004
- Home port: Kure
- Identification: Pennant number: SS-596
- Status: Active

General characteristics
- Class & type: Oyashio-class submarine
- Displacement: 2,750 tonnes (surfaced); 4,000 tonnes (submerged)
- Length: 81.7 m (268 ft 1 in)
- Beam: 8.9 m (29 ft 2 in)
- Draught: 7.4 m (24 ft 3 in)
- Propulsion: Diesel-electric; 2 Kawasaki 12V25S diesel engines; 2 Kawasaki alternators; 2 Toshiba motors; 3,400 hp (2,500 kW) surfaced; 7,750 hp (5,780 kW) submerged
- Speed: 12 knots (22 km/h; 14 mph) (surfaced); 20 knots (37 km/h; 23 mph) (submerged)
- Complement: 70 (10 officers)
- Sensors & processing systems: Sonar: Hughes/Oki ZQQ-6 hull-mounted sonar, flank arrays, 1 towed array; Radar: JRC ZPS 6 I-band search radar.
- Armament: 6 × HU-605 21 in (533 mm) torpedo tubes with 20 reloads for: Type 89 torpedoes; UGM-84 Harpoon missiles

JS Kuroshio (hull number SS-596) is the seventh boat of the Oyashio-class submarines built for the Japan Maritime Self-Defense Force. She was commissioned on 8 March 2004. Kuroshio is the third JMSDF submarine named for the Kuroshio Current in the Pacific Ocean, and has remained in active service for 22 years as of March 2026.

== Construction and career ==
Kuroshio was laid down at Kawasaki Heavy Industries Kobe Shipyard on 27 March 2000 and launched on 23 October 2003. She was commissioned on 8 March 2004 and deployed to Kure.

The vessel participated in RIMPAC 2006 from 26 June to 28 July 2006.

On 15 March 2011, she was transferred to the 3rd Submarine Group of the 1st Submarine Group.

From 23 September to 19 December 2015, she participated in RIMPAC 2015.

On 27 August 2018, she left Kure and entered the South China Sea through the Bashi Channel between Taiwan and the Philippines. After that, she joined three ships including the escort ship JS Kaga of the Indo-Pacific dispatch training unit, and conducted anti-submarine warfare training in the South China Sea on 13 September. After that, from 17–21 September, the vessel called at the Port of Cam Ranh, Vietnam and carried out a goodwill visit to the Vietnam People's Navy submarine unit.
