= JS Shirayuki =

Destroyer of the Japan Maritime Self-Defense Force

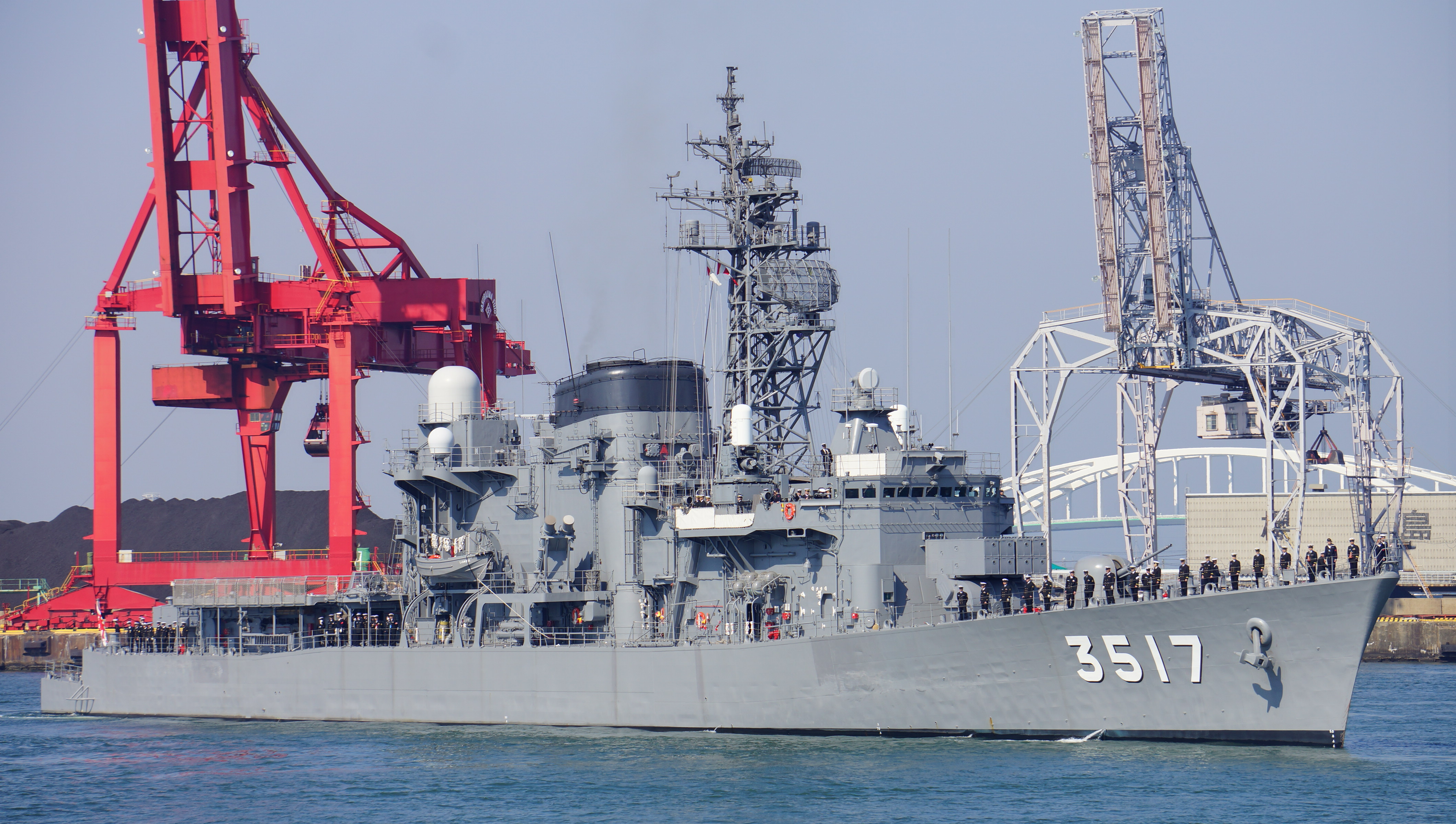
- JS Shirayuki（TV-3517）on 23 March 2014

History

Japan
- Name: Shirayuki; (しらゆき)
- Ordered: 1978
- Builder: Hitachi, Osaka
- Laid down: 3 December 1979
- Launched: 4 August 1981
- Commissioned: 8 February 1982
- Decommissioned: 27 April 2016
- Stricken: 30 January 2017
- Home port: Yokosuka
- Identification: MMSI number: 431999557; Hull number: DD-123
- Reclassified: TV-3517
- Fate: Scrapped

General characteristics
- Class & type: Hatsuyuki-class destroyer
- Displacement: 2,950 tons standard, 4,000 tons hull load
- Length: 130 m (426 ft 6 in)
- Beam: 13.6 m (44 ft 7 in)
- Draft: 4.2 m (13 ft 9 in); 4.4 m (14 ft 5 in) (DD 129 to DD 132)
- Propulsion: 2 × KHI-RR TM3B gas turbines, 45,000 shp (34 MW); 2 × KHI-RR RM1C gas turbines, 9,900 shp (7.4 MW); 2 shafts, cp props
- Speed: 30 knots (56 km/h; 35 mph)
- Complement: 200
- Sensors & processing systems: OYQ-5 tactical data system; FCS-2 fire-control system; OPS-14 air search radar; OPS-18 surface search radar; OQS-4 hull sonar; OQR-1 TASS (in some ships)
- Electronic warfare & decoys: NOLR-6C intercept; OLT-3 jammer; Mark 36 SRBOC; Towed torpedo decoys
- Armament: 1 × OTO Melara 76 mm gun; 2 × 20 mm Phalanx CIWS; 2 × Harpoon SSM quad canisters; 1 × Sea Sparrow SAM octuple launcher; 1 × ASROC octuple launcher; 2 × triple 324 mm torpedo tubes
- Aircraft carried: 1 × HSS-2B or SH-60J helicopter
- Aviation facilities: Hangar and helipad

JS Shirayuki (DD-123/TV-3517) was a Hatsuyuki-class destroyer of the Japan Maritime Self-Defense Force. The ship was commissioned in 1982.

== Design ==
The Hatsuyuki class were designed as multi-purpose ships, with a balanced armament and sensor fit, so that the ships could carry out anti-submarine and anti-surface ship operations while being capable of defending themselves against air attack. A hangar and flight deck are carried for a single helicopter, which was initially the Mitsubishi HSS-2, a license-built Sikorsky Sea King, later replaced by Mitsubishi H-60s (licensed Sikorsky S-70s), with the Canadian Beartrap haul-down system fitted to ease operations of large helicopters. An octuple Mk 112 launcher for ASROC anti-submarine missiles is fitted forward, while additional close-in anti-submarine armament is provided by two triple 324 mm torpedo-tubes for Mark 46 anti-submarine torpedoes. The initial anti-aircraft armament consisted of a Sea Sparrow surface-to-air missile launcher aft, with an OTO Melara 76 mm gun forward. Eight Harpoon anti-ship missiles are carried in two quadruple mounts abaft the ship's funnel.

== Construction and career ==
Shirayuki was ordered as part of the Japan Self-Defense Forces 1978 defense estimates as the second ship of the Hatsuyuki class, and was laid down at Hitachi's Maizuru shipyard on 3 December 1979. The ship was launched on 4 August 1981, and commissioned on 8 February 1983.

On 8 July 2013, Shirayuki, JS Kashima and JS Isoyuki were anchored at Halifax, Nova Scotia, Canada. From 22 to 25 July, they left for a visit to Portsmouth, United Kingdom. After leaving Portsmouth, they sailed for Gdańsk Bay, Poland on 6 August then on 20 August, Brest, France. All three Japanese ships later made a four-day trip to Da Nang, Vietnam, was made on 21 October for the 40th anniversary of diplomatic ties between the two countries. On 25 November, they passed the Kiel Canal in Germany.

On 16 February 2015, Shirayuki, JS Matsuyuki and JS Yūgiri made a goodwill visit to Muara Port, Brunei Darussalam.

Shirayuki was decommissioned on 27 April 2016.
