= Anti-submarine drone =

Anti-submarine drones are unmanned surface vehicles designed to stalk and hunt submarines. They are an emerging technology with a prototype ACTUV being designed by DARPA as a potentially smaller, more efficient Anti-submarine warfare capability for the United States Navy.

== See also ==
Unmanned aerial vehicle
