= Uzushio-class submarine =

Submarine class of the JMSDF

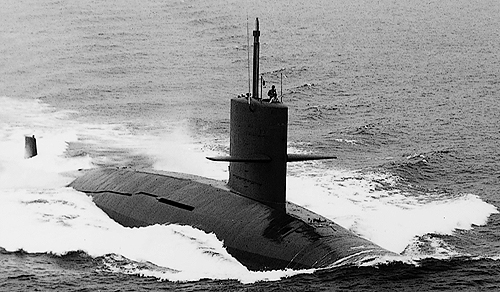
- Uzushio (SS-566)

Class overview
- Name: Uzushio
- Builders: Kawasaki Shipbuilding Corporation, Mitsubishi Heavy Industries
- Operators: Japan Maritime Self-Defense Force
- Preceded by: Asashio class
- Succeeded by: Yūshio class
- Built: 1968–1978
- In commission: 1971–1996
- Planned: 8
- Completed: 7
- Canceled: 1
- Retired: 7

General characteristics
- Type: Submarine
- Displacement: 1,850 t (1,820 long tons) standard; 3,600 t (3,500 long tons) submerged
- Length: 72.0 m (236 ft 3 in) pp
- Beam: 9.9 m (32 ft 6 in)
- Draught: 7.5 m (24 ft 7 in) max
- Propulsion: 1-shaft diesel-electric; 2 × Kawasaki-MAN V8V24/30AMTL diesel engines; 3,400 bhp (2,500 kW) (surfaced); 7,200 shp (5,400 kW) (submerged)
- Speed: 12 knots (22 km/h; 14 mph) surfaced; 20 knots (37 km/h; 23 mph) submerged
- Test depth: 200 m (660 ft)
- Complement: 80
- Sensors & processing systems: ZPS-4 surface search radar; ZQQ-1, ZQQ-2, ZQQ-3 passive sonar; SQS-4, SQS-36J active sonar
- Electronic warfare & decoys: ZLA-5 ESM
- Armament: 6 × 533 mm (21 in) torpedo tubes; Type 89 torpedoes

The Uzushio-class submarine was a series of seven submarines in service with Japanese Maritime Self Defense Force during the Cold War between 1972 and the mid-1990s. They were the first generation of the teardrop type submarine that valued the underwater performance against that of the preceding conventional-hull type Asashio class. Many were converted to training submarines (ATSS) towards the end of their lives.

== General characteristics ==
The Uzushio class was the first Japan Maritime Self-Defense Force submarine design to incorporate the teardrop hull. The Uzushios had a double hull construction which used NS-63 high-tensile steel to allow for a deeper diving depth of 200 metres (660 ft). The submarines measured 72.0 metres (236 ft 3 in) long between perpendiculars and 9.9 m (32 ft 6 in) at the beam. They had a maximum draught of 7.5 m (24 ft 7 in) and had a standard displacement of 1,850 tonnes (1,820 long tons) and a 3,600 t (3,500 long tons) displacement when submerged. (Note: Sharpe has the tonnages as 1,850 t (1,820 long tons) standard, 1,900 t (1,900 long tons) surfaced and 2,430 t (2,390 long tons) submerged.)

The submarines were powered by a diesel-electric system composed of two Kawasaki-MAN V8V24/30AMTL diesel engines and two electric motors turning one shaft creating 3,400 brake horsepower (2,500 kW) surfaced and 7,200 shaft horsepower (5,400 kW) submerged. (Note: Sharpe has the submarines with only a single electric motor.) This gave the boats a maximum speed of 12 knots (22 km/h; 14 mph) surfaced and 20 knots (37 km/h; 23 mph) dived. The submarines incorporated a separate emergency blowing system to all the vessels to surface rapidly and had a 3D automatic steering system which combined automatic depth and automatic direction maintenance systems.

The Uzushios were armed with Japanese Type 89 torpedoes fired from six 533-millimetre (21 in) torpedo tubes located amidships. The submarines had their sonar array located in the bow which was composed of a ZPS-4 surface search sonar, a ZQQ-2, ZQQ-3, or ZQQ-4 passive/active search sonar suite and a SQS-36J or SQS-4 active sonar.

== Boats ==
Project no.	Building no.	Pennant no.	Name	Laid down	Launched	Commissioned	Note
S118	8081	SS-566	Uzushio (うずしお)	25 September 1968	11 March 1970	21 January 1971	Decommissioned 24 March 1987, scrapped
S118	8082	SS-567	Makishio (まきしお)	21 June 1969	27 January 1971	2 February 1972	Decommissioned 11 March 1988, scrapped
S119	8083	SS-568/ ATSS-8001	Isoshio (いそしお)	9 July 1970	18 March 1972	25 November 1972	Converted to auxiliary training submarine (ATSS-8001) on 24 March 1989, decommissioned 25 March 1992, sunk as target off Izu Ōshima August 1994
S119	8084	SS-569/ ATSS-8002	Narushio (なるしお)	8 May 1971	22 November 1972	28 September 1973	Converted to auxiliary training submarine (ATSS-8002) on 8 June 1990, decommissioned 15 March 1993, scrapped
S119	8085	SS-570/ ATSS-8003	Kuroshio (くろしお)	5 July 1972	22 February 1974	27 November 1974	Converted to auxiliary training submarine (ATSS-8003) on 20 March 1991, decommissioned 1 March 1994, scrapped
S119A	8086	SS-571/ ATSS-8004	Takashio (たかしお)	6 July 1973	30 June 1975	30 January 1976	Converted to auxiliary training submarine (ATSS-8004) on 6 June 1992, decommissioned 26 July 1995, scrapped
S119A	8087	SS-572/ ATSS-8005	Yaeshio (やえしお)	14 April 1975	19 May 1977	7 March 1978	Converted to auxiliary training submarine (ATSS-8005) on 14 August 1994, decommissioned 1 August 1996, scrapped
S119A	~	One hull canceled because of the 1973 oil crisis, naval budget was used for the Chikugo-class destroyer escort and others.					

== See also ==
Equivalent submarines of the same era

- Kalvari class
- Type 035
- Potvis class
- Tango class
