= List of ship launches in 1961 =

The list of ship launches in 1961 includes a chronological list of all ships launched in 1961.

Date	Ship	Class / type	Builder	Location	Country	Notes
2 January	Bryher	Fishing trawler	Brooke Marine Ltd.	Lowestoft	United Kingdom	For W. H. Podd Ltd.
9 January	Carlton Queen	Fishing trawler	Brooke Marine Ltd.	Lowestoft	United Kingdom	For Talisman Trawlers Ltd.
17 January	Transvaal Castle	Ocean liner	John Brown & Company	Clydebank	United Kingdom	For Union-Castle Line
17 January	Isuzu	Isuzu-class destroyer escort			Japan	For Japan Maritime Self-Defense Force
19 January	British Cormorant	Tanker	Harland & Wolff	Belfast	United Kingdom	For British Tanker Company.
31 January	Gridley	Leahy-class cruiser	Puget Sound Bridge and Drydock Company	Seattle, Washington	United States	For United States Navy
31 January	Tindfonn	Tanker	Harland & Wolff	Belfast	United Kingdom	For Sigval Bergsen.
1 February	Saskatchewan	Mackenzie-class destroyer	Victoria Machinery Depot	Victoria, British Columbia	Canada	For Royal Canadian Navy
2 February	Sam Houston	Ethan Allen-class submarine	Newport News Shipbuilding	Newport News, Virginia	United States	For United States Navy
1 March	Port Alfred	Refrigerated cargo ship	Harland & Wolff	Belfast	United Kingdom	For Port Line.
7 March	Mogami	Isuzu-class destroyer escort			Japan	For Japan Maritime Self-Defense Force
7 March	Wilronwood	Fishing trawler	Brooke Marine Ltd.	Lowestoft	United Kingdom	For Wilronwood Fishing Co. Ltd.
16 March	Hampshire	County-class destroyer	John Brown & Company	Clydebank	United Kingdom	For Royal Navy
17 March	Ariadne III	Motor yacht	Atlantic Shipbuilding Co. Ltd	Newport	United Kingdom	For private owner.
17 March	Chris B	Tug	Atlantic Shipbuilding Co. Ltd	Newport	United Kingdom	For C. H. Bailey Ltd.
17 March	George Peacock	Tanker	Harland & Wolff	Belfast	United Kingdom	For Pacific Steam Navigation Company.
17 March	Sara B	Tug	Atlantic Shipbuilding Co. Ltd	Newport	United Kingdom	For C. H. Bailey Ltd.
26 March	Groznyy	Project 58 Groznyy-class cruiser	A.A. Zhdanov	Leningrad	Soviet Union	For Soviet Navy
29 March	Bombala	Cargo ship	Harland & Wolff	Belfast	United Kingdom	For British India Steam Navigation Company.
8 April	Stuart	River-class destroyer escort	Cockatoo Island Dockyard	Sydney, New South Wales	Australia	For Royal Australian Navy
8 April	Derwent	River-class destroyer escort	Williamstown Naval Dockyard	Melbourne, Victoria	Australia	For Royal Australian Navy
13 April	Dukesgarth	Bulk carrier	Blyth Dry Docks & Shipbuilding Co. Ltd	Blyth, Northumberland	United Kingdom	For St. Denis Shipping Co. Ltd.
15 April	Bainbridge	Bainbridge-class cruiser	Bethlehem Steel	Quincy, Massachusetts	United States	For United States Navy
28 April	Levernbank	Cargo ship	Harland & Wolff	Belfast	United Kingdom	For Bank Line.
20 May	Semmes	Charles F. Adams-class destroyer	Avondale Shipyard	Avondale, Louisiana	United States	For United States Navy
25 May	Mackenzie	Mackenzie-class destroyer	Canadian Vickers	Montreal, Quebec	Canada	For Royal Canadian Navy
31 May	Minerve	Daphné-class submarine	Dubigeon	Nantes	France	For French Navy
31 May	Port St Lawrence	Refrigerated cargo ship	Harland & Wolff	Belfast	United Kingdom	For Bank Line.
15 June	Coralshell	Tanker	J. Bolson & Son Ltd.	Poole	United Kingdom	For Shell Co. of the Bahamas.
15 June	Patrol	Pilot boat	Brooke Marine Ltd.	Lowestoft	United Kingdom	For Trinity House.
15 June	Thomas A. Edison	Ethan Allen-class submarine	Electric Boat	Groton, Connecticut	United States	For United States Navy
26 June	Neckar	Rhine-class tender	Lürssen	Bremen-Vegesack	West Germany	For German Navy
28 June	Leander	Leander-class frigate	Harland and Wolff	Belfast	United Kingdom	For Royal Navy
1 July	Permit	Permit-class submarine	Mare Island Naval Shipyard	Vallejo, California	United States	For United States Navy
1 July	Leahy	Leahy-class cruiser	Bath Iron Works	Bath, Maine	United States	For United States Navy
2 July	Galileo Galilei	Ocean liner	Cantieri Riuniti dell' Adriatico	Monfalcone	Italy	For Lloyd Triestino
15 July	John Marshall	Ethan Allen-class submarine	Newport News Shipbuilding	Newport News, Virginia	United States	For United States Navy
26 July	Maplehurst	Tanker	Blyth Dry Docks & Shipbuilding Co. Ltd	Blyth, Northumberland	United Kingdom	For Stephenson Clarke Ltd.
27 July	Yukon	Mackenzie-class destroyer	Burrard Dry Dock	Vancouver, British Columbia	Canada	For Royal Canadian Navy
29 July	Berkeley	Charles F. Adams-class destroyer	New York Shipbuilding	Camden, New Jersey	United States	For United States Navy
31 July	Hayashio	Hayashio-class submarine			Japan	For Japan Maritime Self-Defense Force
24 August	British Osprey	Tanker	Harland & Wolff	Belfast	United Kingdom	For British Tanker Company.
24 August	Cressington	Dredger	Harland & Wolff	Belfast	United Kingdom	For British Transport Commission.
26 August	Tattnall	Charles F. Adams-class destroyer	Avondale Shipyard	Avondale, Louisiana	United States	For United States Navy
28 August	Preceder	Pilot boat	Brooke Marine Ltd.	Lowestoft	United Kingdom	For Trinity House.
28 August	Sand Snipe	Dredger	J. Bolson & Son Ltd.	Poole	United Kingdom	For South Coast Shipping Co. Ltd.
28 August	Wakashio	Hayashio-class submarine			Japan	For Japan Maritime Self-Defense Force
17 September	Iwo Jima	Iwo Jima-class amphibious assault ship	Puget Sound Navy Yard	Bremerton, Washington	United States	For United States Navy
22 September	Galatée	Daphné-class submarine	Direction des Constructions et Armes Navales	Cherbourg	France	For French Navy
24 September	Guglielmo Marconi	Ocean liner			Italy	For Lloyd Triestino
25 September	Mincarlo	Fishing trawler	Brooke Marine Ltd.	Lowestoft	United Kingdom	For W. H. Podd Ltd.
27 September	Kent	County-class destroyer	Harland and Wolff	Belfast	United Kingdom	For Royal Navy
30 September	Jeanne d'Arc	Helicopter carrier and cruiser hybrid	Arsenal de Brest	Brest, France	France	For French Navy
12 October	Tom Grant	Fishing trawler	Brooke Marine Ltd.	Lowestoft	United Kingdom	For private owner.
21 October	U 1	Type 201 submarine	HDW	Kiel	West Germany	For German Navy
24 October	City of Victoria	V-class ferry	Victoria Machinery Co. Depot Ltd	Victoria	Canada	For BC Ferries
26 October	Springbank	Cargo ship	Harland & Wolff	Belfast	United Kingdom	For Bank Line.
19 November	Admiral Fokin	Project 58 Groznyy-class cruiser	A.A. Zhdanov	Leningrad	Soviet Union	For Soviet Navy
23 November	British Merlin	Tanker	Harland & Wolff	Belfast	United Kingdom	For British Tanker Company.
1 December	Cap San Diego	Cap-San-class bulk cargo	Deutsche Werft AG	Hamburg-Finkenwerder	West Germany	For Hamburg Süd
7 December	London	County-class destroyer	Swan Hunter	Wallsend	United Kingdom	For Royal Navy
9 December	Plunger	Permit-class submarine	Island Naval Shipyard	Vallejo, California	United States	For United States Navy
9 December	Tinosa	Permit-class submarine	Portsmouth Naval Shipyard	Kittery, Maine	United States	For United States Navy
9 December	Harry E. Yarnell	Leahy-class cruiser	Bath Iron Works	Bath, Maine	United States	For United States Navy
9 December	Joseph Strauss	Charles F. Adams-class destroyer	New York Shipbuilding	Camden, New Jersey	United States	For United States Navy
10 December	Nipigon	Annapolis-class destroyer	Marine Industries Limited	Sorel, Quebec	Canada	For Royal Canadian Navy
15 December	Goldsborough	Charles F. Adams-class destroyer	Puget Sound Bridge and Drydock Company	Seattle, Washington	United States	For United States Navy
21 December	Olivebank	Tanker	Harland & Wolff	Belfast	United Kingdom	For Bank Line.
22 December	Dido	Leander-class frigate	Yarrow Shipbuilders	Glasgow	United Kingdom	For Royal Navy
Unknown date	Blanchland	Bulk carrier	William Gray & Co. Ltd.	West Hartlepool	United Kingdom	For Stephenson Clarke Ltd.
Unknown date	Cornishbrook	Tug	Clelands (Successors) Ltd.	Wallsend	United Kingdom	For private owner.
