= Japanese ship Oyashio =

At least three warships of Japan have been named Oyashio:

- Japanese destroyer Oyashio, a Kagerō-class destroyer launched in 1938 and sunk in 1943.
- JDS Oyashio, a submarine launched in 1959 and scrapped in 1977.
- JS Oyashio, an Oyashio-class submarine launched in 1996 and decommissioned in 2023.
