= Wakashio (disambiguation) =

Wakashio (Japanese: わかしお) is a Japanese limited express train service operated by JR East.

Wakashio may also refer to:

- Wakashio Bank, a Japanese bank and financial services company
- MV Wakashio oil spill (2020), off of Pointe d'Esny, Mauritius
- Wakashio (ship), several ships of that name
  - Japanese submarine Wakashio, several submarines
