= Japanese ship Hayashio =

At least three warships of Japan have been named Hayashio:

- Japanese destroyer Hayashio, a Kagerō-class destroyer launched in 1939 and sunk in 1942.
- JDS Hayashio (SS-521), a Hayashio-class submarine launched in 1961 and struck in 1977.
- JDS Hayashio (SS-585), a Harushio-class submarine launched in 1991 and struck in 2011.
