= Oyashio (disambiguation) =

Oyashio refers to the Oyashio Current, an ocean current.

It may also refer to one of the following Japanese warships:

- Japanese destroyer Oyashio, a Kagerō-class destroyer commissioned in 1940
- JDS Oyashio (SS-511), a submarine commissioned in 1960
- Oyashio-class submarine, a class of Japanese submarines
  - JS Oyashio, an Oyashio-class submarine commissioned in 1998
