= Wakashio (ship) =

Wakashio is a ship name, which may refer to:

- Japanese submarine Wakashio
  - JDS Wakashio (SS-522) (1961–1979), a Hayashio-class submarine of the Japan Maritime Self-Defense Force
  - JS Wakashio (1993–2013), a Harushio-class submarine of the Japan Maritime Self-Defense Force
- MV Wakashio (2007–2020; Japanese: わかしお), a Japanese capesize bulk carrier that ran aground and sank, causing an oil spill
