= Japanese submarine Wakashio =

At least two warships of Japan have been named Wakashio:

- JDS Wakashio (SS-522), a Hayashio-class submarine launched in 1961 and struck in 1979.
- JS Wakashio, a Harushio-class submarine launched in 1993 and struck in 2013.

== See also ==
- Wakashio (ship)
