= JS Uzushio =

Oyashio-class submarines

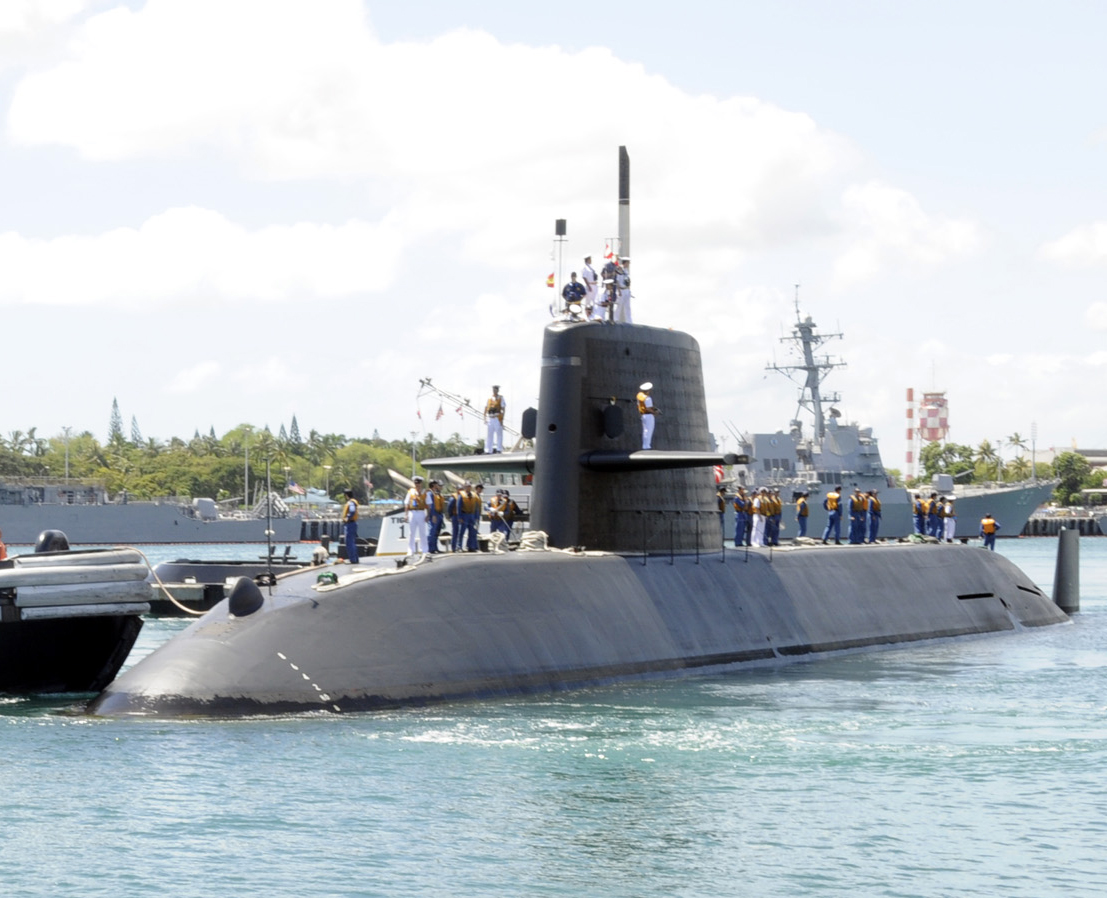
- JS Uzushio at Pearl Harbor on 18 March 2011

History

Japan
- Name: Uzushio; (うずしお)
- Ordered: 1995
- Builder: Kawasaki, Kobe
- Cost: ¥52.19 million
- Laid down: 6 March 1996
- Launched: 26 November 1998
- Commissioned: 9 March 2000
- Decommissioned: 19 December 2025
- Home port: Yokosuka
- Identification: Pennant number: SS-592
- Status: Decommissioned

General characteristics
- Class & type: Oyashio-class submarine
- Displacement: 2,750 tonnes (surfaced); 4,000 tonnes (submerged)
- Length: 81.7 m (268 ft 1 in)
- Beam: 8.9 m (29 ft 2 in)
- Draught: 7.4 m (24 ft 3 in)
- Propulsion: Diesel-electric; 2 Kawasaki 12V25S diesel engines; 2 Kawasaki alternators; 2 Toshiba motors; 3,400 hp (2,500 kW) surfaced; 7,750 hp (5,780 kW) submerged
- Speed: 12 knots (22 km/h; 14 mph) (surfaced); 20 knots (37 km/h; 23 mph) (submerged)
- Complement: 70 (10 officers)
- Sensors & processing systems: Sonar: Hughes/Oki ZQQ-6 hull-mounted sonar, flank arrays, 1 towed array; Radar: JRC ZPS 6 I-band search radar.
- Armament: 6 × HU-605 21 in (533 mm) torpedo tubes with 20 reloads for: Type 89 torpedoes; UGM-84 Harpoon missiles

JS Uzushio (SS-592) was the third boat of the Oyashio-class submarines. She was commissioned on 9 March 2000, and decommissioned in 2025. Having served 25 years in commission, Uzushio is tied with JS Oyashio (SS-590) as the longest-serving Japan Maritime Self-Defense Force submarine in history.

== Construction and career ==
Uzushio was laid down at Kawasaki Heavy Industries Kobe Shipyard on 6 March 1996 and launched on 26 November 1998. She was commissioned on 9 March 2000 and deployed to Yokosuka.

The vessel participated in the major naval exercise RIMPAC 2004 from 19 August to 17 November 2004. The submarine participated in RIMPAC 2007 from 23 August to 29 November 2007.

On 17 January 2011, Uzushio left Yokosuka for training in the United States near Hawaii. Called at Guam on 20 April after the dispatch training was completed. She returned to Kure on the 28th.

Uzushio was decommissioned on 19 December 2025, having logged an equivalent of 12 voyages around the Earth's circumference in mileage during her service life.
