= JS Setogiri =

Asagiri-class destroyer

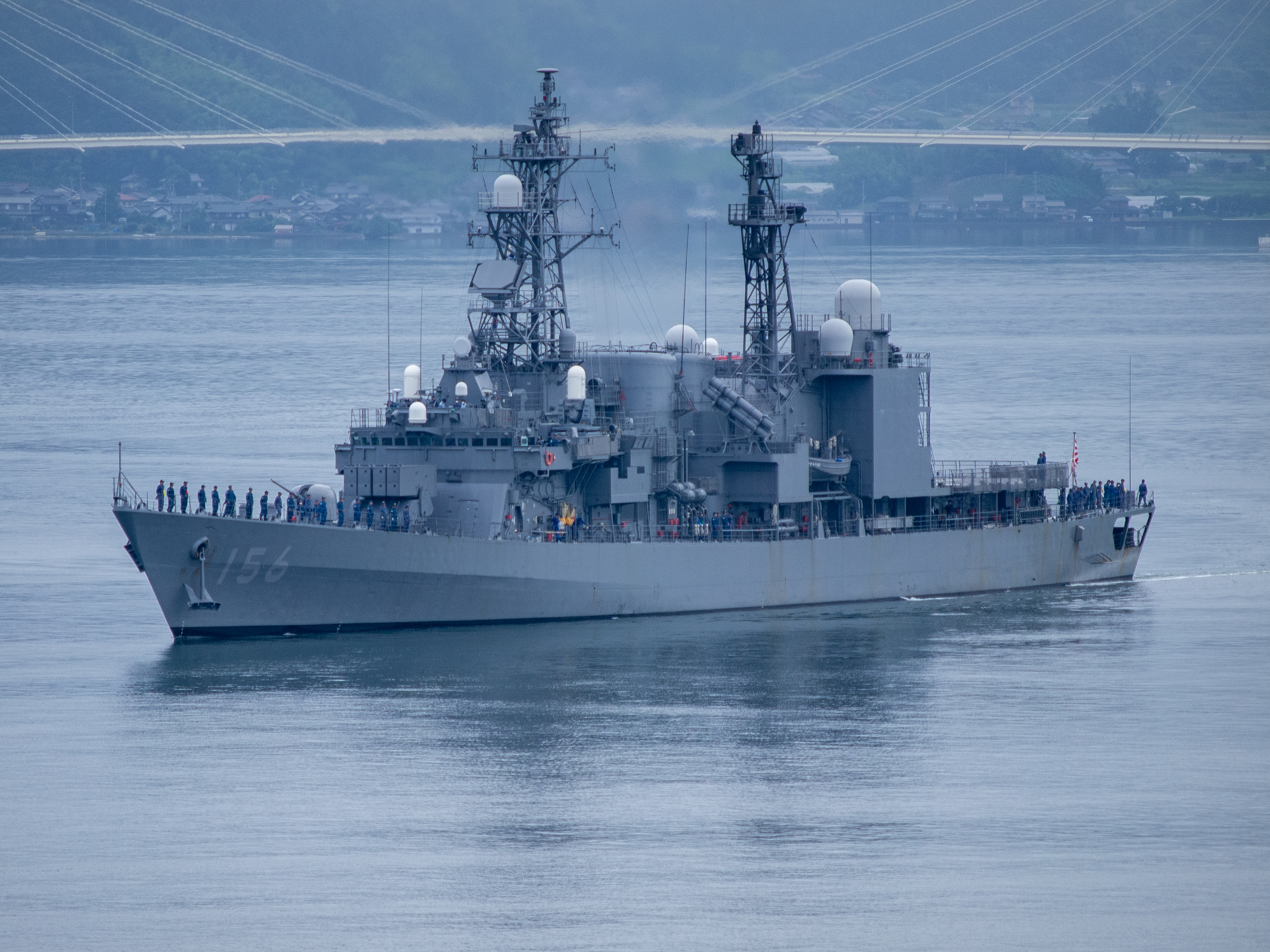
- JS Setogiri at Maizuru on 2023

History

Japan
- Name: Setogiri; (せとぎり)
- Ordered: 1985
- Builder: Hitachi, Maizuru
- Laid down: 9 March 1987
- Launched: 12 September 1988
- Commissioned: 14 February 1990
- Home port: Maizuru
- Identification: MMSI number: 431999518; Pennant number: DD-156
- Status: Active

General characteristics
- Class & type: Asagiri-class destroyer
- Length: 137 m (449 ft 6 in)
- Beam: 14.6 m (47 ft 11 in)
- Draft: 4.5 m (14 ft 9 in)
- Propulsion: 4 gas turbines 54,000 shp (40,000 kW)
- Speed: 30 knots (56 km/h; 35 mph)
- Range: 8,030 nmi (14,870 km; 9,240 mi) at 14 knots (26 km/h; 16 mph)
- Complement: 220
- Sensors & processing systems: OYQ-6/7 CDS (w/ Link-11); OPS-14/24 air search radar; OPS-28 surface search radar; OQS-4A hull sonar; OQR-1 TACTASS
- Electronic warfare & decoys: NOLR-8 intercept; OLT-3 jammer; Mark 36 SRBOC
- Armament: 1 × Otobreda 76 mm gun; 2 × missile canister up to 8 Harpoon SSM; 2 × 20 mm Phalanx CIWS; 1 × Mk.29 Sea Sparrow SAM octuple launcher; 1 × Mk.16 ASROC anti-submarine rocket octuple launcher; 2 × HOS-302A triple 324 mm (12.8 in) torpedo tubes
- Aircraft carried: 1 SH-60J(K) anti-submarine helicopter

JS Setogiri (DD-156) is an Asagiri-class destroyer of the Japan Maritime Self-Defense Force.

== Development and design ==
The Asagiri class is equipped for combat and interception missions, and is primarily armed with anti-ship weapons. They carry two of the Mk-141 Guided Missile Launching System (GMLS), which are anti-ship missile systems. The ships are also fitted to be used against submarines and carry Mk-32 Surface Vessel Torpedo Tubes (SVTT), which can be used as an anti-submarine weapon. The ships have two of these systems abeam to starboard and to port. They also have an Oto-Melara 62-caliber gun to be used against sea and air targets.

They are 137 m (449 ft 6 in) long and have a range of 8,000 nautical miles (15,000 km; 9,200 mi) at 14 knots (26 km/h; 16 mph) with a top speed of 30 knots (56 km/h; 35 mph). The ship can have up to 220 personnel on board and is also fitted to accommodate one aircraft. The ship's flight deck can be used to service a SH-60J9(K) Seahawk helicopter.

== Construction and career ==
Setogiri was laid down on 9 March 1987 and launched on 12 September 1988 by Hitachi Zosen Corporation, Maizuru. She was commissioned on 14 February 1990.

The destroyer was dispatched to the Great East Japan Earthquake off the Pacific coast of Tōhoku on 11 March 2011.

On 26 July 2013, she set sail off the coast of Somalia with the escort ship JS Ariake as the 16th dispatched anti-piracy action surface corps. She was engaged in missions until December of the same year and returned to Ōminato on 17 January 2014.

From 19 March to 27 April 2016, the ship participated in the open sea practice voyage (flying) with the escort ship Ariake and the training submarine JS Oyashio. At the same time, she is the first Maritime Self-Defense Force ship to call at Cam Ranh Bay, a strategic point in central and southern Vietnam.

At around 10:50 pm on 26 August 2017, the SH-60J patrol helicopter on board the ship lost communication during night training. Of the four crew members, one was rescued after the accident, but the remaining three, including the captain, were still missing. Following the search, an aircraft was found on the seabed at a depth of 2,600 m (8,500 ft) and after unloading the wreckage on 27 October, two missing persons were found. The search was completed without finding the remaining crew member. On 3 December 2017, Setogiri departed from Ōminato for the Gulf of Aden off the coast of Somalia as the 29th dispatched anti-piracy action surface unit and engaged in missions until April 2018. On 13–14 May while returning to Japan, she conducted joint training with the Indian Navy destroyer INS Ranjit and returned to Ōminato on 3 June.

== Gallery ==
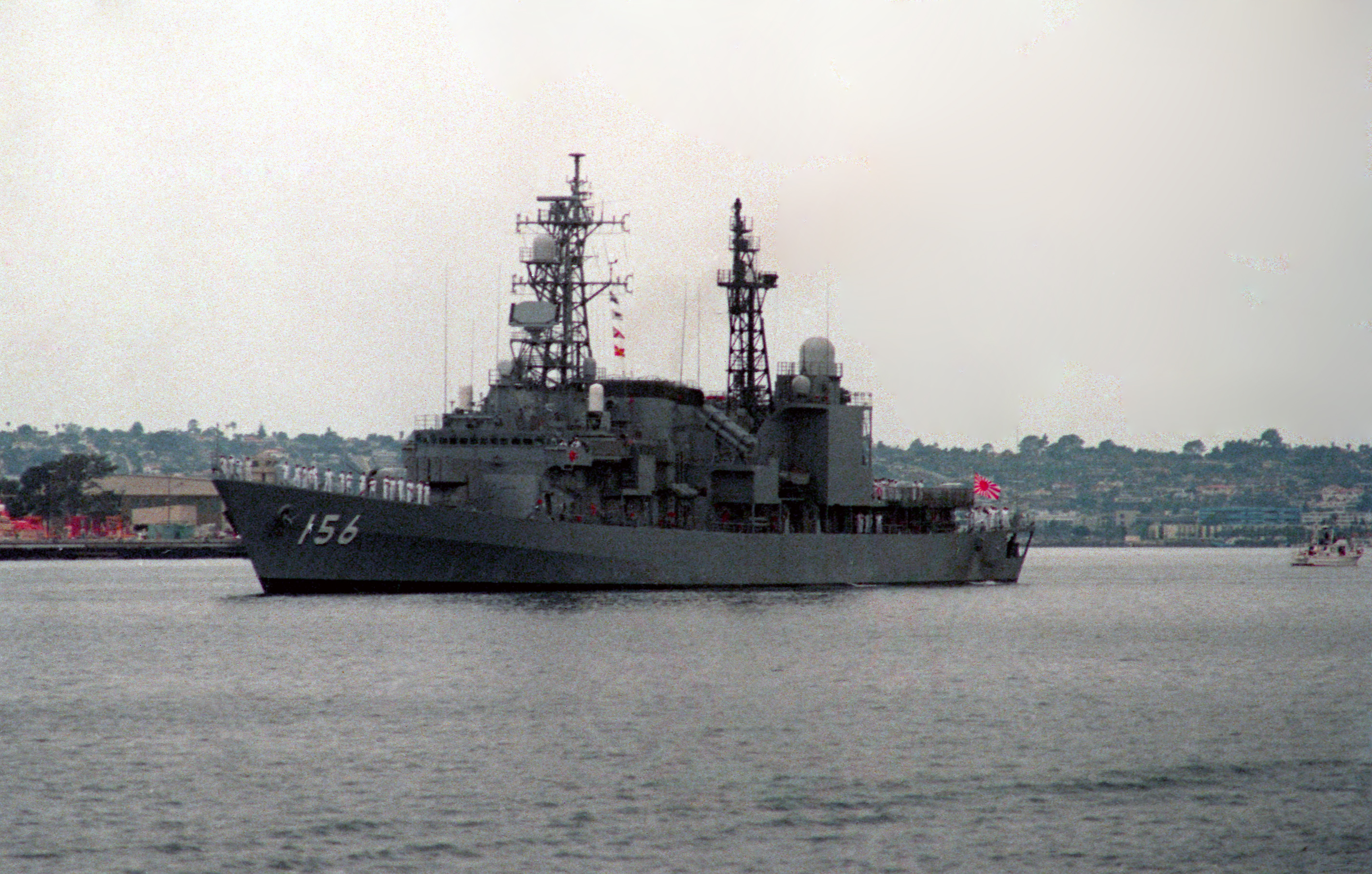
JS Setogiri at San Diego on 1 July 1991.

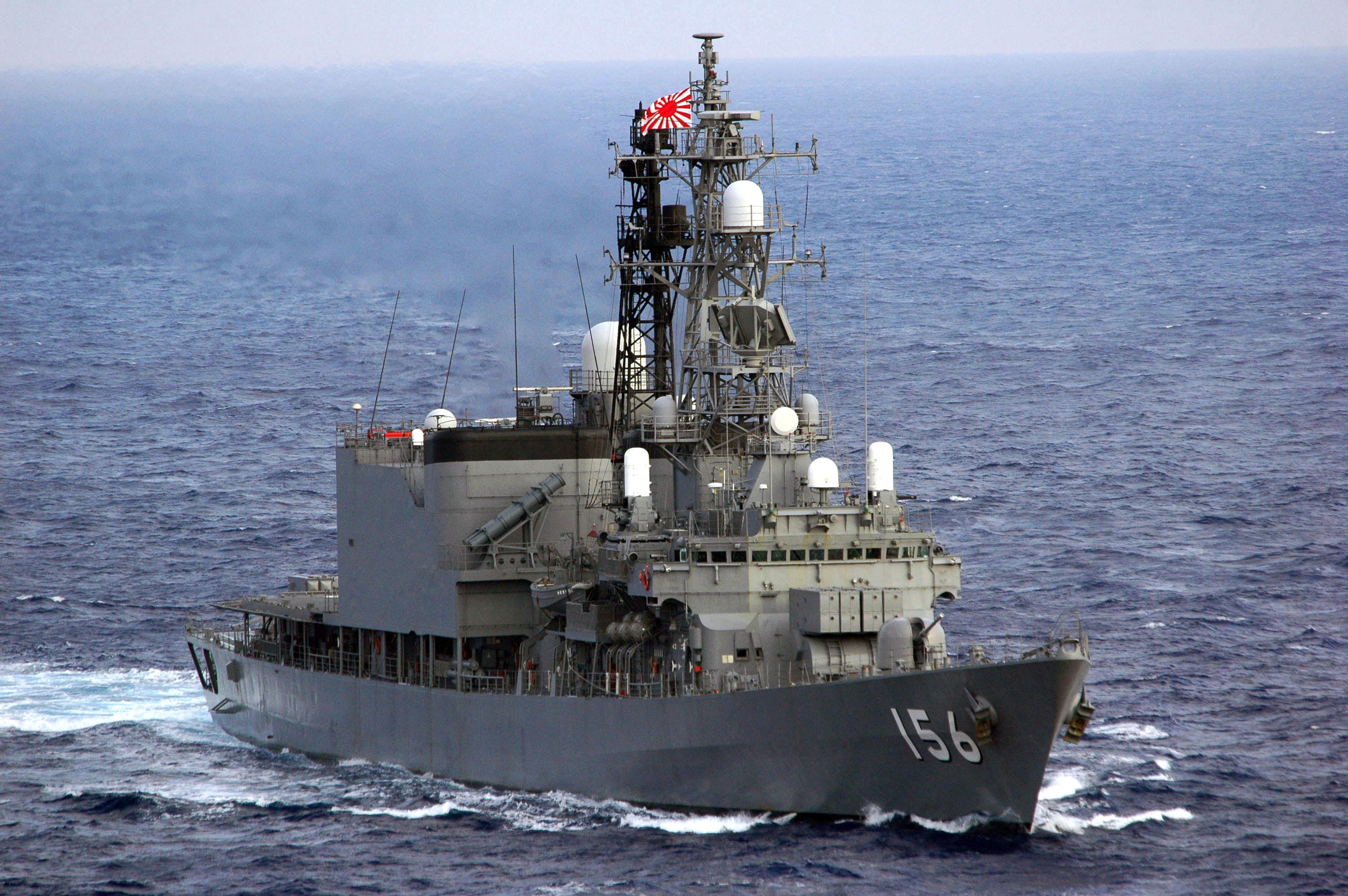
JS Setogiri during Keen Sword 08 on 16 November 2007

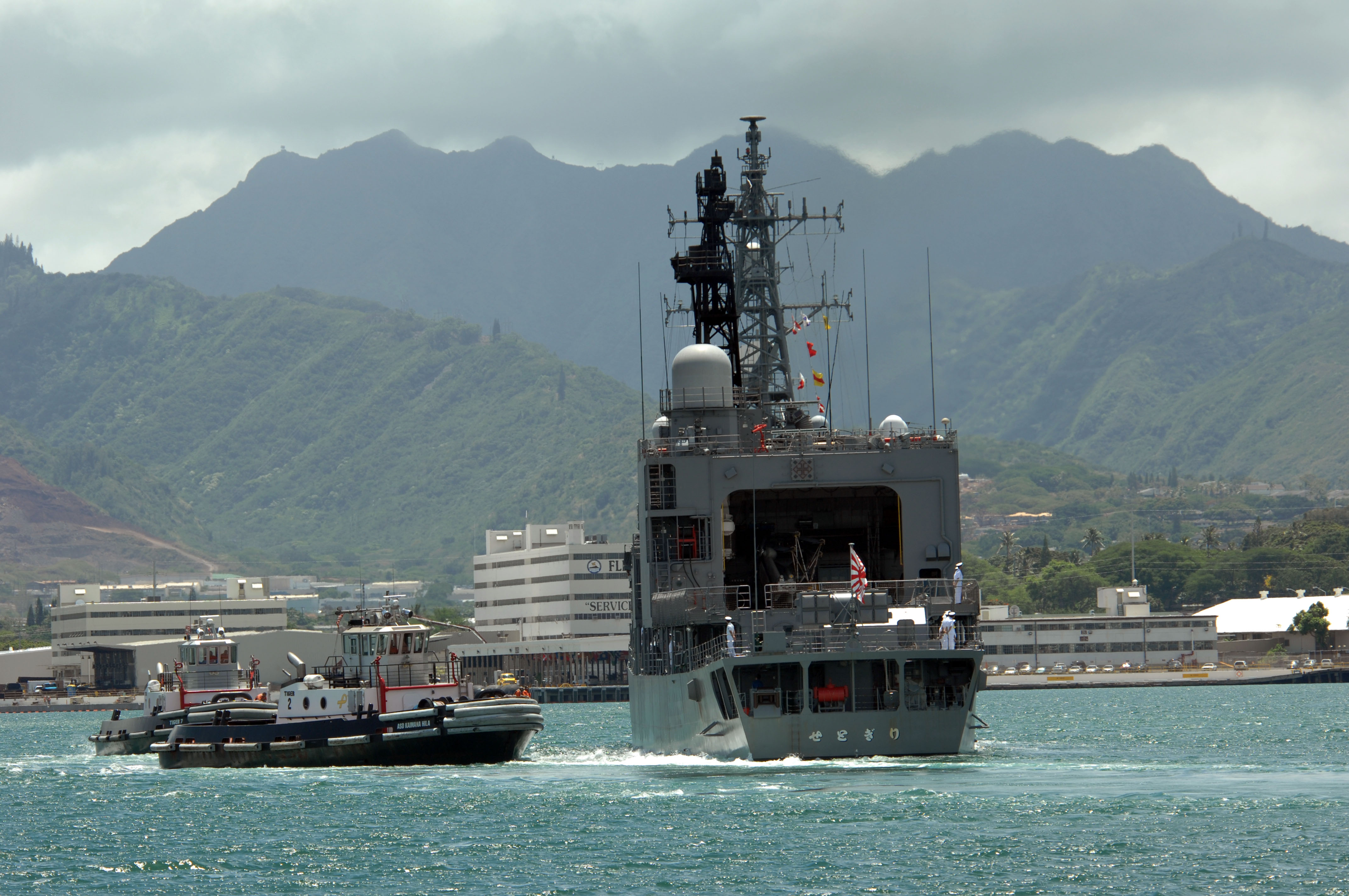
JS Setogiri at Pearl Harbor on 26 June 2008.

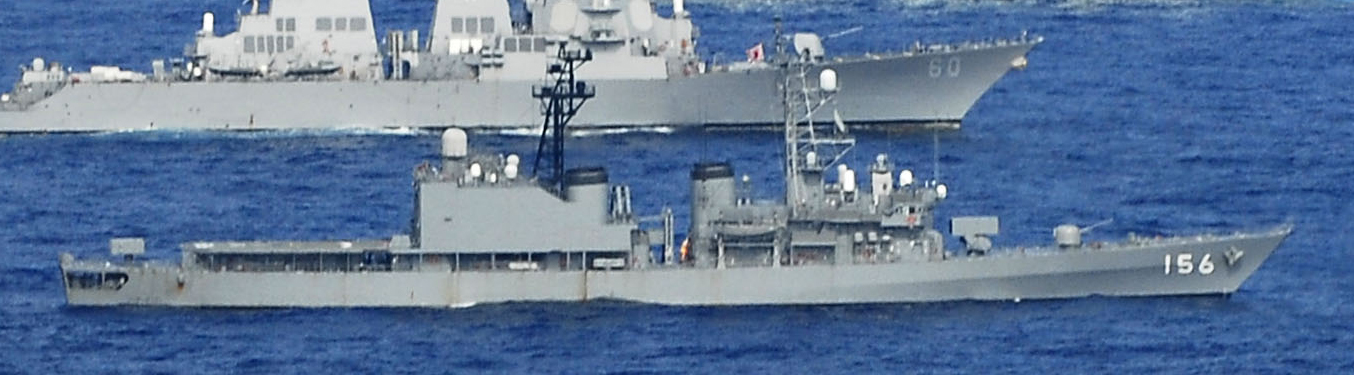
JS Setogiri during RIMPAC 2008.

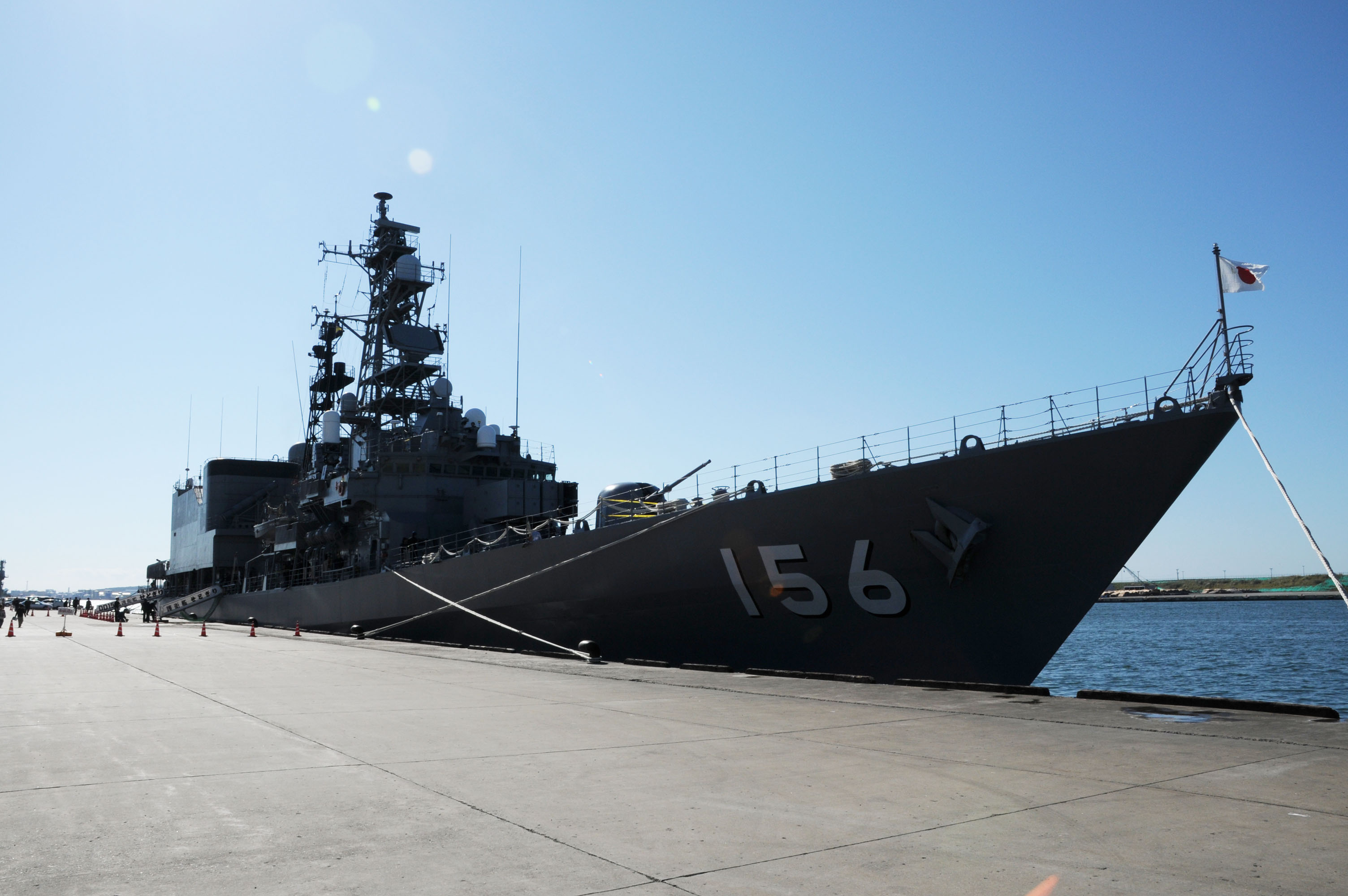
JS Setogiri at Akita on 13 October 2008.

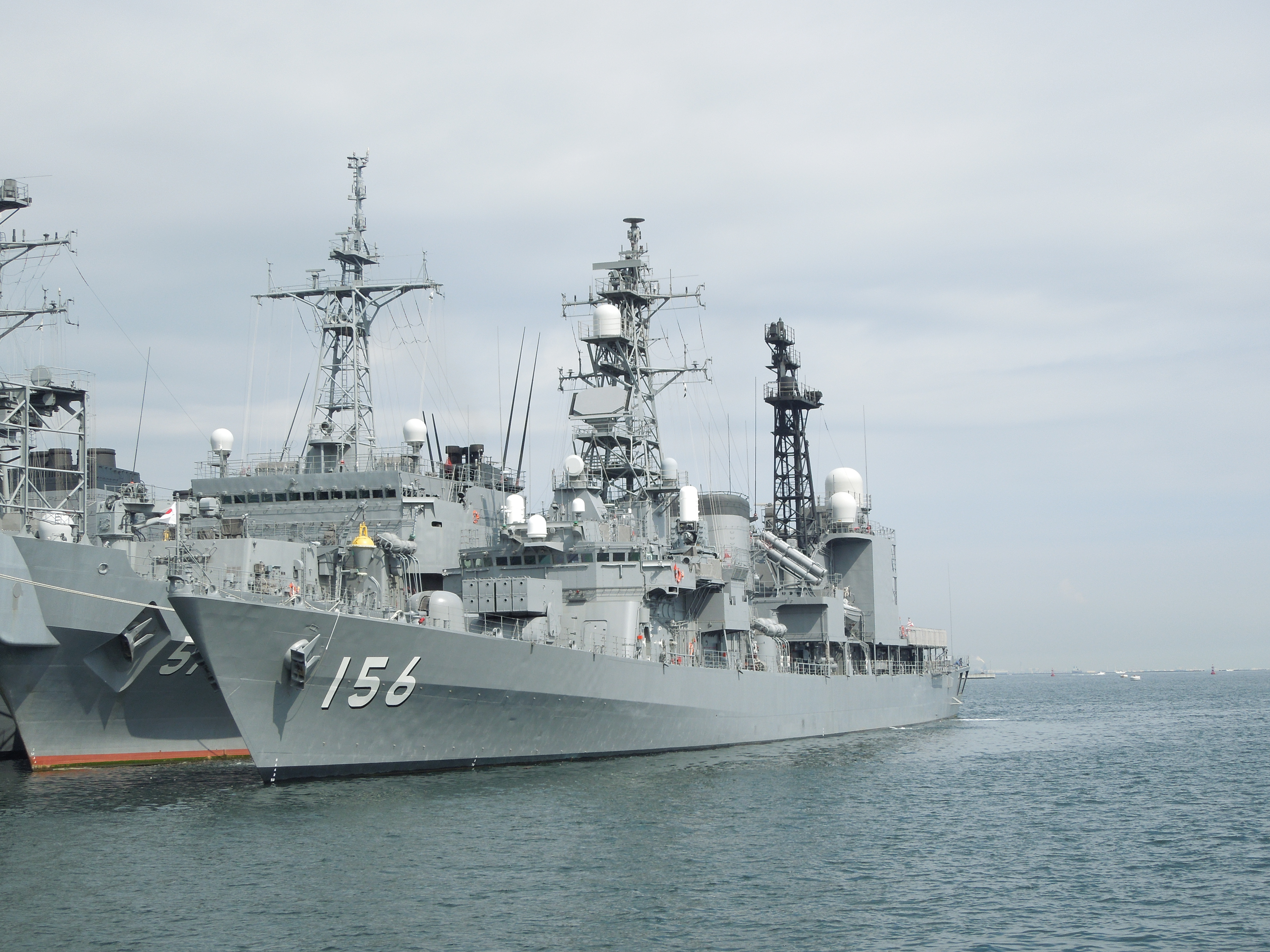
JS Setogiri on 24 September 2017.

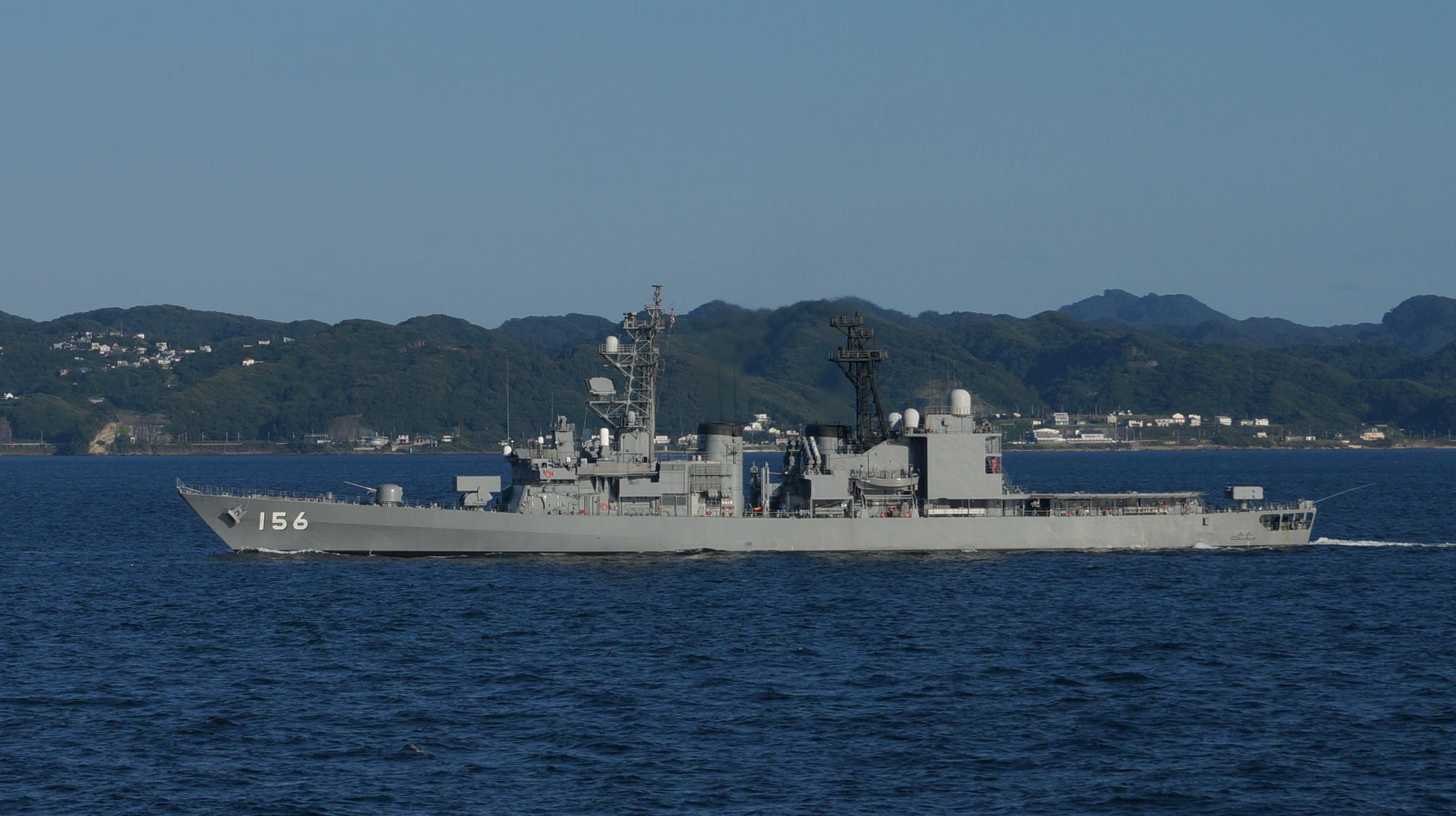
JS Setogiri in Tokyo Bay on 29 September 2017.

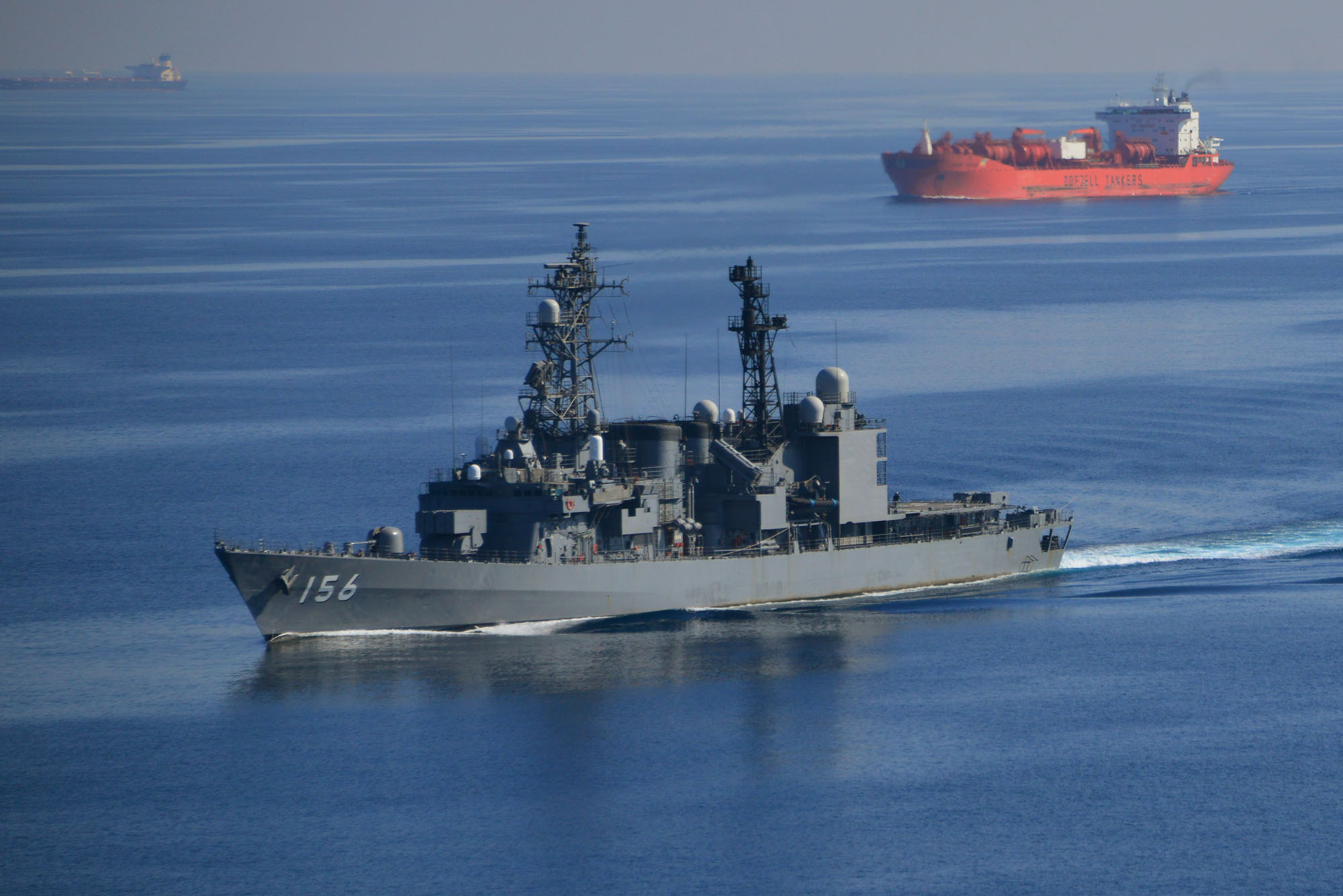
JS Setogiri on 23 February 2018.

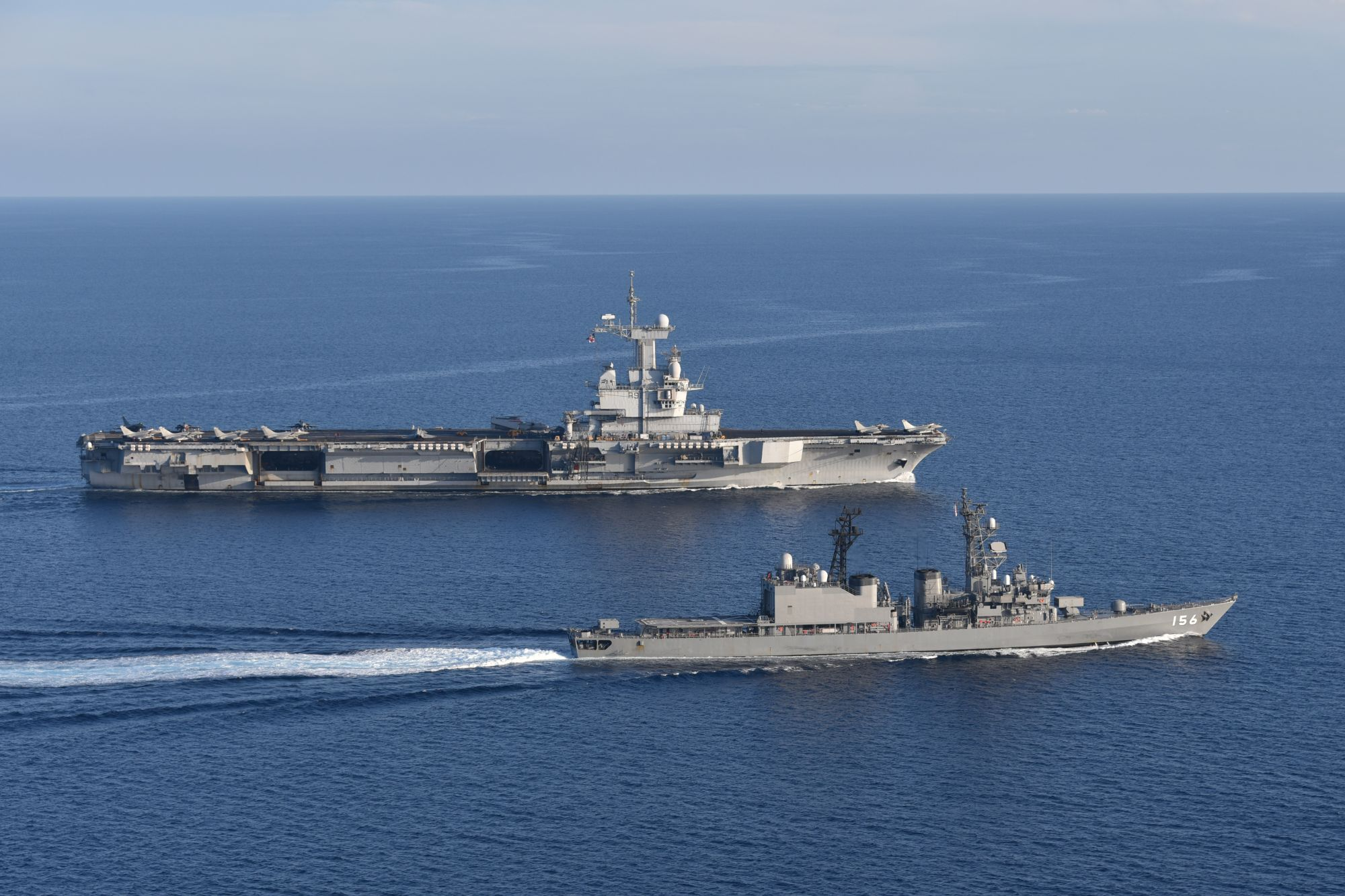
JS Setogiri and french aircraft carrier Charles de Gaulle, 1 May 2021.

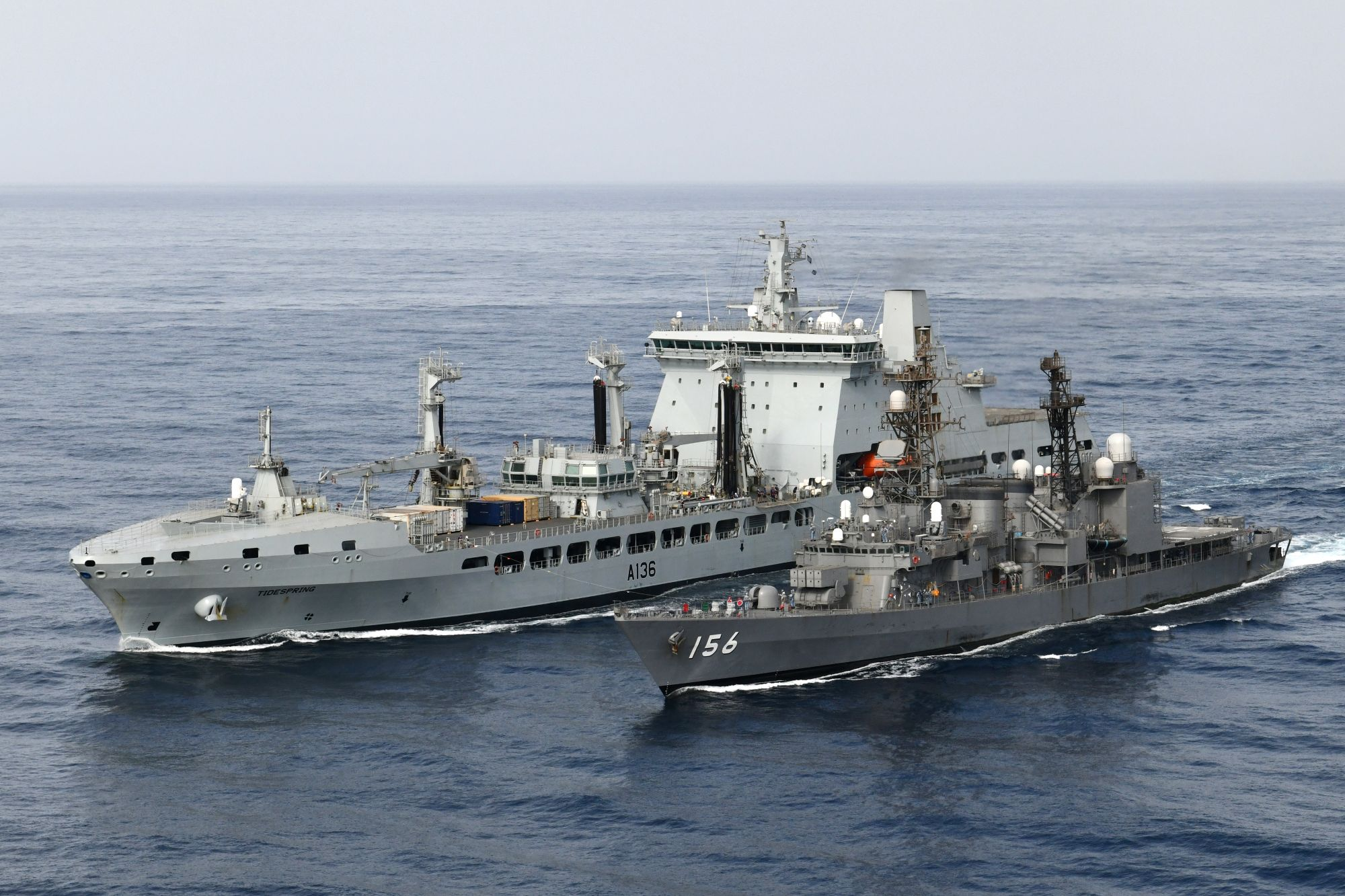
JS Setogiri and RFA Tidespring, 12 July 2021.

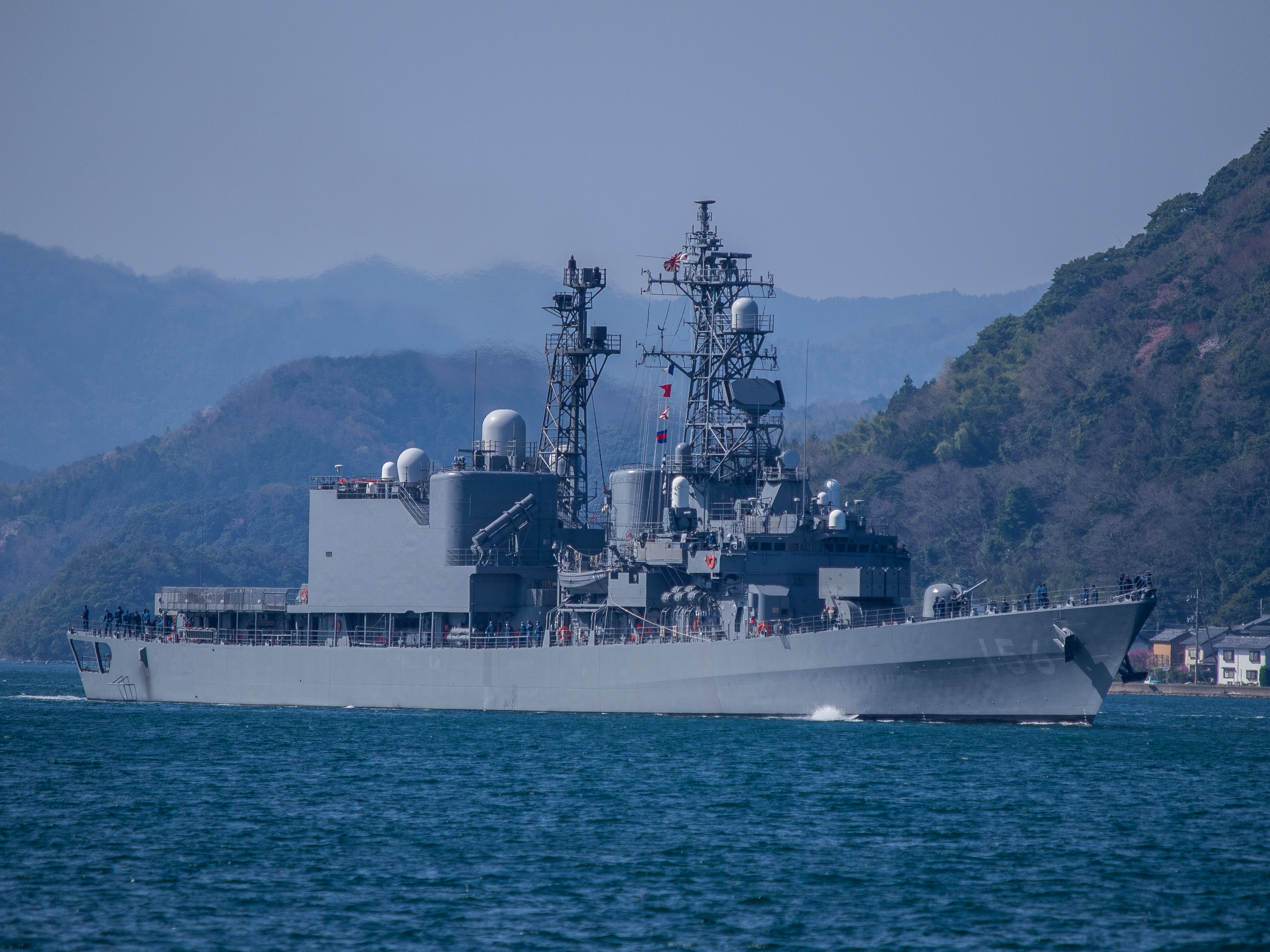
JS Setogiri on 9 April 2022.
