= USS Mingo (SS-261) =

Submarine of the United States

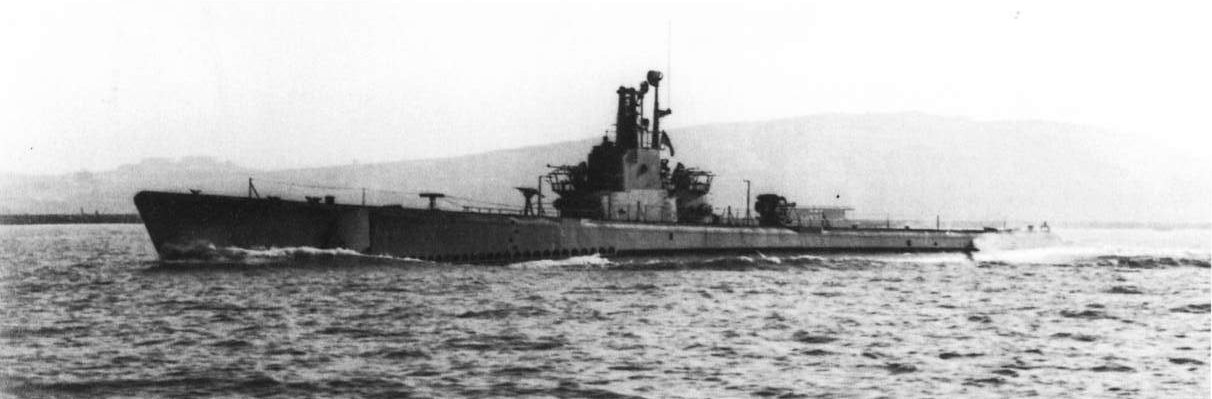
- Mingo off San Francisco, July 1945

History

United States
- Name: USS Mingo
- Builder: Electric Boat Company, Groton, Connecticut
- Laid down: 21 March 1942
- Launched: 30 November 1942
- Sponsored by: Mrs. Henry L. Pence
- Commissioned: 12 February 1943
- Decommissioned: January 1947
- Recommissioned: 20 May 1955
- Decommissioned: 15 August 1955
- Stricken: 20 February 1971
- Fate: Transferred to Japan unmodified, 15 August 1955

Japan
- Name: Kuroshio
- Acquired: 15 August 1955
- Decommissioned: 31 March 1966
- Fate: Returned to U.S. control, 31 March 1966; Sold to Japan 20 February 1971, Sunk as a target 1973

Class overview
- Preceded by: N/A
- Succeeded by: Oyashio class

General characteristics
- Class & type: Gato-class diesel-electric submarine
- Displacement: 1,525 long tons (1,549 t) (surfaced); 2,424 long tons (2,463 t) (submerged)
- Length: 311 ft 9 in (95.02 m)
- Beam: 27 ft 3 in (8.31 m)
- Draft: 17 ft (5.2 m) maximum
- Propulsion: 4 × Hooven-Owens-Rentschler (H.O.R.) diesel engines driving electrical generators; 2 × 126-cell Sargo batteries; 4 × high-speed Allis-Chalmers electric motors with reduction gears; two propellers; 5,400 shp (4.0 MW) surfaced; 2,740 shp (2.0 MW) submerged
- Speed: 21 kn (24 mph; 39 km/h); 9 kn (10 mph; 17 km/h) submerged
- Range: 11,000 nmi (13,000 mi; 20,000 km) at 10 kn (12 mph; 19 km/h) (surfaced)
- Endurance: 48 hours at 2 kn (2.3 mph; 3.7 km/h) submerged; 75 days on patrol
- Test depth: 300 ft (91 m)
- Complement: 6 officers, 54 enlisted
- Armament: 10 × 21-inch (533 mm) torpedo tubes; 6 forward, 4 aft; 24 torpedoes; 1 × 3-inch (76 mm) / 50 caliber deck gun; Bofors 40 mm and Oerlikon 20 mm cannon

USS Mingo (SS-261) — a Gato-class submarine — was the first ship of the United States Navy to be named for the mingo snapper.

== Construction and commissioning ==
Mingo′s keel was laid down by the Electric Boat Company at Groton, Connecticut. She was launched on 30 November 1942, sponsored by Mrs. Henry L. Pence, and commissioned on 12 February 1943.

== Operational history ==
After shakedown off Long Island, Mingo departed for Naval Station Newport at Newport, Rhode Island, on 1 April 1943 for three weeks of operations with the Naval Torpedo Station. She cleared Naval Submarine Base New London at New London, Connecticut on 16 May 1943 for the Pacific via the Panama Canal Zone.

=== First and second war patrols ===
After further training at Pearl Harbor, Hawaii, Mingo departed on her maiden war patrol on 25 June 1943. She made damaging attacks on three Japanese merchant ships and bombarded Sorol Island off the Palaus before returning to Pearl Harbor for refit.

Her second war patrol — from 29 September-20 November — took her to the Marshalls, Carolines, and Marianas. Her torpedoes damaged a Japanese cruiser. She departed the Hawaiian Islands for overhaul at Mare Island Navy Yard, San Pablo Bay, California. It is likely that her Hooven-Owens-Rentschler diesels were replaced with Fairbanks-Morse Model 38D8 1/8 opposed piston engines during this overhaul. The submarine left the West Coast on 3 February 1944 for continued operations in the Pacific.

=== Third and fourth war patrols ===
For her third war patrol, Mingo joined the US 7th Fleet in patrolling the South China Sea. She then sailed for Brisbane, Australia, via the Bismarck Sea and Milne Bay, New Guinea, arriving on 9 May. She continued on to Manus, Admiralty Islands on 10 June for further training.

Mingo left Manus for the Philippines on 18 June on her fourth war patrol. On 7 July, she attacked a Japanese high-speed convoy off Luzon and sank the destroyer Tamanami. The submarine put into Fremantle, Australia on 30 July.

=== Fifth and sixth war patrols ===
Mingo began her fifth war patrol on 27 August 1944. Although her primary operation was lifeguard duty in support of the US Thirteenth Air Force strikes on the Philippines and Borneo, she sank four coastal freighters. Mingo did a noteworthy job as lifeguard as she rescued 16 B-24 Liberator fliers shot down off Balikpapan, Borneo; six of them from rubber boats in Makassar Strait and the other 10 from the beach of Celebes Island. On 4 October, a U.S. Navy PB4Y-1 Liberator patrol bomber mistakenly attacked her, dropping a 100-pound (45 kg) bomb which landed 100 yards (91 m) from Mingo, inflicting no damage or casualties. She moored in Fremantle on 13 October.

Her sixth war patrol, mostly reconnaissance duty, took place west of Borneo. On 25 November, Mingo made a night torpedo attack on a Japanese convoy on a run between Singapore and Brunei, Borneo. Beside damaging an escort gunboat, she sank loaded 9,486-ton tanker Manila Maru. The sinking of a maru of that name was prophetic, for the Japanese were only three months away from losing their hold completely on the ship's namesake, the Philippine capital. After assisting two other submarines in successful attacks, she returned to Fremantle on 29 December for repairs.

=== Seventh war patrol ===
Mingo took station at the South China Sea again for her seventh and last war patrol from 6 February–10 April 1945. On 14 February, she sailed to Fremantle to repair damage caused by a hurricane in which she had lost two men on 10 February. She departed on 19 February for further patrol off the Gulf of Siam before arriving in the Marianas on 10 April.

En route to Hawaii on 14 August, Mingo received word of the end of hostilities. After a short stay at Pearl Harbor, she sailed for the West Coast.

=== Japanese service, 1955–1966 ===
On 1 January 1947 Mingo decommissioned at Mare Island and entered the Pacific Reserve Fleet. Recommissioned on 20 May 1955. Mingo was transferred on loan to Japan under the Military Assistance Program and renamed Kuroshio (SS-501) on 15 August. Her initial role was as an underwater training target for surface vessels. She continued to serve the Japan Maritime Self-Defense Force as Kuroshio until decommissioned on 31 March 1966. She was sunk as a target in 1973.

== Awards ==
Mingo received five battle stars for World War II service. Five of her seven war patrols were designated "successful".

== Bibliography ==
- Wright, C. C. (2005). "Question 17/03: Replacement of US Submarine Diesel Engines". Warship International. XLII (4): 431–434. ISSN 0043-0374.
- Hinman, Charles R., and Douglas E. Campbell. The Submarine Has No Friends: Friendly Fire Incidents Involving U.S. Submarines During World War II. Syneca Research Group, Inc., 2019. ISBN 978-0-359-76906-3.
