= JDS Hayashio (SS-521) =

Hayashio-class submarines

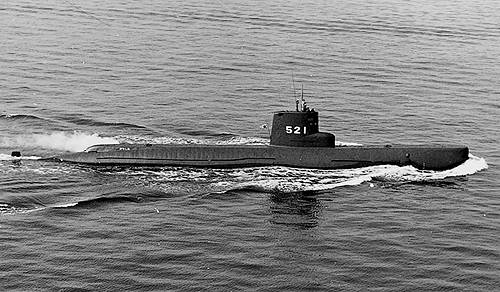
- JDS Hayashio

History

Japan
- Name: Hayashio; (はやしお)
- Namesake: Hayashio (1939)
- Ordered: 1959
- Builder: Mitsubishi, Kobe
- Laid down: 6 June 1960
- Launched: 31 July 1961
- Commissioned: 30 June 1962
- Decommissioned: 25 July 1977
- Home port: Kure
- Identification: Pennant number: SS-521
- Fate: Scrapped, November 1977

General characteristics
- Class & type: Hayashio-class submarine
- Displacement: 750 long tons (762 t) (surfaced); 800 long tons (813 t) (submerged)
- Length: 59 m (193 ft 7 in)
- Beam: 6.5 m (21 ft 4 in)
- Draft: 4.1 m (13 ft 5 in)
- Depth: 6.4 m (21 ft 0 in)
- Propulsion: Diesel-electric, 2 shafts; 900 BHP (surfaced); 2,300 SHP (submerged)
- Speed: 11 knots (20 km/h; 13 mph) surfaced; 14 knots (26 km/h; 16 mph) submerged
- Complement: 40
- Armament: 3 × 533 mm (21 in) torpedo tubes

JDS Hayashio (SS-521) was the lead boat of the Hayashio-class submarines. She was commissioned on 30 June 1962.

== Construction and career ==
Hayashio was laid down at Mitsubishi Heavy Industries Kobe Shipyard on 6 June 1960 and launched on 31 July 1961. She was commissioned on 30 June 1962.

On 1 August 1962, the 1st Submarine Corps was newly formed and incorporated under the Kure District Force.

On 1 March 1963, the 1st Submarine was reorganized under the Self-Defense Fleet.

From 2 June to 19 August 1964, she participated in Hawaii dispatch training with JDS Wakashio.

On 1 February 1965, the 1st Submarine was reorganized into the 1st Submarine Group, which was newly formed under the Self-Defense Fleet.

At around 6:40 pm on 20 May 1970, she came into contact with a large merchant ship during a dive training in a water area about 30 km east of Tanegashima, Kagoshima Prefecture, and damaged her periscope.

She was decommissioned on 25 July 1977 and dismantled at Furusawa Steel in Etajima-cho in November 1977.
