= JDS Oyashio =

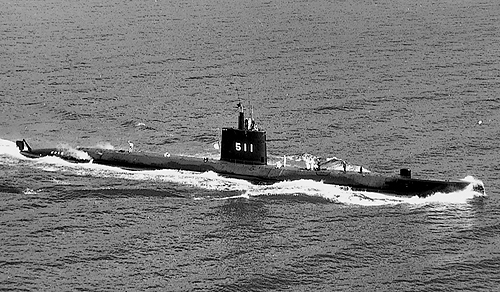
- JDS Oyashio

History

Japan
- Name: Oyashio; (おやしお)
- Namesake: Oyashio (1938)
- Ordered: 1956
- Builder: Kawasaki, Kobe
- Laid down: 25 December 1957
- Launched: 25 May 1959
- Commissioned: 30 June 1960
- Decommissioned: 30 September 1976
- Home port: Kure
- Fate: Scrapped, March 1977

Class overview
- Preceded by: Kuroshio class
- Succeeded by: Hayashio class

General characteristics
- Type: Submarine
- Displacement: 1,139 long tons (1,157 t) surfaced; 1,420 long tons (1,443 t) submerged
- Length: 78.8 m (258 ft 6 in)
- Beam: 7 m (23 ft 0 in)
- Draught: 4.6 m (15 ft 1 in)
- Propulsion: 2 × Kawasaki V8V22/30MATL diesel-electric, 2,700 bhp (2,013 kW) surfaced, 5,960 shp (4,444 kW) submerged
- Speed: 19 knots (35 km/h; 22 mph) submerged; 13 knots (24 km/h; 15 mph) surfaced
- Range: 10,000 nmi (19,000 km)
- Complement: 65
- Armament: 4× 533 mm (21 in) Bow torpedo tubes

JDS Oyashio (SS-511) was a submarine of the Japan Maritime Self-Defense Force, named after the Oyashio Current, a cold current that comes down through the Bering Strait.

== Development ==
The Maritime Self-Defense Force did not own a submarine at the time of its inauguration, but in January 1955, it was announced that a submarine would be rented as an addition to the Japan-US Ship Lending Agreement signed in May 1954. As a result, the Gato-class submarine USS Mingo was lent and recommissioned as JDS Kuroshio. The ship was a conventional ship type mainly for surface navigation, and although it was inferior to the underwater high-speed submarines that appeared at the end of World War II, it played a very important role as the beginning of submarine force development.

However, on the other hand, based on the achievements of the Imperial Japanese Navy, which built and operated more than 200 submarines before the war, the Japanese side began to aim for domestic production of submarines from around the beginning of 1954. At this time, aiming for an underwater speed of 20 knots, three types of 250 ton type, 500 ton type, and 1,000 ton type were examined, but since it was the first domestic ship after the war, ease of construction was prioritized and the 1000 ton type was selected. Following selection, development proceeded by taking into account the achievements of Kuroshio and the reports of the US inspection team, and finally the size was increased to 1,100 tons.

== Design ==
Having had a vast submarine fleet before and during World War II, the Japanese had built no subs for over ten years, so JDS Oyashio was based on the wartime Imperial Japanese Navy I-201 with some US innovations. However, as for the hull structure, while I-201 adopted the internal rib type, the ship was a saddle tank type semi-double shell type with only the bottom of the ship as a single shell type. SM52 high-strength steel (yield strength 30 kgf / mm2) was used for the pressure hull, and it was constructed by welding. The upper deck is covered with teak wood in a slatted shape, which is the only example of the JMSDF submarine adopting a wooden deck.

The main engine system was a diesel-electric system modeled after Kuroshio. A snorkel was planned to be installed on this ship, but since the operation record in the former Navy was short and it was not equipped in Kuroshio, careful consideration was given to the diesel engine. First, aptitude studies were conducted, including when combined with a snorkel, by comparing Kawasaki Heavy Industries' 4-stroke engines, Shin-Mitsubishi Heavy Industries' 4-stroke and 2-stroke engines, and Mitsui Zosen's 2-stroke engines. As a result, the Kawasaki MAN V8 V200 / is a 4-stroke V-type 16-cylinder engine because it has the ability to extrude exhaust gas, has little performance degradation at high exhaust pressure, and has a low fuel consumption rate and combustion air consumption rate. A 30mAL medium-speed diesel engine (850 rpm, water 1,350 horsepower / snorkel operation 1,250 horsepower) was selected. It was also equipped with a turbocharger that was mechanically driven from the crankshaft to avoid operation at high exhaust pressure and low intake pressure.

== Service history ==
Oyashio was laid down on 25 December 1957 and launched on 25 May 1959 by Kawasaki Heavy Industries Kobe Shipyard. She was commissioned on 30 June 1960.

On 1 August 1962 Oyashio was assigned to Subron 1, Kure district.

From June to August 1963 she visited Pearl Harbor.

Assigned to Subron 2, Submarine Flotilla 1 together with JDS Kuroshio on 1 February 1965.

Assigned to Submarine Flotilla 1 on 31 March 1975.

Oyashio was finally decommissioned on 30 September 1976. Currently, her anchor and screw propeller are stored and exhibited at the Kota Town Folk Museum in Kota Town, Aichi Prefecture.

== Gallery ==
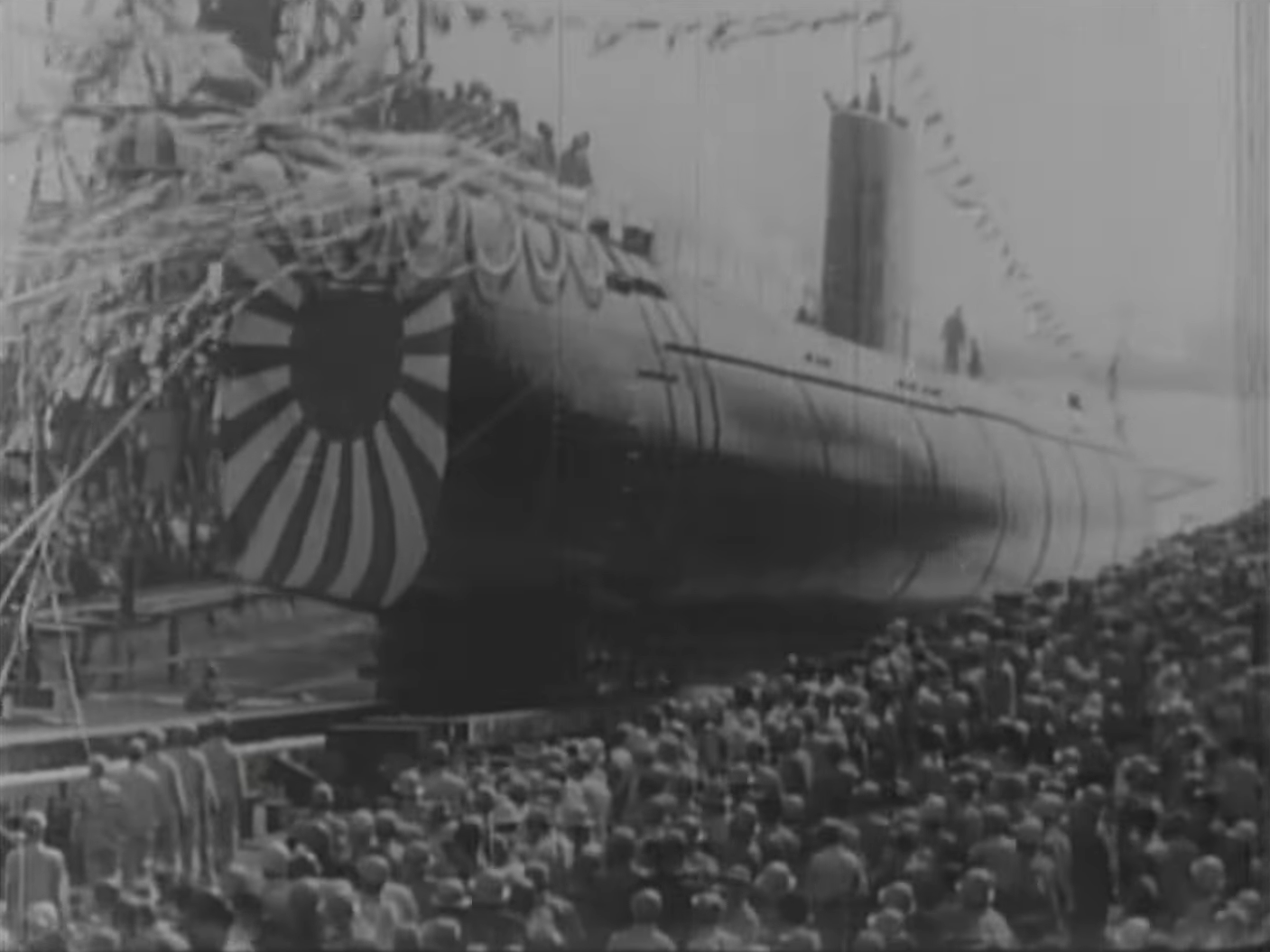
Launching of JDS Oyashio on 25 May 1959

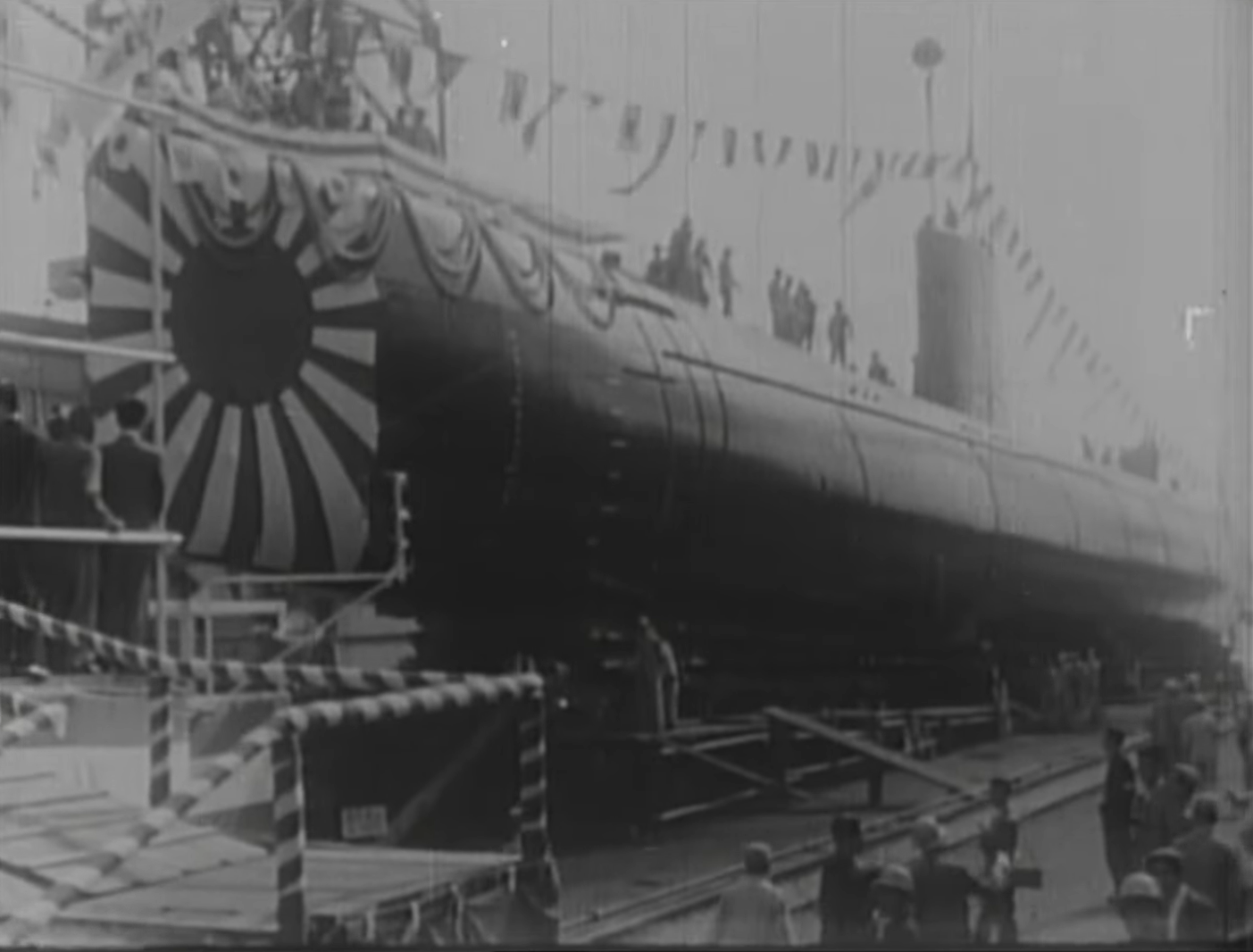

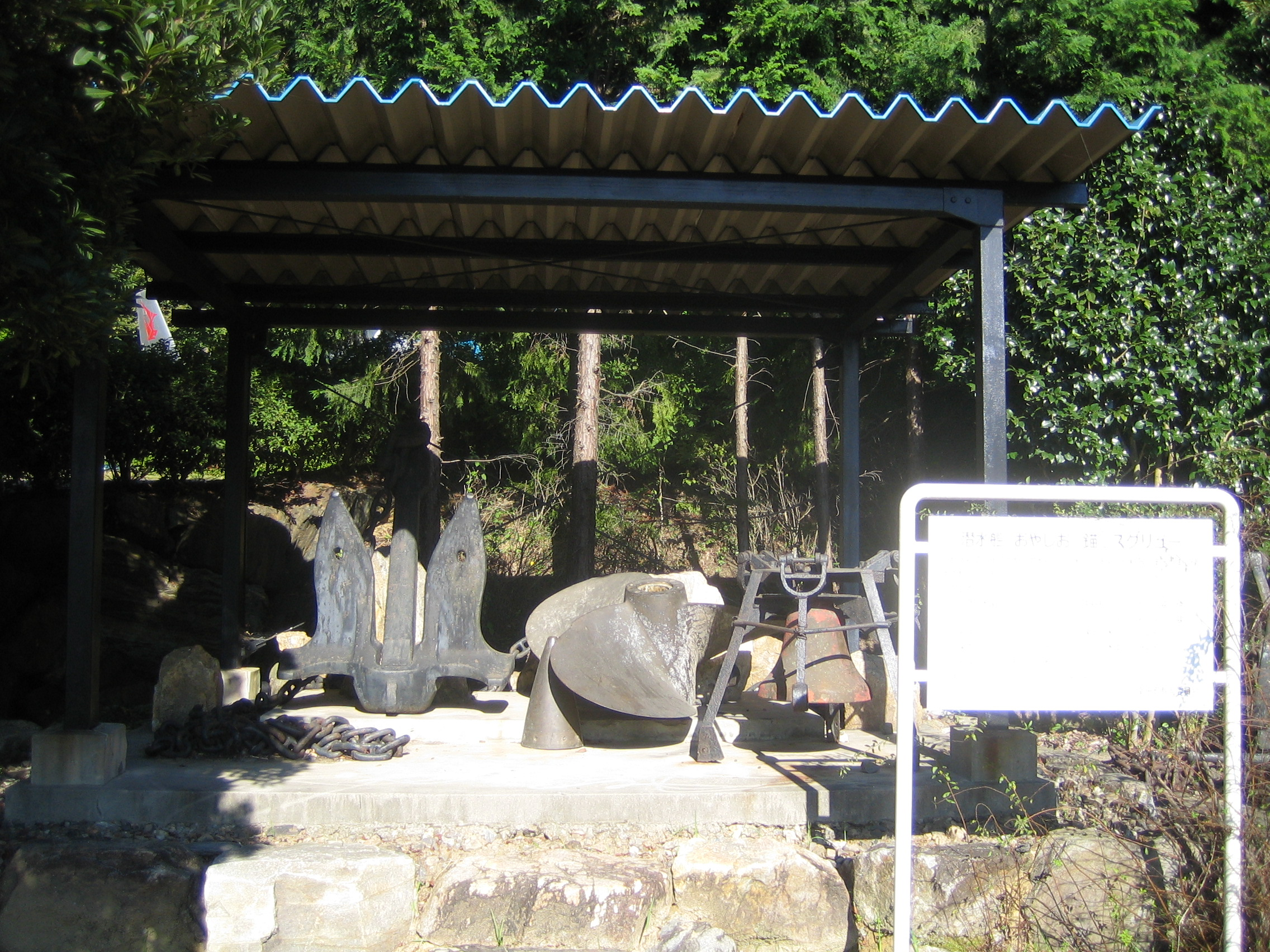
Anchor and propeller of JDS Oyashio

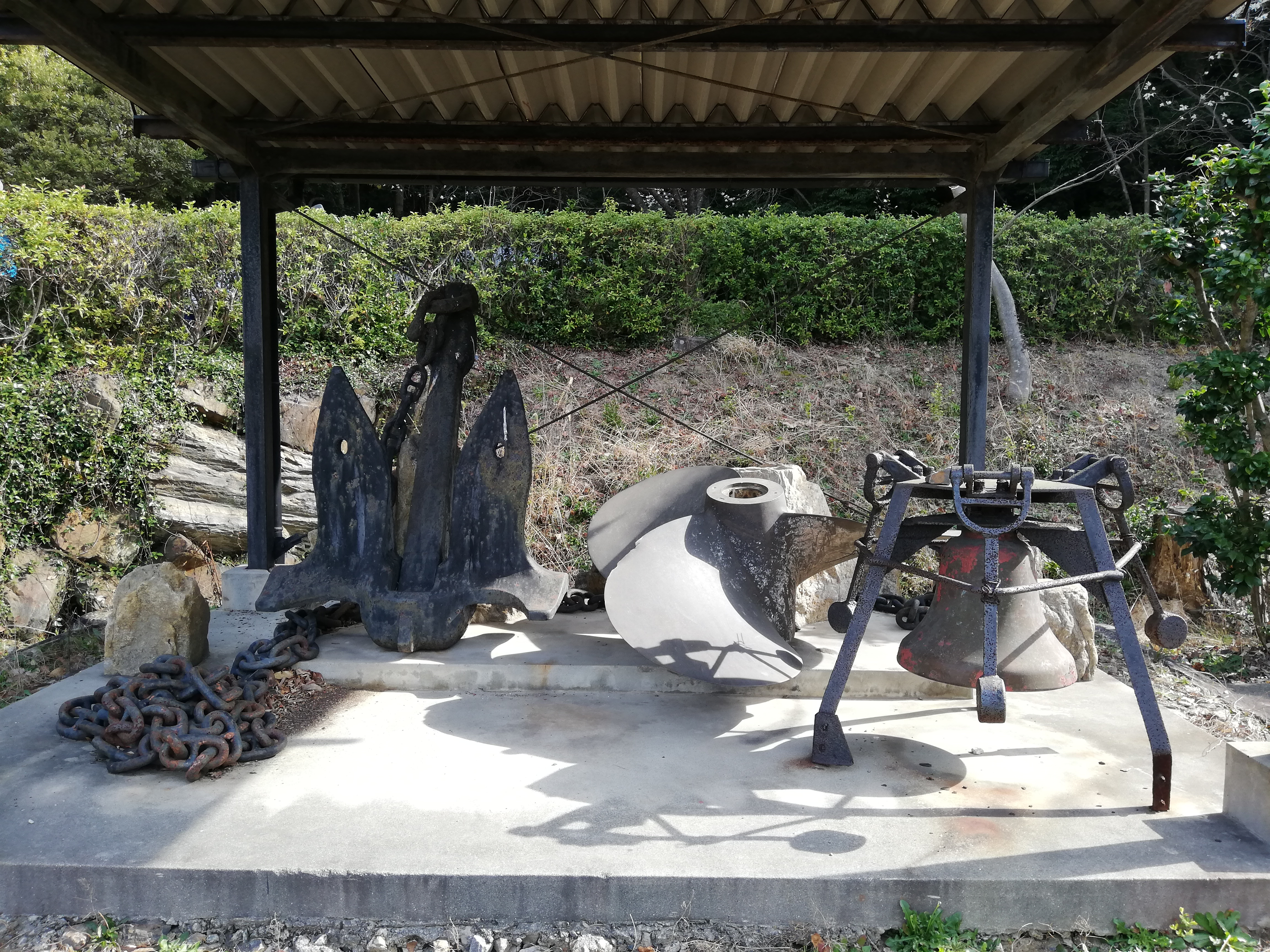

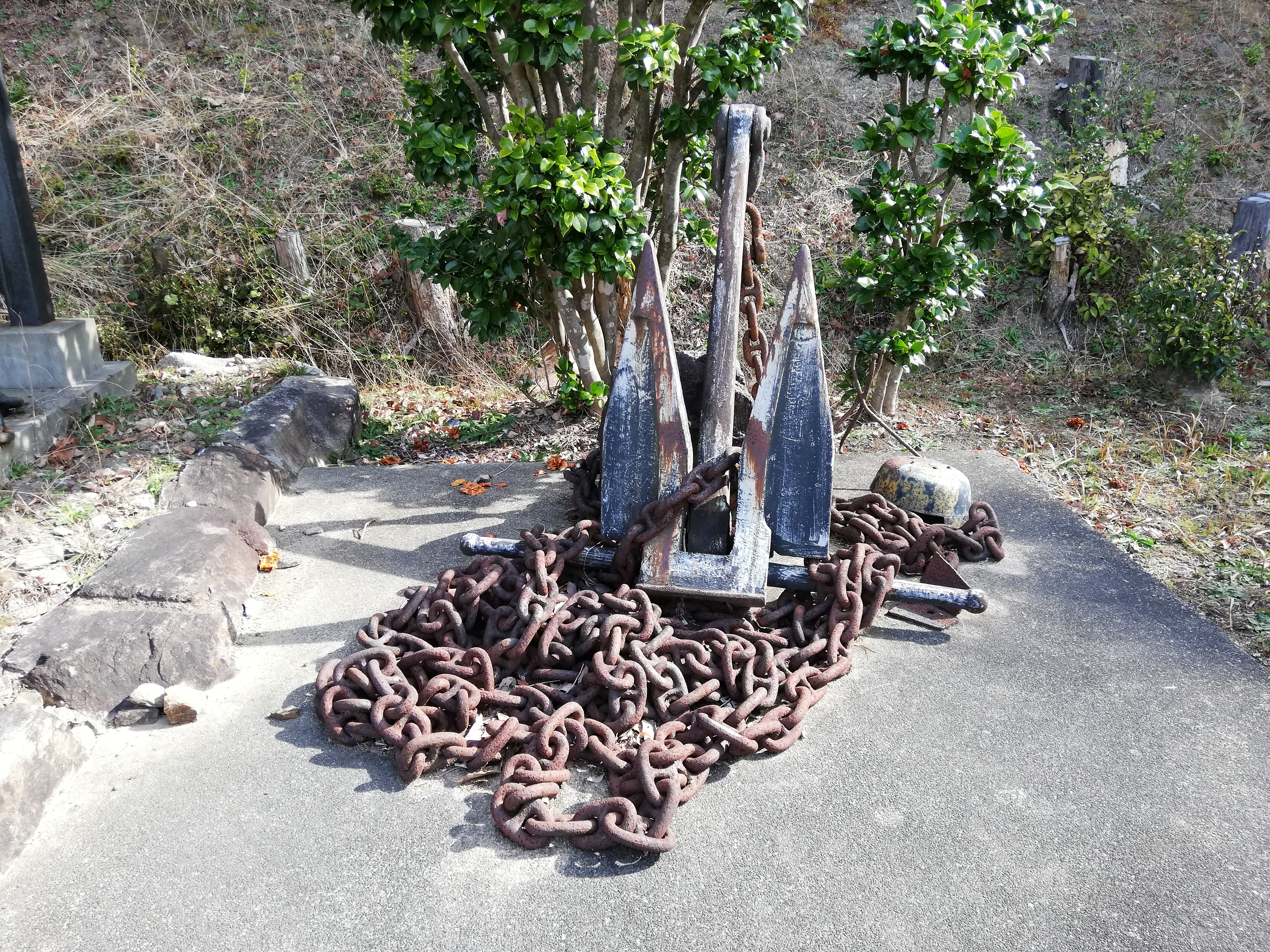

== See also ==
- Oyashio Current
