= JS Oyashio =

Oyashio-class submarines

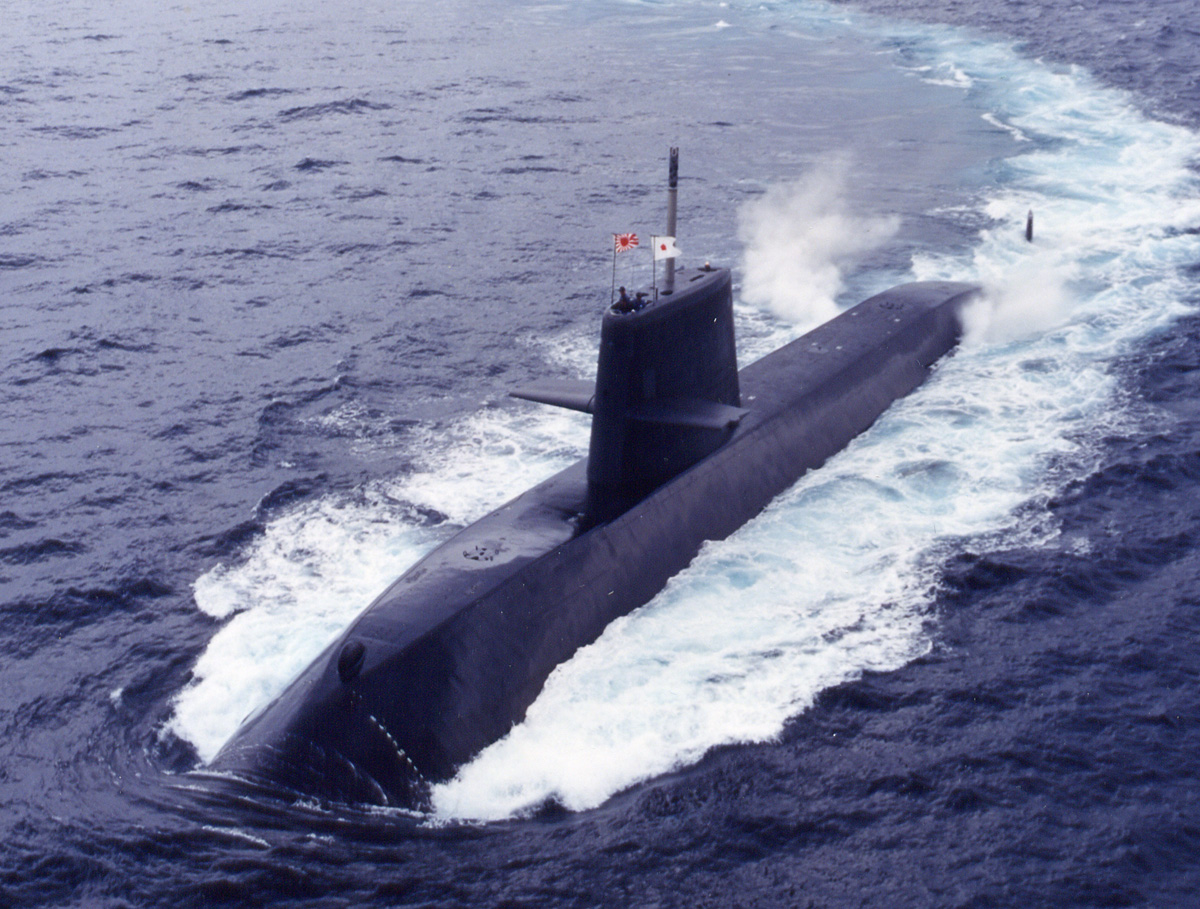
- JS Oyashio

History

Japan
- Name: Oyashio; (おやしお)
- Namesake: Oyashio
- Ordered: 1993
- Builder: Kawasaki, Kobe
- Cost: ¥52.19 million
- Laid down: 26 January 1994
- Launched: 15 October 1996
- Commissioned: 16 March 1998
- Decommissioned: 17 March 2023
- Reclassified: TSS-3608, 6 March 2015
- Home port: Kure, Hiroshima
- Identification: Pennant number: TSS-3608
- Status: Decommissioned

General characteristics
- Class & type: Oyashio-class submarine
- Displacement: 2,750 tonnes (surfaced); 4,000 tonnes (submerged)
- Length: 81.7 m (268 ft 1 in)
- Beam: 8.9 m (29 ft 2 in)
- Draught: 7.4 m (24 ft 3 in)
- Propulsion: Diesel-electric; 2 Kawasaki 12V25S diesel engines; 2 Kawasaki alternators; 2 Toshiba motors; 3,400 hp (2,500 kW) surfaced; 7,750 hp (5,780 kW) submerged
- Speed: 12 knots (22 km/h; 14 mph) (surfaced); 20 knots (37 km/h; 23 mph) (submerged)
- Complement: 70 (10 officers)
- Sensors & processing systems: Sonar: Hughes/Oki ZQQ-6 hull-mounted sonar, flank arrays, 1 towed array; Radar: JRC ZPS 6 I-band search radar.
- Armament: 6 × HU-605 21 in (533 mm) torpedo tubes with 20 reloads for: 1.) Type 89 torpedo; 2.) UGM-84 Harpoon

JS Oyashio (hull number SS-590) was the lead boat of the Oyashio-class submarines. She was commissioned on 16 March 1998, serving 25 years with the Japan Maritime Self-Defense Force before by the time of her decommissioning on 17 March 2023.

Oyashio, tied with JS Uzushio (SS-592), has the longest service career of any Japanese submarine commissioned since the JMSDF began building and commissionng submarines in the early 1960s.

== Construction and career ==
Oyashio was laid down at Kawasaki Heavy Industries Kobe Shipyard on 26 January 1994 and launched on 15 October 1996. She was commissioned on 16 March 1998 and deployed to Yokosuka.

From 11 January to 10 April 2006, she participated in RIMPAC 2006.

On 10 January 2009, during a performance test 4.6 kilometres (2.9 mi) Southwest of the Maritime Self-Defense Force Kagoshima Laboratory in Kirishima City, Kagoshima Prefecture, the Maritime Self-Defense Force's fishing boat 28th Kamemaru came into contact with the mast. A part of the stern of the fishing boat was damaged and dropped, but no one was injured. The fishing boat was chartered by the Maritime Self-Defense Force and was wary of other vessels from approaching during the performance test of Oyashio.

On 8 December 2009, the Kagoshima Maritime Security Department sent documents to the Captain and three others on suspicion of the risk of a possible traffic incident. Furthermore, at around 0:15 pm on 17 June 2009, during training on the Pacific Ocean about 28 kilometres (17 mi) East of Shiriyazaki, a cable for resource exploration (4.8 km) towed by the Agency for Natural Resources and Energy research vessel Shigen (10,395 tons) of the Ministry of Economy, Trade and Industry caused an incident that left some of the crew injured.

On 6 March 2015, due to the removal of the training submarine Fuyushio, Oyashio's designation was changed to a training submarine on the same date, and the first training submarine under the direct control of the submarine fleet. After joining the corps, the submarine's fixed port was transferred to Kure.

From 19 March to 27 April 2016, she participated in the open sea practice voyage (flight) with the escort vessels JS Ariake and JS Setogiri. On 3 April, she entered Subic Bay on Luzon Island, Philippines, facing the South China Sea.

At around 6:20 a.m. on 10 March 2022, while drifting at sea about 1.1 kilometers South-Southeast of the Kobe Wadamisaki Breakwater Lighthouse in Hyogo Ward, Kobe City, Oyashio collided with the fishing trawler Sumiyoshi Maru, which was sailing underway. There was no significant damage to either vessel, and no injuries.

Oyashio was decommissioned on 17 March 2023 at Kure. She had been in service for 25 years, the longest period attained by any MSDF submarine, and she had travelled 500,000 kilometres (310,000 miles) in distance.
