= Hayashio-class submarine =

Japanese naval class (1962–1979)

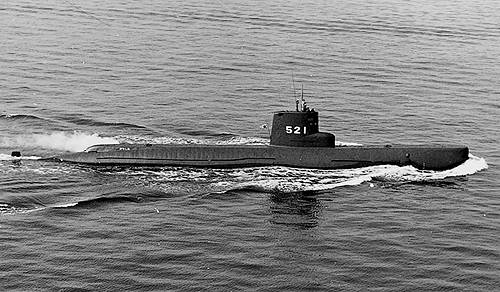
- JDS Hayashio

Class overview
- Name: Hayashio class
- Builders: New Mitsubishi Heavy Industries, Kawasaki Shipbuilding Corporation
- Operators: Japan Maritime Self-Defense Force
- Preceded by: Oyashio
- Succeeded by: Natsushio class
- Built: 1960–1962
- In commission: 1962–1979
- Planned: 2
- Completed: 2
- Retired: 2

General characteristics
- Type: (Hunter-killer) submarine
- Displacement: 650 tonnes (640 long tons) (surfaced); 800 tonnes (790 long tons) (submerged)
- Length: 59 m (193 ft 7 in)
- Beam: 6.5 m (21 ft 4 in)
- Draft: 4.1 m (13 ft 5 in)
- Propulsion: Sulzer-Mitsubishi Diesel-electric, 2 shafts; 1,300 kW (1,700 bhp) (surfaced); 1,700 kW (2,300 shp) (submerged)
- Speed: 11 knots (20 km/h; 13 mph) surfaced; 14 knots (26 km/h; 16 mph) submerged
- Complement: 43
- Armament: 3 × 533 mm (21 in) torpedo tubes

The Hayashio-class submarine was the successor to the Oyashio, and the predecessor of the Natsushio class within the Japan Maritime Self-Defense Force. Ordered in 1959, the boats were small with limited capabilities but were successful. Constructed in Japan from 1960 to 1962, they remained in service until 1979 when they were decommissioned.

== Design and description ==
The Hayashio class was based on the United States Navy Barracuda-class submarines. They were small with limited capability and were shorter and wider than the preceding Japanese Oyashio. The main mission of the class was for operations in coastal waters. They were air conditioned and provided improved habitability for their crews, as such, they were considered a successful submarine design. They measured 59 meters (193 ft 7 in) long overall with a beam of 6.5 m (21 ft 4 in) and a draft of 4.1 m (13 ft 5 in). They possessed a surfaced displacement of 650 tonnes (640 long tons) and 800 tonnes (790 long tons) submerged. An objective of the design was to improve underwater hydrodynamics; to achieve this, external framing was used to increase internal space and create a better double hull. They had a crew of 43.

The submarines were propelled by two propeller shafts powered by a diesel-electric system composed of two Sulzer-Mitsubishi diesel engines creating 1,300 kilowatts (1,700 shp) and two electric motors creating 970 kW (1,300 bhp). The main storage batteries were water-cooled. This gave the vessels a maximum speed of 15 knots (28 km/h; 17 mph) surfaced and 12 knots (22 km/h; 14 mph) submerged. (Note: Both Moore and Couhat have the surfaced speed as 14 knots (26 km/h; 16 mph) and the submerged speed as 11 knots (20 km/h; 13 mph).) To improve underwater maneuverability, a joystick was installed instead of the traditional wheel at the helm position. The submarines mounted three torpedo tubes in the bow for 533-millimeter (21.0 in) torpedoes. The class used a water pressure system to launch torpedoes that eliminated the creation of water bubbles.

== Boats ==
Hayashio class construction data
| Pennant no. | Name | Builder | Laid down | Launched | Commissioned | Fate |
|---|---|---|---|---|---|---|
| SS-521 | Hayashio (はやしお) | Shin Mitusbishi, Kobe | 6 June 1960 | 31 July 1961 | 30 June 1962 | Decommissioned 25 July 1977 |
| SS-522 | Wakashio (わかしお) | Kawasaki, Kobe | 7 June 1960 | 28 August 1961 | 17 August 1962 | Decommissioned 23 March 1979 |

== Construction and career ==
Both submarines were ordered in 1959 from Japanese shipyards. Both Hayashio and Wakashio entered service in 1962. On 20 May 1970, Hayashio collided with a merchant vessel damaging the submarine's periscope. They were both stricken from the naval vessel register in 1979, with Wakashio on 23 July 1979.

== See also ==
Equivalent submarines of the same era

- Daphné class
- Sutjeska class
- Draken class
