= JDS Wakashio (SS-522) =

Hayashio-class submarines

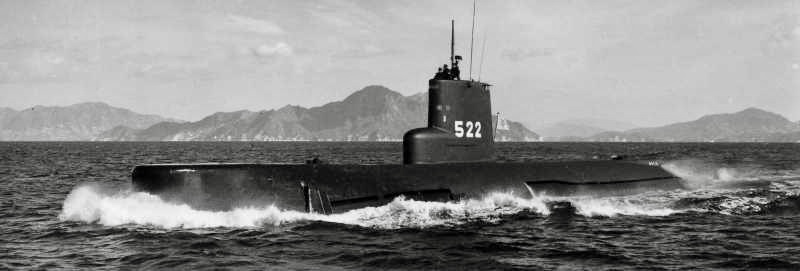
- JDS Wakashio

History

Japan
- Name: Wakashio; (わかしお)
- Ordered: 1959
- Builder: Mitsubishi, Kobe
- Laid down: 7 June 1960
- Launched: 28 August 1961
- Commissioned: 17 August 1962
- Decommissioned: 23 March 1979
- Identification: Pennant number: SS-522
- Fate: Scrapped, October 1979

General characteristics
- Class & type: Hayashio-class submarine
- Displacement: 750 long tons (762 t) (surfaced); 800 long tons (813 t) (submerged)
- Length: 59 m (193 ft 7 in)
- Beam: 6.5 m (21 ft 4 in)
- Draft: 4.1 m (13 ft 5 in)
- Depth: 6.4 m (21 ft 0 in)
- Propulsion: Diesel-electric, 2 shafts; 900 BHP (surfaced); 2,300 SHP (submerged)
- Speed: 11 knots (20 km/h; 13 mph) surfaced; 14 knots (26 km/h; 16 mph) submerged
- Complement: 40
- Armament: 3 × 533 mm (21 in) torpedo tubes

JDS Wakashio (SS-522) was the second Hayashio-class submarines. She was commissioned on 30 June 1962.

== Construction and career ==
Hayashio was laid down at Mitsubishi Heavy Industries Kobe Shipyard on 6 June 1960 and launched on 31 July 1961. She was commissioned on 30 June 1962, into the 1st Submarine Corps of the Kure District Force.

On 31 March 1963, the 1st Submarine was reorganized under the Self-Defense Fleet.

From 2 June to 19 August 1964, she participated in Hawaii dispatch training with Hayashio.

On 1 February 1965, the 1st Submarine was reorganized into the 1st Submarine Group, which was newly formed under the Self-Defense Fleet.

She was decommissioned on 23 March 1979 and dismantled at Kyowa Metal in October 1979.
