= USS Bauer =

Dealey-class destroyer escort

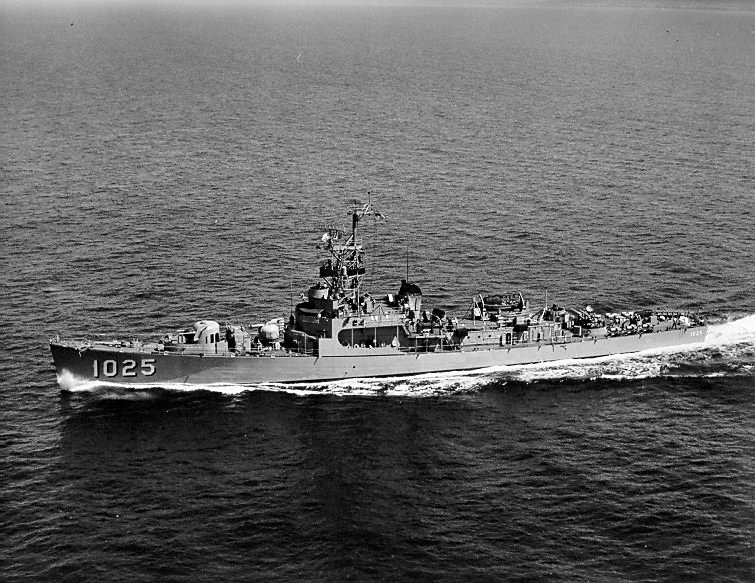
- USS Bauer (DE-1025)

History

United States
- Name: USS Bauer
- Namesake: Harold W. Bauer
- Builder: Bethlehem Shipbuilding, San Francisco
- Laid down: 1 December 1955
- Launched: 7 June 1957
- Commissioned: 21 November 1957
- Decommissioned: 3 December 1973
- Stricken: 3 December 1973
- Fate: Sold for scrap

General characteristics
- Class & type: Dealey-class destroyer escort
- Displacement: 1,877 long tons (1,907 t) full load
- Length: 314 ft 6 in (95.86 m)
- Beam: 36 ft 9 in (11.20 m)
- Draft: 18 ft (5.5 m)
- Propulsion: 2 × Foster-Wheeler boilers; 1 × De Laval geared turbine; 20,000 shp (15 MW); 1 shaft
- Speed: 27 knots (31 mph; 50 km/h)
- Range: 6,000 nmi (11,000 km) at 12 kn (14 mph; 22 km/h)
- Complement: 170
- Armament: 4 × 3-inch/50 caliber guns; 1 × Squid ASW mortar; 6 × 324 mm (12.8 in) Mark 32 torpedo tubes; Mark 46 torpedoes

Service record
- Operations: Vietnam War
- Awards: 2 Battle stars

USS Bauer (DE-1025) was a Dealey-class destroyer escort in the United States Navy. She was named for Lieutenant Colonel Harold William Bauer, naval aviator and recipient of the Medal of Honor for extraordinary heroism and conspicuous courage as Commander of Marine Fighting Squadron 212 in the South Pacific between 10 May and 14 November 1942.

== Operational service ==
Built as a mobilization test platform, Bauer was designed to meet the mass production requirements that a war with the Soviet Union might generate and to counter the growing threat from advanced Russian submarines. Assigned to Escort Squadron (CortRon) 3 at San Diego, she underwent six months of preparatory training exercises. On 12 June 1958, she departed San Diego for duty with 7th Fleet in the Far East. Arriving at Yokosuka, Japan, on 2 July, she joined the antisubmarine warfare (ASW) task group on its patrols in the East China Sea. For the next five months, the destroyer escort cruised western Pacific waters, visiting ports in Japan, the Philippines, and Taiwan, before returning to San Diego on 4 December.

Bauer resumed training with CortRon 3, conducting local operations out of San Diego until 9 September 1959, when she sailed again for the western Pacific. On this deployment - which included port visits to Japan, South Korea, and Taiwan the destroyer escort participated in President Eisenhower's "People to People" program. This included offering tours of the vessel to civilians, contributing to local charities, and participating in competitive sports with members of foreign military units. In mid-October, Bauer visited Tacloban City, in the Philippines, for the anniversary celebration of the Leyte landings on 20 October 1944 during World War II.

=== 1960s ===
The destroyer escort remained in Far Eastern waters into the new year before returning to San Diego in mid-February 1960. Normal training, including weapons firing drills and sonar tracking exercises, continued until 1 July when the warship was assigned to the newly formed CortDiv 31. Together with her sister ships Evans, Bridget, and Hooper, Bauer continued to practice submarine hunting and to test new tactics and equipment out of San Diego. In March 1961, the destroyer escort sailed for her third 7th Fleet deployment. Much as in her previous overseas assignment, the warship conducted ASW exercises with 7th Fleet warships, patrolled Far Eastern waters, and participated in the ongoing "People to People" program.

Returning to San Diego on 18 September, the warship resumed a regular schedule of local operations. Drills with submarines, such as a mid-January 1962 sonar training exercise with Redfish and Queenfish, kept her busy until 6 March when she entered drydock at the Naval Repair Facility, San Diego. During the ensuing upgrade, part of the Fleet Rehabilitation and Modernization (FRAM) program, the warship lost her after 3-inch/50 twin mount to the initial flight deck modifications for the drone antisubmarine helicopter (DASH), but received a modern SQS-23 sonar and two triple-mount lightweight ASW torpedo tubes.

On 6 June, Bauer returned to ASW training out of San Diego. Over the next several months, the warship held sonar tracking exercises with nuclear submarine Scamp and provided underway services for the antisubmarine warfare support carrier Yorktown in September. The following month, she made preparations to return to the Far East and sailed from San Diego on 26 October. The destroyer escort, in company with Yorktown and the other escorts of CortDiv 31, moored at Pearl Harbor on 1 November. After two ASW exercises held near the islands, the task group left Hawaii on 26 November for Japan. Arriving at Yokosuka on 6 December, Bauer spent the next four months conducting operations with 7th Fleet units. In January 1963, she operated in the waters off Japan, training with submarine Charr and providing screen services for Yorktown. In February and March, the warship patrolled in the South China Sea before joining the nuclear submarine Swordfish on 9 April for tracking exercises in Philippine waters.

After anchoring at Manila on 13 April, the destroyer escort spent 11 days in port before returning to sea again on 24 April. Bauer steamed to the South China Sea, where she joined British, Australian, Thai, and Pakistani warships, for Operation "Sea Serpent." During this exercise, she helped the foreign warships to practice convoy-screening operations and to learn US naval tactics. She returned to the Philippines on 8 May but put to sea again almost immediately with orders to the site of an Australian helicopter crash just outside Manila harbor. Bauer found no sign of the flight crew. The following day, the warship set course for Japan, arriving in Sasebo on 13 May. After local exercises and screening duty with Yorktown, she departed Yokosuka on 6 June to return to the United States.

Arriving at San Diego on 18 June, Bauer operated out of that port through the end of the year. Underway training filled much of her time, including a hold-down exercise with radar picket submarine Salmon in August, shore bombardment practice in September, and an electronic counter-measures test with auxiliary submarine Catfish in December. In January 1964, the warship provided screening services for antisubmarine warfare support carrier Kearsarge, and conducted ASW training in February with nuclear submarine Permit and submarine Pomodon. These exercises ended on 19 March when the destroyer escort entered the Naval Repair Facility at San Diego for a three-week overhaul. On 13 April, she began two months of refresher training, preparatory to another Far Eastern deployment, upon which she embarked on 19 June.

On 26 June 1964, Bauer stopped at Pearl Harbor for three weeks of training. Designed to familiarize her crew with Vietnam-theater operating procedures, this training continued until 20 July when she headed for Japan. Arriving at Yokosuka 10 days later, the destroyer escort remained in port until 5 August when she set out for Vietnamese waters. Taking up a position at "Yankee Station" on 11 August, the warship provided ASW protection for the growing number of US carriers operating in the South China Sea. These duties included ASW patrol, sonar contact investigation, and lifeguard station watch. This assignment—broken only by brief stops at Subic Bay, Sasebo, and Hong Kong—lasted until 30 November when she sailed for home.

Following her 16 December arrival, the destroyer escort spent the holidays in port at San Diego. She began a heavy schedule of local operations on 25 January 1965. These ranged from sonar exercises, with 12 trainees from the Pacific Fleet ASW school on board, to screening operations for attack carrier Oriskany and antisubmarine warfare support carrier Bennington. Various other drills, with submarines, escorts, and amphibious forces, also took place out of San Diego. In early March, the destroyer escort twice encountered a Russian trawler snooping around the exercise area. At the end of the month, the warship conducted two days of ASW drills off Coronado Island with the Greek submarine Triaina.

In mid-June, following a sonar project for the Fleet ASW School, the destroyer escort began preparations for a drydock period at Long Beach Naval Shipyard. After receiving services from Dixie, the warship moved to the shipyard on 30 June. She entered drydock on 27 July, left it again on 26 August, but continued to receive repairs until 10 October. Underway the next day, Bauer commenced refresher training and remained so employed until 11 January 1966 when she returned to Long Beach Naval Shipyard for modifications. These repairs lasted until 26 January when the warship returned to San Diego.

Following two months of preparatory training, Bauer got underway for Alaskan waters on 29 March 1966. The destroyer escort stopped at Esquimalt, British Columbia and at Juneau and Kodiak in Alaska before anchoring off Adak Island on 15 April. She steamed to Attu on 17 April and conducted special operations in the Bering Sea for the next five weeks. After refueling at Adak on 26 May, the warship sailed for a visit to Pearl Harbor before returning to San Diego on 13 June. For the next five months, she conducted only local exercises out of that port before sailing for the Far East on 4 November.

Arriving at Pearl Harbor on 11 November, Bauer joined Bennington for training exercises before setting out for Japan on 28 November. After mooring at Yokosuka on 8 December, the destroyer escort headed for Kaohsiung, Taiwan, on 10 December. A week later, she began patrolling the Taiwan Strait. These patrols occupied her until 12 January 1967 when she moved on to Vietnamese waters. Arriving on "Yankee Station" on 18 December, Bauer provided screen and plane guard services to the carriers for the next 10 weeks. On 7 March, she steered for Sasebo, putting into that port on 12 March. The warship entered S.S.K. Shipyard for eight weeks of repairs on 3 April. The work was completed on 30 May and she steamed for home.

Bauer sailed via Midway and Pearl Harbor and arrived at San Diego on 16 June. Following leave and upkeep, the warship conducted local training operations, including a few DASH flights, until 5 September when she sailed for Alaskan waters. Mooring at Adak on 13 September, Bauer remained in that port owing to a severe storm that crossed into the area. The next day, the storm swept medium harbor tug Pawtucket into the warship, punching a small hole in Bauer's hull. The destroyer escort suffered more damage on 15 September when rough seas drove her against the pier. Although she moved to Amchitka the following day, the weather conditions allowed only one day of Arctic sonar tracking training before forcing her south for calmer waters. The warship refueled at Pearl Harbor on 30 September and made San Diego on 8 October.

After repairing the hull damage received in the Aleutians, Bauer conducted normal training exercises out of San Diego for the next 11 months. These activities were interrupted in early January 1968 when the warship helped track California gray whales with sono-buoys while off Baja, Mexico. On 30 August, Bauer moved to the Reserve Training Compound, San Diego. Reassigned to Reserve Destroyer Squadron (ResDesRon) 27, she carried out training missions with reservists through the end of the year.

In January 1969, Bauer participated in Exercise "Bellcurve", during which she conducted raider surface attacks against an ASW task group, before resuming reservist training out of San Diego. In April, the warship embarked two groups of naval reservists for active duty training; and, in early May, the destroyer escort conducted ASW exercises for the Pacific Fleet Anti-Submarine Warfare School. On 21 May, she entered Long Beach Naval Shipyard, for a regular overhaul but continued to train reservists throughout the overhaul period. With repairs and alterations complete on 26 August, Bauer returned to reserve training out of San Diego, which occupied her time through the end of the year and into 1970.

=== 1970s ===
On 24 March 1970, Bauer got underway for a two-week training cruise, including a port visit to Mazatlan, Mexico, before returning to her usual schedule of weekend drills and underway exercises. For the next three years, Bauer continued this pattern of reserve training operations. Highlights included training cruises to San Francisco, Seattle, Portland, Vancouver, and even one voyage to Hawaii in June and July 1972. Target ship services were provided to such fleet units as the submarine Darter, and the reserve crew provided planeguard services for the carriers Ticonderoga and Coral Sea in January 1973. During this time period, she also served as the training ship for the Parche Division of the United States Naval Sea Cadet Corps (USNSCC), whose members trained at sea alongside the reserve contingent. On 13 July, however, the destroyer escort failed her service inspections. Material deficiencies such as inadequate communications systems, worn out machinery, and poor habitability, combined with a lack of environmental and crew safety gear, led to a recommendation for disposal.

Following a final reserve cruise on the last weekend in September, the warship stood down at San Diego on 1 October. Bauer was decommissioned on 3 December 1973, and her name was struck from the Navy List that same day. After a possible Military Assistance Program transfer to the Turkish Navy was cancelled, she was sold for scrap to the National Metal & Steel Corp., Terminal Island, California, on 22 August 1974.

Bauer received two battle stars for Vietnam service.

== In fiction ==
The Bob's Burgers episode "Frigate Me Knot" revolves around the decommissioning of a frigate which had the hull number of DE-1025 but was named USS Gertrude Stein.
