= Veterans' Memorial Hall =

Veterans' Memorial Hall may refer to

- Veterans' Memorial Hall (Duluth, Minnesota)
- Veterans' Memorial Hall (Richmond, New Hampshire), listed on the National Register of Historic Places listings in Cheshire County, New Hampshire
