= Samuel David Dealey =

US Navy submarine commander and Medal of Honor recipient (1906–1944)

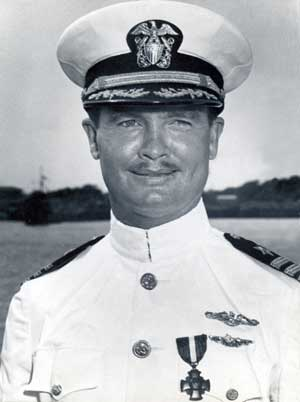
- CDR Dealey wearing the Navy Cross presented to him by Vice Admiral Lockwood 19 October 1943.
- Born: September 13, 1906; Dallas, Texas, US
- Died: August 24, 1944 (aged 37); Off Luzon, Philippines
- Burial place: Remains never recovered; listed on the Walls of the Missing, Manila American Cemetery
- Spouse: Edwine Dealey
- Military career
- Allegiance: United States
- Branch: United States Navy
- Service years: 1930–1944
- Rank: Commander
- Commands: USS S-20 (SS-125); USS Harder (SS-257)
- Conflicts: World War II
- Awards: Medal of Honor; Navy Cross (4); Distinguished Service Cross; Silver Star; Purple Heart; Combat Action Ribbon

Samuel David Dealey (September 13, 1906 – August 24, 1944) was the commanding officer of a United States Navy submarine killed in action with his crew during World War II. Among American service members, he is among the most decorated for valor during war, receiving the Medal of Honor, the Navy Cross (4), the Army Distinguished Service Cross, and the Silver Star for his service on the submarine USS Harder. He was the nephew of George B. Dealey, publisher of the Dallas News and for whom Dealey Plaza is named.

== Early life and career ==
Sam Dealey was born on September 13, 1906, in Dallas, Texas. His mother moved the family temporarily to Santa Monica, California, following his father's death in 1912, returning in time for Sam Dealey to graduate high school in Dallas. He was appointed to the U.S. Naval Academy at Annapolis, Maryland, from Texas and graduated in June 1930. Dealey was commissioned an ensign and reported for sea duty aboard the battleship USS Nevada, where he was promoted in June 1933 to lieutenant (junior grade). In March 1934, he briefly transferred to the destroyer USS Rathburne, then reported that summer for submarine training at the Submarine School, New London, Connecticut. After graduating, he served on board the submarines USS S-34 and USS S-24. Remaining on sea duty, he reported on board USS Nautilus then USS Bass.

In May 1937, he was assigned as an aide to the executive officer at Naval Air Station, Pensacola, Florida (NAS Pensacola). While there, in June 1938, he was promoted to lieutenant. In the summer of 1939, he was assigned as the executive officer (first officer) on board the destroyer USS Reuben James. In April 1941, he reported to Experimental Division One for duty as the prospective commanding officer (PCO) of USS S-20 to support at-sea experiments off New London. He commanded S-20 for two years, serving aboard at the United States' entry into World War II.

== World War II ==
When war broke out, Dealey's practical qualifications led to assignment as commanding officer of the new-construction Gato-class submarine USS Harder, which he commissioned on December 2, 1942, less than a year after the Attack on Pearl Harbor. After a shakedown off the East Coast, Dealey survived a "blue-on-blue" attack by a Navy patrol bomber in the Caribbean Sea to bring Harder to the Pacific in the spring of 1943.

=== First patrol ===
Harder left Pearl Harbor, Hawaii on her first war patrol on June 7, 1943, bound for the coast of southern Honshu. In Dealey's first attack on a two-ship enemy convoy late on the night of June 21, the submarine was driven down deep by an aggressive enemy escort and crashed into the muddy bottom – an inauspicious beginning, even though it now appears that one enemy target may have been damaged. Dealey backed the submarine out of the mud, and two nights later had his first real success in torpedoing the Japanese seaplane tender Sagara Maru (7,000 tons) and crippling the enemy ship so badly that it was beached on the Japanese mainland and abandoned as a total loss. Over the next four days, Dealey made seven attacks on three different enemy ship convoys, but post-war analysis credits him only with possible damage to one enemy ship.

=== Second patrol ===
Harder returned to Midway Island on July 7, 1943, with one of its four diesel engines completely broken down. The submarine was one of twelve Gato boats fitted originally with the troublesome Hooven-Owens-Rentschler (HOR) engines, whose original design was licensed from the German firm Maschinenfabrik Augsburg-Nürnberg (MAN) in the 1930s. After some hasty repairs and bearing a generous inventory of spare engine parts, Harder returned to sea for a second war patrol off Honshu in late August. In 14 days it made nine attacks, which netted Dealey five enemy ships sunk for 15,000 tons in the postwar accounting. Once again, the submarine suffered engine problems throughout the patrol but returned safely to Pearl Harbor, via Midway, on October 7, 1943.

=== Third patrol ===
At the end of October 1943, COMSUBPAC, Vice Admiral Charles A. Lockwood, ordered Harder, USS Snook, and USS Pargo to the Marianas as a submarine wolfpack to attack Japanese shipping in preparation for the invasion of Tarawa. At that stage of the war, "coordinated operations" among submarines were still hampered by poor communications. Thus, after collaborating with Pargo in attacking an enemy freighter on October 12 – with results never clearly established – and sinking a small enemy minesweeper with gunfire that night, Dealey was soon separated from the rest and operating independently. On November 19, he picked up an enemy convoy of three large Japanese freighters with accompanying escorts north of the Marianas and positioned for an attack, altogether firing ten torpedoes in his first attempt, scoring hits on two enemy targets. Driven below by the enemy escort ships, Dealey surfaced later that night to chase the enemy freighter that had managed to escape undamaged. Eventually firing 11 more torpedoes at the fugitive ship for two hits and four circular runs – then driven off by defensive gunfire from the tenacious Japanese gunners – Dealey broke off the engagement and returned to Pearl Harbor because of lack of torpedoes. Later, it was established all three enemy ships had sunk, the third – Nikko Maru – late that night, giving Dealey and Harder a total of four enemy ships sunk (over 15,000 tons) for their third war patrol. Once again, however, one of Harder's HOR engines had failed completely, and the other three engines were kept running only by cannibalizing the fourth engine. Thus, shortly after the submarine arrived at Hawaii on November 30, Harder was sent back to Mare Island to be re-engined with General Motors diesel engines.

=== Fourth patrol ===
Dealey brought Harder back to Pearl Harbor in late February 1944 and took her out for her fourth war patrol on March 16, 1944, accompanied by USS Seahorse. Initially assigned lifeguard duty for downed U.S. aviators in the western Caroline Islands, Harder on April 1 was sent to rescue an injured navy pilot on a small enemy-held island just west of Woleai, which had been hit that day by an American aircraft carrier strike. Under an umbrella of friendly air cover, Dealey nosed Harder toward the beach until he could ground the bow up against the encircling reef and hold it there by working both screws. Then, in the face of Japanese sniper fire only partially suppressed by the circling aircraft, a rubber boat was sent in to retrieve the navy pilot, Ensign John Galvin, who was brought to safety in what soon became a legendary rescue. As Blair describes it:

By the time Harder got to the reported position, the aviator, Ensign John R. Galvin, was already stranded high and dry on the beach. Dealey lay alongside a reef. Dealey's third officer, Samuel Moore Logan, and two volunteers jumped in the water with a rubber raft, secured to Harder by a line. They fought their way through the surf and coral to the island and picked up Ensign Galvin. As they were attempting to get back to Harder, a navy floatplane landed to help. It ran over the line and parted it. Another Harder volunteer jumped in the water and swam another line through the surf and coral to the beach. While navy planes circled overhead, Japanese snipers fired away from the foliage while the Harder's men pulled the raft and the five men aboard. The rescue was later hailed as one of the boldest on record.

Continuing his war patrol, Dealey next scored his first of four successes against the toughest target of all – an enemy Japanese destroyer. Spotted by an enemy aircraft north of the Western Carolines on April 13, 1944, Harder became the quarry of a patrolling enemy destroyer Ikazuchi, which closed to within 900 yd (820 m) before Dealey fired a spread of torpedoes. The destroyer sank within five minutes. Dealey's ensuing contact report quickly became famous: "Expended four torpedoes and one Jap destroyer". Four days later, Dealey also sank Matsue Maru (7,000 tons) near Woleai – then surfaced again near the island on April 20 to bombard the beleaguered Japanese garrison with his submarine's 4 in (100 mm) deck gun. Harder ended its fourth war patrol at Fremantle, Australia, on May 3, 1944.

=== Fifth patrol – Medal of Honor action ===
Next, Dealey was ordered to take Harder on patrol on May 26, 1944, off the Japanese fleet anchorage at Tawi Tawi. Dealey was asked to pick up some friendly guerrilla fighters from nearby northeastern Borneo. Heading into the Sibutu Passage on the night of June 6/7 he came upon an enemy convoy of three tankers in ballast, escorted by two destroyers. One destroyer detected him and attacked. Again, Dealey let the enemy destroyer close to less than 1,100 yd (1,000 m) before firing three torpedoes, and Minasuki became his second destroyer victim. Then Dealey pursued, executing an end around. Diving to radar depth, he was attacked by the second destroyer. He fired all six bow tubes from just 1,200 yd (1,100 m); all missed, and Harder plunged accidentally to 400 ft (120 m), losing contact. At 11.43 on 7 June, Dealey encountered another destroyer, Hayanami, south of Tawi Tawi, and attacked with three torpedoes from point blank range, 650 yd (590 m); all three hit. Hayanami blew up virtually overhead, and one of her sisters subjected Harder to a two-hour depth charge attack. By 17.30, there were eight hunting him. Dealey slipped away. Harder transited the Sibutu Passage to pick up the guerrilla force on the night of June 8/9 and headed back early the next day.

In the narrowest part of the Passage, Dealey spotted what appeared to be two more patrolling Japanese destroyers and made an undetected approach. Firing four torpedoes at the overlapping targets, he was rewarded with two hits on Tanikaze, which sank almost immediately. Dealey thought he had scored a hit and sunk another destroyer also, but (notoriously inaccurate) postwar records failed to confirm it. On June 10, 1944, Dealey sighted a large Japanese task force: three battleships, four cruisers, and their screening destroyers, but the submarine was spotted by an enemy airplane, and one of the enemy escorts pressed an attack on the sub. Dealey sent three torpedoes "down the throat", heard several explosions, and thought he had scored another kill, before diving to avoid two hours of relentless depth-charging. Postwar, Japanese records later showed the destroyer was able to avoid his torpedoes. Dealey returned to Darwin, Australia on June 21 after an outstanding patrol that firmly established his reputation as the "Destroyer Killer," with what was then thought to be a total of six to his credit. Of greater strategic importance was the ensuing decision by Japanese Admiral Soemu Toyoda to abandon Tawi Tawi anchorage as too exposed to enemy submarines, a sortie that then precipitated the Battle of the Philippine Sea.

In a curious incident, Rear Admiral Ralph Waldo Christie, who commanded U.S. submarines at Fremantle, ordered Harder back to sea on the day she arrived, ostensibly to seek out and attack a Japanese cargo ship that carried nickel ore from Celebes to the homeland once a month – but also to give Christie an opportunity to participate personally in a short war patrol. Assigned on June 27, 1944, to intercept a damaged Japanese cruiser returning from the Battle of the Philippine Sea, Dealey was unable to close for an attack and was similarly outmaneuvered by the "nickel ship" three days later, when Japanese patrol aircraft forced him down and kept him there. Harder returned to Darwin without further incident on July 3, and the whole episode was treated simply as an extension of the ship's fifth patrol.

During their time together, however, Admiral Christie took Dealey aside and noted his opinion that after five successful war patrols, it was time for Dealey to relinquish command to his executive officer, Tiny Lynch, and move on to other duty. Dealey demurred. With about a third of Harder's crew about to be replaced (following the Navy's standard crew rotation policy), he felt a personal responsibility to break in the new men before turning the boat over to a fledgling commanding officer. Ultimately, Christie agreed Dealey could take Harder out for one more patrol, her sixth.

=== Sixth patrol ===
After a two-week rest at "Bend of the Elbow", Dealey considered himself sufficiently rested. Lynch, who would have gotten Harder, disagreed. Dealey left Fremantle on August 5, 1944, commanding a three-sub wolfpack, joined by USS Haddo (Chester Nimitz, Jr.) and USS Hake (Frank E. Haylor, who replaced John Broach). Their objective was the destruction of Japanese shipping off the west coast of the Philippines, south of the Luzon Strait. After being informed (thanks to a contact report from William Kinsella's USS Ray, himself guided by Ultra) Japanese convoy HI-71 holed up in Paluan Bay in northern Mindoro, Harder and Haddo joined three other U.S. submarines (Guitarro, Raton, and Kinsella's Ray, with only four torpedoes remaining), all under Dealey's command (as senior officer present afloat). When the enemy convoy sortied at 05.45 on August 21, the resulting mêlée – punctuated by intense depth charge barrages by the Japanese – left four enemy merchantmen totaling 22,400 tons on the bottom, with all five U.S. submarines unscathed. Of the four victims, two were credited to Haddo, and one to Guitarro, while Dealey failed to score, after Kinsella's attack (the informal pack's first) caused the convoy to steer away from Harder.

Dealey and Nimitz then moved northward to Manila Bay, arriving that same evening, and shortly after midnight picked up three small targets on radar. These were three 900-ton enemy frigates, late of HI-71. Co-ordinating with Nimitz, at around 04.00, Dealey fired bow tubes, hitting Matsuwa and Hiburi; Haddo scored hits in Sado. At first light, Dealey finished off Matsuwa and Nimitz Sado; when Nimitz missed Hiburi, Dealey finished her off. The two submarines then moved northward along Luzon to rendezvous with Hake, but on the morning of 23 August, Nimitz expended his last torpedoes in sinking the destroyer Asakaze. Believing Asakaze had only been crippled and towed into Dasol Bay, south of Lingayan, Harder and Hake lay in wait outside.

At 05.54 on August 24, 1944, two ships emerged from Dasol Bay – a minesweeper, Kaibokan CD-22, and the ex-American destroyer USS Stewart (now operating as PB-102). Hake maneuvered to attack PB-102, but became suspicious and broke off when the destroyer turned back into the bay. Meanwhile, Kaibokan CD-22 continued out, pinging continually, and Hake moved off to evade. Haylor caught a last glimpse of Harder's periscope at 0647. At 0728, Haylor heard a string of 15 depth charge explosions in the distance; then nothing.

Remaining in the area all day, Haylor surfaced after dark, at 20.10, and tried to contact Dealey, with no success. Over the next two weeks, Haylor continued his search, but no sign of Dealey or Harder materialized. On September 10, Nimitz returned after refuelling and reloading, confirming Dealey had not returned, as Haylor hoped. It became apparent the enemy minesweeper had been successful on August 24 in ending their extraordinary run. Indeed, after the war, Japanese records showed an antisubmarine attack that morning off Caiman Point had resulted in oil, wood chips, and cork floating in the vicinity. Dealey's death produced waves of "profound shock" and grief through the entire Submarine Force.

Dealey's loss is still blamed on fatigue by some, such as Lynch. It widened the gulf between Christie and Lockwood. In addition, Christie's attempt to nominate Dealey for a Medal of Honor was thwarted by Admiral Thomas C. Kinkaid, who argued the award of an Army Distinguished Service Cross for the patrol precluded any Navy decoration. Dealey did eventually get the Medal, only the fourth submariner so honored at that time.

In the final analysis, Dealey had sunk 16 enemy ships, with total tonnage of 54,002 tons (according to the postwar accounting) – enough to make him number five among U.S. submarine skippers in World War II.

== World War II summary ==
Summary of Commander Samuel D. Dealey's Harder's war patrols
	Departing From	Date	Days	Wartime Credit Ships/Tonnage	JANAC Credit Ships/Tonnage	Patrol Area
Harder-1	Pearl Harbor, TH	June 1943	33	3 / 15,400	1 / 7,189	Empire
Harder-2	Pearl Harbor, TH	August 1943	46	4 / 25,300	5 / 15,272	Empire
Harder-3	Pearl Harbor, TH	October 1943	31	5 / 24,800	3 / 15,270	Marianas
Harder-4	Pearl Harbor, TH	March 1944	47	2 / 5,300	2 / 9,011	–>Fremantle
Harder-5	Fremantle, Australia	May 1944	45	5 / 8,500	3 / 5,500	Celebes
Harder-6	Fremantle, Australia	August 1944	lost	1 ½ / 3,200	2 / 1,760	South China Sea

Commander Dealey's ranking compared with other top skippers
Ranking	Number of Patrols	Ships/Tons Credited	Ships/Tons JANAC
5	6	20 ½ / 82,500	16 / 54,002

== Awards and honors ==
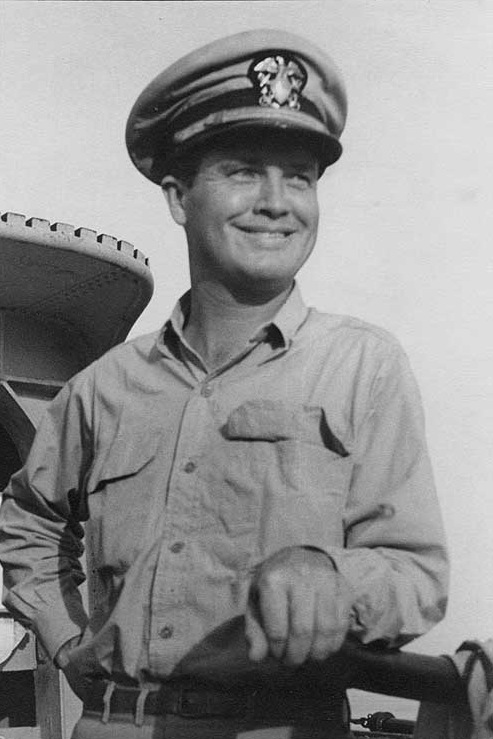
CDR Samuel D. Dealey

In addition to his Medal of Honor, his other awards include the Navy Cross with three gold 5/16 inch stars, the Distinguished Service Cross (Army award, was presented by General Douglas MacArthur), the Silver Star, and the Purple Heart. While under his command the USS Harder (SS-257) was awarded the Presidential Unit Citation for its performance in combat.

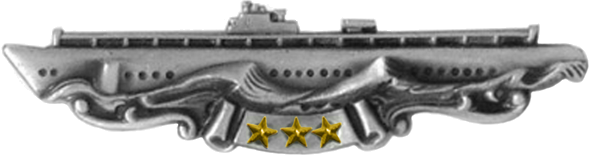

Submarine Warfare insignia
Medal of Honor
Navy Cross w/ three 5/16" Gold Stars	Distinguished Service Cross	Silver Star
Purple Heart	Navy Presidential Unit Citation	American Defense Service Medal w/ Fleet Clasp (3/16" Bronze Star)
American Campaign Medal w/ one 3/16" Bronze Star	Asiatic-Pacific Campaign Medal w/ one 3/16" Silver Star and two 3/16" Bronze Stars	World War II Victory Medal
Submarine Combat Patrol insignia

=== Medal of Honor citation ===
Rank and organization: Commander, U.S. Navy. Born: September 13, 1906, Dallas, Tex. Appointed from: Texas. Other Navy awards: Navy Cross with 3 Gold 5/16 Inch Stars, Silver Star Medal.

Citation:

For conspicuous gallantry and intrepidity at the risk of his life above and beyond the call of duty as Commanding Officer of the U.S.S. Harder during her 5th War Patrol in Japanese-controlled waters. Floodlit by a bright moon and disclosed to an enemy destroyer escort which bore down with intent to attack, Comdr. Dealey quickly dived to periscope depth and waited for the pursuer to close range, then opened fire, sending the target and all aboard down in flames with his third torpedo. Plunging deep to avoid fierce depth charges, he again surfaced and, within 9 minutes after sighting another destroyer, had sent the enemy down tail first with a hit directly amidship. Evading detection, he penetrated the confined waters off Tawi Tawi with the Japanese Fleet base 6 miles away and scored death blows on 2 patrolling destroyers in quick succession. With his ship heeled over by concussion from the first exploding target and the second vessel nose-diving in a blinding detonation, he cleared the area at high speed. Sighted by a large hostile fleet force on the following day, he swung his bow toward the lead destroyer for another "down-the-throat" shot, fired 3 bow tubes and promptly crash-dived to be terrifically rocked seconds later by the exploding ship as the Harder passed beneath. This remarkable record of 5 vital Japanese destroyers sunk in 5 short-range torpedo attacks attests the valiant fighting spirit of Comdr. Dealey and his indomitable command.

=== Medal of Honor controversy ===
Perhaps smarting from his decision to allow Dealey to undertake a sixth war patrol at a time when several colleagues thought he was tired and overly fatigued, RADM Christie nominated Dealey for a posthumous Medal of Honor immediately after the loss was reported. This action became mired in a controversy. General Douglas MacArthur had previously awarded the Army Distinguished Service Cross to Dealey for his prior accomplishments in the theater. Thomas Kinkaid, COMSEVENTHFLT (MacArthur's naval commander) disapproved Dealey for the Medal of Honor on the grounds that he had already been honored adequately. This dispute was one of several that led to growing personal animosity between Christie and Kinkaid, culminating in Kinkaid's relieving Christie in December 1944. Christie then returned to Washington, finally receiving MacArthur's support for the Medal of Honor which was presented posthumously to Dealey's wife, Edwina, on August 29, 1945.

=== Posthumous honors ===
- Commander Dealey was awarded the Medal of Honor for Harder's fifth war patrol and was posthumously awarded the Silver Star for gallantry in action during Harder's sixth war patrol.
- In 1953, USS Dealey (DE-1006) was named in his honor; she was the lead ship of her class of destroyer escort.
- There is a plaque in Dealey's honor in the Science Place in Fair Park, Dallas, Texas.
- Sam Dealey Drive in Dallas, Texas was named after him.

== See also ==
- Eugene B. Fluckey
- List of Medal of Honor recipients for World War II
