= End around =

End around can have several meanings:

- The end-around, a type of trick play in American football
- End Around (submarine tactic), used in World War II
