= USS Dealey =

Dealey-class destroyer escort

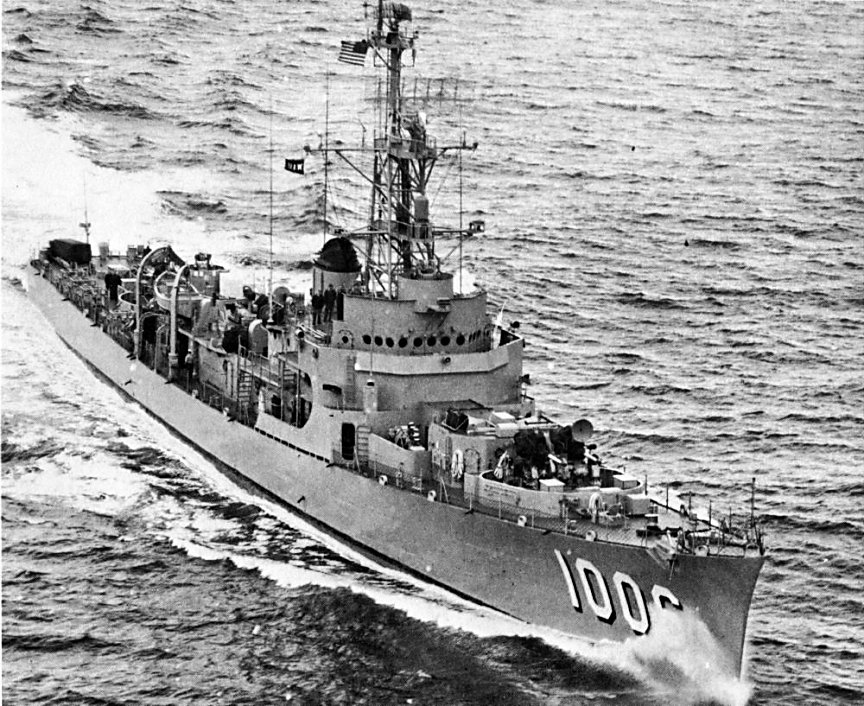
- Dealey underway, c. 28 May 1954

History

United States
- Name: USS Dealey
- Namesake: Commander Samuel David Dealey (1906–1944)
- Builder: Bath Iron Works, Bath, Maine
- Laid down: 15 December 1952
- Launched: 8 November 1953
- Sponsored by: Mrs. Samuel D. Dealey
- Commissioned: 3 June 1954
- Decommissioned: 28 July 1972
- Stricken: 28 July 1972
- Fate: Transferred to Uruguay

Uruguay
- Name: ROU 18 De Julio
- Namesake: 18 July, the date of the adoption of Uruguay's first constitution
- Acquired: 28 July 1972
- Stricken: 1991
- Identification: DE-3
- Fate: Scrapped 1991

General characteristics
- Class & type: Dealey-class destroyer escort
- Displacement: 1,270 long tons (1,290 t)
- Length: 314 ft 6 in (95.86 m)
- Beam: 36 ft 9 in (11.20 m)
- Draft: 18 ft (5.5 m)
- Propulsion: 2 × Foster-Wheeler boilers; 1 × De Laval geared turbine; 20,000 shp (15 MW); 1 shaft
- Speed: 25 knots (29 mph; 46 km/h)
- Complement: 170
- Armament: 4 × 3"/50 caliber guns; 1 × Squid ASW mortar; 6 × 324 mm (12.8 in) Mark 32 torpedo tubes; Mark 46 torpedoes

USS Dealey (DE-1006), the lead ship of her class of destroyer escort, was a ship of the United States Navy in commission from 1954 to 1972 and named for Commander Samuel D. Dealey (1906–1944), who was awarded the Medal of Honor as commanding officer of the famous World War II submarine USS Harder (SS-257).

== History ==
Dealey was launched 8 November 1953 by Bath Iron Works Corporation, Bath, Maine, sponsored by Mrs. Samuel D. Dealey, widow of Commander Dealey, and commissioned on 3 June 1954.

Homeported at Naval Station Newport at Newport, Rhode Island, Dealey steamed on local exercises, cruised to Key West, Florida, to serve with the Fleet Sonar School, and joined in convoy exercises in the Caribbean during her first two-and-a-half years of service.

On 4 January 1957 she departed Newport for a South American cruise, returning 21 March 1957 for exercises off the United States East Coast. North Atlantic Treaty Organization (NATO) exercises in the Irish Sea in September and October 1957 took her to Plymouth, England, and Brest and Cherbourg, France.

On 12 May 1958 Dealey sailed for the Mediterranean as flagship of Escort Squadron 10 (CortRon 10), screening the aircraft carrier USS Wasp to her duty with the United States Sixth Fleet. Dealey patrolled the eastern Mediterranean during the Lebanon crisis and returned to Newport on 7 October 1958.

On 3 February 1959 Dealey put to sea for Guantanamo Bay Naval Base, Cuba, and after exercises there transited the Panama Canal for calls at Buenaventura, Colombia; Salinas, Ecuador; Talara and Callao, Peru; and Valparaíso and Antofagasta, Chile. During this cruise she exercised with the navies of all four countries. She returned to Newport on 20 April 1959, and sailed on NATO exercises, calling at Derry, Northern Ireland; Greenwich, England; and Lisbon, Portugal, before returning to Newport on 11 October 1959. She operated in the Narragansett Bay area for the remainder of 1959.

Dealey continued these operations, plus a cruise to the Caribbean and an amphibious exercise off the Virginia and North Carolina coasts, until 20 June 1960 when she began a short overhaul at the New York Naval Shipyard in Brooklyn, New York. Returning to Newport on 22 July 1960, she prepared for distant duty. On 22 August 1960, she sailed for exercises in the Caribbean, and continued on a voyage around South America. After visits to Trinidad, Venezuela, and Colombia, Dealey sailed through the Panama Canal, down the coast of South America, calling in Ecuador, Peru, and Chile, transited the Straits of Magellan, and turned northward, visiting Argentina, Uruguay, Brazil, and Trinidad. After riding out a wild storm, Dealey arrived home in Newport coated in ice on 13 December 1960; she passed the remainder of 1960 there.

== ROU 18 De Julio (DE-3) ==
Dealey was decommissioned on 28 July 1972 and simultaneously stricken from the Naval Vessel Register. She was transferred to the Uruguayan Navy the same day, and renamed ROU 18 De Julio (DE-3), the third ship to commemorate the date of the adoption of Uruguay's first constitution. She arrived at Montevideo, Uruguay on 17 April 1973.

In 1981, 18 de Julio rescued the crew of the merchant ship MS Harp, sunk in heavy storm in the South Atlantic Ocean.

18 de Julio was stricken and broken up for scrap during 1991.
