= Stanford Caldwell Hooper =

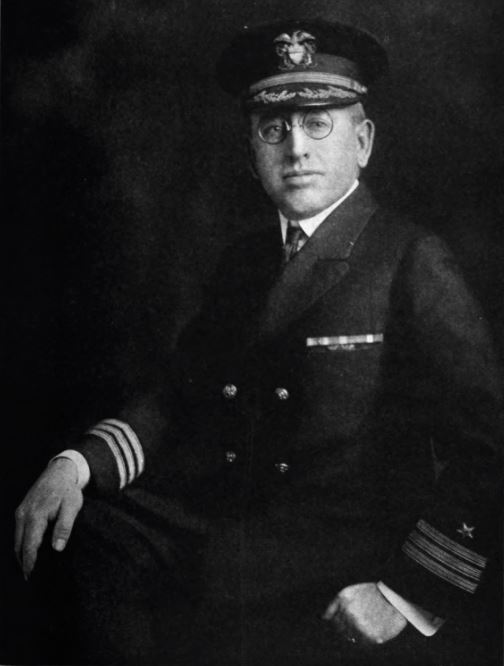
- Born: August 16, 1884; Colton, California, U.S.
- Died: April 6, 1955 (aged 70); Miami Beach, Florida, U.S.
- Military career
- Allegiance: United States of America
- Branch: United States Navy
- Service years: 1905–1945
- Rank: Rear Admiral
- Commands: USS Fairfax
- Conflicts: World War I World War II
- Awards: Navy Cross

Stanford Caldwell Hooper (August 16, 1884 – April 6, 1955) was a Rear Admiral of the United States Navy, and a noted radio pioneer who has been called "the Father of Naval Radio". Hooper conducted pioneering radio tests, established land stations for communication with the fleet, and served as technical advisor and head of many boards and committees dealing with communications.

== Biography ==
Hooper was born in Colton, California, and educated in the San Bernardino public schools. At age 8 his father built him a telegraph transmitter and taught him Morse code; by age 10 he was working as a relief telegraph operator during summer vacations. He entered the United States Naval Academy at age 15, and after graduation in 1905 served on various ships. From 1910-1911 he taught electricity, physics, and chemistry at the Naval Academy, then from 1912-1914 (and again 1923-1925) served as the first Fleet Radio Officer, where he created the Navy's tactical signaling codes. During 1915-1917, 1919–1923 and 1926-1928 he was in charge of the Navy's Radio Division. In 1917-1918 he commanded the Fairfax, for which he was awarded the Navy Cross for distinguished service. In 1922 he supervised installation of the first wireless telephone in the White House for President Warren Harding. In 1928 he was appointed the Chief Engineer for the new Federal Radio Commission, the predecessor of the Federal Communications Commission. Afterward he served as Director of Naval Communications from 1928 to 1934, and on the staff of the Chief of Naval Operations in various capacities until June 1942, having won promotion to rear admiral in June 1938. He was forcibly retired in January 1943 following a clash with Federal Communications Commission chairman James Lawrence Fly in mid-1942, though remained activated until June 1945. He became a contractor with commercial electronics firms after retiring until his death.

== Awards and honors ==
Hooper received the IEEE Medal of Honor in 1934 "for the orderly planning and systematic organization of radio communication in the Government Service with which he is associated, and the concomitant and resulting advances in the development of radio equipment and procedure." In 1945 he received the Elliott Cresson Medal for research in radio electronics from the Franklin Institute of Philadelphia, and in 1948 an honorary LL.D. from Drury College. He also received the French Légion d'honneur, the Department of Navy Electronics Trophy, and the Marconi Medal of Honor. The destroyer USS Hooper (DE-1026) was named in his honor, and he is honored annually via the Rear Admiral S. C. Hooper Trophy.

== Sources ==
- IEEE History Center biography
- Susan J. Douglas, "The Navy Adopts the Radio, 1899-1919", in Military Enterprise and Technological Change: Perspectives on the American Experience, Merritt Roe Smith (ed.), MIT Press, 1985, pages 154-174. ISBN 0-262-19239-X.
- "Wireless Telephone Receiver Installed in Harding's Study", The New York Times, February 9, 1922.
- Photo gallery of USS Hooper (DE 1026) at NavSource Naval History
