= Admiral Pereira da Silva-class frigate =

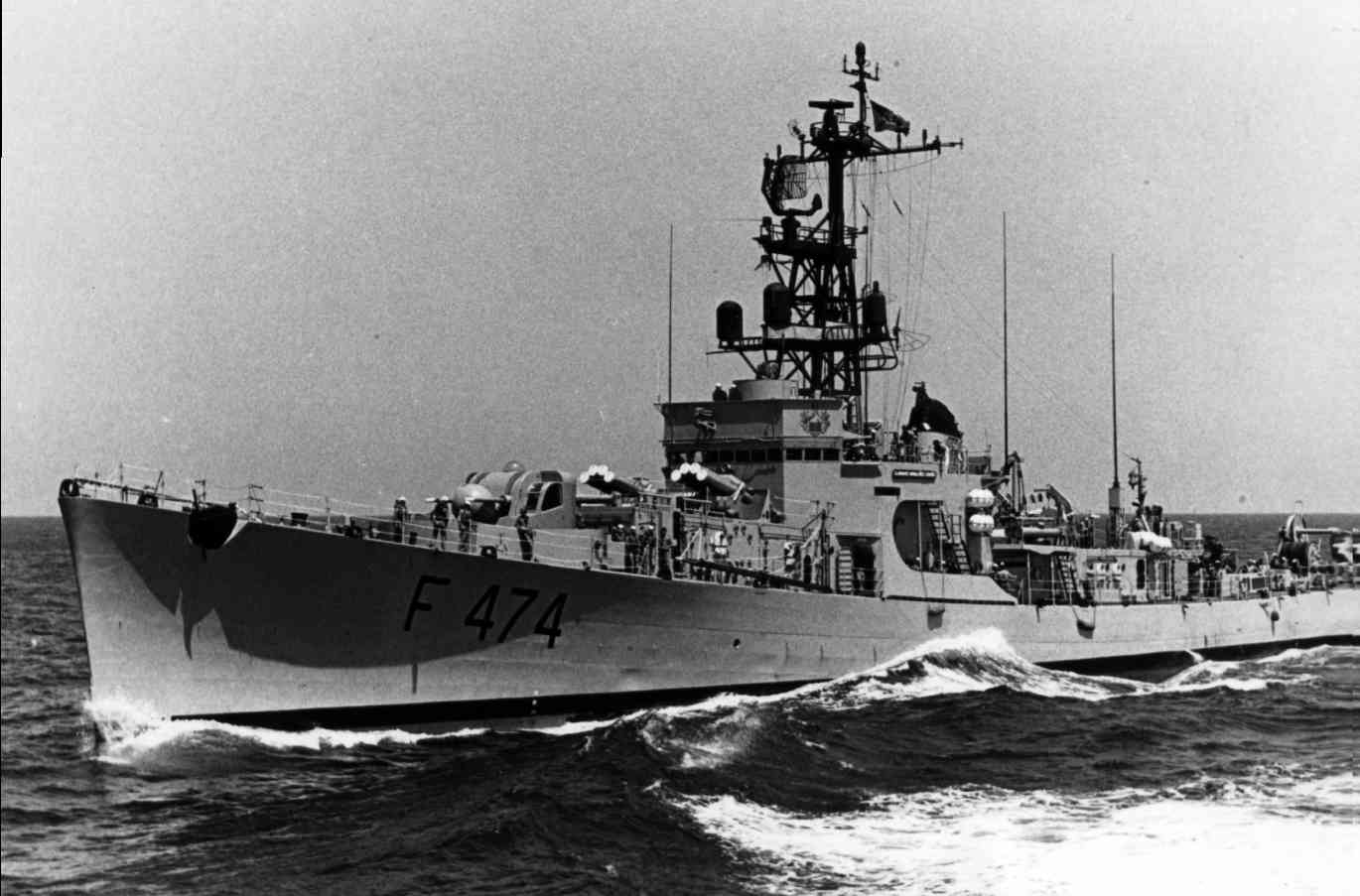
- Admiral Magalhães Correia underway

Class overview
- Name: Admiral Pereira da Silva class
- Builders: Lisnave - Lisbon ENVC - Viana do Castelo
- Operators: Portuguese Navy
- Preceded by: Pacheco Pereira class
- Succeeded by: João Belo class
- Built: 1962–1968
- In commission: 1966–1989
- Planned: 3
- Completed: 3
- Retired: 3

General characteristics
- Type: Frigate
- Displacement: 1,914 t (1,884 long tons)
- Length: 95.9 m (314 ft 8 in)
- Beam: 11.18 m (36 ft 8 in)
- Draught: 5.33 m (17 ft 6 in)
- Propulsion: 2 × Foster-Wheeler boilers; 1 × De Laval geared turbine; 15,000 kW (20,000 shp); 1 shaft
- Speed: 27 knots (50 km/h; 31 mph)
- Range: 3,220 nmi (5,960 km; 3,710 mi) at 15 knots (28 km/h; 17 mph)
- Complement: 166
- Sensors & processing systems: Mark 63 fire-control system
- Armament: 2 × 76 mm (3 in) guns; 2 × triple 533 mm (21 in) torpedo tubes; 2 × 375 mm (14.75 in) anti-submarine rocket launchers; 2 × depth charge throwers

The Admiral Pereira da Silva class of frigates, also known as Admiral-class frigates, were in the service of the Portuguese Navy between 1966 and 1985. The class was based on the Dealey-class destroyer escort of the United States Navy. The three ships of the class were built in Portugal, at the Lisnave shipyards and the shipyards of Viana do Castelo. The construction of the ships was part of the effort of Portugal to expand its fleet in the face of unrest in the empire and was financed by the United States via the Mutual Defense Assistance Program. Financial problems prevented them from ever being modernised and they were deleted in 1989.

== Design and description ==
By the 1960s, Portugal retained an extensive empire and the vast majority of the Portuguese Navy's warships were dedicated to patrolling its waters. However, in that decade the empire saw unrest and invasion and the navy was expanded to meet those threats. Three ships were ordered from Portuguese shipyards to a modified design of the American Dealey-class destroyer escorts. They were funded in the United States as hulls DE-1039, DE-1042 and DE-1046 under the Mutual Defense Assistance Program. The vessels were modified for service in tropical climates for service within the empire. Rated as frigates by the Portuguese Navy, they measured 95.9 metres (314 ft 8 in) long overall with a beam of 11.18 m (36 ft 8 in) and a standard draught of 4.3 m (14 ft 1 in) and a maximum draught of 5.33 m (17 ft 6 in). The frigates had a standard displacement of 1,450 tonnes (1,430 long tons) and 1,914 t (1,884 long tons) at full load. They had a complement of 166 including 12 officers.

The Admiral Pereira da Silva-class ships were propelled by a propeller on a single shaft turned by a De Laval geared turbine creating 15,000 kilowatts (20,000 shp). It was powered by steam from two Foster-Wheeler boilers creating 2,100 kilopascals (300 psi) of pressure at 454 °C (850 °F). This gave the frigates a maximum speed of 27 knots (50 km/h; 31 mph). They carried 400 t (390 long tons; 440 short tons) of fuel oil giving them a range of 3,220 nautical miles (5,960 km; 3,710 mi) at 15 knots (28 km/h; 17 mph).

The vessels were primarily designed for anti-submarine warfare (ASW). They were armed with two twin-mounted 3-inch (76 mm)/50-caliber dual-purpose guns, with one turret forward and one aft. (Note: In United States Navy gun nomenclature, the "/50 caliber" denotes the length of the gun. In this case, the /50 gun is 50 caliber, meaning that the gun barrel is 50 times as long as it is in diameter.) In the "B" position forward, the frigates mounted two four-barrelled Bofors 375 mm (14.75 in) anti-submarine rocket launchers. The Admiral Pereira da Silvas also mounted two depth charge throwers and two triple 324 mm (12.75 in) Mk 32 ASW torpedo tubes for Mark 44 torpedoes.

Admiral Pereira da Silva-class frigates were equipped with Mark 63 fire-control systems. They were also fitted with MLA-1B search, Type 978 tactical and SPG-34 fire control radars. Th three ships of the class were equipped with different sonar to reduce frequency interference. Admiral Pereira da Silva was given SQS-30, Admiral Gago Coutinho was given SQS-31 and Admiral Magalhães Correia was given SQS-31. All three vessels mounted SQA-10A variable depth sonar and DUBA-38 sonar.

== Ships ==
Admiral Pereira da Silva class construction data
Pennant number	Ship name	Builder	Laid down	Launched	Commissioned	Fate
F 472	Admiral Pereira da Silva	Lisnave	14 June 1962	2 December 1963	20 December 1966	Deleted 1989
F 473	Admiral Gago Coutinho	Lisnave	2 December 1963	13 August 1965	29 November 1967	Deleted 1989
F 474	Admiral Magalhães Correia	Viana do Castelo	30 August 1963	26 April 1965	4 November 1968	Deleted 1989

== Construction and career ==
All three ships were constructed in Portugal. After they entered service, the Portuguese Empire was disassembled beginning in the 1970s and the Portuguese economy suffered as a result. This prevented the ships from ever receiving their planned refits and saw maintenance issues increase over their careers. They were intended to be replaced by Dutch Kortenaer-class frigates but Portugal acquired the Vasco da Gama-class frigates instead.

== See also ==
- Oslo-class frigate - Norwegian ship class based on US Dealey class
