= USS Courtney (DE-1021) =

Dealey-class destroyer escort

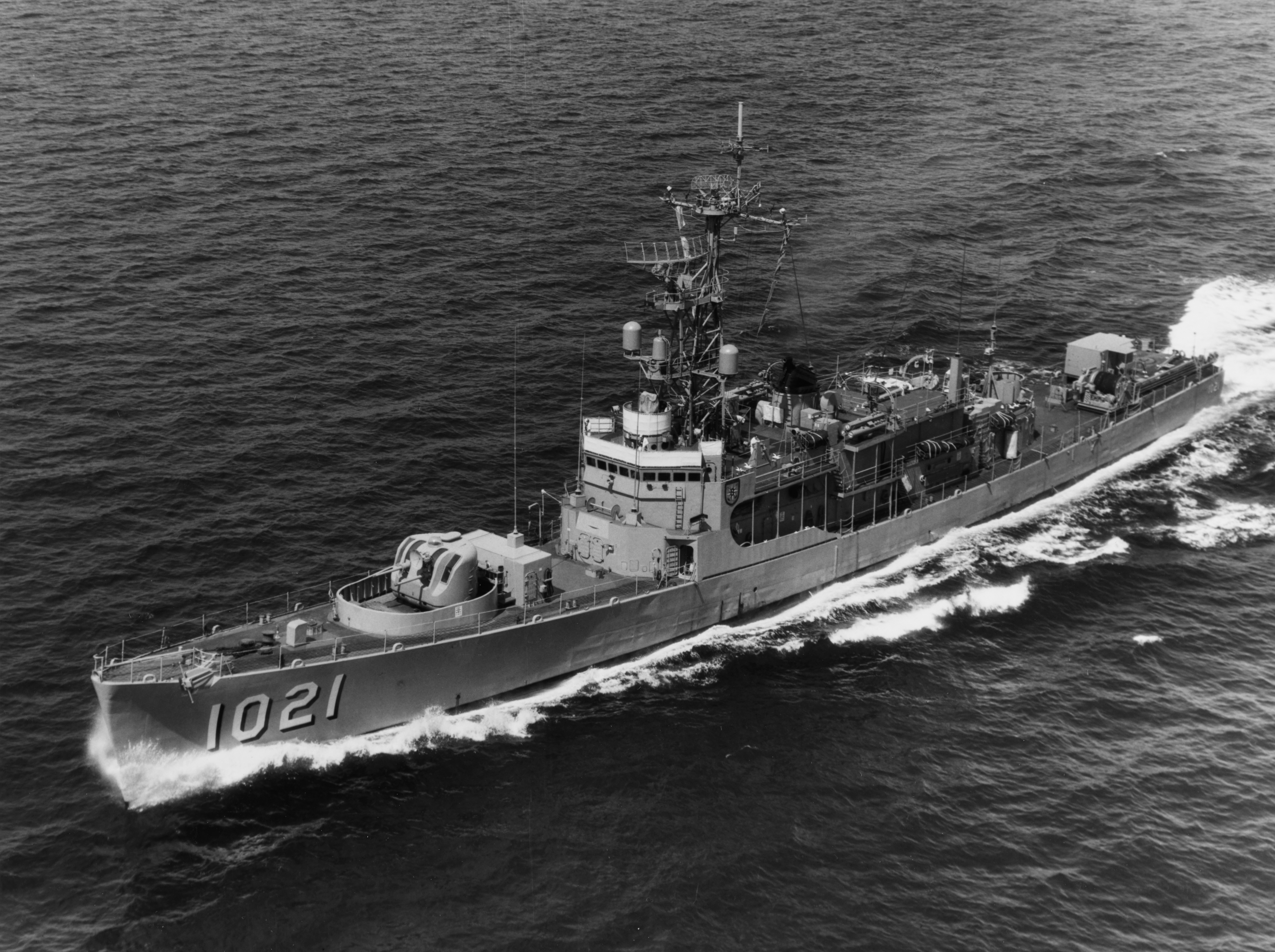

History

United States
- Name: USS Courtney
- Namesake: Henry A. Courtney, Jr.
- Builder: Defoe Shipbuilding Company
- Laid down: 2 September 1954
- Launched: 2 November 1955
- Commissioned: 24 September 1956
- Stricken: 14 December 1973
- Home port: Naval Station Newport, RI
- Fate: Sold for scrap, 17 June 1974

General characteristics
- Class & type: Dealey-class destroyer escort
- Displacement: 1,877 long tons (1,907 t) full load
- Length: 314 ft 6 in (95.86 m)
- Beam: 36 ft 9 in (11.20 m)
- Draft: 18 ft (5.5 m)
- Propulsion: 2 × Foster-Wheeler boilers; 1 × De Laval geared turbine; 20,000 shp (15 MW); 1 shaft
- Speed: 27 knots (31 mph; 50 km/h)
- Range: 6,000 nmi (11,000 km) at 12 kn (14 mph; 22 km/h)
- Complement: 170
- Armament: 4 × 3 inch/50 caliber guns; 1 × Squid ASW mortar; 6 × 324 mm (12.8 in) Mark 32 torpedo tubes; Mark 46 torpedoes

Service record
- Operations: Operation Argus

USS Courtney (DE-1021) was a Dealey-class destroyer escort of the United States Navy, in service from 1956 to 1973.

== Service history ==
Courtney was named for Marine Major Henry A. Courtney, Jr. (1916–1945), who was awarded the Medal of Honor posthumously for his heroism in the Battle of Okinawa. She was launched 2 November 1955 by Defoe Shipbuilding Company, Bay City, Mich., sponsored by Mrs. H.A. Courtney; commissioned 24 September 1956 and reported to the U.S. Atlantic Fleet.

=== 1957 ===
Joining Escort Squadron 10 (CortRon 10) at Naval Station Newport, Rhode Island, 26 April 1957, Courtney operated from that port exercising in antisubmarine warfare and convoy escort techniques in the British West Indies until 3 September. She arrived at Milford Haven, Wales, on 14 September for maneuvers with ships of other NATO navies in the Irish Sea, visiting Plymouth, England, and Brest, France, before returning to Newport 21 October 1957 to resume local operations. She took part in hunter-killer exercises off North Carolina and in convoy exercises extending into the waters off Florida.

=== 1958 to 1960 ===
Courtney sailed from Newport 1 April 1958 and called at Reykjavík, Iceland, on the way to Bodø, Norway, to conduct exercises with ships of the Royal Norwegian Navy. She put into Antwerp, Belgium, and NS Argentia, Newfoundland, and returned to Newport 14 May.

From 7 August to 30 September, she was involved in Operation Argus, conducting nuclear tests in the high atmosphere as part of Navy Task Force 88. After completion of the tests, she cruised to Rio de Janeiro, Brazil, from 15 to 19 September. Again cruising to South American waters from February through March 1959, she called at ports in Colombia, Ecuador, Peru, and Chile, and exercised with ships of the Colombian and Peruvian navies.

NATO exercises in August and September 1959 found her calling in Newfoundland, Northern Ireland, England, and Portugal. Through the first half of 1960, she cruised along the US East Coast on a variety of exercises, including an amphibious operation with Marines on the coast of North Carolina.

From August through December 1960, Courtney participated in Operation Unitas, the combined antisubmarine training cruise of the American nations.

[1960–1973]

Courtney was stricken from the Naval Vessel Register 14 December 1973. She was sold for scrapping 17 June 1974.
