= USS Hooper =

Dealey-class destroyer escort

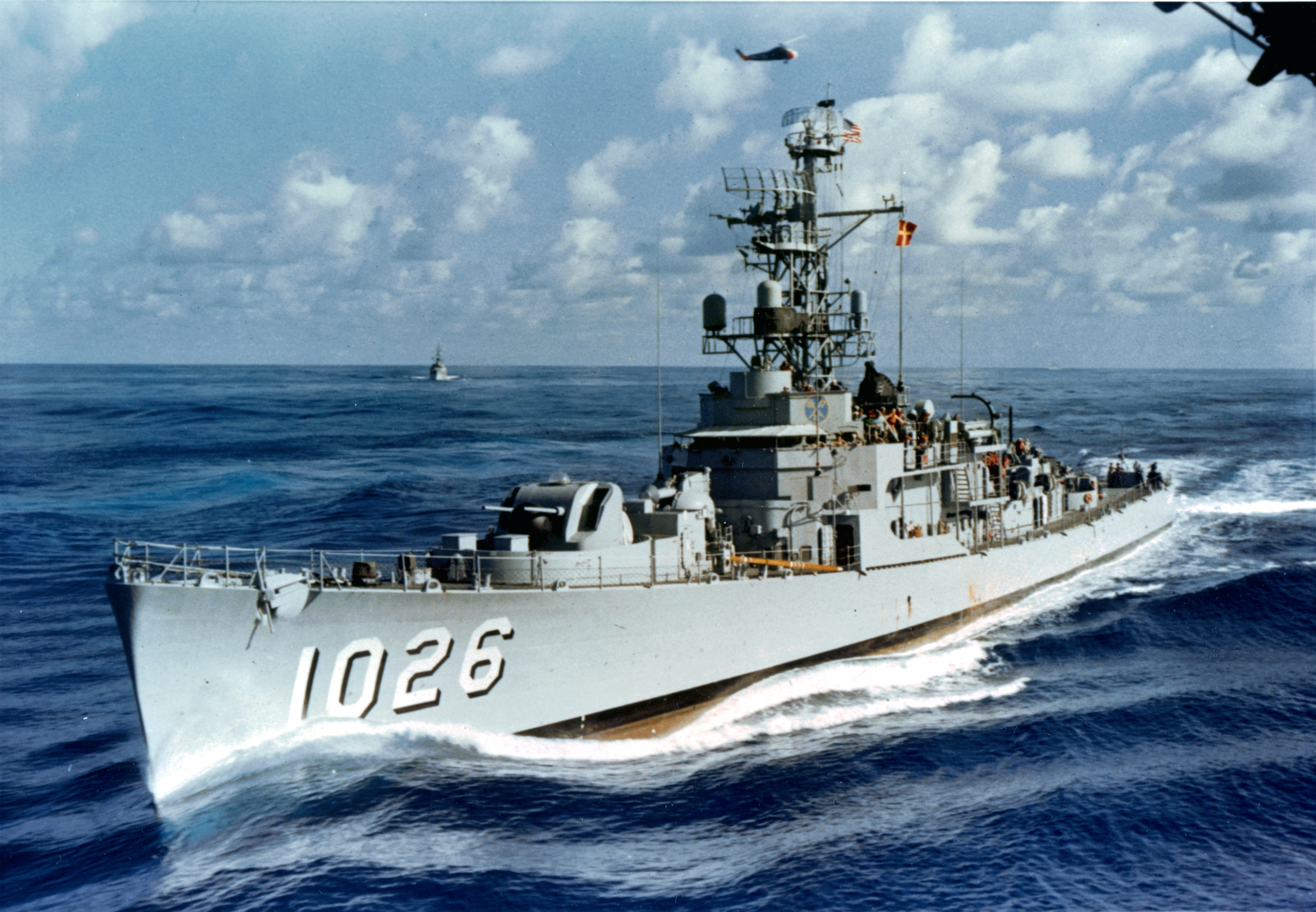
- USS Hooper (DE-1026)

History

United States
- Name: USS Hooper
- Namesake: Stanford Caldwell Hooper
- Builder: Bethlehem-Pacific Coast Steel Corp.
- Laid down: 4 January 1956
- Launched: 1 August 1957
- Commissioned: 18 March 1958
- Decommissioned: 6 June 1973
- Stricken: 6 June 1973
- Motto: Sans Peur; ("Without Fear")
- Fate: Sold for scrap

General characteristics
- Class & type: Dealey-class destroyer escort
- Displacement: 1,877 long tons (1,907 t) full load
- Length: 314 ft 6 in (95.86 m)
- Beam: 36 ft 9 in (11.20 m)
- Draft: 18 ft (5.5 m)
- Propulsion: 2 × Foster-Wheeler boilers; 1 × De Laval geared turbine; 20,000 shp (15 MW); 1 shaft
- Speed: 27 knots (31 mph; 50 km/h)
- Range: 6,000 nmi (11,000 km) at 12 kn (14 mph; 22 km/h)
- Complement: 170
- Armament: 4 × 3 inch/50 caliber guns; 1 × Squid ASW mortar or RUR-4 Weapon Alpha; 6 × 324 mm (12.8 in) Mark 32 torpedo tubes; Mark 44 and 46 torpedoes

USS Hooper (DE-1026) (originally USS Gatch) was a Dealey-class destroyer escort in the United States Navy. She was named for Rear Admiral Stanford Caldwell Hooper, prominent naval communicator (considered the founder of naval radio), and Director of Naval Communications from 1928 to 1935.

Hooper was launched by Bethlehem-Pacific Coast Steel Corp., San Francisco, 1 August 1957; sponsored by Miss Elizabeth Hooper, daughter of Rear Admiral Hooper; and commissioned at San Francisco 18 March 1958.

== Service history ==
One of a new class of fast escort vessels designed for convoy work, Hooper conducted shakedown training out of her home port, San Diego, before deploying with the 7th Fleet. The escort vessel took part in antisubmarine operations and joined the vital Formosa Patrol before returning to the United States 9 April 1959. Through 1961 she continued to operate with the 7th Fleet and in the San Diego area.

In January 1962, Hooper began a two-month assignment as school ship at San Diego for antisubmarine training. Entering the yard at Hunter's Point in March, the ship had her aft 3-inch mount replaced with a helicopter flight deck and a single 20 mm cannon to increase her versatility, and also had the newest sonar equipment installed. Returning to her regular pattern of deployments to the Far East, Hooper continued to play an important role in keeping the peace in this vital area. In addition to her regular operations, she took part in SEATO maneuvers in the spring of 1963.

After serving in Hawaiian waters, Hooper returned to the Far East in July 1964. During November Hooper patrolled the Taiwan Strait. She returned to San Diego 16 December where she conducted coastal operations through 1965.

On 6 January 1966 Hooper, along with Bridget, Evans, and Bronstein, escorted the aircraft carrier USS Yorktown to Hawaii. She then departed Pearl Harbor 7 February for Yokosuka, Japan, where she arrived 17 February. From 21 February to 18 March, she patrolled the Formosa Strait again. During the next 6 months Hooper operated off Vietnam, contributing to the safety of the government of South Vietnam. On 15 July Hooper departed Yokosuka for San Diego. En route the ship assisted in the search for a downed Royal Thailand Army DC-3 aircraft carrying Brigadier General Joseph Stilwell Jr. The search was fruitless. Arriving at San Diego 22 July, Hooper operated off the western coast of the United States for the remainder of the year and into 1967. Hooper served as a Naval Reserve ship based in the Long Beach Naval Station in 1968.

== Scrapping ==
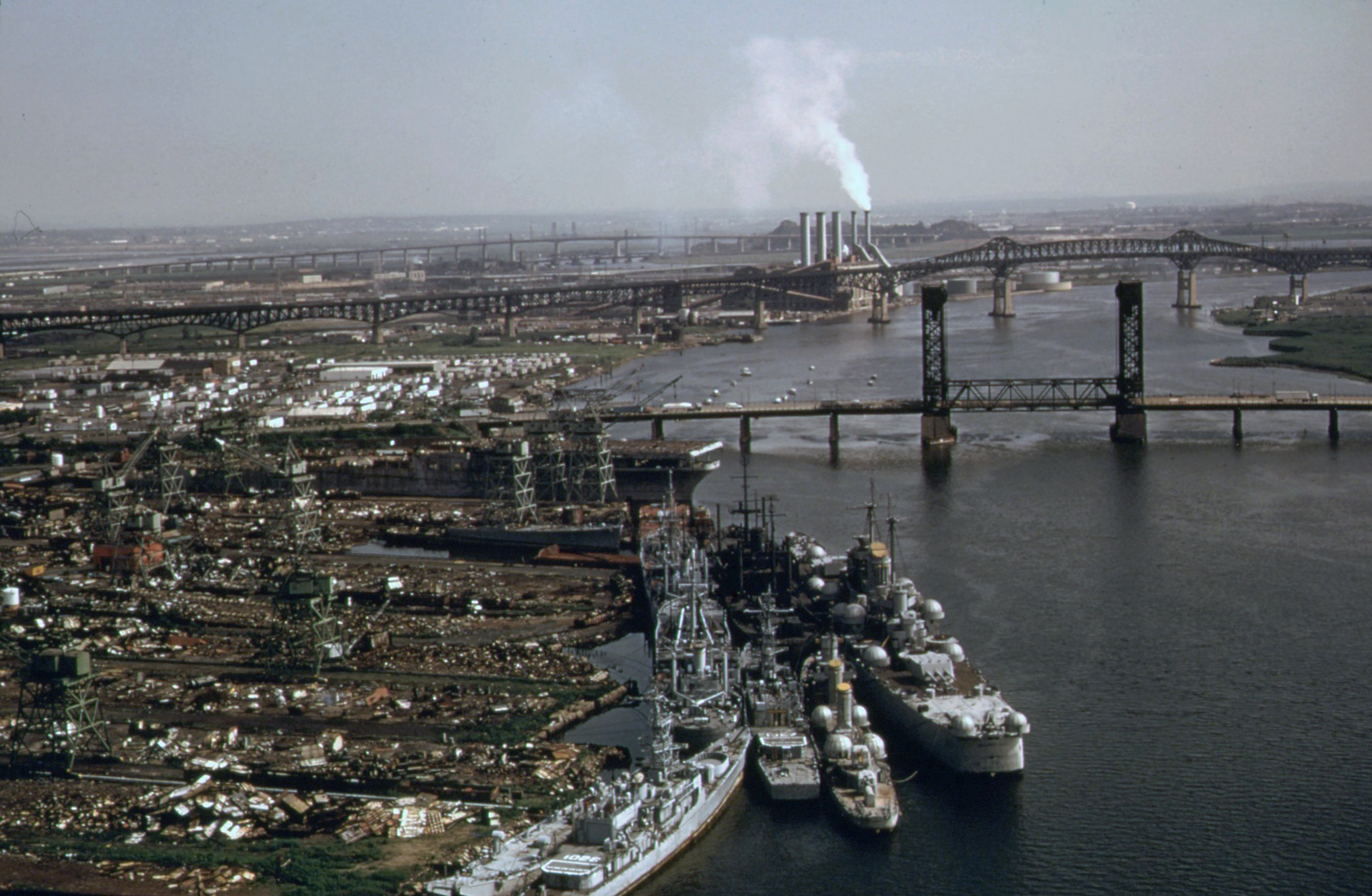
Hooper among group of ships awaiting scrapping, 1974
