= Japanese destroyer Minazuki (1926) =

Destroyer of the Imperial Japanese Navy

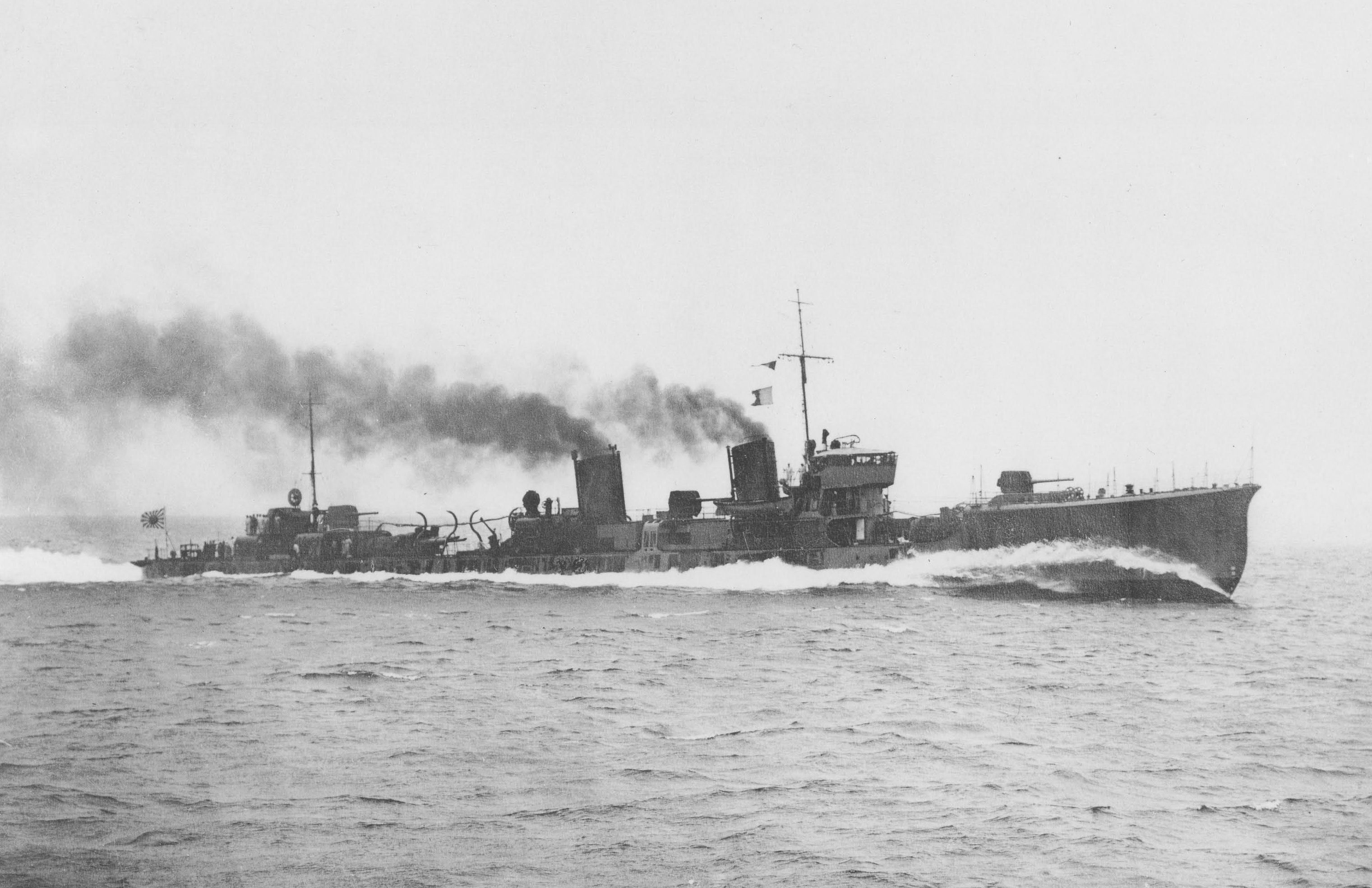
- Minazuki in February 1927

History

Empire of Japan
- Name: Minazuki
- Namesake: June
- Builder: Uraga Dock Company, Uraga
- Laid down: 24 March 1925 as Destroyer No. 28
- Launched: 25 May 1926
- Completed: 22 March 1927
- Renamed: As Minazuki, 1 August 1928
- Stricken: 10 August 1944
- Fate: Sunk on 6 June 1944

General characteristics
- Class & type: Mutsuki-class destroyer
- Displacement: 1,336 t (1,315 long tons) (normal); 1,800 t (1,772 long tons) (deep load)
- Length: 97.54 m (320 ft 0 in) (pp); 102.4 m (335 ft 11 in) (o/a)
- Beam: 9.16 m (30 ft 1 in)
- Draft: 2.96 m (9 ft 9 in)
- Installed power: 38,500 shp (28,700 kW); 4 × Kampon water-tube boilers
- Propulsion: 2 shafts; 2 × Kampon geared steam turbines
- Speed: 37.25 knots (68.99 km/h; 42.87 mph)
- Range: 4,000 nmi (7,400 km; 4,600 mi) at 15 knots (28 km/h; 17 mph)
- Complement: 150
- Armament: 4 × 12 cm (4.7 in) Type 3 guns; 2 × triple 61 cm (24 in) torpedo tubes; 18 × depth charges; 16 × mines

Service record
- Part of: Destroyer Division 30
- Operations: Battle of the Philippines; Solomon Islands campaign; New Guinea campaign

Minazuki (水無月, "June") was one of twelve Mutsuki-class destroyers, built for the Imperial Japanese Navy (IJN) during the 1920s. During the Pacific War, she participated in the Philippines Campaign in December 1941 and the Dutch East Indies Campaign in early 1942. In March, she was assigned to convoy escort duties in and around Malaya and the Dutch East Indies until she was transferred to Rabaul in early 1943 to ferry troops around New Guinea and the Solomon Islands.

== Design and description ==
The Mutsuki class was an improved version of the Kamikaze-class destroyers and was the first with triple 61-centimeter (24 in) torpedo tubes. The ships had an overall length of 102.4 meters (335 ft 11 in) and were 94.54 meters (310 ft 2 in) between perpendiculars. They had a beam of 9.16 meters (30 ft 1 in), and a mean draft of 2.96 meters (9 ft 9 in). The Mutsuki-class ships displaced 1,336 metric tons (1,315 long tons) at standard load and 1,800 metric tons (1,772 long tons) at deep load. They were powered by two Parsons geared steam turbines, each driving one propeller shaft, using steam provided by four Kampon water-tube boilers. The turbines were designed to produce 38,500 shaft horsepower (28,700 kW), which would propel the ships at 37.25 knots (68.99 km/h; 42.87 mph). The ships carried 420 metric tons (413 long tons) of fuel oil which gave them a range of 4,000 nautical miles (7,400 km; 4,600 mi) at 15 knots (28 km/h; 17 mph). Their crew consisted of 150 officers and crewmen.

The main armament of the Mutsuki-class ships consisted of four 12-centimeter (4.7 in) Type 3 guns in single mounts; one gun forward of the superstructure, one between the two funnels and the last pair back to back atop the aft superstructure. The guns were numbered '1' to '4' from front to rear. The ships carried two above-water triple sets of 61-centimeter torpedo tubes; one mount was between the forward superstructure and the forward gun and the other was between the aft funnel and aft superstructure. Four reload torpedoes were provided for the tubes. They carried 18 depth charges and could also carry 16 mines. They could also be fitted with minesweeping gear.

Minazuki was one of six Mutsuki-class ships reconstructed in 1935–36, with their hulls strengthened, raked caps fitted to the funnels and shields to the torpedo mounts. In 1941–42, most of those ships were converted into fast transports with No. 2 and No. 3 guns removed. In addition, ten license-built 25 mm (1.0 in) Type 96 light AA guns and at least two 13.2 mm (0.5 in) Type 93 anti-aircraft machineguns were installed. The minesweeping gear was replaced by four depth charge throwers and the ships now carried a total of 36 depth charges. These changes reduced their speed to 34 knots (63 km/h; 39 mph) and increased their displacement to 1,944 metric tons (1,913 long tons) at normal load. Three more 25 mm guns were added in 1942–43.

== Construction and career ==
Minazuki laid down by the Uraga Dock Company at its shipyard in Uraga on 24 March 1924, launched on 25 May 1926 and completed on 22 March 1927. Originally commissioned simply as Destroyer No. 28, the ship was assigned the name Minazuki on 1 August 1928.

=== Pacific War ===
At the time of the attack on Pearl Harbor on 7 December 1941, Minazuki was assigned to Destroyer Division 22 under Destroyer Squadron 5 of the 3rd Fleet. She sortied from the Mako Guard District in the Pescadores as part of the Japanese invasion force for Operation M (the invasion of the Philippines), during which time the destroyer helped screen landings of Japanese forces at Lingayen Gulf and at Aparri.

In early 1942, Minazuki was assigned to escorting troop convoys from French Indochina for Operation E (the invasion of Malaya) and Operation J (the invasion of Java, Netherlands East Indies), in February. From 10 March 1942 Minazuki was reassigned to the Southwest Area Fleet and escorted troop convoys from Singapore around the occupied Netherlands East Indies. She returned to Sasebo Naval Arsenal for repairs on 18 August, and rejoined the fleet on 4 October, continuing escort duties.

Minazuki was assigned to the 8th Fleet at Rabaul on 25 February 1943, and for the remainder of the year was deployed on numerous "Tokyo Express" troop transport missions throughout the Solomons Islands. She landed troops during the Battle of Kolombangara (12 July), but did not see combat, and suffered minor damage from an air attack near Shortlands, which provided an excuse to withdraw to Kure Naval Arsenal from August through September for repairs. By 13 September, Minazuki was back at Rabaul, and from 28 September was evacuating Japanese troops from Kolombangara. During a second run on 2 October, Minazuki engaged three US destroyers, and was hit by three shells, all of which were duds. Damage caused by a near miss in an air raid temporary disabled her No. 1 and No. 2 guns on 12 October, but Minazuki continued to make "Tokyo Express" runs to Buka and Kavieng, New Ireland through the end of the year. On 4 November, Minazuki rescued 267 survivors of the damaged transport Kiyozumi Maru.

After repairs at the end of the year, Minazuki resumed "Tokyo Express" transport missions to Rabaul to the end of February, and was assigned patrols based out of Palau in March and April. From 1 May, Minazuki was reassigned to the Central Pacific Area Fleet. She escorted troop convoys from Yokosuka to Saipan in May.

On 6 June, after departing Tawitawi with a tanker convoy to Balikpapan on Borneo, Minazuki was torpedoed by the submarine USS Harder off Tawitawi 04°05′N 119°30′E. The destroyer Wakatsuki rescued 45 survivors, but Minazuki's captain, Lieutenant Kieji Isobe, was not among them. The ship was struck from the Navy List on 10 August 1944.
