= Henry A. Courtney Jr. =

Henry Alexius Courtney Jr.
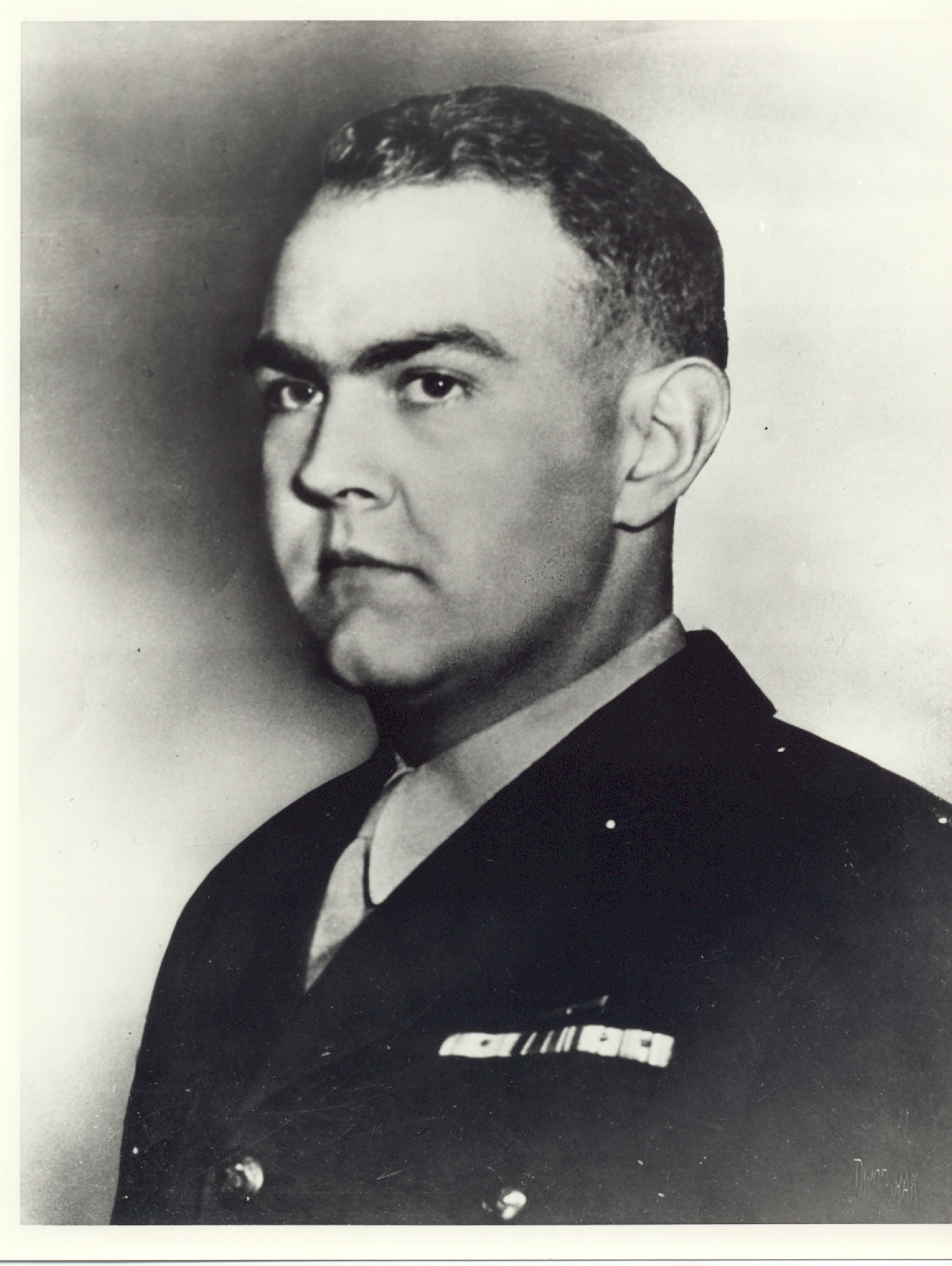
- Henry A. Courtney Jr., Medal of Honor recipient
- Born: January 6, 1916; Duluth, Minnesota, US
- Died: May 15, 1945 (aged 29); Okinawa, Japan
- Burial place: initially the 6th Marine Division Cemetery on Okinawa later Calvary Cemetery, in Duluth, Minnesota
- Military career
- Allegiance: United States of America
- Branch: United States Marine Corps
- Service years: 1940–1945
- Rank: Major
- Unit: 22nd Marine Regiment
- Conflicts: World War II: Guadalcanal campaign; Battle of Okinawa †
- Awards: Medal of Honor; Purple Heart

Henry Alexius Courtney Jr. (January 6, 1916 – May 15, 1945) was an officer of the United States Marine Corps Reserve during World War II and a posthumous recipient of the Medal of Honor.

== Biography ==
Courtney was born January 6, 1916, in Duluth, Minnesota. He received his bachelor's degree from the University of Minnesota and his law degree from Loyola University Law School in Chicago. He was admitted to practice law in Illinois and Minnesota in 1940, shortly after joining his father's law firm in Duluth.

He received his commission as a second lieutenant in the Marine Corps Reserve in February 1940 and in March of that year was placed in command of the Duluth unit of the Marine Corps Reserve, which was mobilized and sent to San Diego for training. He then served in Iceland for ten months.

At Guadalcanal, Solomon Islands, he participated in the first United States offensive of World War II, commanding a company of the 1st Marine Division.

His next combat action was the Battle of Okinawa, for which he was posthumously awarded the Medal of Honor. While serving as executive officer of the Second Battalion of the 22nd Marines, 6th Marine Division on Okinawa, he was killed in action after exhibiting great courage and self-sacrifice leading a successful night attack against enemy positions on Sugar Loaf Hill 14 – May 15, 1945. He was also posthumously awarded the Purple Heart and Gold Star in lieu of a second Purple Heart for wounds received in that campaign.

The Medal of Honor was presented to his parents, Mr. and Mrs. Henry A. Courtney, Sr., of Duluth on December 30, 1947, by Commandant of the Marine Corps General Alexander A. Vandegrift. Major Courtney's remains were initially buried in the 6th Marine Division Cemetery on Okinawa. In 1948 his remains were re-interred in Calvary Cemetery in Duluth. Major Courtney's Medal of Honor is on display at the Veterans' Memorial Hall (Duluth, Minnesota); a program of the St. Louis County Historical Society.

== Namesake ==
In 1955, the destroyer escort USS Courtney (DE-1021) was named after him. Marine Corps Base Camp Courtney on Okinawa, Courtney's place of death, is also named in his honor.

Brick from Korean War Veterans Memorial

Korean War Veterans Memorial

Korean War Veterans Memorial

== Medal of Honor citation ==
The President of the United States takes pride in presenting the MEDAL OF HONOR posthumously to

MAJOR HENRY A. COURTNEY, JR.
UNITED STATES MARINE CORPS RESERVE

for service as set forth in the following CITATION:

For conspicuous gallantry and intrepidity at the risk of his life above and beyond the call of duty as Executive Officer of the Second Battalion, Twenty-Second Marines, Sixth Marine Division, in action against enemy Japanese forces on Okinawa Shima in the Ryukyu Islands, 14 and 15 May 1945. Ordered to hold for the night in static defense behind Sugar Loaf Hill after leading the forward elements of his command in a prolonged fire fight, Major Courtney weighed the effect of a hostile night counterattack against the tactical value of an immediate Marine assault, resolved to initiate the assault, and promptly obtained permission to advance and seize the forward slope of the hill. Quickly explaining the situation to his small remaining force, he declared his personal intention of moving forward and then proceeded on his way, boldly blasting near-by cave positions and neutralizing enemy guns as he went. Inspired by his courage, every man followed without hesitation, and together the intrepid Marines braved a terrific concentration of Japanese gunfire to skirt the hill on the right and reach the reverse slope. Temporarily halting, Major Courtney sent guides to the rear for more ammunition and possible replacements. subsequently reinforced by twenty-six men and a LVT load of grenades, he determined to storm the crest of the hill and crush any planned counterattack before it could gain sufficient momentum to effect a break-through. Leading his men by example rather than by command, he pushed ahead with unrelenting aggressiveness, hurling grenades into cave openings on the slope with devastating effect. Upon reaching the crest and observing large numbers of Japanese forming for action less than one hundred yards away, he instantly attacked, waged a furious battle and succeeded in killing many of the enemy and in forcing the remainder to cover in the caves. Determined to hold, he ordered his men to dig in and, coolly disregarding the continuous hail of flying enemy shrapnel to rally his weary troops, tirelessly aided casualties and assigned his men to more advantageous positions. Although instantly killed by mortar burst while moving among his men, Major Courtney, by his astute military acumen, indomitable leadership and decisive action in the face of overwhelming odds, had contributed essentially to the success of the Okinawa Campaign and his great personal valor throughout sustained and enhanced the highest traditions of the United States Naval Service. He gallantly gave his life for his country.

/S/ HARRY S. TRUMAN

== See also ==
- List of Medal of Honor recipients for World War II
