= Veterans' Memorial Hall (Richmond, New Hampshire) =

- U.S. National Register of Historic Places
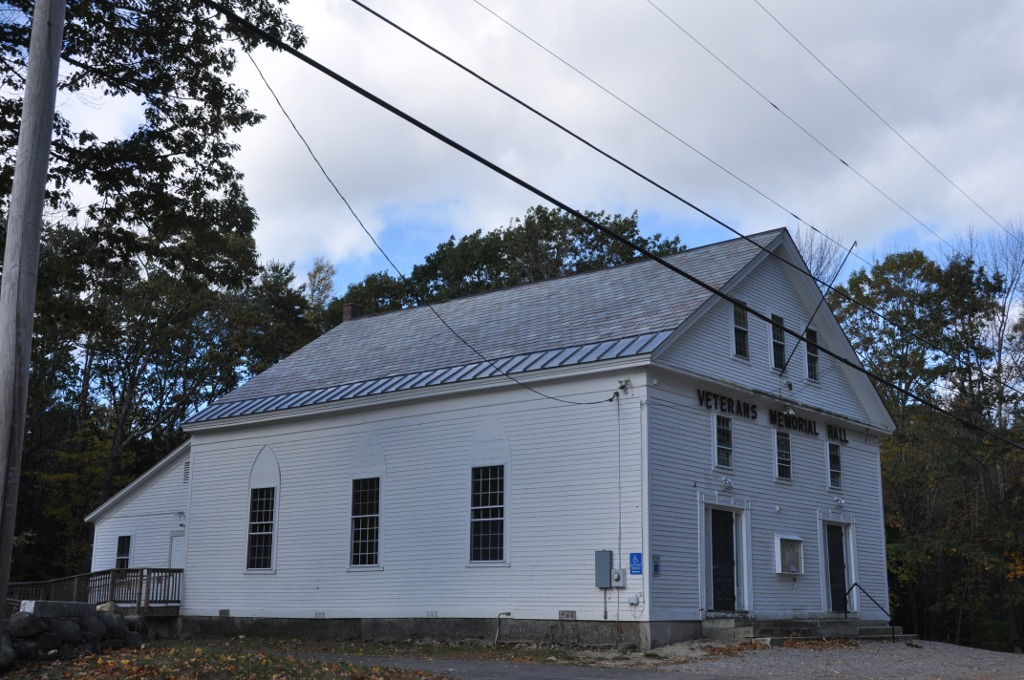

- Location within New Hampshire Location within the United States
- Location: NH 32, Richmond, New Hampshire
- Coordinates: 42°45′53″N 72°16′9″W
- Area: 0.2 acres (0.081 ha)
- Built: 1837
- Architect: Starkey, Oren
- NRHP reference No.: 86002160
- Added to NRHP: September 4, 1986

The Veterans' Memorial Hall, formerly the First Universalist Society Meeting House, is a historic community building on New Hampshire Route 32 in Richmond, New Hampshire. The 1 1/2-story clapboarded wood-frame building was built in 1837 by members of the local Universalist congregation. Richmond was the birthplace of Hosea Ballou, a theologian influential in the development of Universalism; he left the town before this building was built. As originally built, the meeting house had a small tower and belfry, which were removed in 1892 when the building was acquired by the local Grange. The building has seen only modest external alterations since then; the interior has had most of its religious trappings removed, but is also otherwise little altered.

The building was listed on the National Register of Historic Places in 1986. It is now owned by the town.

== See also ==
- National Register of Historic Places listings in Cheshire County, New Hampshire
