= Dealey-class destroyer escort =

Class of American destroyer escorts

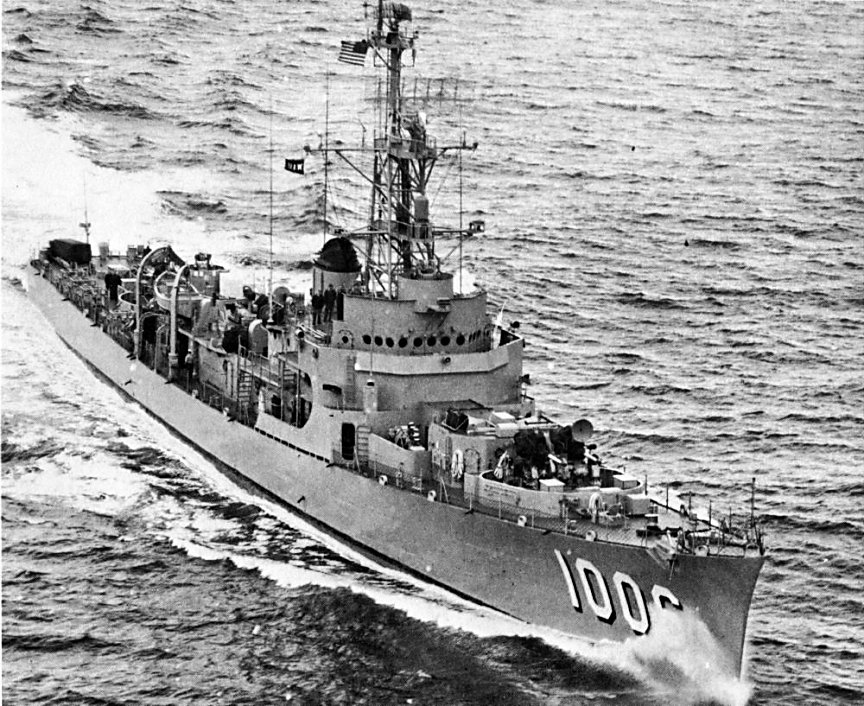
- USS Dealey (DE-1006)

Class overview
- Builders: New York Shipbuilding, NJ (4); Bath Iron Works, ME (3); Defoe Shipbuilding, MI (2); Puget Sound Bridge , WA (2); Bethlehem; Alameda Shipyard, CA (2)
- Operators: United States Navy; National Navy of Uruguay; Colombian National Navy
- Preceded by: John C. Butler class
- Succeeded by: Claud Jones class
- Subclasses: Oslo class; Admiral Pereira da Silva class
- Built: 1952–1957
- In commission: 1954–1994
- Completed: 13
- Preserved: 1 (possibly, though doubtful)

General characteristics
- Type: Destroyer escort
- Displacement: 1,314 long tons (1,335 t) light, 1,877 long tons (1,907 t) full load
- Length: 314 ft 6 in (95.86 m)
- Beam: 36 ft 9 in (11.20 m)
- Draft: 18 ft (5.5 m)
- Propulsion: 2 × Foster-Wheeler boilers; 1 × De Laval geared turbine; 20,000 shp (15 MW); 1 shaft
- Speed: 25 knots (29 mph; 46 km/h)
- Complement: 170
- Sensors & processing systems: Mark 63 fire-control system
- Armament: 4 × 3-inch/50 caliber guns; 4 × 21-inch (533 mm) torpedo tubes; 2 × ASW torpedo racks; 2 × Hedgehog anti-submarine mortar; 2 × DCT (K-guns)

The Dealey-class destroyer escorts were the first post-World War II escort ships built for the United States Navy.

Slightly faster and larger than the escort destroyers they succeeded, the Dealey class were fitted with twin-mounted 3-inch (76 mm) guns, anti-submarine (ASW) rockets, a depth charge rack and six depth charge launchers. There were later modernizations that removed the ASW rockets and the depth charges in favor of nuclear-capable anti-submarine rocket launchers and torpedo mounts which fired lighter homing torpedoes. A large SQS 23 sonar was refitted in a bow sonar dome and most of the class were also fitted with a hangar and landing pad for DASH drone helicopters to deliver MK 44 and Mk 46 torpedoes. The drone helicopters proved very unreliable and their failure contributed to the relatively short life of the class.

They were decommissioned in 1972 and 1973 in favor of the Knox-class frigate. Dealey and Hartley were sold at surplus to other countries in 1972, with the remainder of the class being sold for scrap.

== Development and design ==
In the late 1940s, the US Navy developed a requirement for a replacement for the PC-461-class submarine chaser in the coastal convoy escort and patrol roles. The existing submarine chasers were considered too small to carry the required anti-submarine weapons and sensors, and too slow to catch modern submarines, with a ship the size of existing destroyer escorts required. The ships would need to be cheap and quick to build, as large numbers would be required in the event of a war. By 1950, the requirement had changed to an "Ocean Escort" with a speed of at least 25 knots (46 km/h; 29 mph) at full load and an endurance of 6,000 nautical miles (11,000 km; 6,900 mi) at 12 knots (22 km/h; 14 mph). An ahead-throwing anti-submarine weapon, at first planned to be the Mark 17, a large, trainable Hedgehog anti-submarine spigot mortar, would be fitted.

The final design, SCB 72, or the Dealey or DE-1006 class, was 315 feet (96.0 m) long overall and 308 feet (93.9 m) at the waterline, with a beam of 36 feet 8 inches (11.18 m) and a draft of 11 feet 10 inches (3.61 m). Displacement was 1,314 long tons (1,335 t) light and 1,877 long tons (1,907 t) full load. 2 Foster-Wheeler boilers fed steam to a geared steam turbine, which drove a single propeller shaft. The machinery was rated at 20,000 shaft horsepower (15,000 kW) which gave a design speed of 27 knots (50 km/h; 31 mph). (Note: Dealey reached a speed of 27.58 knots (51.08 km/h; 31.74 mph) during sea trials.) A single-shaft machinery layout was chosen to ease mass production, avoiding potential bottlenecks in gear-cutting which had delayed production of wartime destroyer escorts.

As built, the ships had a gun armament of two twin 3-inch (76 mm)/50 calibre guns, mounted fore and aft. These were open, manually trained dual-purpose mounts which could be used against both surface and anti-aircraft targets. The Mark 17 Hedgehog was cancelled before the ships were built, so in its place two British Squid anti-submarine mortars were fitted ahead of the ship's bridge in Dealey, with a RUR-4 Weapon Alpha anti-submarine rocket launcher fitted in the remaining ships of the class. Launchers for anti-submarine torpedoes were fitted, and depth charge throwers were fitted on the ships' fantail. Sensors included the SPS-6 air-search radar and the SQS-4 low-frequency sonar.

The prototype ship, Dealey, was built under the Fiscal year (FY) 1952 shipbuilding program, with two ordered in both the FY 1953 and 1954 programs and eight in the 1955 program. Production was stopped at 13 because the Dealey class was considered too expensive at $12 million for mass production. This resulted in the smaller, diesel-powered Claud Jones class being built. The Dealey design formed the basis for the Norwegian Oslo-class and Portuguese Admiral Pereira da Silva-class frigates.

=== Modifications ===
All of the class except Dealey, Cromwell and Courtney were upgraded in the 1960s by adding facilities for the DASH drone helicopter, with a hangar and helicopter deck replacing the aft 3-inch gun mount and the longer-ranged SQS-23 sonar replaced the SQS-4. The three unmodified ships were fitted with a Variable Depth Sonar (VDS). All ships had their Squid or Weapon Alpha launchers removed late in their US Navy career, while Mark 32 torpedo tubes for Mark 44 or Mark 46 anti-submarine torpedoes were fitted.

== Ships ==
Name	Number	Builder	Laid down	Launched	Commissioned	Fate
Dealey	DE-1006	Bath Iron Works	15 December 1952	8 November 1953	3 June 1954	Transferred to Uruguay as ROU 18 De Julio (DE-3)
Cromwell	DE-1014	Bath Iron Works	3 August 1953	4 June 1954	24 November 1954	Stricken 5 July 1972
Hammerberg	DE-1015	Bath Iron Works	12 November 1953	20 August 1954	2 March 1955	Stricken 14 December 1973
Courtney	DE-1021	Defoe Shipbuilding	2 September 1954	2 November 1955	24 September 1956	Stricken 1973
Lester	DE-1022	Defoe Shipbuilding	2 September 1954	5 January 1956	14 June 1957	Stricken 1973
Evans	DE-1023	Puget Sound Bridge and Dredging	8 April 1955	14 September 1955	14 June 1957	Stricken 1973
Bridget	DE-1024	Puget Sound Bridge and Dredging	19 September 1955	25 April 1956	24 October 1957	Stricken 1973
Bauer	DE-1025	Bethlehem Steel, Alameda Shipyard	1 December 1955	4 June 1957	21 November 1957	Stricken 1973
Hooper	DE-1026	Bethlehem Steel, Alameda Shipyard	4 January 1956	1 August 1957	18 March 1958	Stricken 1973
John Willis	DE-1027	New York Shipbuilding	5 July 1955	4 February 1956	21 February 1957	Stricken 1972
Van Voorhis	DE-1028	New York Shipbuilding	29 August 1955	28 July 1956	22 April 1957	Stricken 1972
Hartley	DE-1029	New York Shipbuilding	31 October 1955	24 November 1956	26 June 1957	Sold to Colombia as ARC Boyaca (DE-16) 1972, Preservation in Colombia planned, but reportedly cancelled
Joseph K. Taussig	DE-1030	New York Shipbuilding	3 January 1956	3 January 1957	10 September 1957	Stricken 1972
