= USS Harder (SS-257) =

Submarine of the United States

Coordinates: 15°50′N 119°43′E

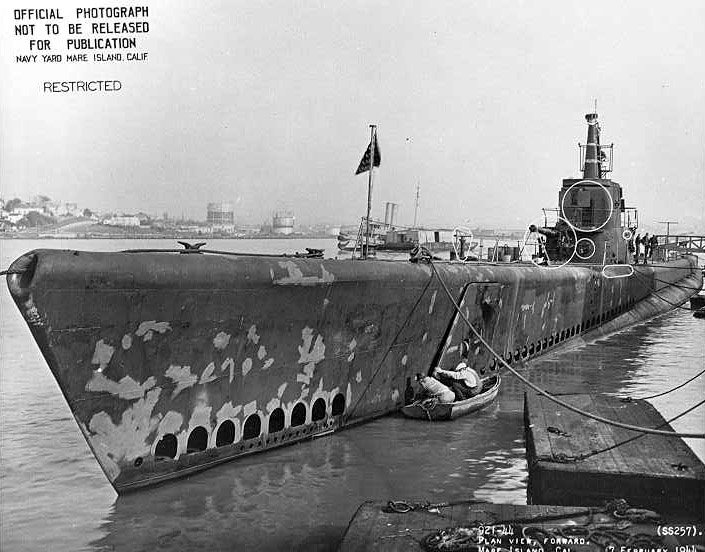
- USS Harder (SS-257)

History

United States
- Builder: Electric Boat Company, Groton, Connecticut
- Laid down: 1 December 1941
- Launched: 19 August 1942
- Sponsored by: Miss Helen M. Shaforth
- Commissioned: 2 December 1942
- Fate: Sunk by enemy vessels off Dasol Bay, Luzon, 24 August 1944

General characteristics
- Class & type: Gato-class diesel-electric submarine
- Displacement: 1,525 long tons (1,549 t) surfaced; 2,424 long tons (2,463 t) submerged
- Length: 311 ft 9 in (95.02 m)
- Beam: 27 ft 3 in (8.31 m)
- Draft: 17 ft 0 in (5.18 m) maximum
- Propulsion: 4 × Hooven-Owens-Rentschler (H.O.R.) diesel engines driving electrical generators; 2 × 126-cell Sargo batteries; 4 × high-speed Allis-Chalmers electric motors with reduction gears; two propellers; 5,400 shp (4.0 MW) surfaced; 2,740 shp (2.0 MW) submerged
- Speed: 21 kn (39 km/h) surfaced; 9 knots (17 km/h) submerged
- Range: 11,000 nmi (20,000 km) surfaced at 10 kn (19 km/h)
- Endurance: 48 hours at 2 knots (4 km/h) submerged; 75 days on patrol
- Test depth: 300 ft (90 m)
- Complement: 6 officers, 54 enlisted
- Armament: 10 × 21-inch (533 mm) torpedo tubes; 6 forward, 4 aft; 24 torpedoes; 1 × 3-inch (76 mm) / 50 caliber deck gun; Bofors 40 mm and Oerlikon 20 mm cannon

USS Harder (SS-257), a Gato-class submarine, was the first vessel of the United States Navy to be named for the harder. One of the most famous submarines of World War II, she received the Presidential Unit Citation. Her commanding officer throughout her service, the resolute and resourceful Commander Samuel D. Dealey (1906–1944), "a submariner's submariner", was posthumously awarded the Medal of Honor, as well as four Navy Crosses during his lifetime.

== Construction and commissioning ==
Harder's keel was laid down by the Electric Boat Company in Groton, Connecticut, on 1 December 1941. She was launched on 19 August 1942, sponsored by Miss Helen M. Shafroth, daughter of Rear Admiral John F. Shafroth Jr., and commissioned on 2 December 1942.

== Operational history ==
Harder performed shakedown off the United States East Coast, then headed for Pearl Harbor, Hawaii, via the Panama Canal. While crossing the Caribbean Sea on the surface in a designated safety lane on 2 May 1943, she sighted an approaching U.S. Navy PBY Catalina flying boat at a range of 5,000 yards (4,600 m). She flashed that day′s recognition signal at the PBY, which responded by opening machine-gun fire along Harder′s starboard side. As Harder crash-dived and made a hard turn to port, the PBY dropped two bombs, the first of which shook Harder. Harder was able to continue her voyage to Pearl Harbor.

=== First war patrol ===
After a short stay at Pearl Harbor, Harder departed on her first war patrol on 7 June 1943. Cruising off the coast of Japan, the submarine worked her way inside a picket line and sighted her first target on 22 June. She made a radar approach on the surface and fired four torpedoes at the two-ship convoy, hitting the seaplane transport (7,189 BRT) (which was beached to prevent sinking, but later destroyed). Harder returned to Midway on 7 July.

=== Second war patrol ===
Harder began her second war patrol 24 August 1943 from Pearl Harbor, and after touching at Midway Island, she again headed for the Japanese coast. While patrolling off Honshū on 9 September, she attacked and sank Koyo Maru and later that night ran by an escort ship at a range of 1,200 yards (1,100 m) without being detected. Two days later, the boat encountered a convoy. After running ahead to improve her firing position, she sank the cargo ship Yoko Maru with a spread of three torpedoes. Continuing her patrol, Harder sighted two more ships on 13 September, but was forced down by enemy planes while firing torpedoes. Escorts then kept the submarine down with a severe depth-charge attack that lasted over two days and almost exhausted her batteries. After evading the Japanese ships, Harder detected her next target on 19 September; a torpedo sent Kachisan Maru to the bottom almost immediately. Though running in bad weather, Harder continued to find targets. On 23 September, she sank the 4,500-ton freighter Kowa Maru and the 5,800-ton tanker Daishin Maru, off Nagoya Bay. Her torpedoes expended, Harder turned eastward on 28 September. After shooting up two armed trawlers on 29 September, she stopped at Midway on 4 October and arrived at Pearl Harbor four days later.

=== Third war patrol ===
For her third war patrol, Harder teamed with Snook and Pargo to form a coordinated, hence more effective, attack group known as a wolfpack. Departing on 30 October 1943 for the Mariana Islands, Harder encountered a target on 12 November. Promptly dispatching this one, she surfaced and sighted a trawler escort damaged by the explosion of one of her depth charges. Submerging again until sunset, the submarine then surfaced under the cover of darkness and sank the damaged ship with gunfire, then turned toward Saipan in search of new targets. Sighting three maru (merchant) ships on 19 November, she radioed her companion vessels and closed for an attack. After passing close by an escorting destroyer, Harder fired six torpedoes at two of the cargo ships, sinking Udo Maru. As depth charges began to fall, she pressed the attack; two more torpedoes finished Hokko Maru. Harder climbed to periscope depth after nightfall to finish off the third maru, the 6,000-ton Nikkō Maru. Shortly before midnight, she fired several more torpedoes at the ship, but the Japanese ship stubbornly refused to sink. A doomed, enemy crew kept the cargo ship afloat until Harder had expended all torpedoes, many of which ran erratically. Rough weather the next day finally sank the damaged target. Harder returned to Pearl Harbor on 30 November, then sailed to the Mare Island Naval Shipyard for overhaul.

=== Fourth war patrol ===
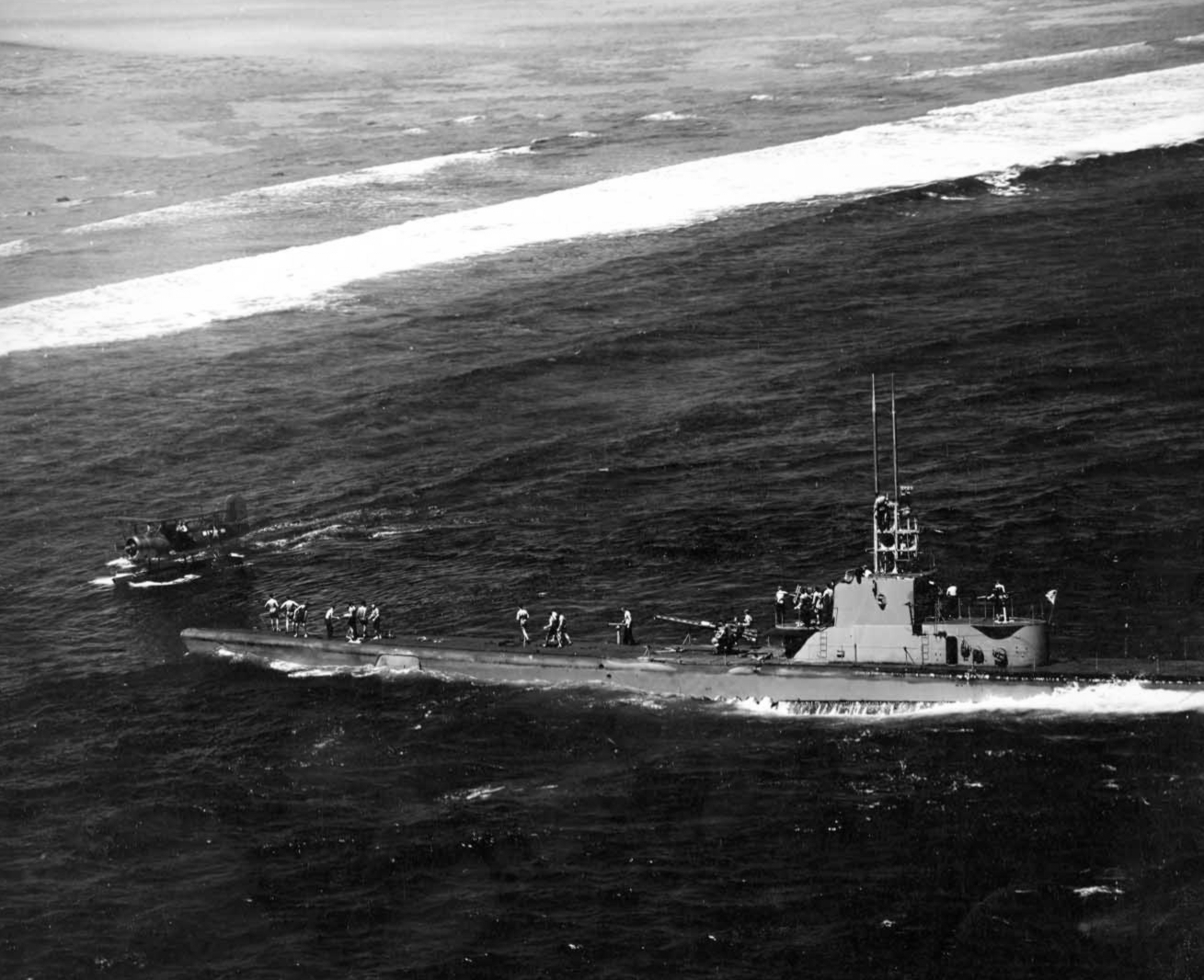
Harder rescuing VF-8 pilot ENS John R. Galvin off Woleai, 1 April 1944

Returning to action in the Pacific, Harder reached Pearl Harbor on 27 February 1944 and departed on her fourth war patrol on 16 March in company with Seahorse.

She headed for the western Caroline Islands, where she was assigned duty as a lifeguard ship for downed aviators. During American air strikes against Woleai on 1 April, Harder received word of an injured pilot awaiting rescue from the beach of a small, enemy-held island west of Woleai. Protected by air cover, she nosed against a reef, maintained her position with both propellers, and sent a boat ashore through breaking surf. Despite Japanese snipers, boiling shoals, and the precarious position of the submarine, the daring rescue succeeded, and the intrepid submarine returned to the open sea.

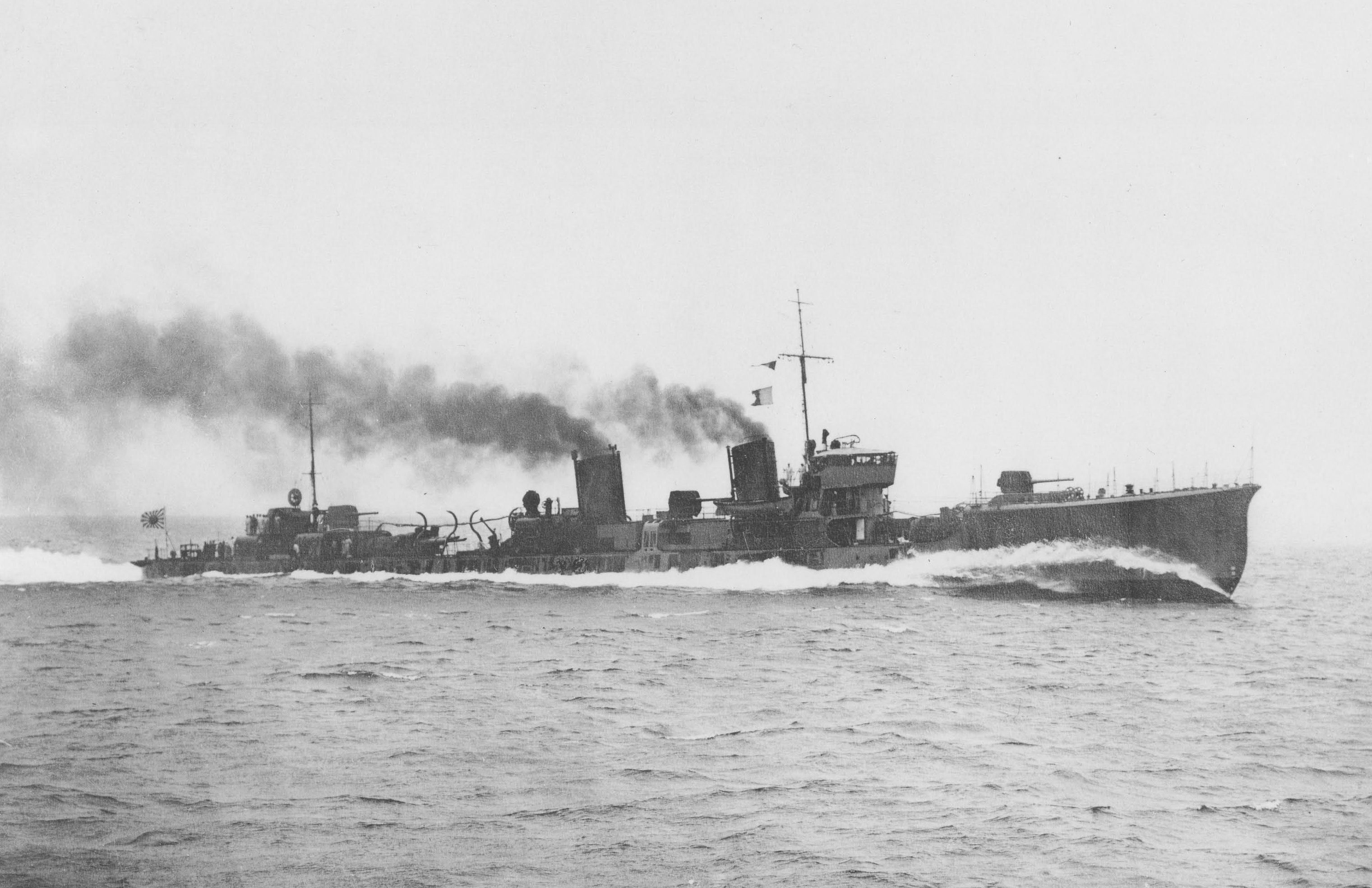
Minazuki in 1927

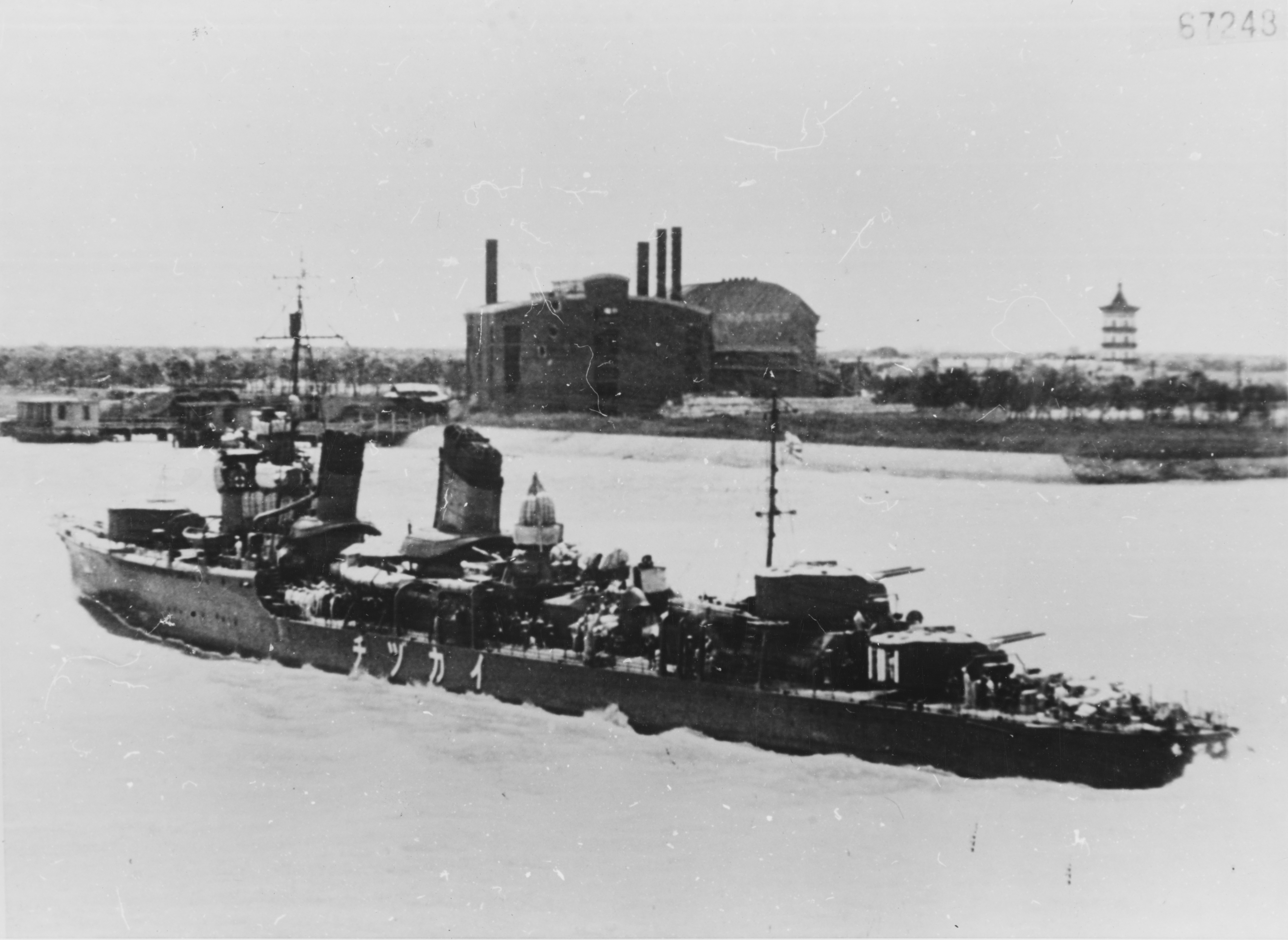
Ikazuchi underway off China in 1938

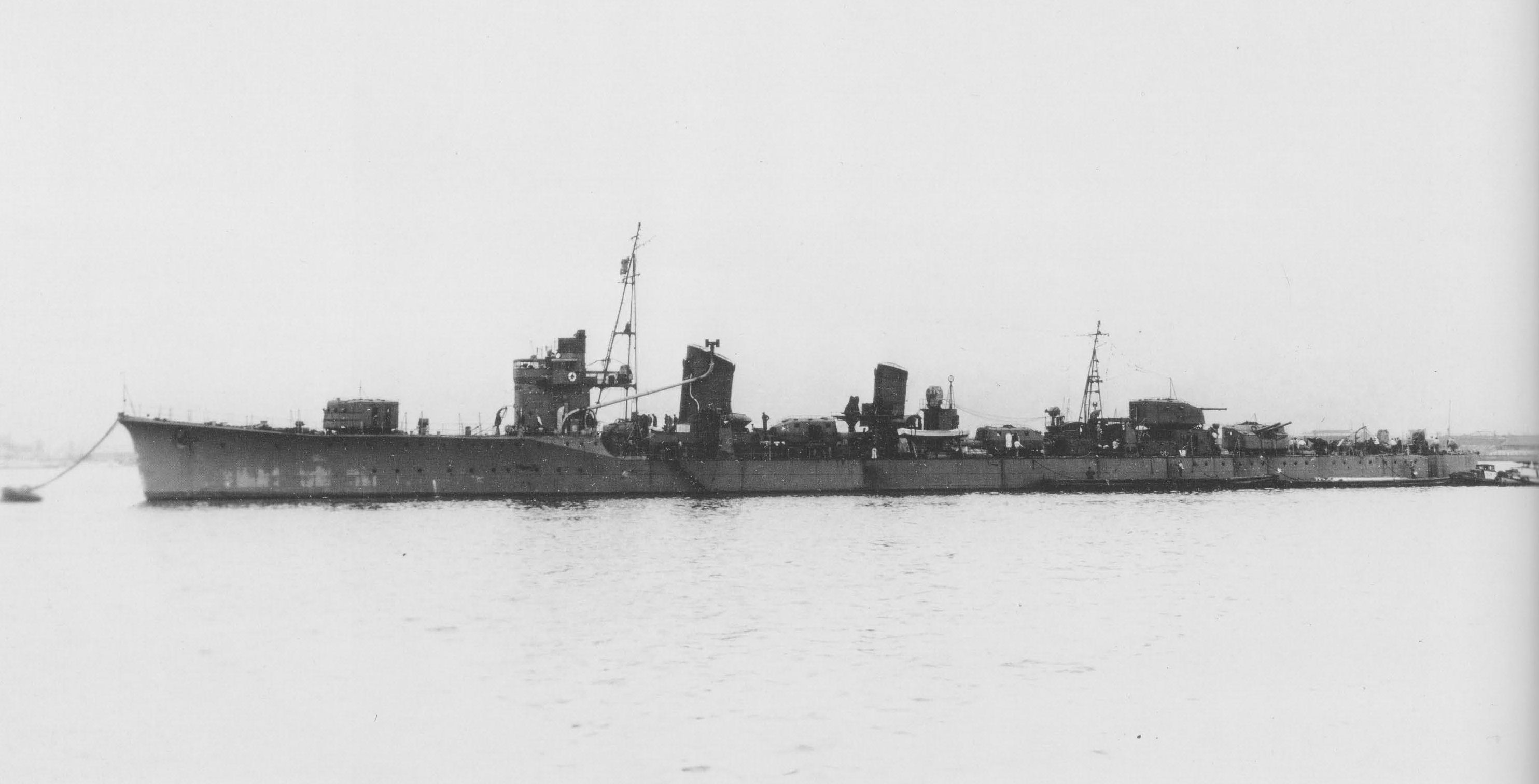
Tanikaze in 1941

On 13 April, an enemy plane sighted Harder north of the western Carolines and reported her position to the patrolling Japanese destroyer Ikazuchi. As the enemy ship closed to within 900 yards (820 m), Harder fired a spread of torpedoes that sank the attacker within five minutes. Dealey's terse report became famous—"Expended four torpedoes and one Jap destroyer." Four days later, Harder spotted a merchant ship escorted by destroyers. Firing four torpedoes, she sank the 7,000-ton Matsue Maru and damaged one of her escorts. Then, adding to the enemy's losses, she returned to Woleai, where she surfaced on the morning of 20 April to deliver a shore bombardment under cover of a rain squall. She ended this highly varied and successful patrol at Fremantle Submarine Base, Western Australia, on 3 May.

=== Fifth war patrol: Philippine mission ===
Even greater successes lay ahead. Having sunk one destroyer, Harder joined the all-out hunt against Japanese destroyers, once considered the most dangerous of foes. Assigned the area around the Japanese fleet anchorage at Tawi-Tawi, Harder departed Fremantle on 26 May 1944 with Redfin and headed for the Celebes Sea.

On 6 June, Harder entered the heavily patrolled Sibutu Passage between Tawi-Tawi and North Borneo and encountered a convoy of three tankers and two destroyers. She gave chase on the surface, but was illuminated by the moon. As one of the destroyers turned to attack, Harder submerged, turned her stern to the charging destroyer, and fired three torpedoes at a range of 1,100 yards (1,000 m). Two struck Minazuki and exploded; the destroyer sank within five minutes. After attacking the second escort without success, Harder was held down by a depth-charge attack, while the convoy escaped.

Early the next morning, an enemy plane spotted Harder. The submarine soon sighted another destroyer searching the area for her. As before, Harder took the initiative as the enemy closed the range. The boat fired three torpedoes at short range, and two of them struck amidships, one detonating the ship's magazine with a tremendous explosion. Hayanami sank a minute later. Following the inevitable depth-charge attack, Harder transited the Sibutu Passage after dark and steamed to the northeast coast of Borneo. There on the night of 8 June, she picked up six Australian coastwatchers, and early the next day, she headed once more for the Sibutu Passage.

That evening, Harder sighted two enemy destroyers patrolling the narrowest part of the passage, just a few miles from Tawi-Tawi. After submerging, she made an undetected approach and at 1,000 yards (900 m) fired four torpedoes at the overlapping targets. The second and third torpedoes blasted Tanikaze; she sank almost immediately, her boilers erupting with a terrific explosion. The fourth shot hit the second ship, which exploded with a blinding flash. Within minutes, Harder surfaced to survey the results, but both ships had disappeared. Soon afterward, she underwent the inevitable depth-charge attack by enemy planes, then she set course for a point south of Tawi-Tawi to reconnoiter.

On the afternoon of 10 June, Harder sighted a large Japanese task force, including three battleships and four cruisers with screening destroyers. An overhead plane spotted the submarine at periscope depth, and a screening escort promptly steamed at 35 knots (65 km/h) toward her position. Once again, Harder became the aggressive adversary. As the range closed to 1,500 yards (1,400 m), she fired three torpedoes on a "down the throat" shot, then went deep to escape the onrushing destroyer and certain depth-charge attack. Within a minute, two torpedoes blasted the ship with violent force just as Harder passed her some 80 feet (24 m) below. The deafening explosions shook the submarine far worse than the depth charges and aerial bombs that the infuriated enemy dropped during the next two hours. When she surfaced, Harder saw only a lighted buoy marking the spot where the unidentified destroyer either sank or was heavily damaged.

Harder reconnoitered Tawi-Tawi anchorage on 11 June and sighted additional enemy cruisers and destroyers. At 16:00, she headed for the open sea and that night transmitted her observations, which were of vital importance to Admiral Raymond A. Spruance's fleet before the decisive Battle of the Philippine Sea. Harder sailed to Darwin on 21 June for additional torpedoes, and after patrolling the Flores Sea south of the Celebes Islands (with Admiral Ralph Christie aboard), she ended the patrol at Darwin on 3 July.

The important results of Harder's fifth war patrol have caused some to call it the most brilliant of the war. Not only did Harder further deplete the critical supply of destroyers by sinking four of them and heavily damaging or destroying another one in four days, but also her frequent attacks and a rash of enemy contact reports on this fleeting marauder so frightened Admiral Soemu Toyoda that he believed Tawi-Tawi to be surrounded by submarines. As a result, Admiral Jisaburo Ozawa's Mobile Fleet departed Tawi-Tawi a day ahead of schedule. The premature departure upset the Japanese battle plans and forced Ozawa to delay his carrier force in the Philippine Sea, thus contributing to the stunning defeat suffered by the Japanese in the ensuing battle.

Harder's radioman, Calvin Bull, was awarded a Bronze Star medal for his role in sinking the five destroyers.

=== Sixth war patrol ===
Harder, accompanied by Hake and Haddo, departed Fremantle on 5 August 1944 for her sixth and final war patrol. Assigned to the South China Sea off Luzon, the wolfpack headed northward. On 21 August, Harder and Haddo joined Ray, Guitarro, and Raton in a coordinated attack against a convoy off Palawan Bay, Mindoro. The Japanese lost four passenger-cargo ships, possibly one by Harder.

==== Battle of Dasol Bay ====
Early the next day, Harder and Haddo attacked and destroyed three coastal-defense vessels off Bataan, Harder sinking frigates Matsuwa and Hiburi; then, joined by Hake that night, they headed for Caiman Point, Luzon. At dawn on 23 August, Haddo attacked and fatally damaged Asakaze off Cape Bolinao. Enemy trawlers towed the stricken destroyer to Dasol Bay, and Haddo, her torpedoes expended, informed Harder and Hake the following night of the attack and left the wolfpack for replenishment at Biak.

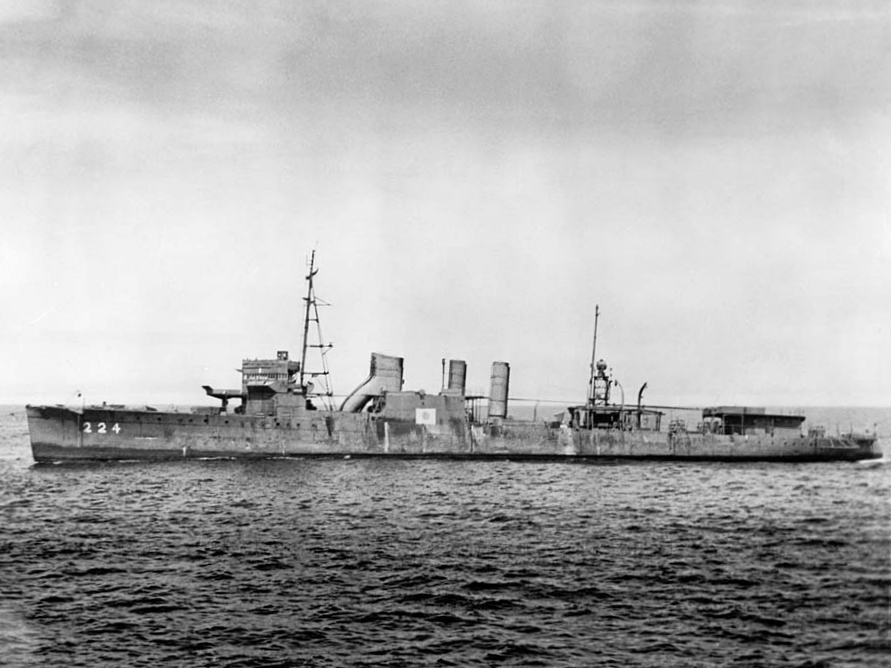
PB-102 after recapture from Japanese Imperial Navy and recommissioning in the USN as DD-224 USS Stewart

Harder and Hake remained off Dasol Bay, searching for new targets. Before dawn on 24 August, two ships were spotted, which they initially identified as a Japanese minesweeper and the three-stack Siamese destroyer Phra Ruang. The two ships were later discovered to be the Japanese Type D escort ship CD-22, and the very unusual destroyer PB-102, flying the Japanese flag. PB-102 was built in the United States and commissioned as USS Stewart, a Clemson-class destroyer, but she was damaged by Japanese fire during the Battle of Badung Strait. While under repair in drydock at Surabaya in February 1942, the Japanese captured the airfield at Bali, thus threatening the naval base, so the ship was scuttled at the docks early in World War II. The Japanese Navy discovered the wreck and raised, repaired, and recommissioned the vessel into Japanese service in 1943 as Patrol Boat No. 102.

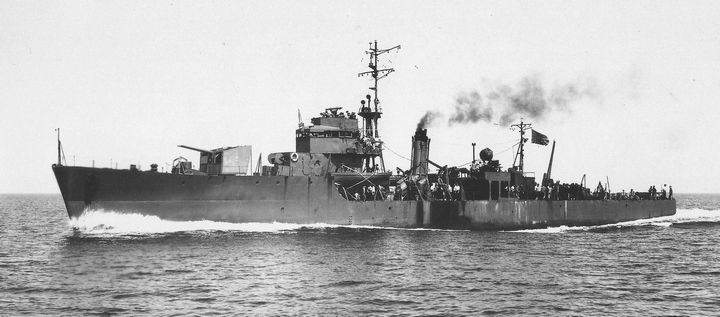
CD-22 underway in March of 1944

As Hake closed to attack, the destroyer turned away toward Dasol Bay. Hake broke off her approach, turned northward, and then sighted Harder's periscope about 600–700 yards (550–640 m) dead ahead. Swinging southward to avoid a collision, Hake then sighted CD-22 about 2,000 yards (1,800 m) off her port quarter swinging toward them. To escape the charging escort, Hake started deep and rigged for silent running. At 07:28, she heard 15 rapid depth charges explode in the distance astern, after which, communication with Harder was lost. She continued evasive action that morning, then returned to the general area of the attack shortly after noon. She swept the area at periscope depth, but found only a ring of marker buoys covering a radius of one-half mile.

The vigorous depth-charge attack had sunk Harder with all hands. The Japanese report of the attack concluded that "much oil, wood chips, and cork floated in the vicinity." The United States Navy declared her loss on 2 January 1945.

Dubbed "Hit 'Em Harder", she had wreaked havoc among Japanese shipping. Her record of aggressive, daring exploits became almost legendary. All six of her patrols were designated successful. Harder received six battle stars and the Presidential Unit Citation for World War II service. Following Navy custom, the citation was presented to the second Harder upon commissioning.

Despite the loss of nine more submarines in late 1944, towards the end of the war, U.S. fleet boats were actively penetrating through the Inland Sea, and the Japanese shipping losses continued, albeit at a slower rate.

== Discovery of wreck ==
On 22 May 2024, Tiburon Subsea CEO Tim Taylor and the Lost 52 Project announced that they had discovered the wreck of Harder in the South China Sea near the Philippines' northern island of Luzon. Taylor's discovery was confirmed by the U.S. Navy based on video footage taken of the wreckage. Harder sits mostly intact and upright at a depth of 3,750 feet (1,140 m). A large hole on the port side just aft of the conning tower indicates Harder likely received a direct hit by a depth charge, similar to the fate suffered by Lagarto.

== Awards ==
- Presidential Unit Citation
- Asiatic-Pacific Campaign Medal with six battle stars
- World War II Victory Medal
