= Veterans' Memorial Hall (Duluth, Minnesota) =

Coordinates: 46°46′52.7″N 92°6′15.3″W

Veterans Memorial Hall, or VMH, located in Duluth, Minnesota, is a program of the Saint Louis County, Minnesota, Historical Society. It is located at the Saint Louis County Heritage and Arts Center (the Depot). Its mission is to collect veterans' stories and artifacts, to maintain a permanent exhibit recognizing the military service of local veterans and units, and to educate the public about local veteran history.

== Saint Louis County Expansion ==
At the turn of the 20th century, Saint Louis County's population was booming. Duluth, the county seat, was incorporated in 1857. Owing to westward migration, vast regional resources, and local opportunity, its population grew exponentially. Many American Civil War veterans recognized the economic opportunities of the area and relocated to the area. By the early 1900s, Duluth had approximately 100,000 residents and was positioned to rival Chicago as a Great Lakes port. Duluth had more millionaires per capita than another other American city, and its future looked bright.

County leaders, reflecting this optimism, determined to build a courthouse that would be unparalleled in Minnesota. To this end, they sought out the services of one of the prominent architects of the time, Daniel Hudson Burnham. He had achieved fame for his design of the Chicago World's Fair in 1893 and the Flatiron Building in New York City, among others.

Burnham agreed to design the new courthouse and the layout for the Duluth Civic Center of which it was a part. The Saint Louis County Courthouse, which was completed in 1909, would cost $1 million.

== The role of Civil War veterans ==
The courthouse design and implementation were influenced by two national trends. First, as the nation expanded westward, the young states, counties, and municipalities undertook massive public construction projects to support governmental services—executive, legislative, and judicial—in the newly expanded areas. Second, in the post-war period, Civil War veterans who had fought for the Union had formed local units of the Grand Army of the Republic, or GAR. The GAR was primarily a social organization, with local posts throughout the country; and politically speaking, the GAR, as a bloc, wielded significant influence.

These two trends converged, with the result that political leaders found it politically expedient to secure the support of local GAR chapters for the construction of proposed public construction projects.

In Minnesota, state leaders appealed to the GAR for support when architectural plans were being drafted for the capitol building in St. Paul. The GAR supported the project, with the agreement that a room in the capitol would be dedicated to veterans. Their request was honored; visitors to the capitol today can still see veteran-related artifacts on display in the rotunda. Although conclusive documentation cannot be found, it appears that a similar arrangement was made at the time that plans were being made for the Saint Louis County Courthouse: it would include a Soldiers Memorial Room. This is supported by the fact that Duluth was so large that it boasted three different GAR posts: Joshua B. Culver Post #128, Willis A. Gorman Post #13, and the Rutherford B. Hayes Post (which did not last long). ,

In his design, Burnham devoted a significant portion of the main floor of the new courthouse to the Soldiers Memorial Room. It comprised a library, stage, auditorium, dining room, and kitchen, and was furnished in a style consistent with the courthouse as a whole. The blueprints for the structure, drafted on oversized sheets of linen, are displayed at the Saint Louis County Courthouse.

== An elegant monument ==
In the 1920s, the Soldiers Memorial Room started to be known as "Memorial Hall." Veteran activity at Memorial Hall was still significant, and the Joshua Culvar GAR Post decided to install a new flagpole outside the courthouse. Cass Gilbert—who had designed the U.S. Supreme Court building in Washington, D.C.—was hired to create it. The flagpole features a memorial at its base dedicated to the members of the post, the "Sailors and Soldiers Monument." Paul Wayland Bartlett, who is perhaps best known for sculpting the pediment for the House of Representatives at the U.S. Capitol building, also sculpted the image of a knight that sits at the front of the monument.

== Veteran interest declines ==
With the passage of time came a reduction in the membership of the GAR posts. In 1926, the two remaining GAR posts merged to become the Gorman-Culver Post #13. The Hall also began to be used by United Spanish War veterans: in 1954, the John McEwen Camp No. 6 made use of the hall to celebrate their 56th anniversary. The veterans who returned from World War II did not embrace the hall as had previous veterans. Perhaps because of the existence of veteran organizations such as Veterans of Foreign Wars and American Legions, veteran use of the hall gradually dropped off. Simultaneously, local governmental pressure to redesignate that portion of the courthouse for other uses may have been on the rise.

Memorial Hall was officially closed on October 19, 1965. Many of its contents were distributed to various veteran organizations.

== A new beginning ==
Shortly after the hall left the premises of the courthouse, it was renamed Veterans Memorial Hall and was given a small room at the Saint Louis County Heritage and Arts Center (the Depot).

In the 1990s, a movement to combine Veterans' Memorial Hall with the Saint Louis County Historical Society began, and VMH took on the identity that it has today. It officially opened to the public as Veterans' Memorial Hall on Veteran's Day 1999.

Sustained by the Saint Louis County Historical Society and military service veterans from the "Arrowhead" region of northeastern Minnesota, VMH has, since that time, enhanced its role. It records and transcribes veterans' oral histories. Its veterans' files (providing information about veterans who are connected to the region) total more than 7,500, available in both paper and electronic form. The VMH website serves as a repository for veterans' stories and is also a research tool for those seeking information on individual veterans. In addition, the site features articles about the history of military units based in northeastern Minnesota. Finally, VMH has established a permanent exhibit that recognizes the service of local veterans and units and, with the assistance of interns, develops new temporary exhibits that focus on individual veterans and selected items from the collection.

== Notable veterans of northeastern Minnesota ==
- Mike Colalillo – Medal of Honor recipient
- Henry Courtney – Medal of Honor recipient
- Oscar Frederick Nelson – Medal of Honor recipient
- Joseph Gomer – Tuskegee Airman
- Donald E. Rudolph – Medal of Honor recipient
- Dale Eugene Wayrynen – Medal of Honor recipient
- Albert Woolson – Last surviving veteran of the American Civil War
