= USS Bridget =

Dealey-class destroyer escort

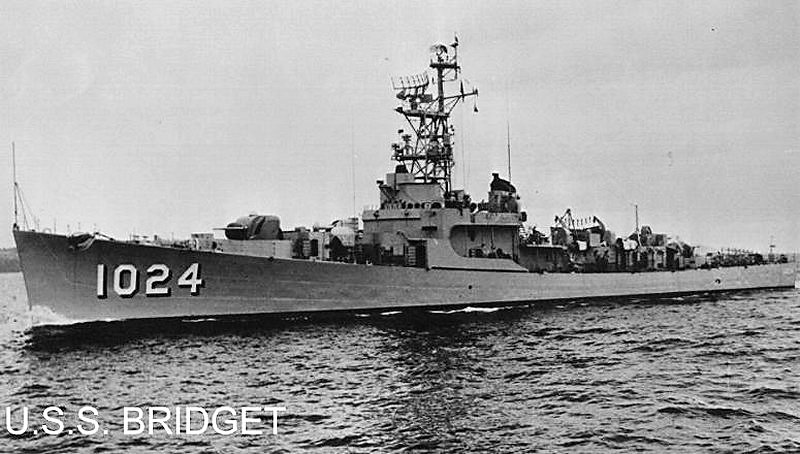
- USS Bridget (DE-1024)

History

United States
- Name: USS Bridget
- Namesake: Francis Joseph Bridget
- Builder: Puget Sound Bridge and Dredging Company, Seattle
- Cost: $6.000.000
- Yard number: DE-1024
- Laid down: 19 September 1955
- Launched: 25 April 1956
- Sponsored by: Mrs. Francis J Bridget
- Christened: Apr 25 1956
- Completed: 1957
- Commissioned: 24 October 1957
- Decommissioned: September 1973
- In service: 1957-1973
- Out of service: Nov 1973
- Renamed: 1975
- Stricken: 12 November 1973
- Fate: Sold for scrap

General characteristics
- Class & type: Dealey-class destroyer escort
- Displacement: 1,877 long tons (1,907 t) full load
- Length: 314 ft 6 in (95.86 m)
- Beam: 36 ft 9 in (11.20 m)
- Draft: 18 ft (5.5 m)
- Propulsion: 2 × Foster-Wheeler boilers; 1 × De Laval geared turbine; 20,000 shp (15 MW); 1 shaft
- Speed: 21 knots (24 mph; 39 km/h)
- Range: 6,000 nmi (11,000 km) at 12 kn (14 mph; 22 km/h)
- Complement: 170
- Armament: 4 × 3 inch/50 caliber guns; 1 × Squid ASW mortar; 6 × 324 mm (12.8 in) Mark 32 torpedo tubes; Mark 46 torpedoes

Service record

USS Bridget (DE-1024) was a Dealey-class destroyer escort in the United States Navy. She was named for Francis Joseph Bridget, a naval aviator who served on the Commander's Staff of Patrol Wing 10 during the Japanese attack on the Philippines on 8 December 1941. Bridget commanded a Naval Battalion during the Battle of the Points. He was taken prisoner with the American forces on Bataan and was killed 15 December 1944 when a Japanese prison ship in which he was embarked was sunk off Olongapo, Luzon, Philippine Islands.
