= End Around (submarine tactic) =

The end around was a submarine tactic used when the position of a submarine (relative to a potential target) did not allow the submarine to mount an immediate attack. The submarine's crew estimated the enemy's bearing, heading, and speed, remaining submerged until out of the enemy's visual range. The submarine then surfaced and proceeded at maximum speed to a position in front of the target, near the target's predicted course but remaining out of view. The submarine would then submerge, approach, and attack.

== Attack factors ==
The location from which a submarine could attack varied mostly according to the relative top speeds of the attacker and its target. Diesel-electric-powered submarines in the Second World War were typically capable of 18-23 knots on the surface under diesel power and up to 9 knots underwater, where they were restricted (if lacking a snorkel) to battery power. Battle fleets in World War II might have a top speed of up to 30 knots, making it difficult for submarines to achieve attack position. A convoy of freighters or tankers typically proceeded at up to 10 knots. Submarines, especially when submerged, were consequently sometimes slower than their prey. Attack opportunities would also be lost if the target detected the submarine and altered course to avoid attack.

=== Execution ===
To attack, a sub usually had to get ahead of its target: the end around was one solution to this problem. If a submarine couldn't attack due to unfavorable positioning, its crew would determine the target's course and speed, then calculate a potential torpedo firing point. The end around might then proceed as follows.

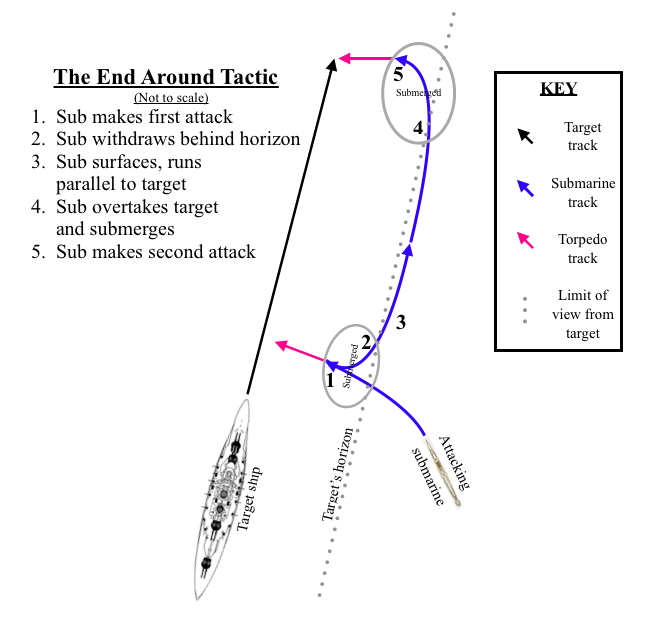
A two-attack end around maneuver

1. The submarine attempts an initial attack. If spotted by a target or escorts, the sub usually submerges.
2. The submarine moves away from the target (out of visual range) and surfaces.
3. The submarine proceeds at best speed to overtake and pass the target on a parallel course, using the curvature of the Earth, darkness, and weather events (such as rain, snow, and fog) to stay out of the target's view.
4. After gaining position ahead of the target, the submarine approaches, readies torpedoes and calculates an optimal attack.
5. The submarine executes the next attack, either while surfaced or submerged.

The process can be repeated as long as the sub is able to do so.

The end around tactic was useful largely because of submarines' low freeboard, which made them less visible than much-taller merchantmen and warships. Using the targets' superstructure and exhaust smoke to estimate and maintain proper distance, a skilled sub commander could maintain a close watch on enemy ships while keeping his own vessel unseen. While not called "end around," this tactic was used by U-boats during World War I.

=== Other considerations ===
A modification to this tactic incorporated the night surface attack, where the submarine remained surfaced during the actual attack, rather than submerging first. This variation allowed the submarine to take advantage of its higher surface speed, but made pre-attack detection more likely. This could result in a counterattack by escorts, or the targets could turn to spoil the attack. Surface attacks could be executed in daylight―or to facilitate an attack using the sub's deck gun―again with added risk.

As a defense, ships can adopt zig-zag sailing patterns rather than more-efficient great-circle navigation. Sailing in zig-zags made computing a target angle more difficult for the submarine crew, especially if the pattern was irregular. Repetitively varying a 90° base course ten degrees either way (80°, 100°, 80°, 100°) makes it easy to determine the ship's intended direction. Irregular course changes (first 80°, then 110°, 95°, 75°, etc.) are best, as irregular zig-zagging obscures the target's base course, making interception harder to calculate and complicating the target solution. On the negative side, zig-zags slow a ship's progress, allowing attackers to overtake more quickly.
