= Japanese destroyer Yukikaze =

Two Japanese destroyers have been named Yukikaze :

- Japanese destroyer Yukikaze (1939), a Kagerō-class destroyer launched in 1939 and ceded to the Republic of China in 1947 who renamed her ROCS Tan Yang. She was scrapped in 1970.
- JDS Yukikaze (DD-102), a Harukaze-class destroyer launched in 1955 and stricken in 1985
