= USS Roanoke (CL-145) =

Worcester-class cruiser of the US Navy

Coordinates: 37.2682992°N 79.9404797°W

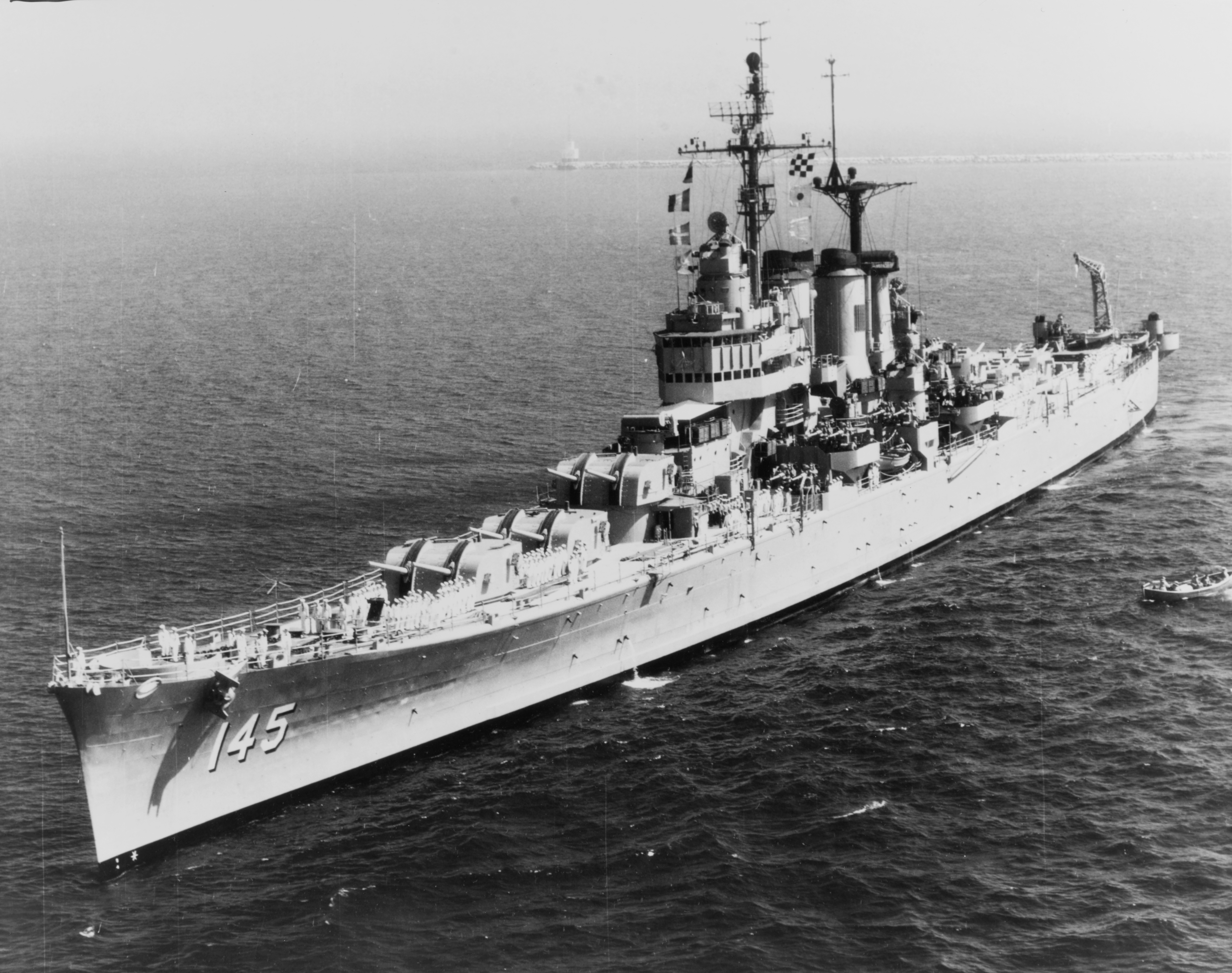
- USS Roanoke underway, circa the early 1950s

History

United States
- Name: Roanoke
- Namesake: Roanoke, Virginia
- Builder: New York Shipbuilding Corporation
- Laid down: 15 May 1945
- Launched: 16 June 1947
- Commissioned: 4 April 1949
- Decommissioned: 31 October 1958
- Stricken: 1 December 1970
- Identification: Callsign: NIQE; Hull number: CL-145
- Motto: Nunc Parati Sumus; (Now we are prepared)
- Honors and awards: See Awards
- Fate: Scrapped, 22 February 1972
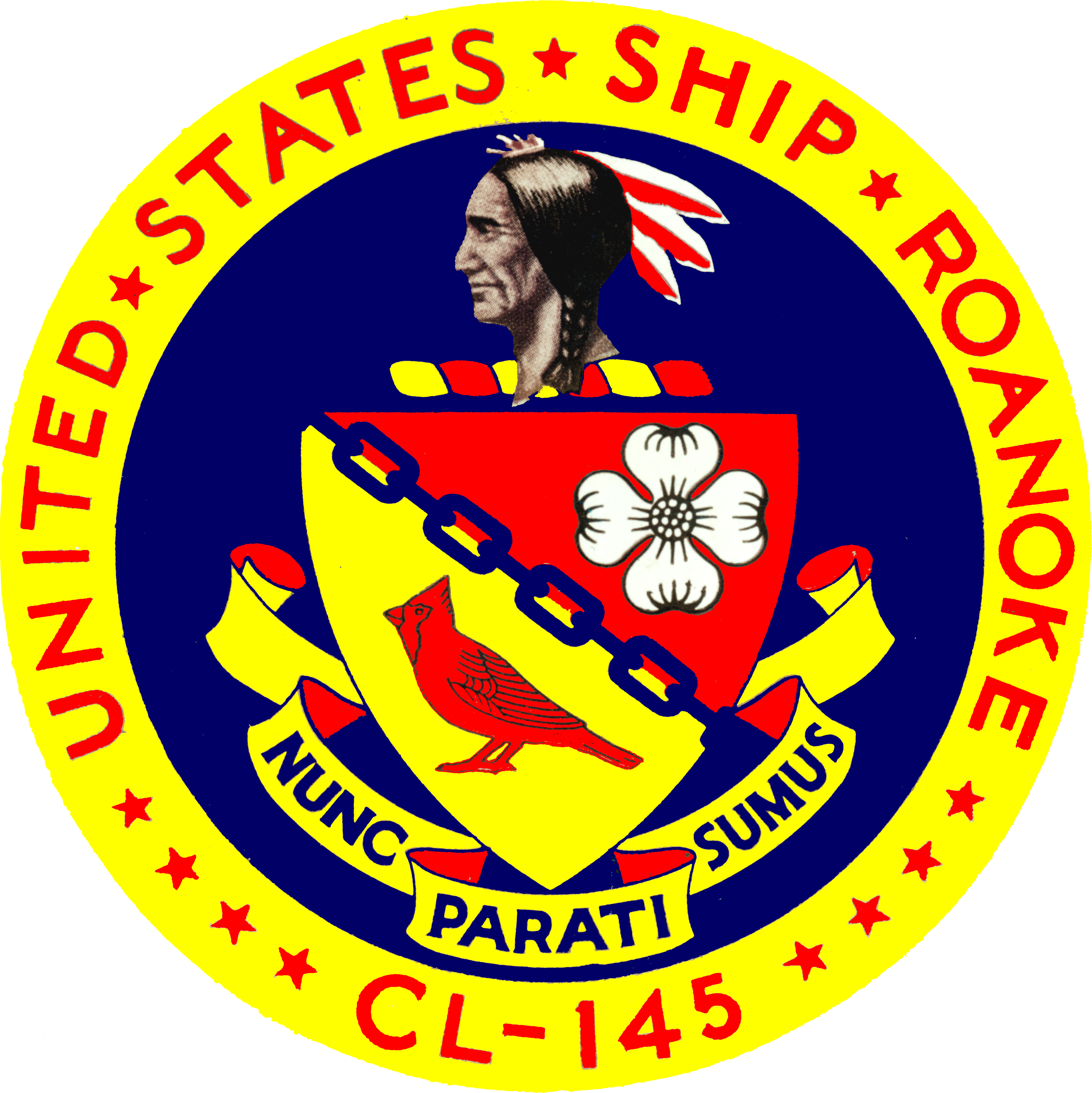
- Badge

General characteristics
- Class & type: Worcester-class light cruiser
- Displacement: 14,700 long tons (14,936 t) (standard); 17,997 long tons (18,286 t) (full)
- Length: 664 ft (202 m) wl; 679 ft 6 in (207.11 m) oa
- Beam: 70 ft 6 in (21.5 m)
- Draft: 25 ft (7.6 m)
- Propulsion: 4 × Westinghouse 620 psi boilers; 4 × geared steam turbines; 4 × screws; 125,000 Horsepower
- Speed: 33 knots
- Boats & landing craft carried: 2-4 × lifeboats
- Complement: 1,560 officers and enlisted
- Sensors & processing systems: AN/SPS-10 surface-search radar; AN/SPS-6 air-search radar; AN/SPS-8A height-finding radar; AN/URD-4 radio direction finder; AN/URN-3 TACAN; AN/SLR-2 ECM Receiver
- Armament: Early: 12 × dual 6"/47cal guns; 11 × dual 3"/50 caliber Mark 33 guns; 2 × single 3"/50 caliber Mark 34 guns; Later: 12 × dual 6"/47cal guns; 10 × dual 3"/50 caliber Mark 33 guns; 2 × single 3"/50 caliber Mark 34 guns
- Armor: belt: 3–5 in (76–127 mm); deck: 3.5 in (89 mm) (max); turrets: 2–6.5 in (51–165 mm); barbettes: 5 in (127 mm); conning tower: 4.5 in (114 mm)
- Aviation facilities: 2 × aircraft catapults

USS Roanoke (CL-145) was the second ship of the Worcester-class light cruisers completed for the U.S. Navy shortly after the end of World War II. Commissioned in 1949, she served in the Atlantic, Mediterranean and Pacific before being decommissioned in 1958. She was sold for scrap in 1972.

== Construction and Commissioning ==
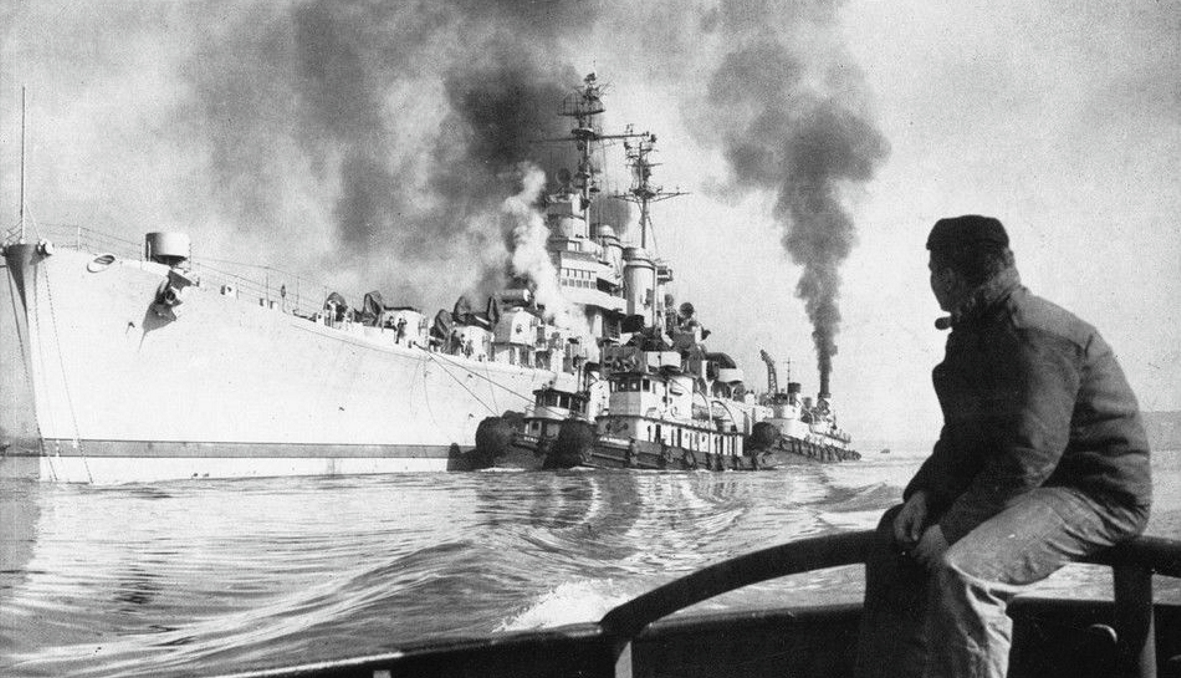
Roanoke in early 1949

Roanoke was laid down on 15 May 1945 by the New York Shipbuilding Corp., Camden, New Jersey; launched on 16 June 1947; sponsored by Miss Julia Ann Henebry; and commissioned at Philadelphia on 4 April 1949.

Following a shakedown cruise in the Caribbean, Roanoke undertook maneuvers in the Atlantic as a unit of the Battleship-Cruiser Force and on 6 January 1950 got underway to join the 6th Fleet in the Mediterranean for her first extended deployment. Returning to the United States in May, she alternated 6th Fleet deployments with operations in the western Atlantic until the summer of 1952 when she added a midshipman's cruise to Europe and the Caribbean to her schedule. Continuing to operate in the Battleship-Cruiser Force, U.S. Atlantic Fleet until the fall of 1955, Roanoke completed her sixth Mediterranean deployment in May, then prepared for transfer to the Pacific Fleet.

On 22 September 1955, Roanoke departed Norfolk, Va., for the Panama Canal. Homeported at Long Beach, she conducted nine Naval Reserve cruises and completed three WestPac cruises, May to December 1956, September 1957 to March 1958, and September to October 1958, before decommissioning on 31 October 1958.

=== Decommissioning ===
She was berthed at Mare Island in 1963 until sold to the Levin Metals Corporation of San Jose, California on 22 February 1972.

Her bell can be seen on display outside of Elmwood Park which is inside Roanoke Public Library. Roanoke’s model is on display in the Virginia Museum of Transportation, Roanoke, Virginia.

== Awards ==
- Navy Occupation Medal with (Europe clasp)
- National Defense Service Medal

== Gallery ==
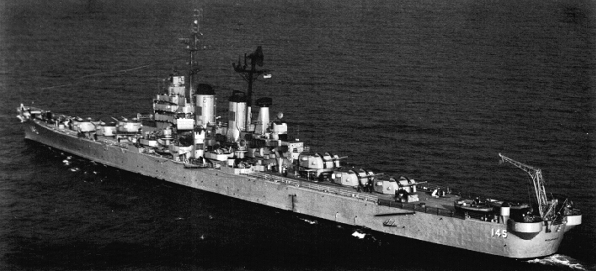
Aft view of Roanoke underway, circa in 1949

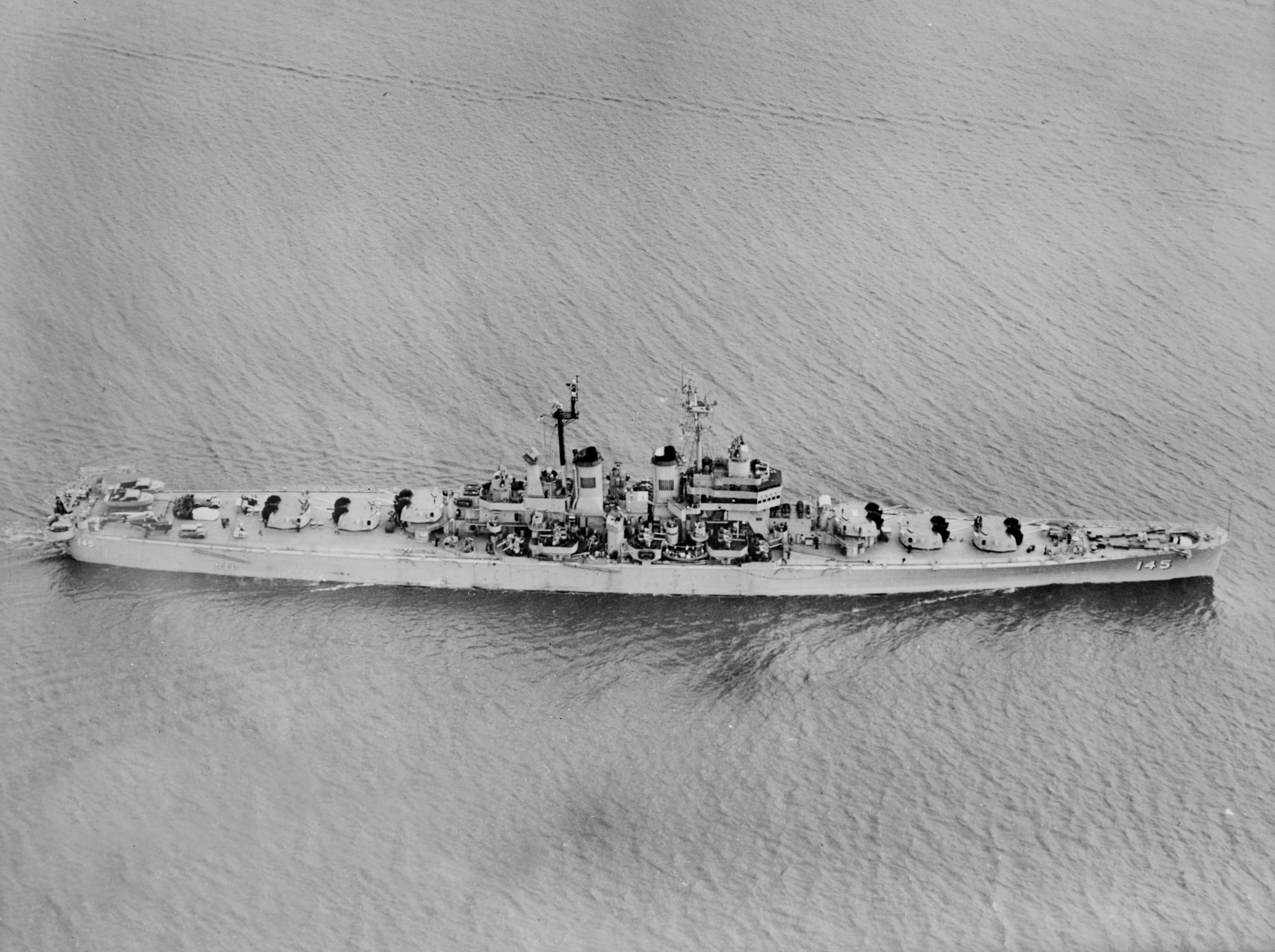
Roanoke underway in January 1950

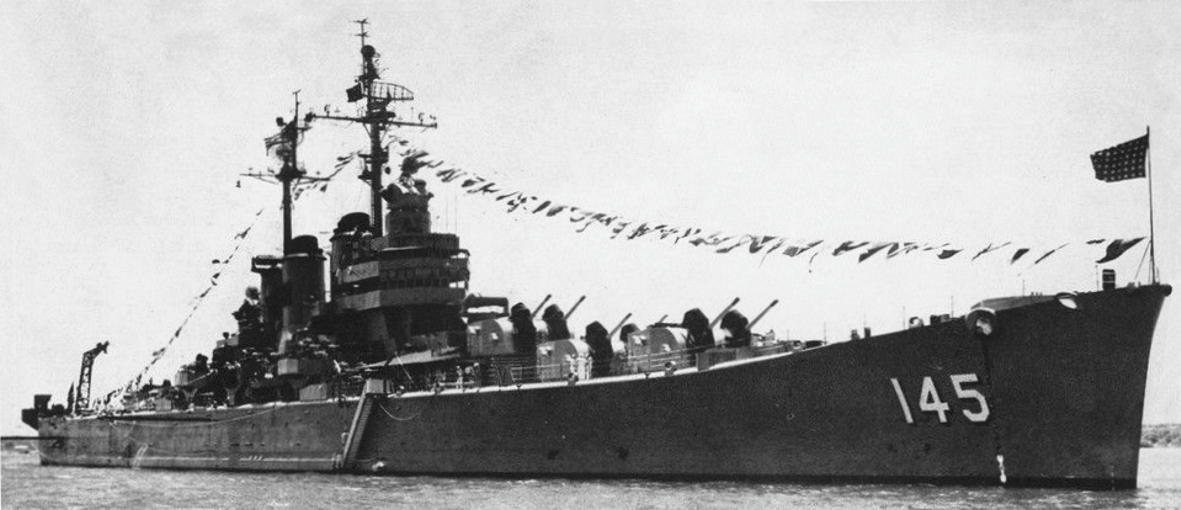
Roanoke at anchor off Famagusta on 22 February 1950

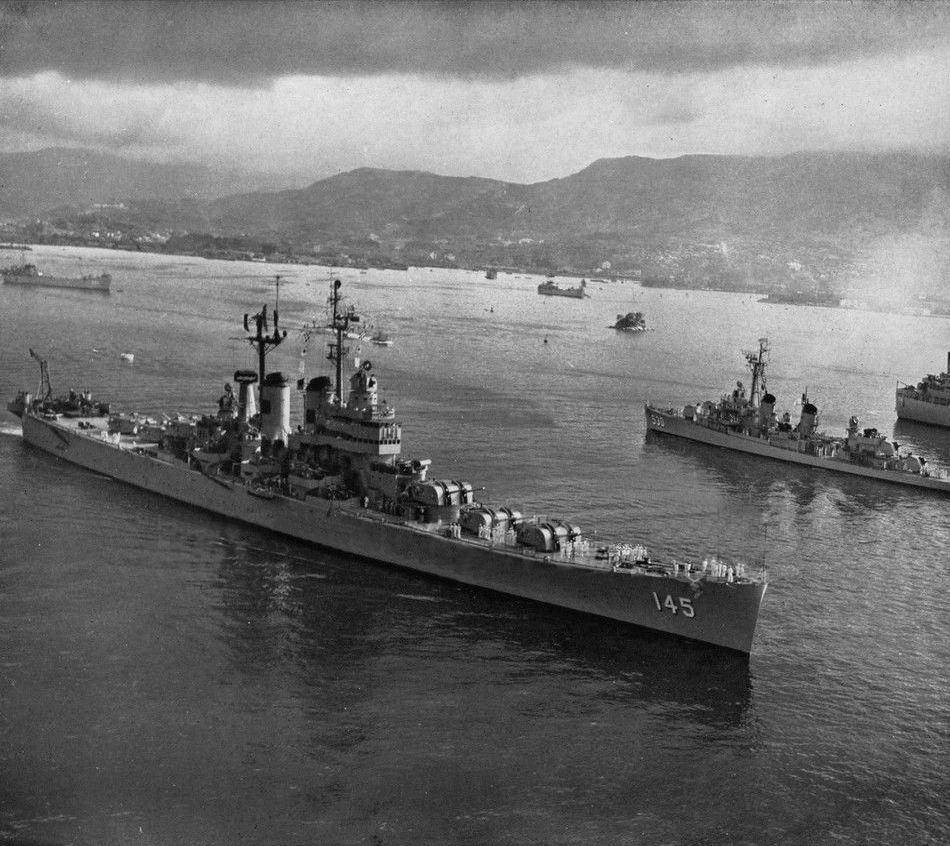
Roanoke off Sasebo, in 1956

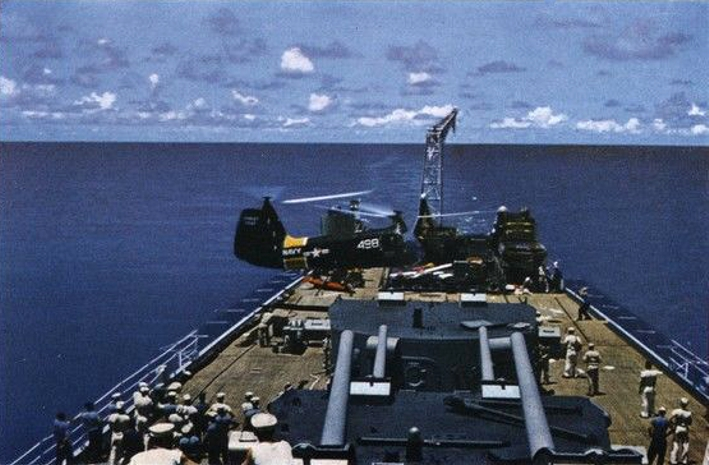
HUP Retriever landing aboard Roanoke in 1956
