= Japanese ship Harukaze =

Three Japanese navy ships have been named Harukaze :

- Japanese destroyer Harukaze (1905), a Kamikaze-class destroyer launched in 1905 and scrapped in 1928
- Japanese destroyer Harukaze (1922), a Kamikaze-class destroyer launched in 1922 and scrapped in 1947
- JDS Harukaze, a Harukaze-class destroyer launched in 1955 and stricken in 1985
