= Harukaze =

Harukaze (Japanese "spring breeze") may refer to:

== Songs ==
- "Harukaze" (song), a 2012 song by Scandal
- "Harukaze" (Doa song), a 2007 song by Doa
- "Harukaze" (Quruli song), a 2000 song by Quruli
- "Harukaze" (Yuzu song), a 2007 song by Yuzu
- "Harukaze" (Rihwa song), a 2014 song by Rihwa

== Other ==
- Doremi Harukaze, a.k.a. Dorie Goodwyn, the title character of the anime series Ojamajo Doremi
- Pop Harukaze, a.k.a. Caitlyn Goodwyn, a supporting character in Ojamajo Doremi
- Japanese destroyer Harukaze, a list of ships
