= USS Worcester (CL-144) =

Lead ship of Worcester-class cruisers

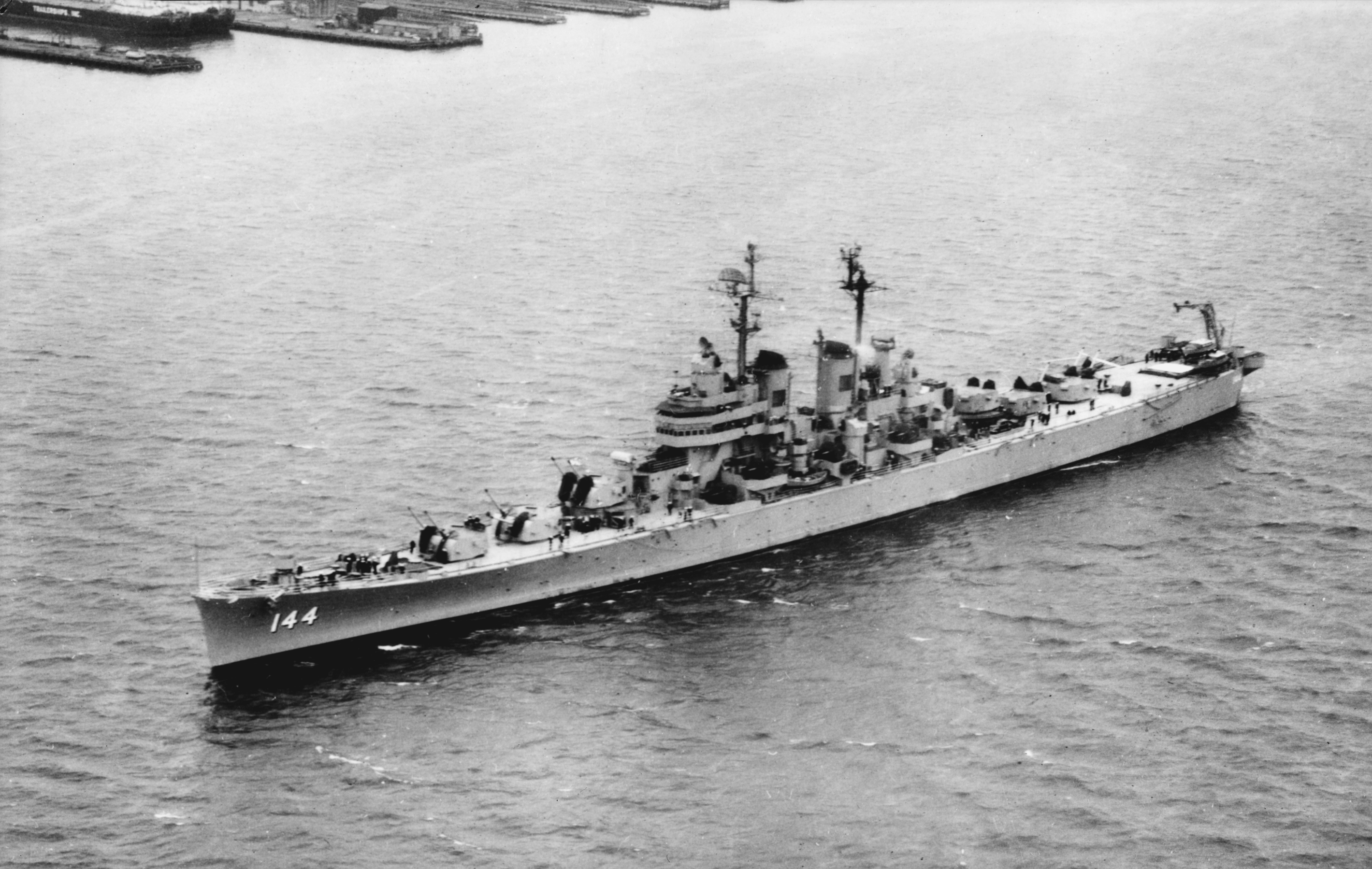
- USS Worcester in November 1949

History

United States
- Name: Worcester
- Namesake: Worcester, Massachusetts
- Builder: New York Shipbuilding Corporation
- Laid down: 29 January 1945
- Launched: 4 February 1947
- Commissioned: 26 June 1948
- Decommissioned: 19 December 1958
- Stricken: 1 December 1970
- Identification: Callsign: NIPI; Hull number: CL-144
- Honors and awards: See Awards
- Fate: Scrapped, 5 July 1972

General characteristics
- Class & type: Worcester-class light cruiser
- Displacement: 14,700 long tons (14,936 t) (standard); 17,997 long tons (18,286 t) (full)
- Length: 664 ft (202 m) wl; 679 ft 6 in (207.11 m) oa
- Beam: 70 ft 8 in (21.5 m)
- Draft: 26 ft (7.9 m)
- Propulsion: 4 × Westinghouse 620 psi boilers; 4 × geared steam turbines; 4 × screws; 120,000 Horsepower
- Speed: 33 knots
- Boats & landing craft carried: 2-4 × lifeboats
- Complement: 1,560 officers and enlisted
- Sensors & processing systems: AN/SPS-10 surface-search radar; AN/SPS-6 air-search radar; AN/SPS-8A height-finding radar; AN/URD-4 radio direction finder; AN/URN-3 TACAN; AN/SLR-2 ECM Receiver
- Armament: 6 × dual 6"/47 caliber guns; 11 × dual 3"/50 caliber Mark 33 guns; 2 × single 3"/50 caliber Mark 34 guns; 12 x dual 20mm guns
- Armor: belt: 3–5 in (76–127 mm); deck: 3.5 in (89 mm) (max); turrets: 2–6.5 in (51–165 mm); barbettes: 5 in (127 mm); conning tower: 5 in (127 mm)
- Aviation facilities: 2 × aircraft catapults

USS Worcester (CL-144) was a light cruiser in the United States Navy. Worcester was the lead ship of the Worcester-class of light cruisers. She was launched just after World War II had ended and commissioned in 1948, before being decommissioned in 1958.

== Description and design ==
The Worcester combined the maneuverability of a destroyer with the size of a cruiser, using a main battery that could engage both surface targets and aircraft. The design was largely considered a failure due to the main armament of twin automatic 6-inch (152 mm) guns. The guns achieved fire rates of 9-10 rpm, which was lower than the similar design of the automatic 8-inch (203 mm) guns on the Des Moines-class heavy cruisers. In addition, the fire control fitted to Worcester was optimized for anti-aircraft fire rather than surface action or naval gunfire support.

== Construction and career ==
Worcester was laid down on 29 January 1945 at Camden, New Jersey, by the New York Shipbuilding and Dry Dock Corp, and launched on 4 February 1947. Sponsored by Gloria Ann Sullivan, the daughter of Mayor Charles F. Sullivan of Worcester, Massachusetts. She was commissioned at the Philadelphia Naval Shipyard on 26 June 1948.

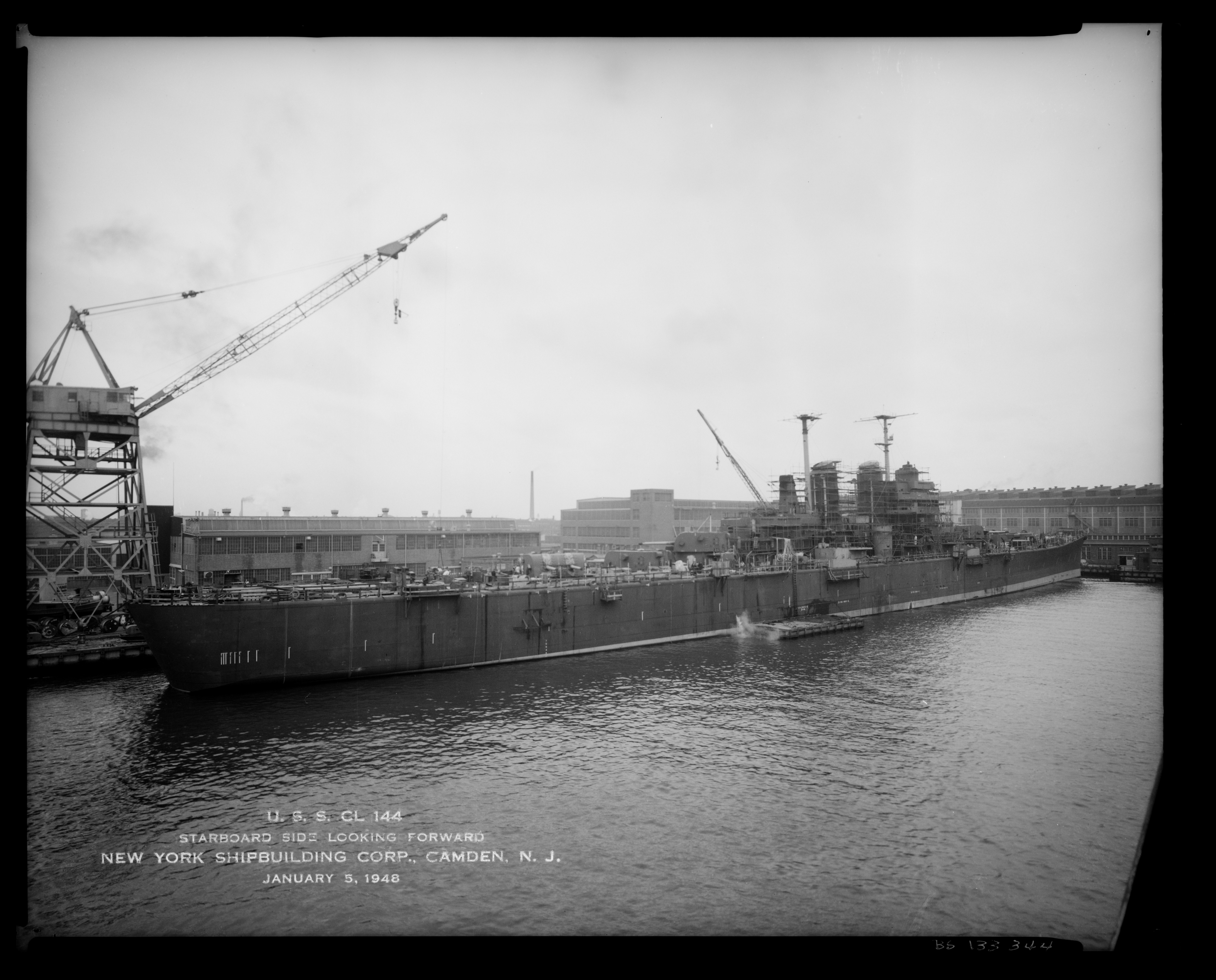
Worcester under construction on 5 January 1946

Worcester was assigned to Cruiser Division 10; she spent the first year of her commissioned service completing her fitting out, conducting shakedown testing, and undergoing availability and type training off the eastern seaboard of the United States. In the summer of 1949, she participated in her first large-scale training exercises in Guantanamo Bay and visited Kingston, Jamaica. Later that summer, she sailed for the Mediterranean, departing Newport, Rhode Island on 6 September and reaching Gibraltar 10 days later. She made her first deployment with the 6th Fleet in the ensuing months, visiting Malta; Bizerte, Tunisia; Golfe-Juan, France; Argostoli and Phaleron Bay, Greece; İskenderun, Turkey; Trieste and Venice, Italy; and Gibraltar. During her 6th Fleet deployment, she engaged in exercises and maneuvers with fast carrier task forces, including the carrier Leyte and the heavy cruiser Des Moines. She returned to Norfolk, Virginia on 10 December.

Worcester operated off the eastern seaboard, ranging from Newport to Norfolk and south to Puerto Rico, with visits in between to Philadelphia, before she began her second 6th Fleet deployment in the spring of 1950. She departed Norfolk on 3 May, arrived at Lisbon on 13 May, and entered the Mediterranean soon thereafter.

In between her cycles of drills and exercises in the Mediterranean, Worcester visited Augusta, Sicily; Bizerte; Genoa and La Spezia, Italy; and Golfe Juan, on the southern coast of France, before she was put into Phaleron Bay on 20 July. She was there only for a week before she received orders to sail for the Far East. While the light cruiser and her consorts had been operating in the Mediterranean, war had broken out in Korea on 25 June. Accordingly, Worcester departed Phaleron Bay on 27 July, in company with Destroyer Division 21 composed of Fred T. Berry, Keppler, Norris, and McCaffery. Reaching Port Said, Egypt, on the morning of 29 July, Worcester transited the Suez Canal that afternoon.

Reaching Colombo for provisions and fuel, Worcester and her escorts remained there from 7 August to 9 August before pushing on towards the Malacca Strait. They then proceeded through the Bashi Channel to Buckner Bay, Okinawa, where they arrived on 19 August. The American warships were diverted through the Bashi Channel to be available to counter any invasion attempt by the communist Chinese of Formosa.

After fueling from Navasota, Worcester departed Buckner Bay on 20 August and set a course for Keelung, Formosa, to join the Formosa Patrol.

Joining that force on 21 August, Worcester remained at anchor at Keelung from 22 through 26 August. She got underway the following day to add her anti-aircraft defense to the screen of Task Force (TF) 77—the fast carrier task force consisting of Philippine Sea and Valley Forge, then operating in the Yellow Sea off the coast of Korea.

On 28 August, the light cruiser—steaming in company with Norris—joined TF 77 and proceeded into the Yellow Sea for operations against enemy targets located in central and southwestern Korea. Each day in the ensuing days, the carriers launched their strikes against North Korean ground targets while the screen protected in case of any attempts by the North Korean air forces to interrupt the operation. Worcester's helicopter also performed plane-guard duty, standing by in the air to rescue any ditched pilots from the waters nearby.

On 4 September, Worcester's radar picked up an unidentified contact. A combat air patrol—four Vought F4U Corsairs from Valley Forge—soon reported the aircraft as being a twin-engine bomber, later identified as being owned by the Soviet Air Force. At 19:45, the F4Us vectored to the "bogey" by Fletcher and shot down the bomber.

The following day, Worcester went to general quarters and commenced maneuvering at 20 knots (37 km/h; 23 mph) to avoid possible attack when her radar picked up an unidentified plane closing the formation from the east. Shortly after, the cruiser fired a warning shot of three 6-inch rounds in the direction of the aircraft—it turned out to be a British Short Sunderland flying boat on patrol. Worcester then secured from battle stations and resumed formation with TF 77.

There was one more day of flight operations off the Korean coast, 6 September, before Worcester transferred her helicopter to Philippine Sea to clear the ship for a practice anti-aircraft firing. The cruiser later recovered the helicopter before heading for Sasebo, Japan, for replenishment of fuel, ammunition, stores, and other provisions.

Worcester remained at Sasebo from 7 to 10 September and got underway on 11 September, again with TF 77, and proceeded to the operation area in the Yellow Sea to support a large-scale amphibious assault by United Nations (UN) forces against enemy forces in the Incheon and Seoul areas of Korea.

Worcester subsequently supported the Inchon landing—an attack aimed at outflanking the North Korean invaders by a strategic landing behind their lines in South Korea, masterminded by General Douglas MacArthur. Worcester screened the fast carrier task forces as their planes dropped lethal loads on North Korean targets ashore until she was detached on 20 September to conduct a shore bombardment mission as part of TG 95.2 in the vicinity of Pohang Dong. Proceeding to the objective via the straits north of Jeju Island and west of Tsushima, the light cruiser rendezvoused with Helena three miles off the east coast of Korea and 12 miles north of Pohang Dong.

Over the following days, Worcester patrolled off the coast with TG 95.2. She relieved heavy cruiser Helena in her fire support duties on 24 September, freeing the heavy cruiser to proceed to Sasebo. While her own helicopter was aloft providing anti-submarine screening, Worcester commenced firing, shelling nine North Korean troop concentrations ashore. Directed by Korean Military Advisory Group (KMAG) personnel ashore, Worcester delivered high accuracy fire throughout the day. Relieved by Samuel N. Moore as fire support ship, Worcester patrolled in company with Brush to seaward of the fire support area for the night.

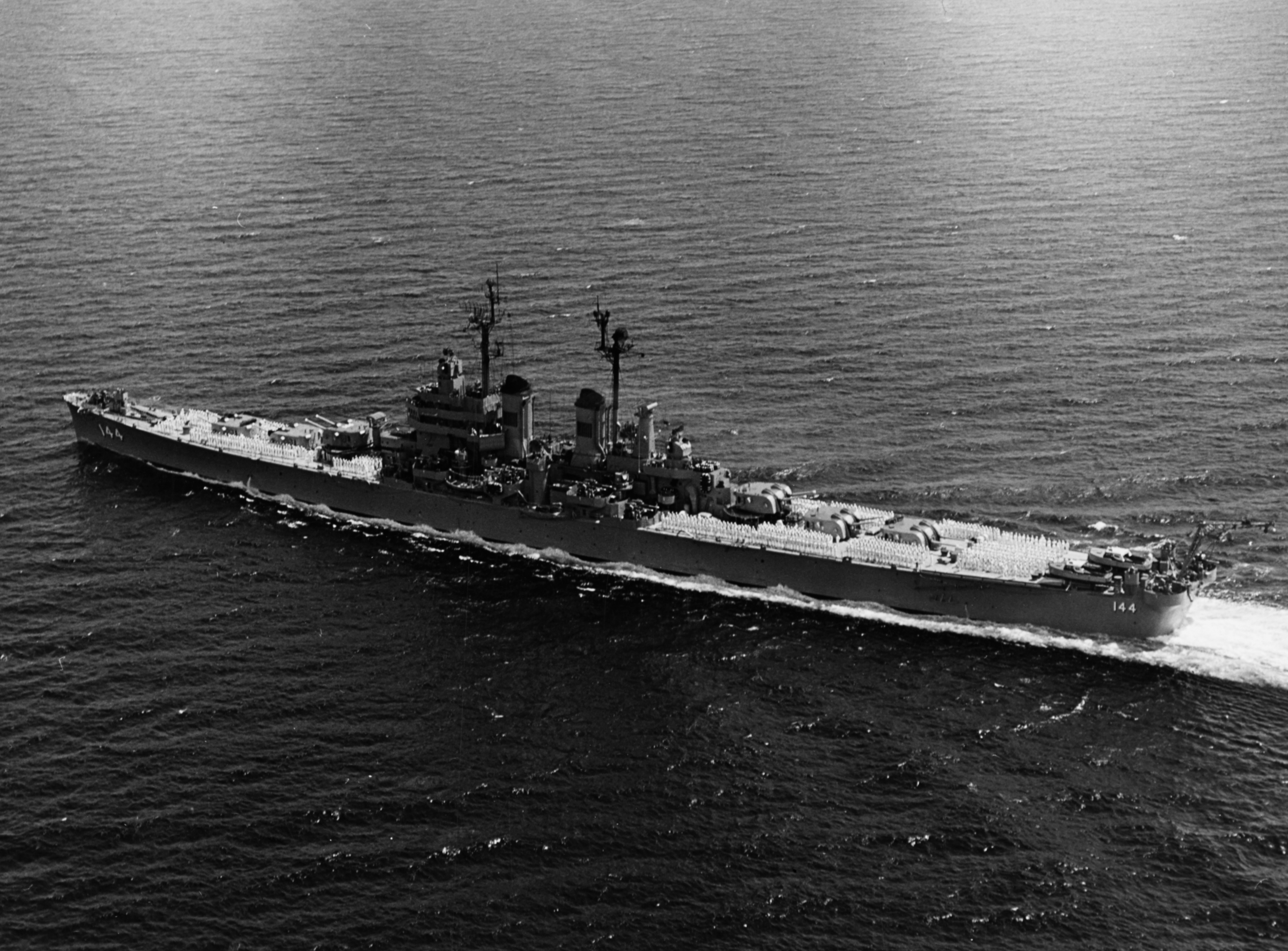
Worcester underway on 31 May 1952.

Worcester returned the following day and resumed her fire support duties, harassing the retreating North Korean forces. Throughout 25 September, Worcester—using KMAG spotting from shore—delivered fire support for the advancing UN forces, breaking up communist troop concentrations with 6-inch fire. As the ship's war diary at one point recorded: "Spotter reported troops dispersed. KMAG reported that all firing has been very effective and instrumental in the enemy retreat."

Worcester spent the night hours on 25 September and into 26 September patrolling eight miles of a stretch of coast between Yonghae and Utchin. The rapid advance of the UN forces on 26 September obviated fire support from Worcester's guns; but the cruiser received word that Brush had hit a naval mine off Tanchon. While Samuel N. Moore took over the on-call fire support duties in the vicinity, Worcester sailed at 27 knots (50 km/h; 31 mph) to Brush's aid.

The cruiser found Brush down by the bow with a port list. There were five dead and 30 injured. On 27 September, Worcester commenced taking on board the more seriously wounded of the destroyer's company via high line transfer, eventually receiving 15 stretcher cases, all men suffering from burns. The cruiser then altered course for Japan and, later that day, took on board four more stretcher patients, six ambulatory patients, and a corpse. At that time, two hospital staff—who had been transferred from Worcester to Brush to tend the wounded on the destroyer—returned to the cruiser.

Proceeding in company with the crippled Brush, Bolster, and De Haven, Worcester headed for Sasebo and reached port on 29 September. As she was being made fast to her buoy in Sasebo harbor, Worcester received a message from the destroyer that she had aided: "With us, you are not only big league but world champions. The kindness, consideration, and eagerness to help of Worcester's ship's company will never be forgotten by the Brush."

The stay in Sasebo, however, proved a short one for Worcester, because she got underway the following day to return to Korean waters to resume her fire support and interdiction duties. At on 1 October, Worcester joined the blockading force off the east coast of Korea, south of the 41st parallel, ready to render gunfire support for UN troops advancing against North Korean forces. As she patrolled off the coast, Worcester launched her helicopter to conduct anti-submarine and anti-mine patrols and frequently stationed lookouts in the bows of the ship, their eyes peeled for mines. Periodically, the screening destroyers found and destroyed mines drifting nearby.

Worcester—having served as flagship for TG 95.2, Rear Admiral Charles C. Hartman embarked—arrived back at Sasebo for replenishment on 8 October and fueled there before disembarking Rear Admiral Hartman. While still at Sasebo, Worcester became a flagship again the next day when Rear Admiral Allan E. Smith, Commander, TF 95 came aboard. On 10 October, Worcester got underway to return to the east coast of Korea—this time to screen minesweeping operations at the port of Wonsan and to support the advance of the 3rd Republic of Korea (ROK) Army Division.

Early on the next day, the British destroyer HMS Cockade, the Australian destroyer HMAS Warramunga, and the Canadian destroyer HMCS Athabaskan joined Worcester's group which already included the British light cruiser HMS Ceylon and the heavy cruiser Helena besides the American warships Rochester, Herbert J. Thomas, and Maddox. On 12 October, the battleship Missouri joined.

Worcester commenced firing at exactly noon on 12 October. For approximately the next 90 minutes, Worcester's 6-inch guns fired at iron works and railroad tunnels in the vicinity. The next day, the target list was extended to include railroad marshaling yards, destroying rolling stock and sections of track.

Over the next few days, Worcester and the ships accompanying her proceeded to fire on targets of opportunity near Wonsan. On 16 October, Worcester, Helena, and accompanying destroyers fired at unidentified radar contacts from the north.

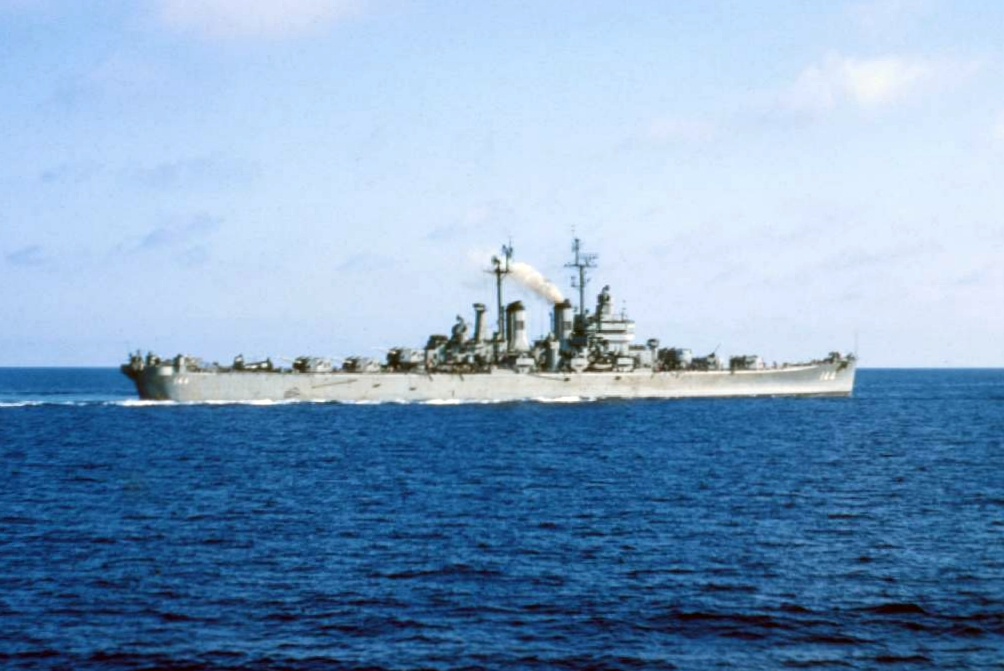
Worcester underway in the Mediterranean Sea, 1953.

After returning to Sasebo, Worcester returned briefly to Wonsan to transfer mail, passengers, and her helicopter unit to Rochester on 21 October, before she sailed from Wonsan in company with Helena and screened by Southerland and English. Joined later by Collett, Worcester parted company with the others and, escorted by Collett, headed for Sasebo where, upon arrival, Rear Admiral Smith disembarked and transferred his flag to the destroyer tender Dixie.

Worcester completed the transfer of helicopter personnel, spares, and equipment to Fleet Activities Sasebo, and, on 23 October, headed for Yokosuka. She arrived two days later. After replenishment and the cleaning of two boilers, the light cruiser left the Far East on 27 October, bound for Pearl Harbor. The day after she sailed, Worcester received a dispatch from Admiral C. Turner Joy, Commander, Naval Forces, Far East, which said: "Upon the Worcester's departure from the Far East I wish to extend a hearty 'well done' to the entire ship's company. Your rapid deployment from the European station to the Far East, followed by your immediate and most effective participation in the Korean effort, clearly demonstrates that your status of war readiness was excellent."

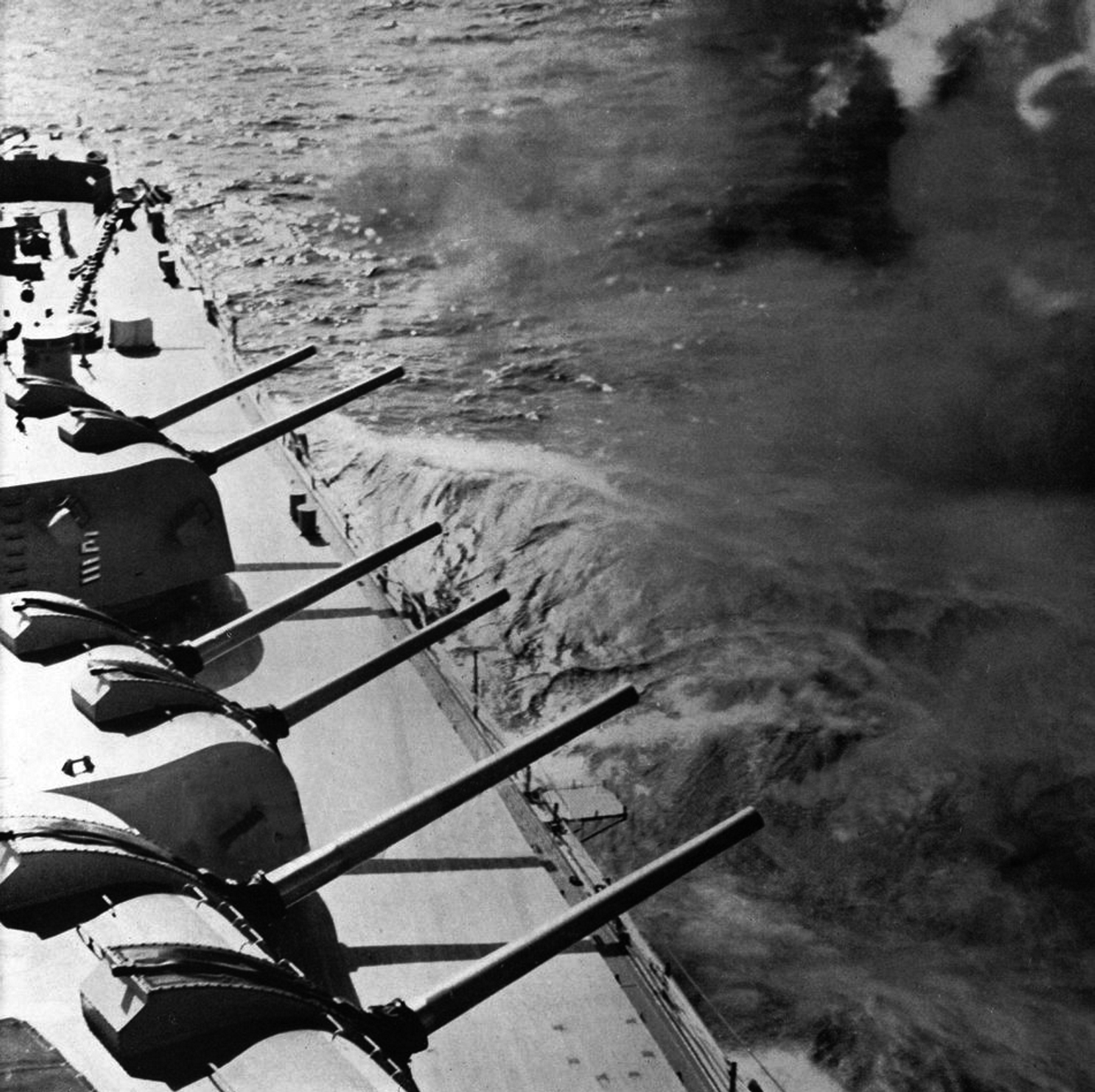
Worcester fires her forward 6-inch (152 mm) guns, circa 1957.

Returning to Philadelphia on 21 November, Worcester spent six days at Norfolk before she was overhauled at the Boston Naval Shipyard from 1 December 1950 to 20 March 1951. After another brief period at Norfolk from 22 to 30 March, the light cruiser operated at Guantanamo Bay on refresher training for nearly a month before she headed back to Norfolk. Departing that port on 15 May, Worcester headed for the Mediterranean and her third deployment to the 6th Fleet.

Worcester conducted four more 6th Fleet deployments into the mid-1950s and twice visited northern European ports. During that time, she participated in fleet maneuvers and exercises in many ports ranging from Bergen, Norway; to Copenhagen, Denmark; to Dublin, Ireland; and Portsmouth, England. Between her foreign deployments were operations on the east coast: local operations out of ports like Boston and Norfolk.

Transferred from the Atlantic to the Pacific Fleet in January 1956, Worcester made two more deployments to operate with the 7th Fleet, visiting such highly frequented ports as Sasebo and Yokosuka, Japan; Hong Kong; Manila; as well as the Japanese ports of Hakodate, Nagasaki, Shimoda, Yokohama, and Kobe. Returning each time to her home port at Long Beach, California, the ship conducted local operations between her cruises in Pacific waters.

=== Decommissioning ===
After her final deployment, Worcester left Long Beach on 2 September 1958 and sailed to Mare Island Naval Shipyard to begin the process of being taken out of service. She was decommissioned on 19 December 1958 and placed in reserve the same day. The ship was later moored at San Francisco and then at Bremerton, Washington. Worcester was removed from the Naval Vessel Register on 1 December 1970.

On 5 July 1972, the ship was sold to Zidell Explorations, Inc., of Portland, Oregon, and was subsequently dismantled for scrap. Although built as an antiaircraft light cruiser, Worcester never saw combat in her intended role.

About 200 tons (approximately 180 metric tonnes) of her armor plate were sent to the Fermi National Accelerator Laboratory in Batavia, Illinois, where the material is used as shielding for scientific experiments involving high-energy particles.

The ship's bell has been preserved and is on display on the first floor near the rear entrance of Worcester City Hall.

== Gallery ==
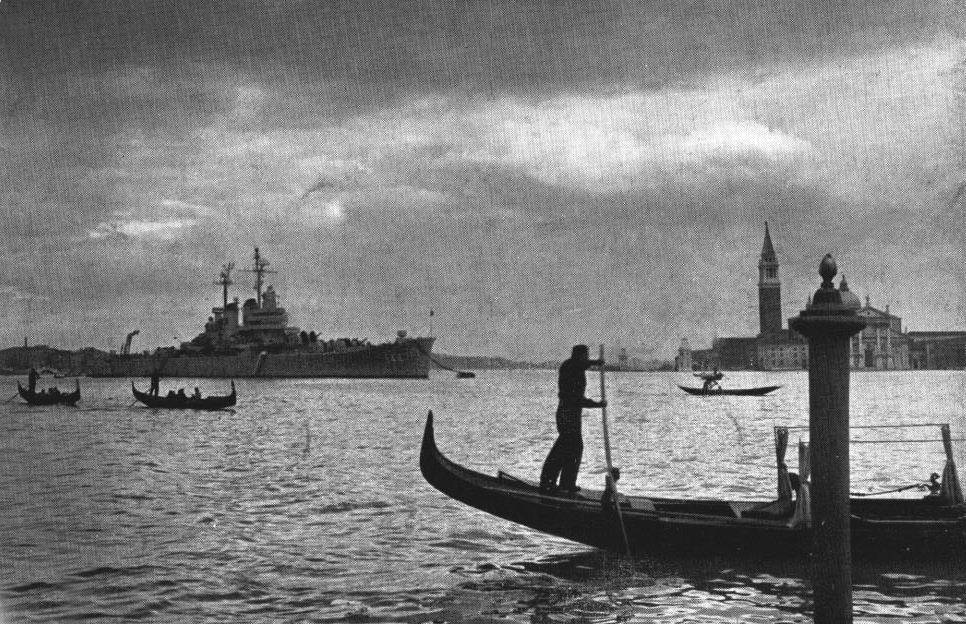
Worcester at Venice, Italy in 1949

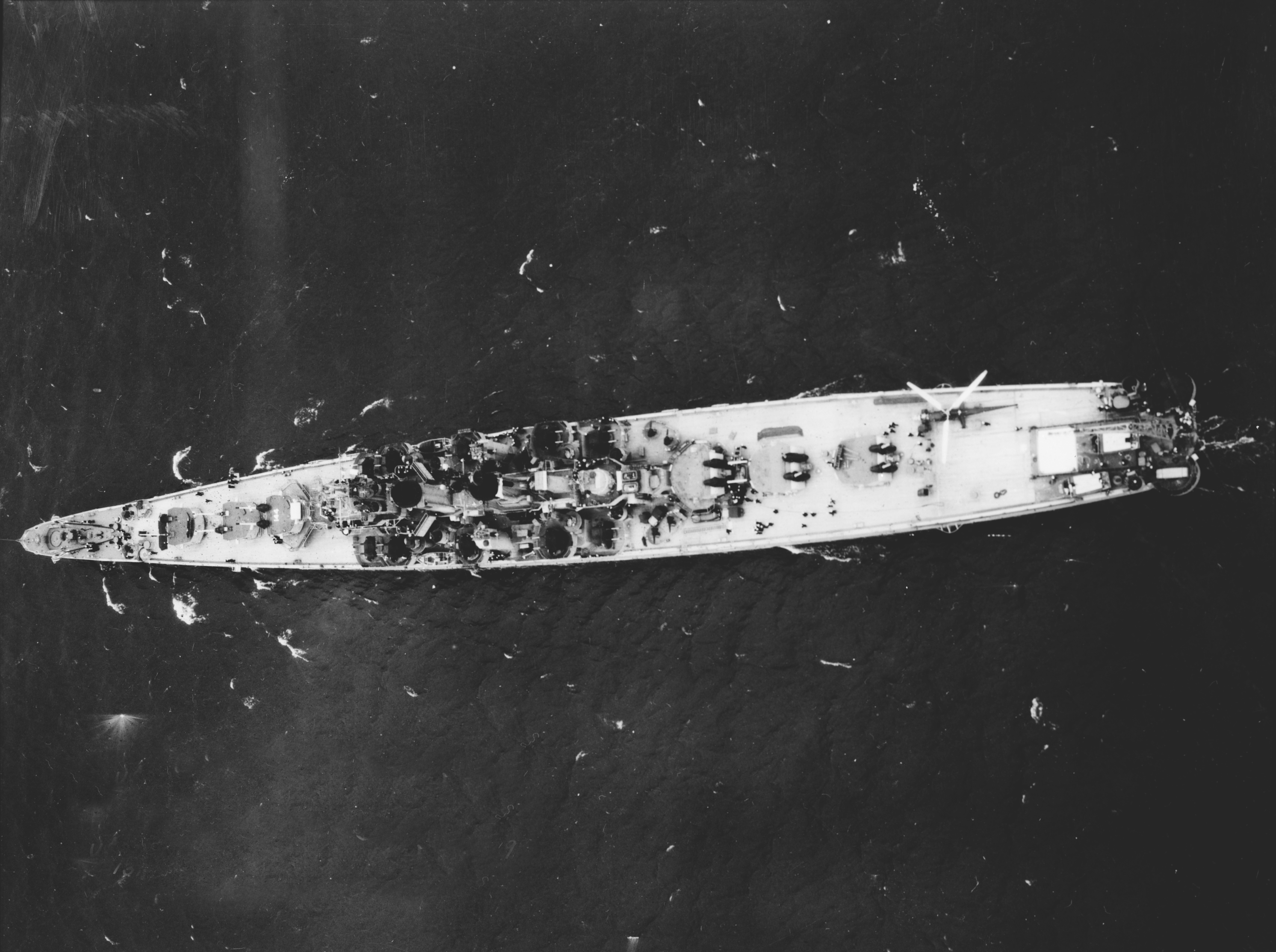
Worcester in May, 1949

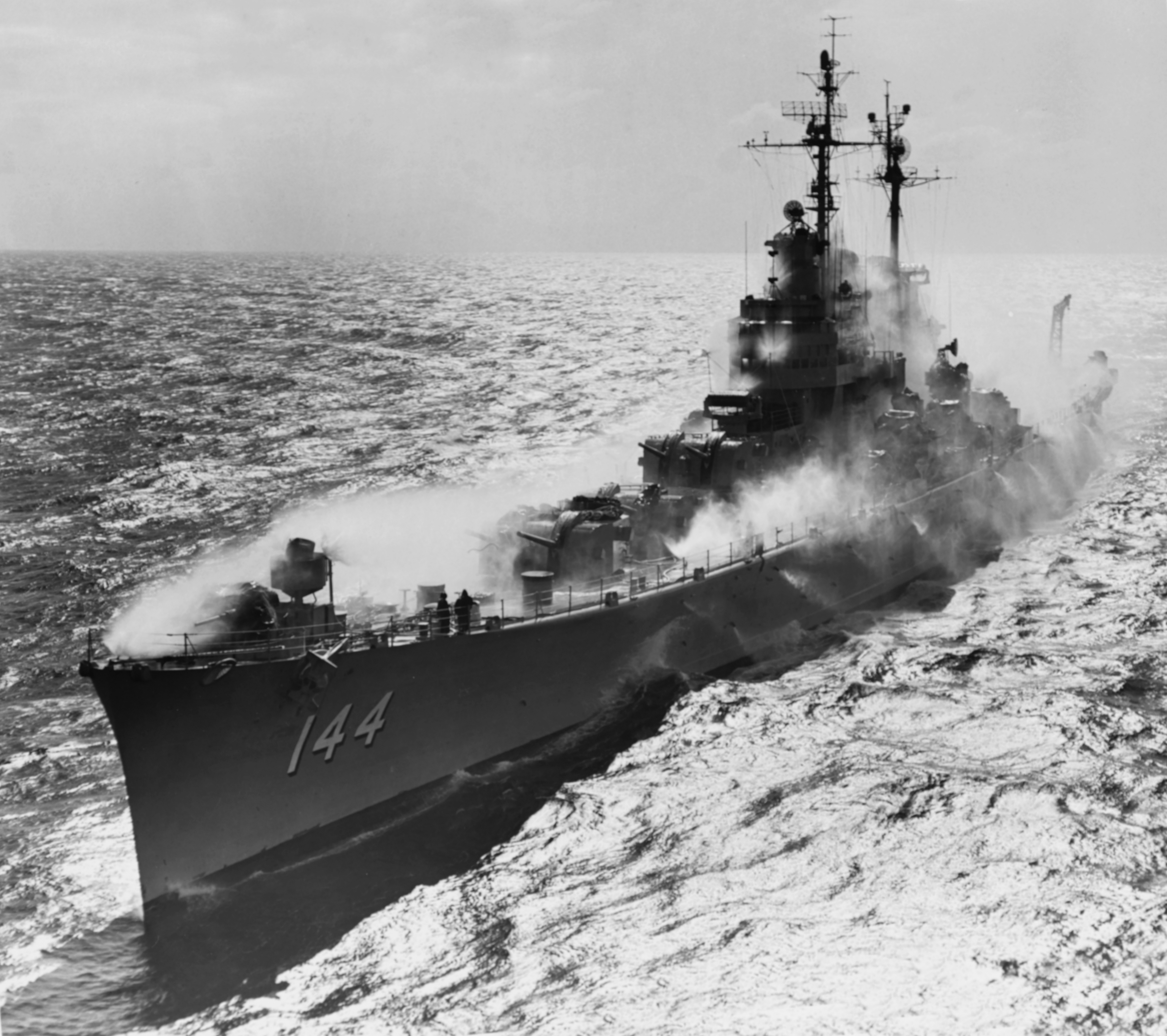
Worcester testing her anti-nuclear radiation washdown system on 7 July 1954

== Awards ==
- Combat Action Ribbon
- China Service Medal
- World War 2 Navy Occupation Medal with "Asia" and "Europe" clasps
- National Defense Service Medal
- Korean Service Medal with 2 awards
- Republic of Korea Presidential Unit Citation
- United Nations Korea Medal
- Republic of Korea War Service Medal
