= Worcester-class cruiser =

American warship class (1945–1958)

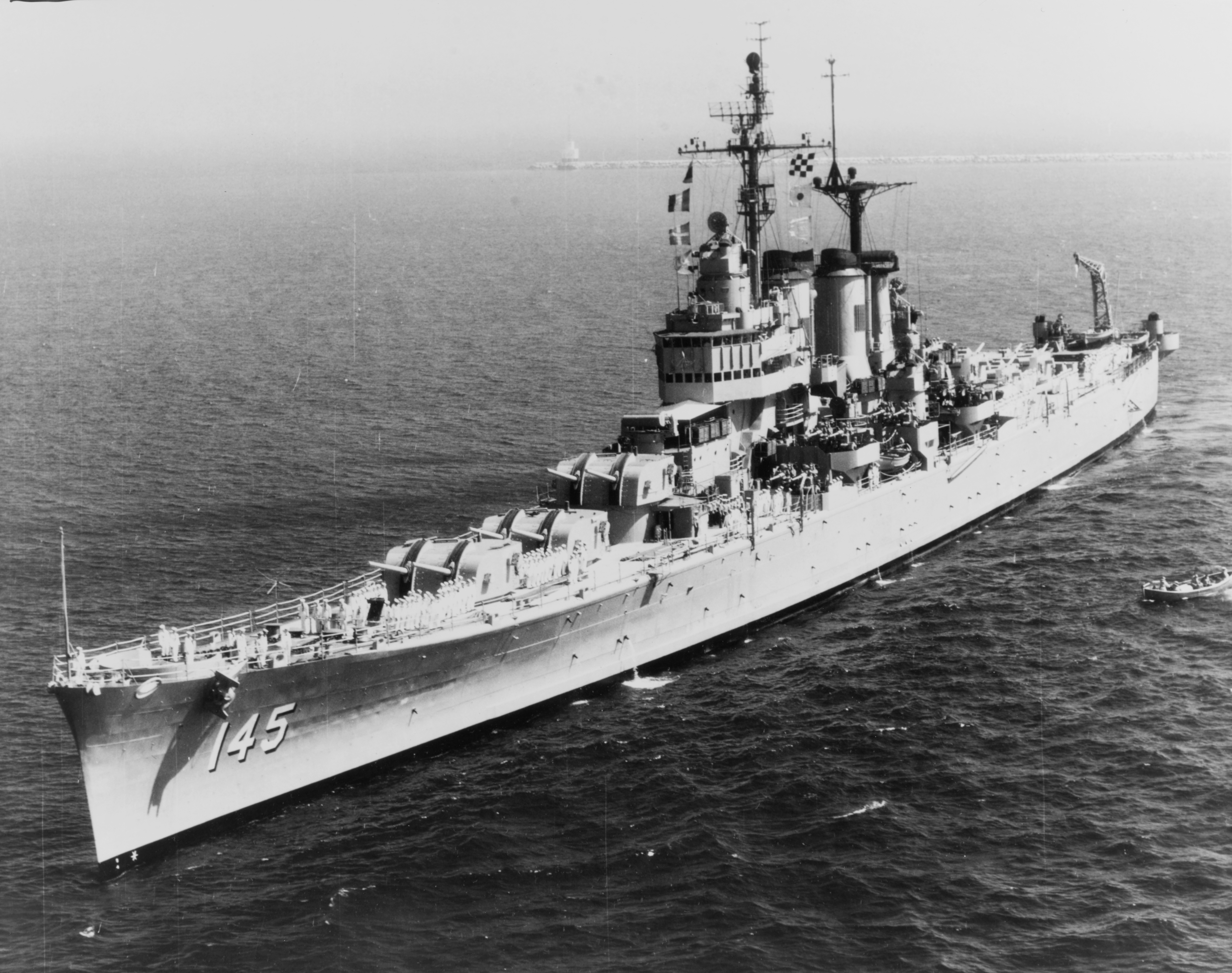
- USS Roanoke in 1950s

Class overview
- Name: Worcester-class
- Builders: New York Shipbuilding Corporation
- Operators: United States Navy
- Preceded by: Fargo class
- Succeeded by: None
- Subclasses: None
- Built: 1945–1947
- In commission: 1948–58
- Planned: 10
- Completed: 2
- Canceled: 8
- Retired: 2
- Preserved: 0

General characteristics
- Type: Light cruiser
- Displacement: 14,700 long tons (14,936 t) (standard); 17,997 long tons (18,286 t) (full)
- Length: 664 ft (202 m) wl; 679 ft 6 in (207.11 m) oa
- Beam: 70 ft .5 in (21.3 m)
- Draft: 25 ft (7.6 m)
- Propulsion: 4 × Westinghouse 620 psi boilers; 4 × geared steam turbines; 4 × screws; 125,000 Horsepower
- Speed: 33 knots
- Boats & landing craft carried: 2–4 × lifeboats
- Complement: 1,560 officers and enlisted
- Sensors & processing systems: AN/SPS-10 surface-search radar; AN/SPS-6 air-search radar; AN/SPS-8A height-finding radar; AN/URD-4 radio direction finder; AN/URN-3 TACAN; AN/SLR-2 ECM Receiver; Mark 56 fire-control system
- Armament: 6 × dual 6-inch/47-caliber guns; 11 × dual 3-inch/50-caliber guns; 2 × single 3"/50 caliber Mark 34 guns
- Armor: belt: 3–5 in (76–127 mm); deck: 3.5 in (89 mm) (max); turrets: 2–6.5 in (51–165 mm); barbettes: 5 in (127 mm); conning tower: 4.5 in (114 mm)
- Aviation facilities: 2 × aircraft catapults

The Worcester class was a class of light cruisers used by the United States Navy, laid down in 1945 and commissioned in 1948–49. They and their contemporaries, the Des Moines-class heavy cruisers, were the last all-gun cruisers built for the U.S. Navy. Ten ships were planned for this class, but only two (USS Worcester (CL-144) and USS Roanoke (CL-145)) were completed.

The main battery layout was distinctive, with twin rather than triple turrets, unlike the previous Cleveland-class, St. Louis-class, and Brooklyn-class light cruisers. Aside from the Worcesters' main battery consisting of 6 in (152 mm) rather than 5 in (127 mm) guns, the layout was identical to the much smaller Juneau-class light cruisers, carrying 12 guns in six turrets, three forward and three aft, with only turrets 3 and 4 superfiring. The 6-inch/47-caliber gun was an autoloading, high-angle dual-purpose gun with a high rate of fire, and the Worcesters were thus designed to serve as AA cruisers like the Juneaus but with much more potent guns, as well as conventional light cruisers.

Both ships were decommissioned in 1958, the last conventional light cruisers to serve in the fleet, and scrapped in the early 1970s.

== Design ==
The Worcester class was designed as a departure from the Cleveland-class and Fargo-class cruisers, and an expansion of the Atlanta and Juneau classes. They carried six twin dual-purpose 6-inch/47-caliber gun turrets on the center-line, of which turrets three and four were superimposed. They carried 24 3"/50 cal AA in eleven twin mounts and two single mounts. Fire-control equipment included four high-angle/low-angle director control towers (DCTs) and two low-angle DCTs, which were arranged in a diamond-shaped pattern. Their armor was a 3–6" belt, a 3" main deck, a 2" lower deck, 3–4" bulkheads, 4" turrets and barbettes, and a 6.5" conning tower. Four Babcock & Wilcox boilers with four shafts and General Electric geared turbines provided 120,000 S.H.P., which could propel these ships at 32.75 knots.

== Ships in class ==
| Ship Name | Hull No. | Builder | Laid Down | Launched | Commissioned | Decommissioned | Fate |
|---|---|---|---|---|---|---|---|
| Worcester | CL-144 | New York Shipbuilding Corporation, Camden, New Jersey | 29 January 1945 | 4 February 1947 | 26 June 1948 | 19 December 1958 | Struck 1 December 1970; Sold to Zidell Explorations, Inc., of Portland, OR on 5 July 1972 |
| Roanoke | CL-145 | New York Shipbuilding Corporation, Camden, New Jersey | 15 May 1945 | 16 June 1947 | 4 April 1949 | 31 October 1958 | Struck 1 December 1970; Sold to Levin Metals Corporation of San Jose, Calif. on 22 February 1972 |
| Vallejo | CL-146 | New York Shipbuilding Corporation, Camden, New Jersey | 16 July 1945 | — | | | Construction cancelled 8 December 1945; hull was subsequently scrapped |
| Gary | CL-147 | New York Shipbuilding Corporation, Camden, New Jersey | — | — | | | Cancelled 12 August 1945 prior to the start of construction |

== See also ==
- CL-154-class cruiser, an abortive contemporary design
- Minotaur-class cruiser (1947), a Royal Navy design similar in concept.
- List of cruisers of the United States Navy
