= JDS Yukikaze =

Destroyer of the Japan Maritime Self-Defense Force

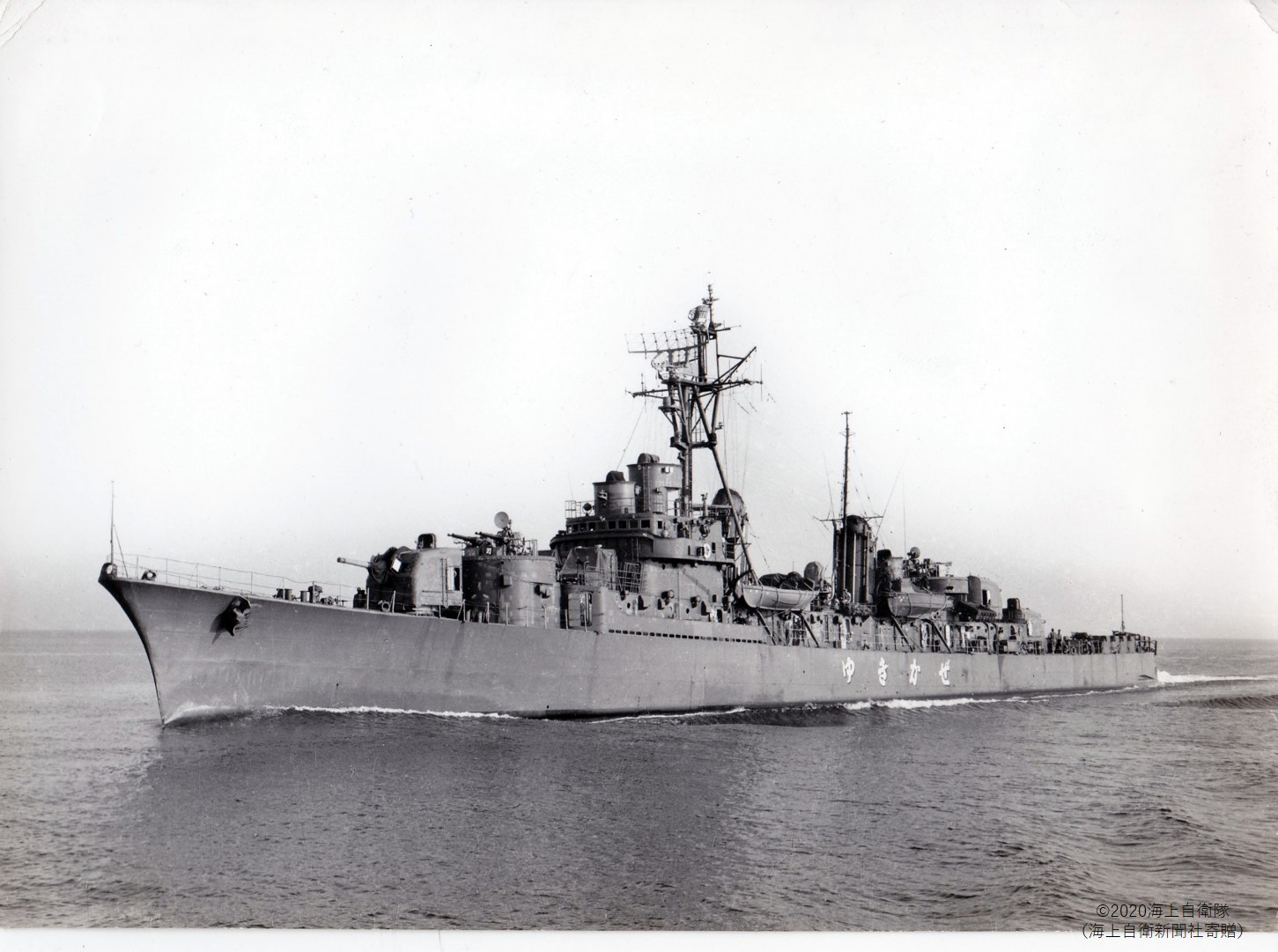
- JDS Yukikaze

History

Japan
- Name: Yukikaze; (ゆきかぜ)
- Namesake: Yukikaze (1939)
- Ordered: 1953
- Builder: Mitsubishi Shipbuilding & Eng.; Nagasaki Shipyard
- Laid down: 17 December 1954
- Launched: 20 August 1955
- Commissioned: 31 July 1956
- Decommissioned: 27 March 1985
- Reclassified: Training ship, 27 March 1981
- Home port: Yokosuka (1956-1971); Sasebo (1971-1973); Yokosuka (1973-1985)
- Identification: DD-102; ASU-7003
- Fate: Sunk as target, August 1985

General characteristics
- Class & type: Harukaze-class destroyer
- Displacement: 1,700 t (1,673 long tons) standard; 2,340 t (2,303 long tons) full load
- Length: 106.0 m (347.8 ft)
- Beam: 10.5 m (34 ft)
- Depth: 6.4 m (21 ft)
- Propulsion: 2 × Steam turbines (15,000ps); 2 × shafts
- Speed: 30 knots (56 km/h; 35 mph)
- Complement: 240
- Sensors & processing systems: AN/SPS-6 air search radar; OPS-3 surface-search radar; QHBa sonar; (Later AN/SQS-26J); QDA sonar
- Electronic warfare & decoys: OLR-3; (Later OLR-4); Acoustic torpedo
- Armament: 3 × 5-inch/38 caliber Mk.12 guns; 8 × Bofors 40 mm anti-aircraft guns; 2 × Hedgehog anti-submarine mortars; 8 × K-gun depth charge throwers; 1 × Depth charge rack

JDS Yukikaze (DD-102) was the second ship of Harukaze-class destroyers, and the second destroyer of the Japanese Maritime Self Defense Force to be built in Japan since the end of World War II.

== Construction and career ==
The ship was laid down at the Mitsubishi shipyard in Nagasaki on 17 December 1954, launched on 20 August 1955 and commissioned on 31 July 1956 with the hull number (DD-102). She was put into service on 31 July, and was incorporated into the Yokosuka District Force.

On 1 April 1957, Yukikaze became the flagship of the 2nd Self-Defense Fleet and the flagship of the 1st Escort Group in place of the guard ship JDS Keyaki.

From 10 January to 26 March 1959, a special renovation work was carried out at the Ishikawajima Heavy Industries Tokyo Factory, and four rear depth charge projectors and one depth charge projection rail were removed, and Mk.2 was short. Equipped with one torpedo launcher on each side. Replaced anti-submarine active sonar from QHBa to SQS-11A and passive sonar from QDA to SQR-4 / SQA-4. Replaced the 5-inch gun fire control system from Mk.51 to Mk.57. In addition, construction work was carried out, such as the installation of a new identification friend or foe device, the replacement of the electronic warfare device from OLR-3 to OLR-4, and the installation of air conditioning and ventilation equipment in the battle compartment rooms. On 1 July, the same year, the Self-Defense Fleet Command abolished the concurrent role of the 1st Escort Group Command, and along with this, Yukikaze became the flagship under the direct control of the Self-Defense Fleet.

In February 1960, an offshore refueling device was installed. From 18 May to 22 July of the same year, she participated in the 4th pelagic practice voyage and visited Hawaii and the west coast of the United States.

On 26 July 1961, Yukikaze was relieved as flagship of the Self-Defense Fleet by the destroyer JDS Akizuki, and transferred to the 1st Escort Group as their flagship.

In 1963, Yukikaze became a filming location for the 1964 movie Destroyer Yukikaze (駆逐艦雪風), masquerading as the predecessor destroyer Yukikaze.

On 10 December 1964, Yukikaze was incorporated into the 3rd Escort Group as a flagship and the fixed port was transferred to Maizuru.

In March 1969, Maizuru Heavy Industries carried out a modernization renovation to replace the sonar with SQS-29J.

On 1 February 1971, she was transferred to the 12th Escort Corps, which was newly formed under the 3rd Escort Corps group along with the consort ship JDS Harukaze, and the fixed port was also transferred to Sasebo. This was the first time that both ships had formed an escort.

On 16 December 1973, the 12th Escort Corps was abolished and transferred to the Practical Experiment Corps. The fixed port is transferred to Yokosuka again.

In response to the Yuyo Maru No.10 Incident that had occurred on 9 November 1974, Yukikaze, along with the escort vessels Haruna, Takatsuki, Narushio and Mochizuki, was dispatched on 26 November. Yukikaze arrived at the scene and fired to sink the stricken Yuyo Maru No.10 from the 27th to the 28th of the following day.

In January 1976, Yukikaze underwent refitting for practical testing at Sumitomo Heavy Industries Uraga Shipyard, and the 5-inch No. 3 turret, the depth charge projector K gun and the depth charge drop rail were removed. A towed passive sonar was equipped on her stern, and from this point, she had been engaged in practical experiments of towed passive sonar.

On 1 July 1978, the Practical Experiment Team was integrated into the Development Guidance Group, and the ship belongs to the same group.

On 27 March 1981, she was converted to a training auxiliary ship, and the ship hull number was changed to (ASU-7003).

Yukikaze was decommissioned on 27 March 1985, and was sunk off Noto Peninsula as a target in August 1985.

== Gallery ==
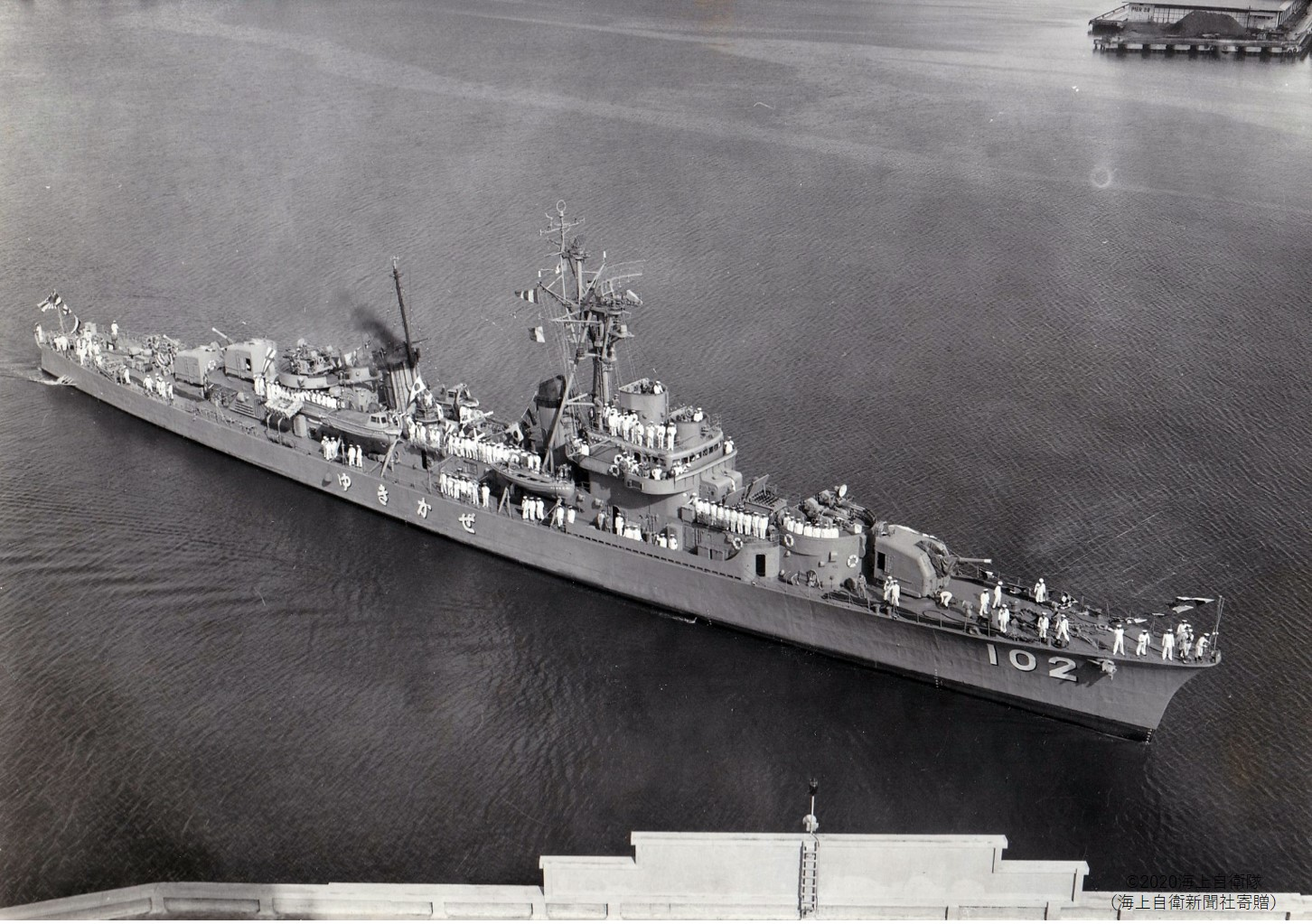

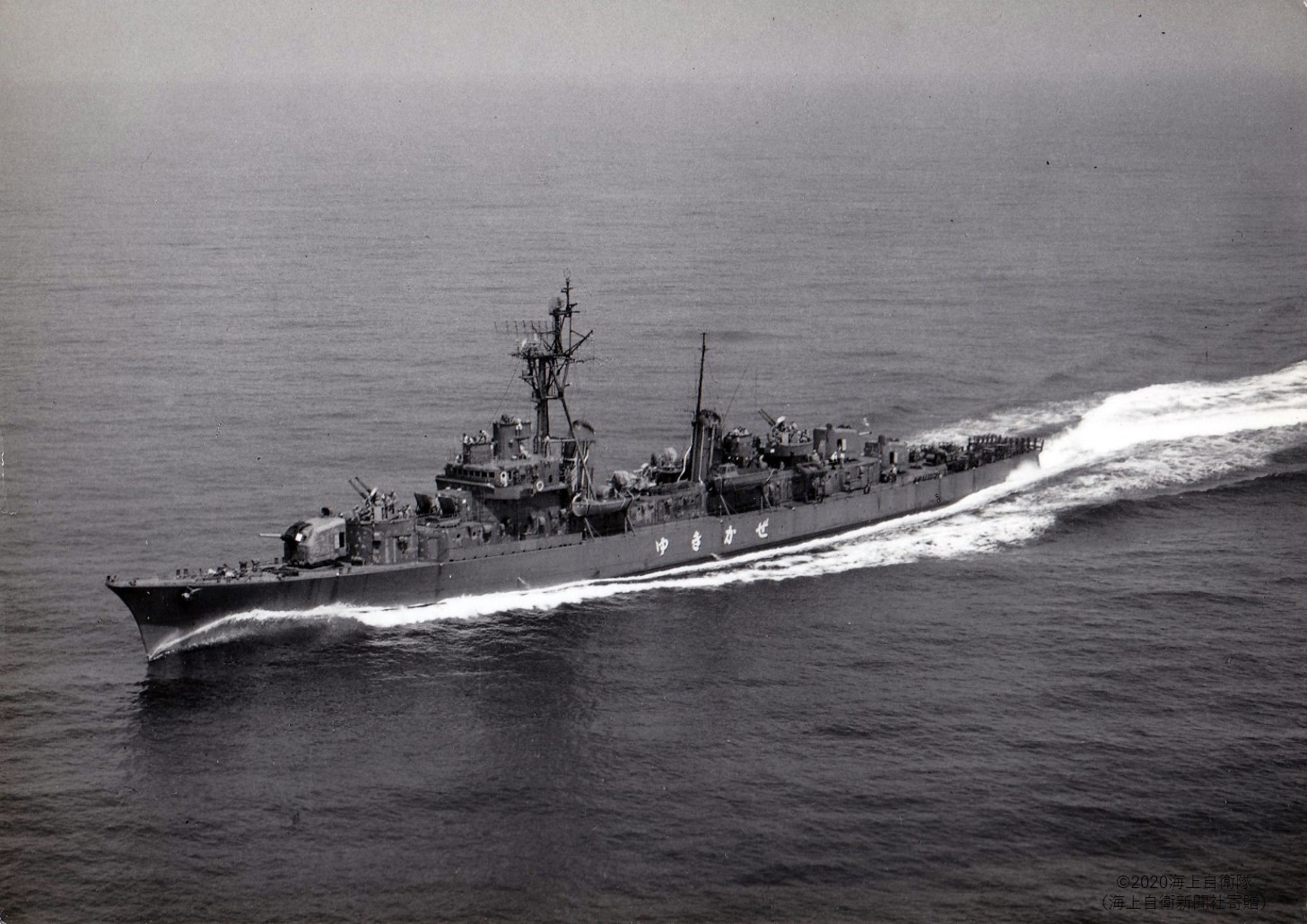

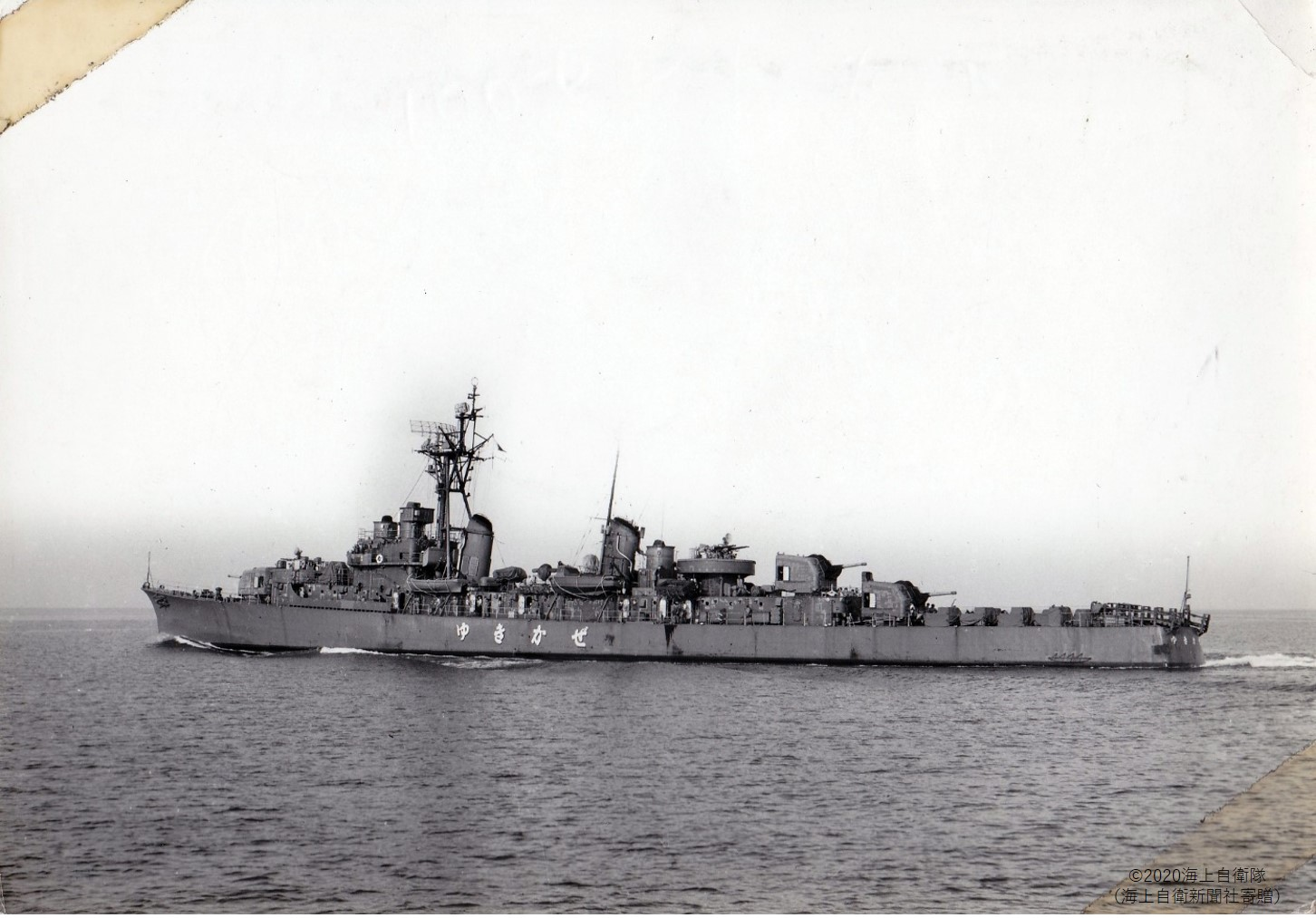

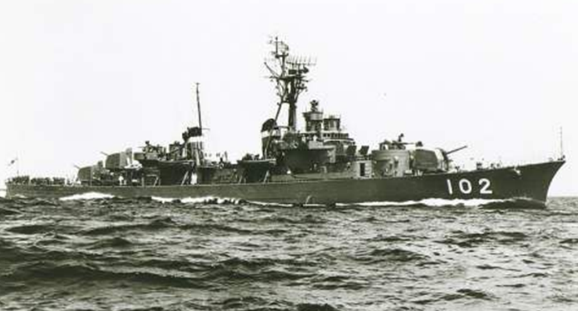
