= JDS Harukaze =

Destroyer of the Japan Maritime Self-Defense Force

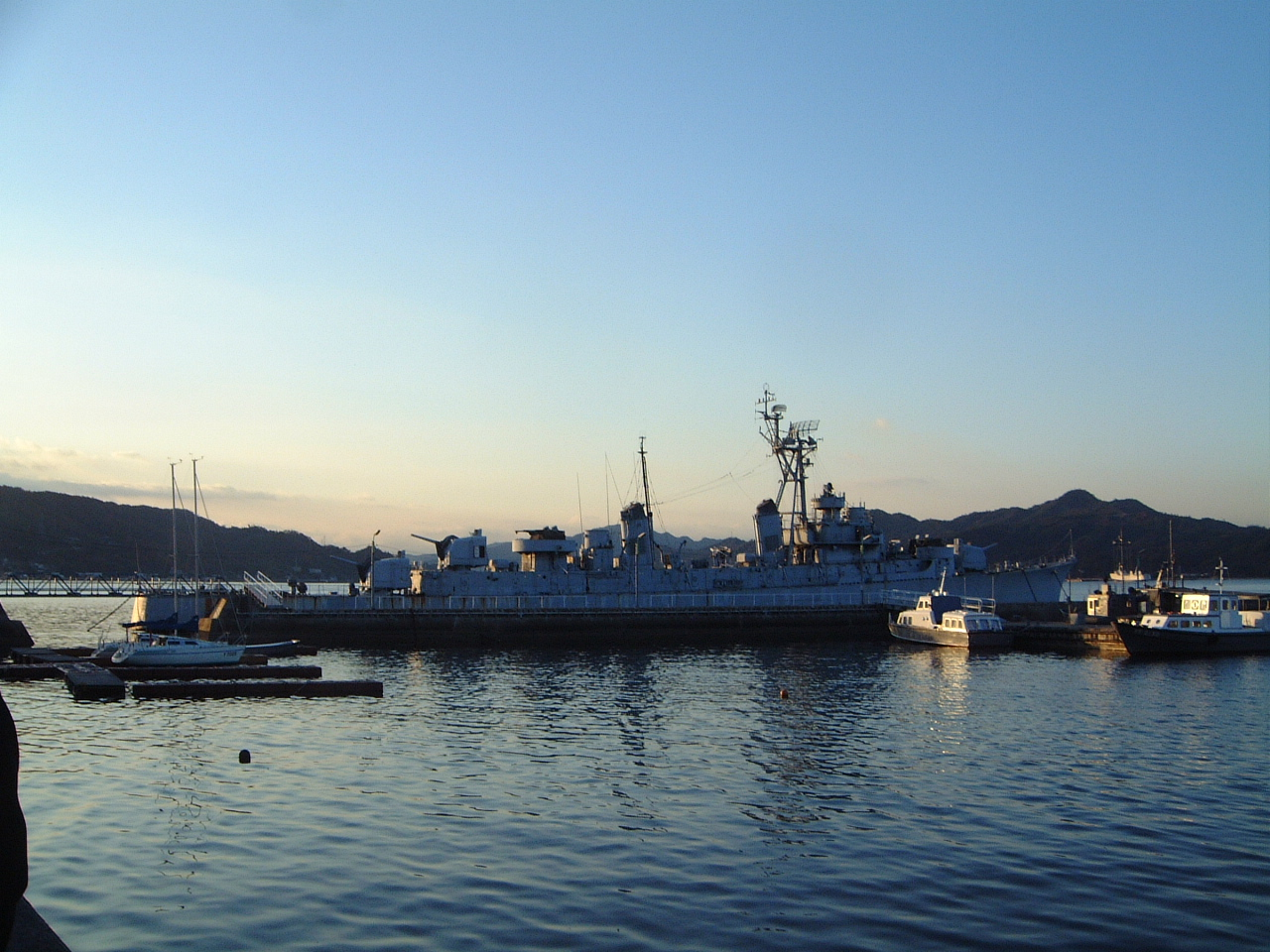
- JDS Harukaze in 2000.

History

Japan
- Name: Harukaze; (はるかぜ)
- Namesake: Spring wind
- Ordered: 1953
- Builder: Mitsubishi Shipbuilding & Eng.; Nagasaki Shipyard
- Laid down: 15 December 1954
- Launched: 20 September 1955
- Commissioned: 26 April 1956
- Decommissioned: 5 March 1985
- Reclassified: Training ship, 27 March 1981
- Home port: Sasebo (1956-1958); Yokosuka (1958-1985)
- Identification: DD-101; ASU-7002
- Fate: Scrapped

General characteristics
- Class & type: Harukaze-class destroyer
- Displacement: 1,700 t (1,673 long tons) standard; 2,340 t (2,303 long tons) full load
- Length: 106.0 m (347.8 ft)
- Beam: 10.5 m (34 ft)
- Depth: 6.4 m (21 ft)
- Propulsion: 2 × Steam turbines (15,000ps); 2 × shafts
- Speed: 30 knots (56 km/h; 35 mph)
- Complement: 240
- Sensors & processing systems: AN/SPS-6 air search radar; OPS-3 surface-search radar; QHBa sonar; (Later AN/SQS-26J); QDA sonar
- Electronic warfare & decoys: OLR-3; (Later OLR-4); Acoustic torpedo
- Armament: 3 × 5-inch/38 caliber Mk.12 guns; 8 × Bofors 40 mm anti-aircraft guns; 2 × Hedgehog anti-submarine mortars; 8 × K-gun depth charge throwers; 1 × Depth charge rack

JDS Harukaze (DD-101) was the lead ship of Harukaze-class destroyers, and the first destroyer of the Japanese Maritime Self Defense Force to be built in Japan since the end of World War II.

== Construction and career ==
The ship was laid down at the Mitsubishi shipyard in Nagasaki on 15 December 1954, launched on 20 September 1955 and commissioned on 26 April 1956 with the hull number (DD-101). She was put into service on 26 April, and was incorporated into the Sasebo District Force.

On 1 April 1957, it was incorporated into the 2nd Escort Group as a flagship.

From 14 January to 25 February 1958, the Maritime Self-Defense Force's first pelagic training voyage to Hawaii was carried out by the training fleet, participating as a flagship, from 6 August to 10 October of the same year. He also participated as a flagship in the second pelagic training voyage to Hawaii and North America held on the same day. At the time of regular repairs carried out in March of the same year, the 5-inch gun fire control system was replaced from Mk.51 with a Swiss contrabass fire control system. In addition, on 1 April, the same year, it was incorporated into the 1st Escort Group as a flagship, and her homeport was transferred to Yokosuka.

From 20 January to 20 March 1959, a large-scale armament repair was carried out at Mitsubishi Heavy Industries Nagasaki Shipyard & Machinery Works, and four rear depth charge projectors and one depth charge projection rail were removed. Equipped with one Mk2 short torpedo depth charge on each side. The anti-submarine active sonar was changed from QHBa to SQS-11A, and the passive sonar was changed from QDA to SQR-4 / SQA-4. In addition, construction work was carried out, such as the installation of a new identification friend or foe device, the replacement of the electronic warfare device from OLR-3 to OLR-4, and the installation of air conditioning and ventilation equipment in the battle compartment rooms.

In February 1960, an offshore refueling device was installed.

On 1 February 1961, it was incorporated into the 2nd Escort Group as a flagship, and the fixed port was transferred to Sasebo again.

In March 1967, the sonar was replaced with SQS-30.

Transferred to the Sasebo District Force on 15 October 1969 (Showa 44).

On 1 February 1971, he was transferred to the 12th escort corps, which was newly formed under the 3rd escort corps group, together with JDS Yukikaze. This was the first time that both ships had formed an escort.

On 16 December 1973, the 12th Escort Corps was abolished, and it was transferred to the 1st Submarine Corps as a ship under direct control, and the fixed port was also transferred to Wu. In order to engage in submarine training support missions, the stern depth charge projector and depth charge drop rails were removed, and training torpedo collection dabits and torpedo loading mounts were installed.

On 27 March 1981, she was changed to a training auxiliary ship, and the ship hull number was changed to (ASU-7002).

She was decommissioned on 5 March 1985.

Until November 2001, it was moored and stored at the Maritime Self-Defense Force 1st Service School as a special pier, but it was sold due to significant damage caused by salt damage, and it was dismantled after leaving the area on the 19th of the same month.

== Gallery ==
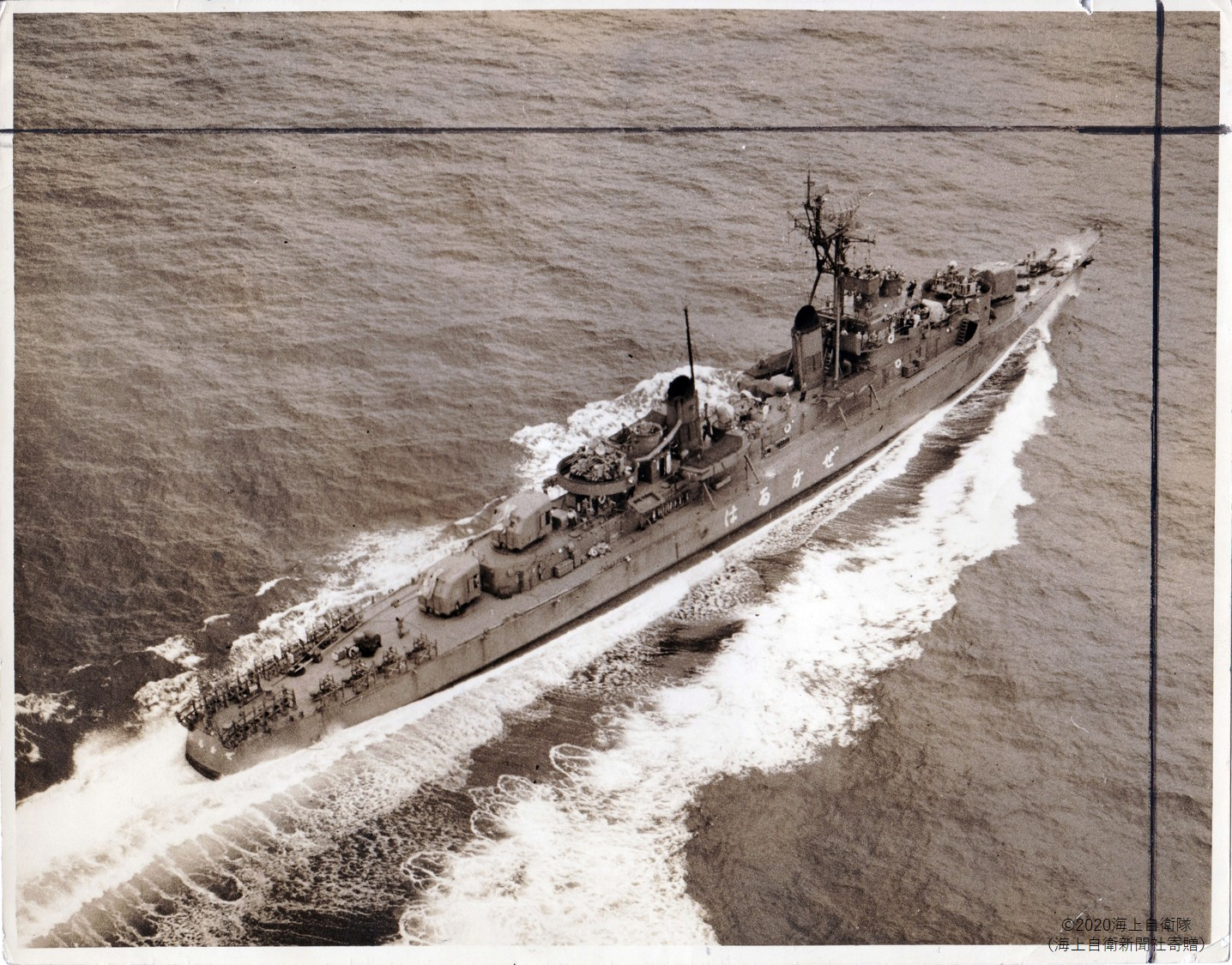

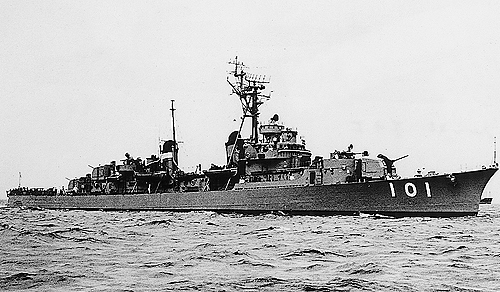

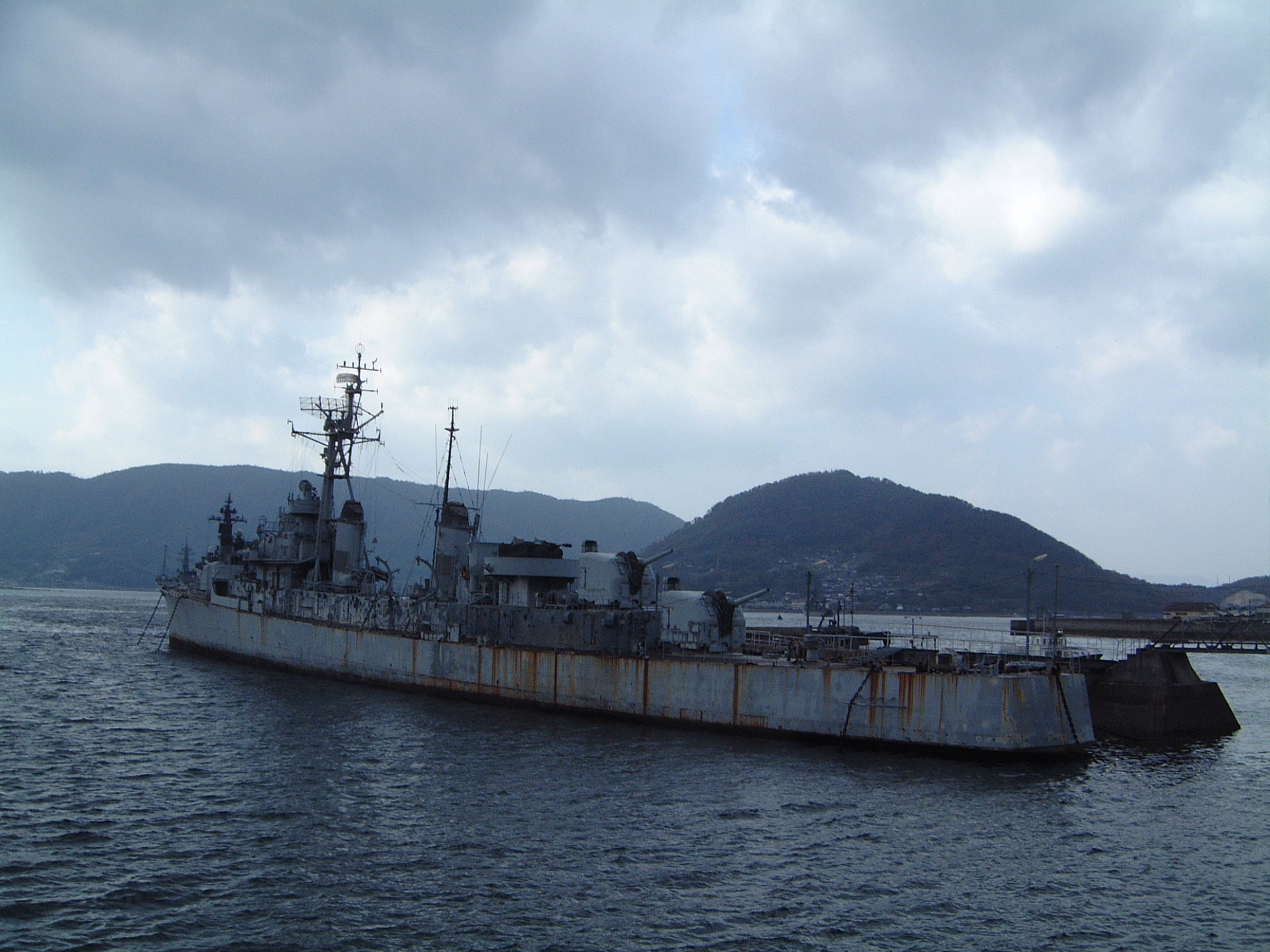
JDS Harukaze as a training ship on 5 December 2000
