= Harukaze-class destroyer =

1955 class of Japanese destroyers

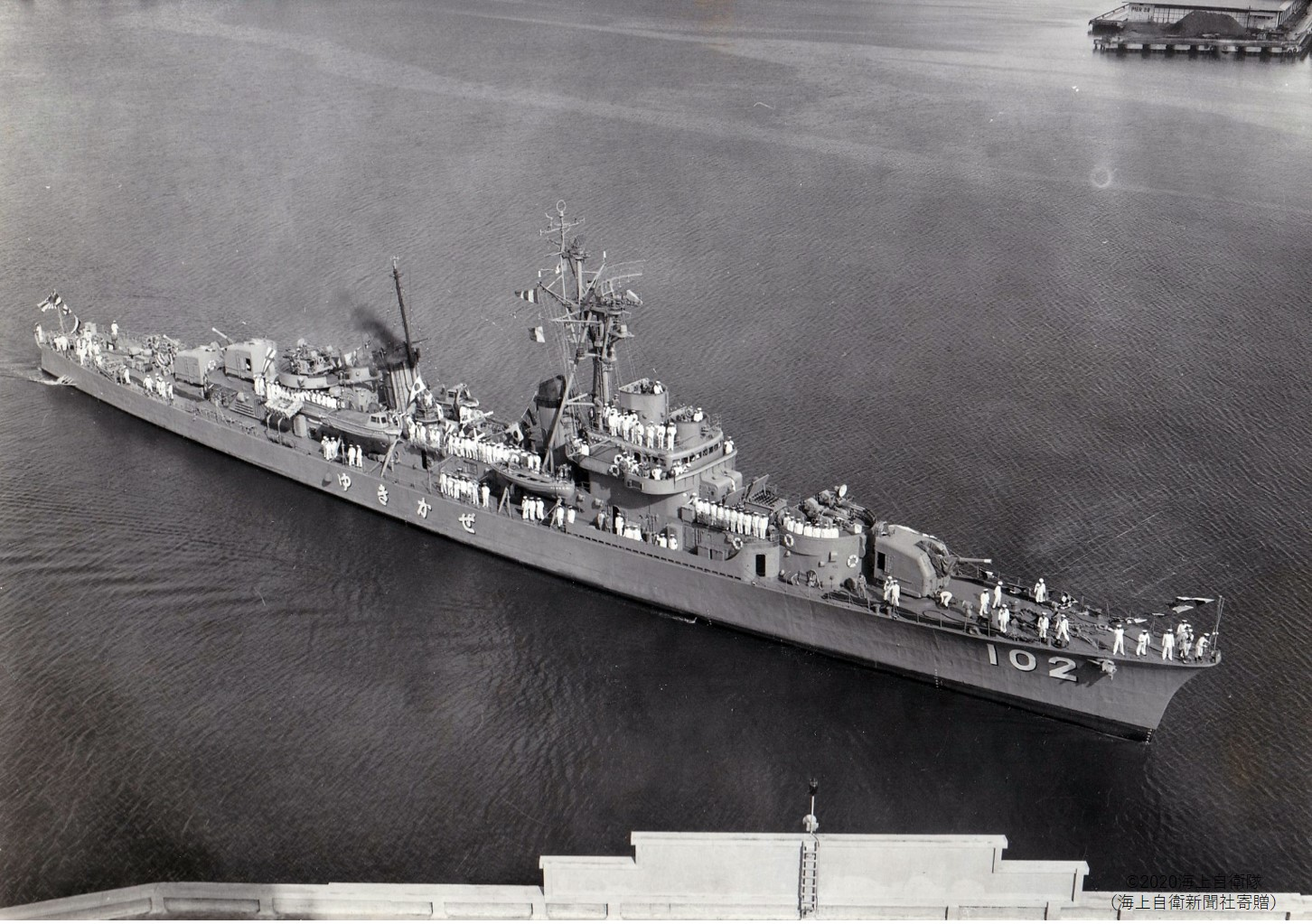
- JDS Yukikaze

Class overview
- Name: Harukaze class
- Builders: Mitsubishi Shipbuilding & Eng.; Nagasaki Shipyard (2)
- Operators: Japan Maritime Self-Defense Force
- Preceded by: Ariake class
- Succeeded by: Ayanami class
- Built: 1954–1955
- In commission: 1956–1985
- Completed: 2
- Retired: 2

General characteristics
- Type: Destroyer
- Displacement: 1,700 t (1,673 long tons) standard; 2,340 t (2,303 long tons) full load
- Length: 106.0 m (347.8 ft)
- Beam: 10.5 m (34 ft)
- Depth: 6.4 m (21 ft)
- Propulsion: 2 × Steam turbines (15,000ps); 2 × shafts
- Speed: 30 knots (56 km/h; 35 mph)
- Complement: 240
- Sensors & processing systems: AN/SPS-6 air search radar; OPS-3 surface-search radar; Mk.51 fire-control system; Mk.63 fire-control system; QHBa sonar; (Later AN/SQS-26J); QDA sonar
- Electronic warfare & decoys: OLR-3; (Later OLR-4); Acoustic torpedo
- Armament: 3 × 5-inch/38 caliber Mk.12 guns; 8 × Bofors 40 mm anti-aircraft guns; 2 × Hedgehog anti-submarine mortars; 2 x Mark 2 over-the-side launchers for Mark 32 torpedoes; 8 × K-gun depth charge throwers; 1 × Depth charge rack

The Harukaze-class destroyer was the first indigenous post-World War II Japanese destroyer class. Its main mission was anti-submarine warfare.

== Design ==
Almost all equipment was supplied from the United States according to the U.S. and Japan Mutual Defense Assistance Agreement. Sensor systems on-board was standard equipment in the U.S. Navy at that time, for example, the AN/SPS-6 air-search radar, the AN/SPS-5 surface-search radar, the QHB search sonar, the QDA attack sonar.

Three 5-inch/38 caliber Mark 12 guns were mounted on Mark 30 single mounts, and controlled by a Mark 51 director. The JMSDF wasn't satisfied with performance of the director, so later the Mark 51 was replaced by the Swedish advanced GFCS developed by Contraves (Harukaze) or American Mark 57 (Yukikaze). At the same time, K-guns and depth charge racks were reduced by half and replaced by Mark 32 torpedoes with two Mark 2 over-the-side launchers.

== Ships ==
Pennant no.	Name	Laid down	Launched	Commissioned	Decommissioned
DD-101/ASU-7002	Harukaze	1954	20 September 1955	1956	1985
DD-102/ASU-7003	Yukikaze	1954	20 August 1955	1956	1985
