= AN/SPS-6 =

Two-dimensional radar

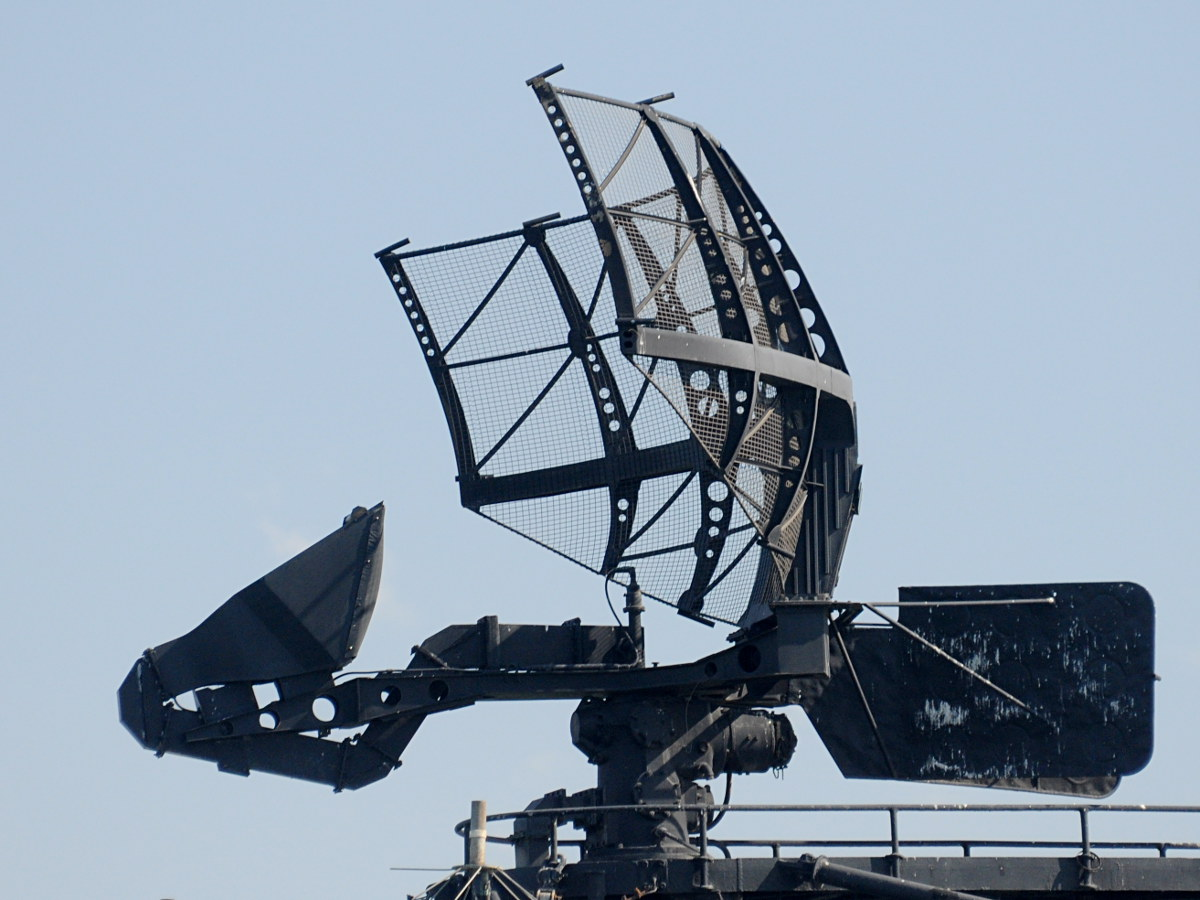
- AN/SPS-6C aboard USS Charrette (DD-581)
- Country of origin: United States
- Manufacturer: Westinghouse Electric; Bendix Corporation
- Introduced: 1948
- Type: 2-dimensional
- Frequency: L Band; 1.25–1.35 GHz (24.0–22.2 cm)
- Range: 70–140 nmi (81–161 mi; 130–260 km)
- Power: 500 kW peak

AN/SPS-6 is a two-dimensional radar manufactured by Bendix and Westinghouse Electric. It was used by the US Navy as a first-generation air-search radar after World War II, and was widely exported to allies. In addition, the improved AN/SPS-12 is the derivative types developed in other countries.

In accordance with the Joint Electronics Type Designation System (JETDS), the "AN/SPS-6" designation represents the 6th design of an Army-Navy electronic device for surface ship search radar system. The JETDS system also now is used to name all Department of Defense electronic systems.

== AN/SPS-6 ==
This machine was developed as a successor to the SR-3 or SR-6 radar, which is an L Band air search radar that has been used in the past. The development is said to have been influenced by AN/TPS-1, which was a portable air radar for the ground. As the antenna, a parabolic antenna that uses a horn antenna as the primary radiation source is adopted. In addition, the modular design allows the configuration to be expanded or contracted according to the ship on which it is mounted. Initially, the following three models existed.

=== AN/SPS-6 ===
The antenna dimensions were 18 ft (5,500 mm) x 5 ft (1,500 mm), the beamwidth was 3 ° x 10 °, and it could be detected at 80 nmi (150 km) for the fighter.

=== AN/SPS-6A ===
The antenna size was similar to -6, but the beamwidth was 3 ° x 20 ° and a fighter could be detected at 70 nmi (130 km).

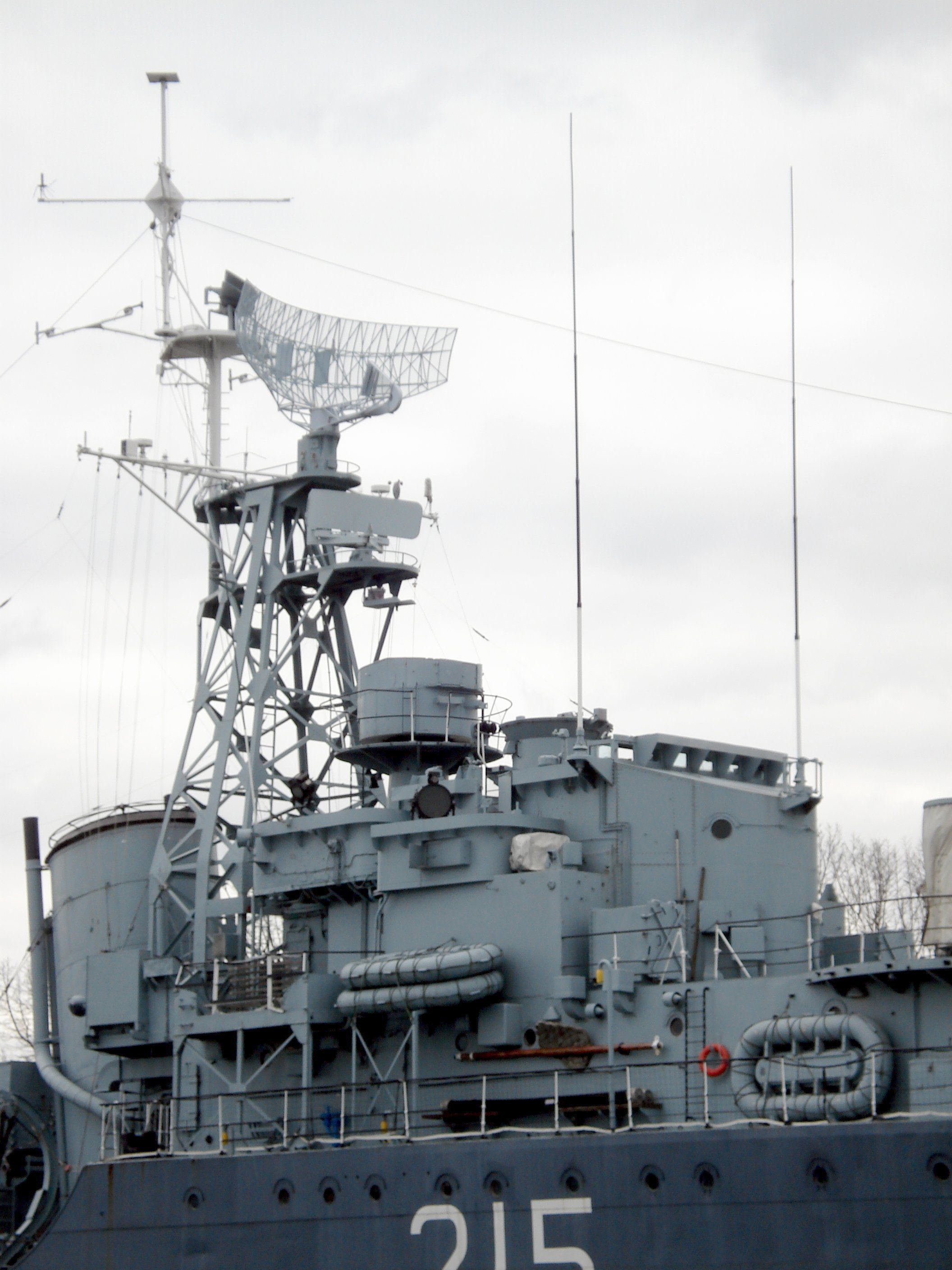
AN/SPS-6 aboard HMCS Haida

=== AN/SPS-6B ===
The beam width is 3 ° x 30 °, 60 nmi (110 km) for fighter aircraft (about one-third for FH-1), and for B-29 at an altitude of 31,000 ft (9,400 m). It was detected at 145 nmi (269 km).

The prototype was handed over to the Navy in 1948, and in September of the same year, USS Macon began testing. In December, it was installed on USS Winslow, USS Zellars, USS Massey and USS Saipan. The mass-produced AN / SPS-6A / B began delivery in sequence from 1950 to 1952, including radar picket ships, Essex-class aircraft carriers with (SCB-27A), and Independence-class aircraft carriers. It was installed in the anti-submarine aircraft carrier with (SCB-54). However, when 25 sets of AN/SPS-6, 45 sets of AN/SPS-6A, and 110 sets of AN/SPS-6B were produced, the production shifted to the improved AN/SPS-6C to AN/SPS-6C-E.

=== AN/SPS-6C ===
More AN/SPS-6C-E were produced. The AN/SPS-6C is similar to the AN/SPS-6B, but with a lighter antenna, 800 lb (360 kg) compared to the conventional 1,000 lb (450 kg). On the other hand, for this reason, the shock resistance is low and the rotation speed is also reduced.

=== AN/SPS-6D ===
The AN/SPS-6D is based on the AN/SPS-6C and omits the IFF, and the final model.

=== AN/SPS-6E ===
The AN/SPS-6E, uses a more improved transmitter.

=== On board ships ===
==== United States Navy ====
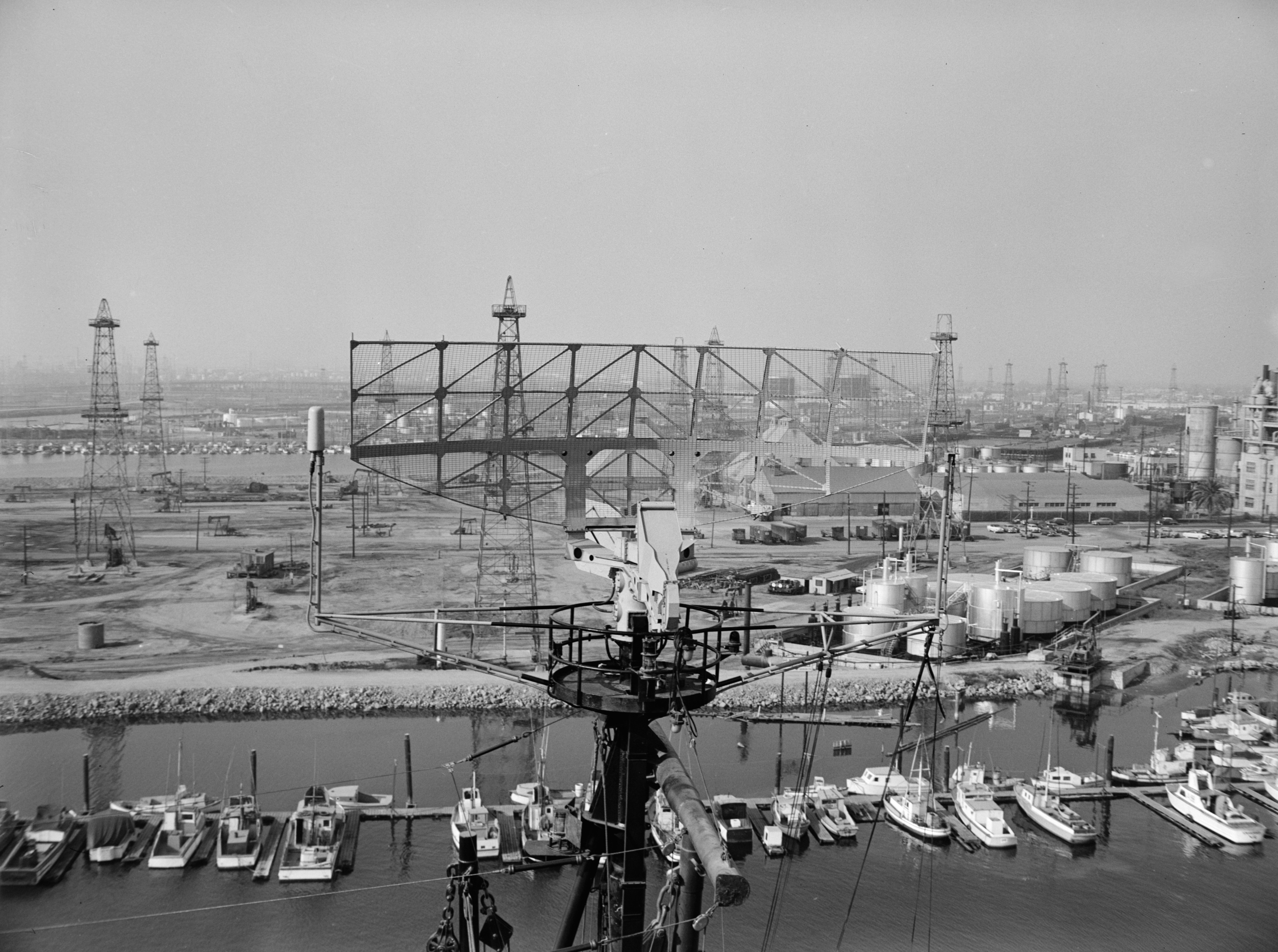
- AN/SPS-6 aboard USS Okanogan
  Essex-class aircraft carrier
- Saipan-class aircraft carrier
- Independence-class aircraft carrier
- Iowa-class battleship
- Worcester-class cruiser
- Des Moines-class cruiser
- Porter-class destroyer
- Fletcher-class destroyer
- Allen M. Sumner-class destroyer
- Gearing-class destroyer
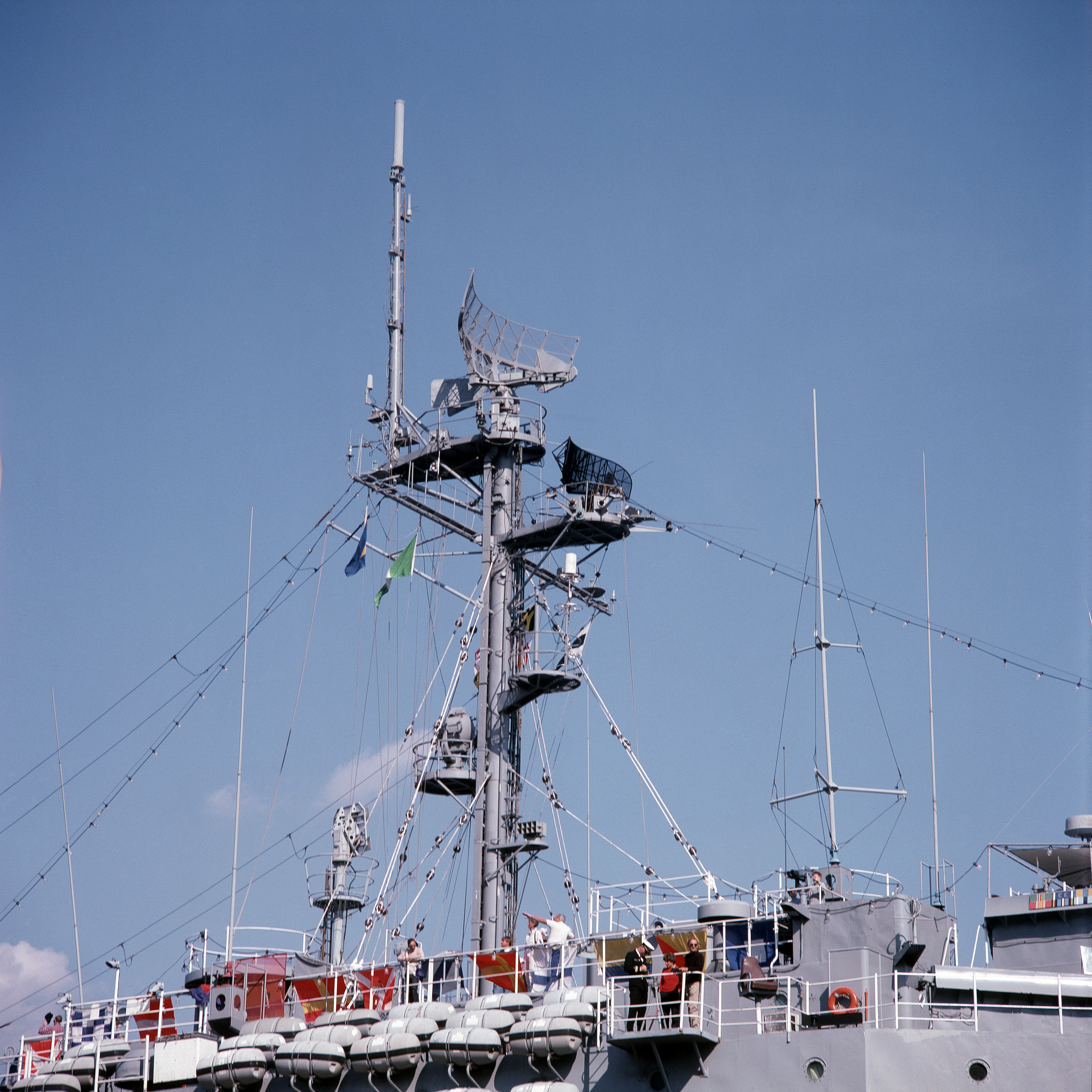
- AN/SPS-6 aboard USS Spiegel Grove
  Mitscher-class destroyer
- Dealey-class destroyer escort
- Claud Jones-class destroyer escort
- USS Triton
- Suribachi-class ammunition ship

==== (Japan) Maritime Self-Defense Force ====
- Harukaze-class destroyer

==== (Italy) Italian Navy ====
- San Giorgio-class destroyer
- Impetuoso-class destroyer
- Centauro-class frigate

==== (Canada) Royal Canadian Navy ====
- Tribal-class destroyer

==== Portugal ====
- Admiral Pereira da Silva-class frigate

== AN/SPS-12 ==
AN/SPS-12 is a completely improved version based on SPS-6C. The antenna measures 17 ft (5.2 m) x 6 ft (1.8 m), weighs 550 lb (250 kg), and has a PRF of 300 to 600 pps. The radar coverage was similar to the AN/SPS-6B. In addition, it could be operated in an environment with a wind speed of up to 70 kn (36 m / s).

The first unit was handed over in September 1953. Later, a new and powerful transmitter (12 MW) could be introduced, which could deliver a detection range of 90 nmi (170 km) and up to 200 nmi (370 km) for jet aircraft. As an improved version, the AN/SPS-12B was developed once, but its introduction was discontinued, and then the AN/SPS-12C, which introduced an RCA parametric amplifier in the transmitter and receiver, was deployed.

The AN/SPS-12 series was produced in 139 sets in the United States and licensed in Italy. It is also a derivative base along with AN/SPS-6.

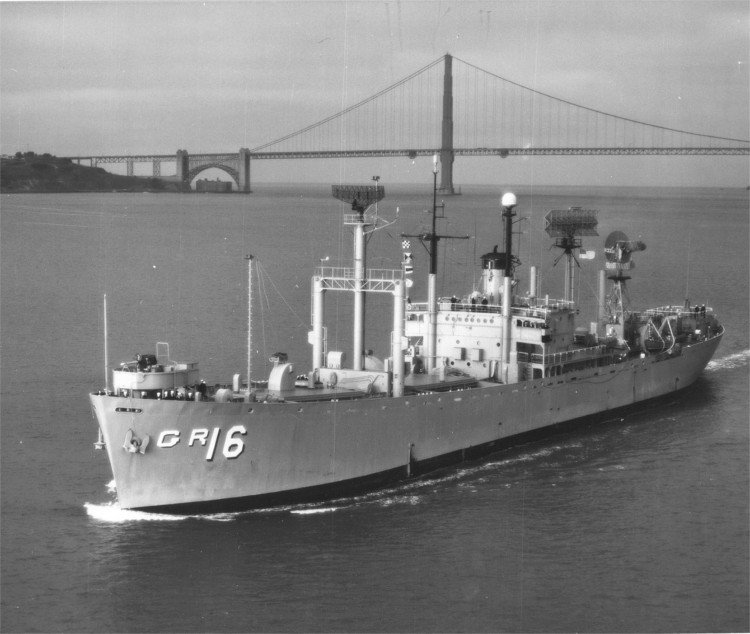
AN/SPS-12 aboard USS Watchman

The successor, AN/SPS-28 (a miniaturized version of AN / SPS-17), began deployment in 1957, but was soon replaced by the better AN/SPS-29. All of these used the same UHF band (B Band) as CXAM during the war.

=== On board ships ===
==== United States Navy ====
- Boston-class cruiser
- Mitscher-class destroyer
- Guardian-class radar picket ship

==== (Italy) Italian Navy ====
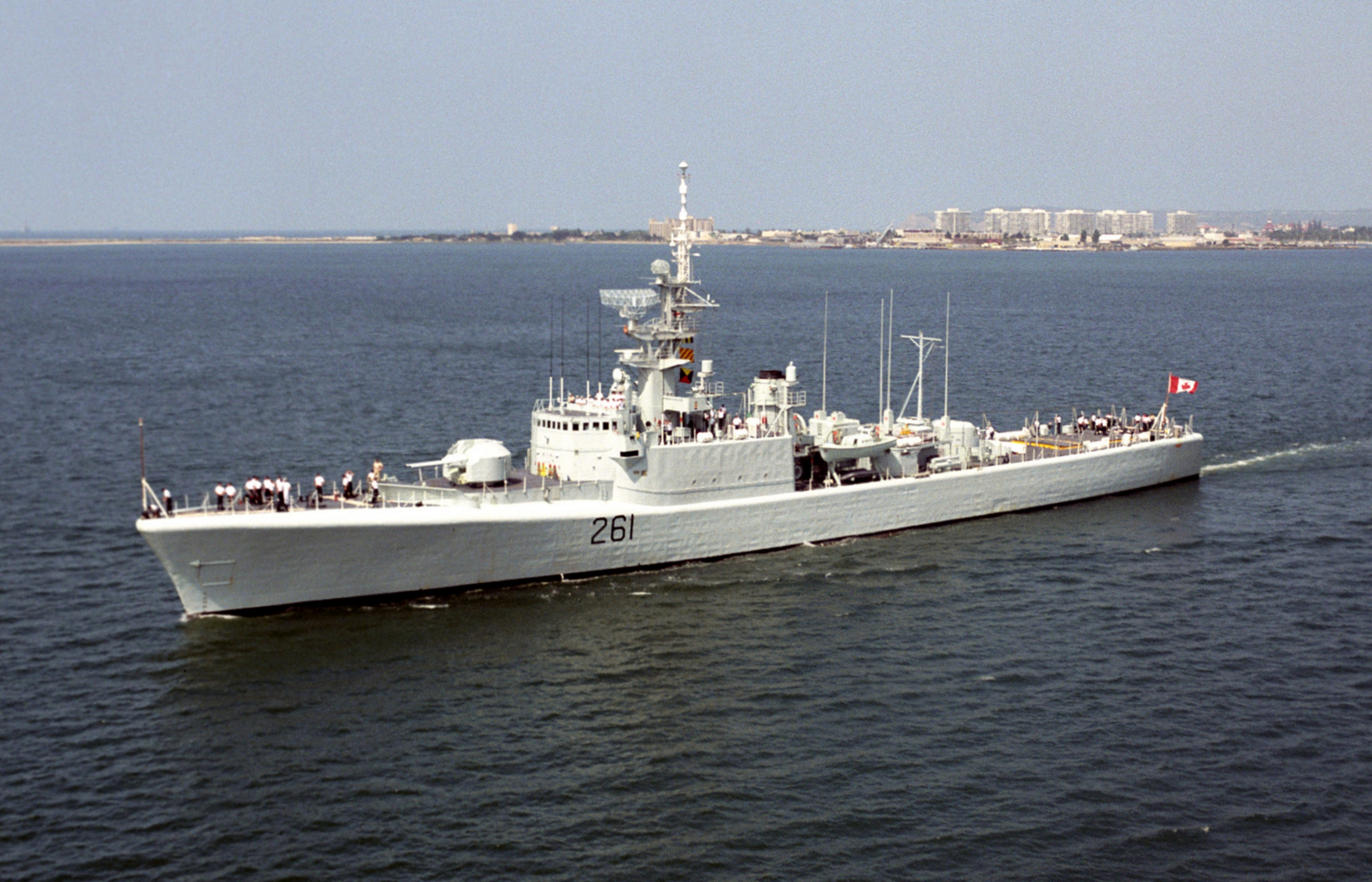
- AN/SPS-12 aboard HMCS Mackenzie
  Andrea Doria-class cruiser
- Impavido-class destroyer
- Alpino-class frigate
- Bergamini-class frigate

==== (Canada) Royal Canadian Navy ====
- HMCS Bonaventure
- St. Laurent-class destroyer
- Restigouche-class destroyer
- Mackenzie-class destroyer
- Annapolis-class destroyer

==== (Japan) Maritime Self-Defense Force ====
- JDS Wakaba
- Ayanami-class destroyer
- Ariake-class destroyer

== OPS-1 / OPS-2 ==
In the early 1950s, the Japan Maritime Self-Defense Force obtained AN/SPS-6 under the Military Assistance Plan (MAP) based on the MSA Agreement for installation on the Harukaze-class destroyer, and domestically produced it based on this. The OPS-1 was developed and installed in the first Akizuki-class destroyer. In addition, the Ayanami-class destroyer was equipped with AN/SPS-12, and this technology was backfitted to the OPS-1. Later, the OPS-2, which had the same transmitter and receiver and a smaller antenna, was also developed for installation on the Isuzu-class destroyer. The maximum detection distance when targeting PV-2 was 50 nautical miles (93 km) for OPS-2.

In the ships built from between 1958 and 1960, the OPS-1 was mounted on destroyers and the OPS-2 was mounted on destroyer escorts. Ships after 1962 and 1966 are now equipped with the B Band OPS-11. However, after that, OPS-14 was developed based on OPS-1 and OPS-2.

=== OPS-1 ===
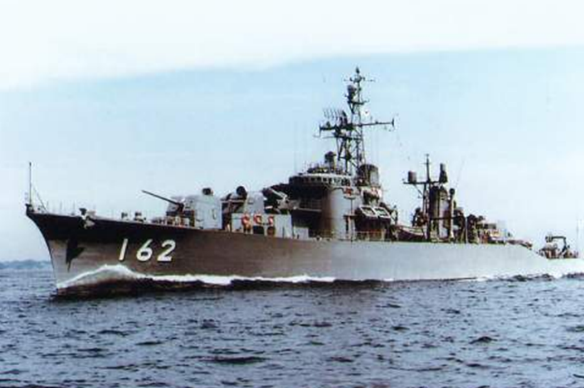
OPS-1 aboard JDS Teruzuki

- Ayanami-class destroyer
- Murasame-class destroyer
- Akizuki-class destroyer

=== OPS-2 ===
- Ikazuchi-class destroyer escort
- Isuzu-class destroyer escort
- Kitakami-class destroyer escort

== SPS-501 ==
It was developed in Canada by combining the AN/SPS-12 transmitter with the LW-03 antenna manufactured by Signar of the Netherlands. In 1967, it was commissioned on board HMCS Bonaventure of the Navy. It was also installed on Iroquois-class destroyers until the TRUMP was refurbished from the late 1980s to the 1990s.

== Gallery ==
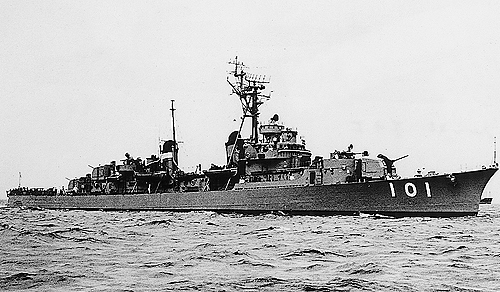
AN/SPS-6 aboard JDS Harukaze

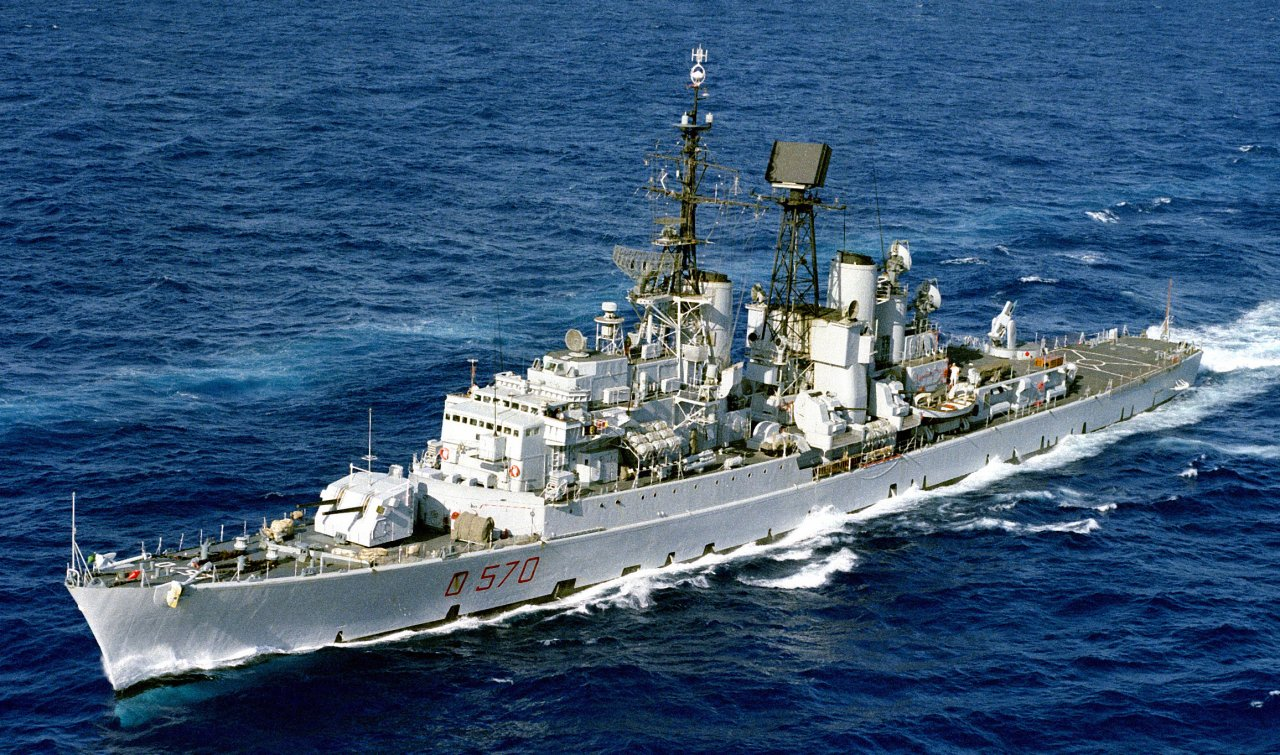
AN/SPS-12 aboard Impavido

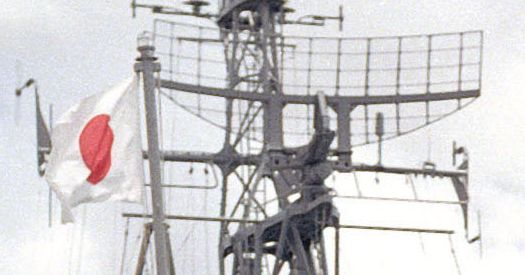
OPS-2 aboard JDS Tokachi

== See also ==
- List of radars
- Radar configurations and types
- Air-search radar
- List of military electronics of the United States

== Bibliography ==
- Norman Friedman (2006). The Naval Institute Guide to World Naval Weapon Systems (5 ed.). Naval Institute Press. ISBN 9781557502629.
- Self-Defense Force Equipment Yearbook 2006-2007. Asaun News Agency. ISBN 4-7509-1027-9
