= List of combatant ship classes of the Japan Maritime Self-Defense Force =

This is a list of combatant ship classes of the Japan Maritime Self-Defense Force.

== CVM : Aircraft-carrying Multi-role Escort Ship ==
- Izumo class (2024-present)

== DDH : Destroyer Helicopter ==
- Haruna class (1973–2011)
- Shirane class (1980–2017)
- Hyūga class (2006-present)
- Izumo class (2015-2024; reclassified to CVM)

== DDG : Guided Missile Destroyer ==
- Amatsukaze (DDG-163) (1965–1995)
- Tachikaze class (1976–2010)
- Hatakaze class (1986-present)
- Kongō class (1993-present)
- Atago class (2007-present)
- Maya class (2020-present)

== DD : Destroyer ==
- Asakaze class - former USN destroyers supplied under Mutual Defense Assistance (1954-1970)
  - Asakaze (DD-181), formerly USS Ellyson (DD-454)
  - Hatakaze (DD-182), formerly USS Macomb (DD-458)
- Ariake class - ex-USN (1959-1974)
  - Ariake (DD-183), formerly USS Heywood L. Edwards (DD-663)
  - Yūgure (DD-184), formerly USS Richard P. Leary (DD-664)
- Harukaze class (1956-1985)
- Akizuki class (1960-1993)
- Hatsuyuki class (1982-2021)
- Asagiri class (1986–present)
- Murasame class (1996-present)
- Takanami class (2003–present)
- Akizuki class (2012-present)
- Asahi class (2018-present)

== DDA : All Purpose Destroyer ==
- Murasame class (1958–1989)
- Takatsuki class (1967–2003)

== DDK : Anti Submarine Destroyer ==
- Ayanami class (1958–1990)
- Yamagumo class (1966–2005)
- Minegumo class (1967–2000)

== DE : Destroyer Escort ==
- Asahi class (1955-1975)
  - Asahi (DE-262), formerly USS Amick (DE-168)
  - Hatsuhi (DE-263), formerly USS Atherton (DE-169)
- Akebono (DE-201) (1956-1976)
- Ikazuchi class (1956-1977)
- Wakaba (DE-261) (1956-1971), former Imperial Japanese Navy ship Nashi
- Isuzu class (1961-1993)
- Chikugo class (1971-2003)
- Ishikari (DE-226) (1981-2007)
- Yubari class (1983-2010)
- Abukuma class (1989-present)

== FFM : Frigate Multi-Purpose/Mine ==
- Mogami class (2022-present)

== PF : Patrol Frigate ==
- Kusu class (Tacoma class) (1951-1976)

== PG : Guided Missile Patrol Boat ==
- PG 1-go class (Sparviero class) (1993-2010)
- Hayabusa class (2002-present)

== SS : Submarine ==
- Kuroshio (SS-501) (1955-1966), formerly USS Mingo (SS-261)
- Oyashio (SS-511) (1960-1976)
- Hayashio class (1962-1979)
- Natsushio class (1963-1980)
- Oshio (SS-561) (1965-1981)
- Asashio class (1966-1986)
- Uzushio class (1971-1996)
- Yūshio class (1980-2008)
- Harushio class (1990-2017)
- Oyashio class (1998-present)
- Sōryū class (2009-present)
- Taigei class (2022-present)

== LST : Tank Landing Ship ==
- Atsumi class (1972-2005)
- Miura class (1975-2002)
- Ōsumi class (1998-present)

== LSU : Landing Ship Utility ==
- Yura class

== LCU : Landing Craft Utility ==
- LCU-2001 class (1988-present)

== LSSL : Patrol Boats ==
- Yuri class

== See also ==
- List of active ships of the Japan Maritime Self-Defense Force

== Bibliography ==
- Scheina, Robert L. & Grove, Eric (1995). "Japan". In Chumbley, Stephen (ed.). Conway's All The World's Fighting Ships 1947–1995. Annapolis, Maryland: Naval Institute Press. pp. 220–243. ISBN 1-55750-132-7.
