= Japanese destroyer Teruzuki =

Three Japanese destroyers have been named Teruzuki:

- Japanese destroyer Teruzuki (1941), an Akizuki-class destroyer launched in 1941 and sunk in 1942
- JDS Teruzuki, an Akizuki-class destroyer launched in 1959 and stricken in 1993
- JS Teruzuki, an Akizuki-class destroyer launched in 2011
