= JDS Akizuki =

Akizuki-class destroyer

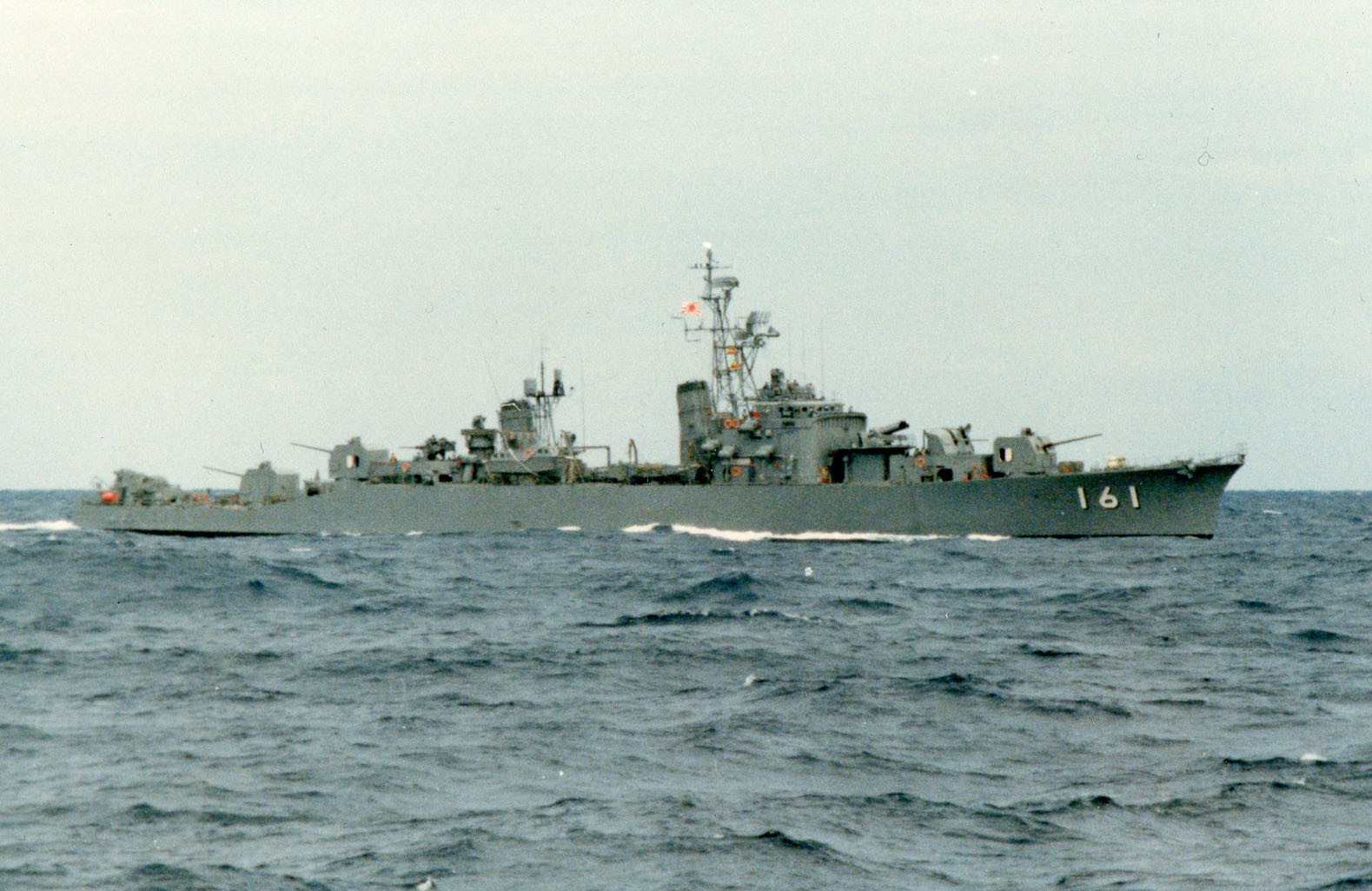
- JDS Akizuki

History

Japan
- Name: Akizuki; (あきづき)
- Namesake: Akizuki (1941)
- Ordered: 1957
- Builder: Mitsubishi Heavy Industries
- Laid down: 31 July 1958
- Launched: 26 June 1959
- Commissioned: 13 February 1960
- Decommissioned: 7 December 1993
- Home port: Yokosuka
- Identification: DD-161, DD-960; ASU-7010
- Fate: Scrapped

General characteristics
- Class & type: Akizuki-class destroyer
- Displacement: 2,350 long tons (2,388 t) standard; 2,890 long tons (2,936 t) normal
- Length: 118 m (387 ft 2 in)
- Beam: 12 m (39 ft 4 in)
- Draft: 4 m (13 ft 1 in)
- Propulsion: 2 steam turbines, 4 boilers 45,000 shp (34,000 kW) / 2 shafts, 2 propellers
- Speed: 32 knots (59 km/h; 37 mph) max.
- Complement: 330
- Sensors & processing systems: Mk.57 fire-control system; Mk.63 fire-control system; OPS-1 air search radar; OPS-5 surface-search radar; AN/SQS-4 sonar; AN/SQR-8 sonar; QQA-1A sonar
- Electronic warfare & decoys: NOLR-1 ESM
- Armament: 3 × 5"/54 caliber Mk.16 guns; 4 × 3"/50 caliber Mk.22 guns (Type 57); 1 × Mk.108 ASW rocket launcher; 2 × Hedgehog ASW mortars; 2 × Mk.2 ASW torpedo racks; 4 × 533 mm (21 in) torpedo tubes; 2 × Y-gun Depth charge throwers; 2 × Depth charge racks

JDS Akizuki (DD-161) was the lead ship of the Akizuki-class destroyer. The vessel was laid down in 1958 and served as a front line warship with the Japan Maritime Self-Defense Force until 1987, and as an auxiliary until 1993.

== Development and design ==
Teruzuki was one of two Akizuki-class destroyers ordered in 1957 by the United States for Japan as part of a military aid package. Although the two destroyers were paid for by the United States, and therefore had hull numbers under the US Navy designation scheme, with Akizuki having the hull number DD-960, they were built in Japanese shipyards to local designs.

The two destroyers were equipped as flotilla leaders, and had the same main gun armament of three American 5-inch (127 mm)/54 caliber guns as used in the previous Murasame class, with four 3-inch (76 mm) anti-aircraft guns in two twin mounts. Anti-submarine armament consisted of a Weapon Alpha anti-submarine rocket launcher, two Hedgehog anti-submarine projectors and two depth charge launchers. A single quadruple mount for 21-inch (533 mm) torpedoes was fitted, with a single set of reload torpedoes.

== Construction and career ==
Akizuki was laid down by Mitsubishi at Kobe in Japan on 31 July 1958, launched on 26 June 1959 and commissioned with the pennant number DD-161 on 13 February 1960. 1957 budget plan ship on the United States side by procurement outside the United States (OSP, procurement of the recipient country) based on the mutual defense assistance agreement between Japan and the United States It was launched on 24 June 1959, and after being put into service as the US Navy-registered ship (DD-960) on 29 February 1960, it was provided to the Maritime Self-Defense Force and incorporated into the Yokosuka District Force.

At the launch ceremony, the wife of Maj. Gen. Wisington, the commander of the U.S. Navy in Japan, cut the rope with an ax, and at the delivery ceremony held the following year, the completion procedure was first carried out to the U.S. Navy, and then After the Stars and Stripes were raised and lowered by US Navy sailors, the Maritime Self-Defense Force boarded the ship and the Self-Defense Ship flag was raised and commissioned as an escort ship.

Incorporated into the Self-Defense Fleet as a ship under direct control on 1 July 1960.

On 26 July 1961, it became the flagship of the 3rd Self-Defense Fleet in place of the escort ship JDS Yukikaze.

On 1 April 1963, the Self-Defense Fleet Command moved to land and the flagship was abolished, so it was transferred to the escort fleet as a ship under direct control. On 3 December, the same year, it became the flagship of the second escort fleet in place of the escort ship JDS Teruzuki.

In March 1968, the depth charge drop rail on the stern and the depth charge projector were removed, and VDS (Variable Depth Sonar) was installed.

In April 1978, the Mk.108 "Weapon Alpha" anti-submarine mortar and Mk.2 short torpedo launcher were removed, and special refurbishment work was carried out to equip the 71-type Bofors rocket launcher and triple short torpedo launcher.

On 27 March 1985, the escort fleet flagship was transferred to the escort ship JDS Murakumo, the type was changed to a special service ship, and the ship registration number was changed to (ASU-7010). Transferred to the Yokosuka District Force as a ship under direct control.

On 24 March 1987, it was transferred to the Development Guidance Group as a ship under direct control.

In 1989, the 3rd turret of the 5-inch gun was removed, and a towed sonar (TASS) was mounted on the rear deck. Since then, he has been engaged in practical tests.

She was decommissioned on 7 December 1993. The total itinerary reached 675,906.69 nautical miles (about 22 weeks on Earth), during which time he participated in five pelagic training voyages as the flagship of the training squadron.
