= Lists of Japanese weapons and military equipment =

Lists of equipment of Japan's modern military include:

- List of equipment of the Japan Ground Self-Defense Force
- List of active Japan Maritime Self-Defense Force ships
  - List of combatant ship classes of the Japan Maritime Self-Defense Force
- List of military aircraft of Japan#Post-1945

Lists of Imperial Japanese military equipment include:

- List of Japanese military equipment of World War II
- List of ships of the Imperial Japanese Navy
  - List of Japanese Navy ships and war vessels in World War II
- List of military aircraft of Japan#Pre-1945

Lists of Japanese weapons and equipment by type include:

- Glossary of Japanese swords
- Firearms of Japan (prose)
- Artillery of Japan (prose)
- Japanese armor#Types (prose)

== See also ==
- Category:Military equipment of Japan
- Category:Weapons of Japan
