= Ariake-class destroyer =

Class of destroyers in the Japan military

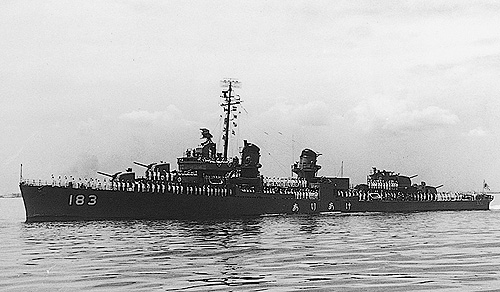
- JDS Ariake in 1960s

Class overview
- Name: Ariake-class destroyer
- Builders: Boston Navy Yard, Massachusetts
- Operators: Coastal Safety Force; Japan Maritime Self-Defense Force
- Preceded by: Asakaze class
- Succeeded by: Harukaze class
- Built: 1943
- In commission: 1959-1974
- Completed: 2
- Retired: 2

General characteristics
- Type: Destroyer
- Displacement: 2,050 long tons (2,083 t)
- Length: 376 ft 6 in (114.76 m)
- Beam: 39 ft 8 in (12.09 m)
- Draft: 13 ft 9 in (4.19 m)
- Propulsion: 60,000 shp (45,000 kW); 2 propellers
- Speed: 35 knots (65 km/h; 40 mph)
- Range: 6,500 nmi (12,000 km; 7,500 mi) at 15 knots (28 km/h; 17 mph)
- Complement: 300
- Sensors & processing systems: SC anti-aircraft search; SG anti-water search; Mk.37 fire-control system; Mk.51 fire-control system; Sonar QCL-8
- Armament: (Early service); 4 × single 5 in (127 mm)/38 guns; 3 × twin 40 mm bofors; 6 × depth charge projectors; 2 × depth charge tracks; (Late service); 3 × single 5 in (127 mm)/38 guns; 1 × RUR-4 Weapon Alpha; 3 × twin 40 mm bofors; 6 × depth charge projectors; 2 × depth charge tracks

The Ariake-class destroyer is a class of destroyers of the Japan Maritime Self-Defense Force. Two ships of the Fletcher class were lent by the United States Navy and were in commission from 1959 until 1974.

== Development ==
JDS Ariake was commissioned as USS Heywood L. Edwards on 26 January 1944, and JDS Yūgure was commissioned as USS Richard P. Leary on 23 February 1944 at the Boston Navy Yard.

After World War II, they were in a mothball state, but on 10 March 1959, they were handed over to Japan at Long Beach in the United States based on the Japan-US Ship Loan Agreement, towed as it was, and moved to Yokosuka Port on 16 April. Both ships held a self-defense ship flag award ceremony on 20 April, and officially became self-defense ships. The mothball dismantling work was carried out at Uraga Dock for Ariake and at Ishikawajima Heavy Industries Tokyo No. 2 Factory for Yūgure. All the launch tubes were removed, a trainee auditorium with a capacity of 40 people was newly established, and a part of the fuel tank was converted into a fresh water tank. This is because this model has the main task of training, and later Ariake participated in the practicing voyage three times and Yūgure four times. At this time, Ariake replaced her sonar with QJA.

After the construction was completed, Yūgure was recommissioned on 17 December 1959. At this point, the Akizuki-class destroyer was under construction, making it the first Maritime Self-Defense Force escort ship to exceed the standard displacement of 2,000 tons. Ariake suffered a breakage accident of the main turbine blade during sea trials, and it was necessary to order parts from the United States, so the recommission was delayed to 21 April 1960.

On 2 March 1970, the 2nd Training Corps was abolished, and Ariake was incorporated into the Practical Experiment Corps (predecessor of the Development Corps). In March of the same year, Ishikawajima Harima Heavy Industries began bow extension work to replace the conventional bow in order to convert it to a low-frequency long-range prototype bow sonar T-101 experimental ship under development at the Technical Research and Development Institute of the Defense Agency. It was cut and replaced with a newly built bow sonar bow, which was 5.5 m (18 ft) longer. As a result, the 5-inch (127 mm) No. 1 gun was removed, sonar-related equipment was stored in the ammunition storage and living quarters on the bow, and diesel generators were installed in the conventional auditorium. These refurbishments increased displacement by 230 tonnes. The construction was completed in March 1971 and the vessel was engaged in practical experiments since then. The T-101, which was repeatedly tested on this ship, was later equipped as the Type 75 detector OQS-101 and is mounted on the Shirane type.

Yūgure moved to the 2nd Mine Warfare Force on 2 March 1970 and to the 1st Mine Warfare Force on 10 March 1972, both of which engaged in support missions as flagships. Both ships were removed from the register on 9 March 1974 due to aging, and were returned to the US Navy at Yokosuka. They were dismantled after being sold in 1976.

== Ships in the class ==
Ariake class
Hull no.	Name	Builder	Laid down	Launched	Commissioned	Decommissioned
DD-183	Ariake	Boston Navy Yard, Massachusetts	4 July 1943	6 October 1943	10 March 1959	9 March 1974
DD-184	Yūgure	Boston Navy Yard, Massachusetts	4 July 1943	6 October 1943	10 March 1959	9 March 1974
