= JS Teruzuki =

Destroyer of the Japan Maritime Self-Defense Force

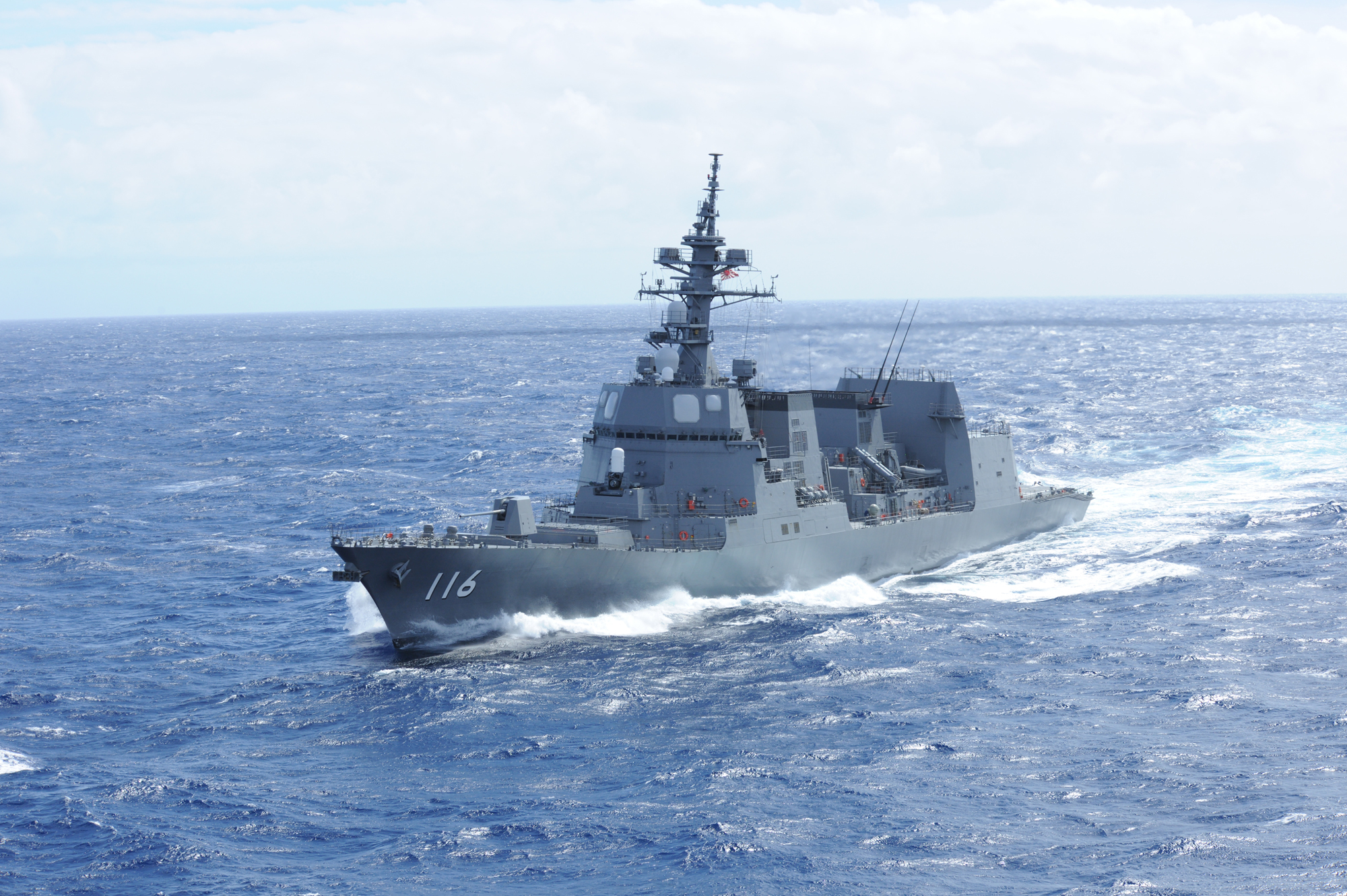
- JS Teruzuki

History

Japan
- Name: Teruzuki; (てるづき)
- Namesake: Teruzuki (1959)
- Ordered: 2008
- Builder: Mitsubishi, Nagasaki
- Laid down: 2 June 2010
- Launched: 15 September 2011
- Christened: 15 September 2011
- Acquired: 28 July 2012
- Commissioned: 7 March 2013
- Home port: Yokosuka
- Identification: DD-116
- Status: Active

General characteristics
- Class & type: Akizuki-class destroyer
- Displacement: 5,000 tonnes standard; 6,800 tonnes full load
- Length: 150.5 m (493 ft 9 in)
- Beam: 18.3 m (60 ft 0 in)
- Draft: 5.3 m (17 ft 5 in)
- Depth: 10.9 m (35 ft 9 in)
- Propulsion: COGAG, two shafts, four Rolls-Royce Spey SM1C turbines
- Speed: 30 knots (56 km/h; 35 mph)
- Complement: 200
- Sensors & processing systems: ATECS (advanced technology command system); OYQ-11 ACDS; FCS-3A AAW system; OQQ-22 ASW system; NOLQ-3D EW system; OPS-20C surface search radar
- Armament: 1 × Mk. 45 Mod 4 127 mm (5 in)/54 gun; 8 × Type 90 Anti-ship missile; 2 × 20 mm Phalanx Block1B CIWS; 2 × HOS-303 triple 324 mm (12.8 in) torpedo tubes; Anti-Torpedo system; 32-cell Mk. 41 Vertical Launching System: RIM-162 ESSM SAM; RUM-139 VL-ASROC (DD 115); Type 07 VL-ASROC (DD 116 to DD 118)
- Aircraft carried: 1 × SH-60K helicopter

JS Teruzuki (DD-116) is the second ship of Akizuki-class destroyers, operated by the Japan Maritime Self-Defense Force. She was commissioned on 7 March 2013.

== Construction ==
Teruzuki was laid down on 2 June 2010 at Mitsubishi Heavy Industries Nagasaki Shipyard & Machinery Works as the 5,000-ton type escort ship No. 2245. Planned for fiscal year 2008 based on the medium-term defense capability development plan, she was launched and named on 15 September 2011. Sea trials started on 28 July 2012. Commissioned on 7 March 2013, it was transferred to the 6th Escort Corps of the 2nd Escort Corps and deployed in Yokosuka.

== Career ==
From 20 September to 14 December 2014, she participated in the TGEX KOA KAI EAST multilateral joint training, conducted in the waters around San Diego, USA.

On 11 March 2017, the 27th Dispatched Anti-piracy Action Water Squadron departed from Yokosuka base for the Gulf of Aden off the coast of Somalia and participated in the Royal Malaysian Navy-sponsored International Fleet Review Ceremony and the Royal Malaysian Navy-sponsored multilateral maritime exercise from 21-26 March and in joint training with the Royal Thai Navy on 18 March, returning to Japan on 1 October.

From 17 to 29 September and 15 to 23 October 2019, Japan-Australia joint training (Japan-Australia Trident) was held in the sea and airspace from the south of Kanto to the west of Kyushu via the area around Okinawa. In addition to this ship from the JMSDF, escort vessels JS Harusame, JS Asahi, JS Atago, and JS Mashu and P-1 patrol aircraft or P-3C patrol aircraft and submarines, and ships and submarines from the Royal Australian Navy participated and conducted various tactical training.

From 14 March to 28 April 2020, she participated in the first year of the Reiwa Practice Voyage (flight). Initially, it the plan was to call at Malaysia (Port Klang) and Brunei (Muara), but the port call was canceled due to the effects of the new coronavirus infection. On 2 April, Japan-US joint training was conducted with the USS Gabrielle Giffords in the Andaman Sea.

From 19 to 23 July 2020, she participated in the Japan-US-Australia joint training conducted in the sea and airspace from the South China Sea and the eastern offshore of the Philippines to the waters around Guam. The Ronald Reagan, Antietam, and Mustin from the US Navy and HMAS Canberra, HMAS Hobart, HMAS Arunta, HMAS Stuart, and HMAS Sirius participated and conducted various tactical training.

== Gallery ==
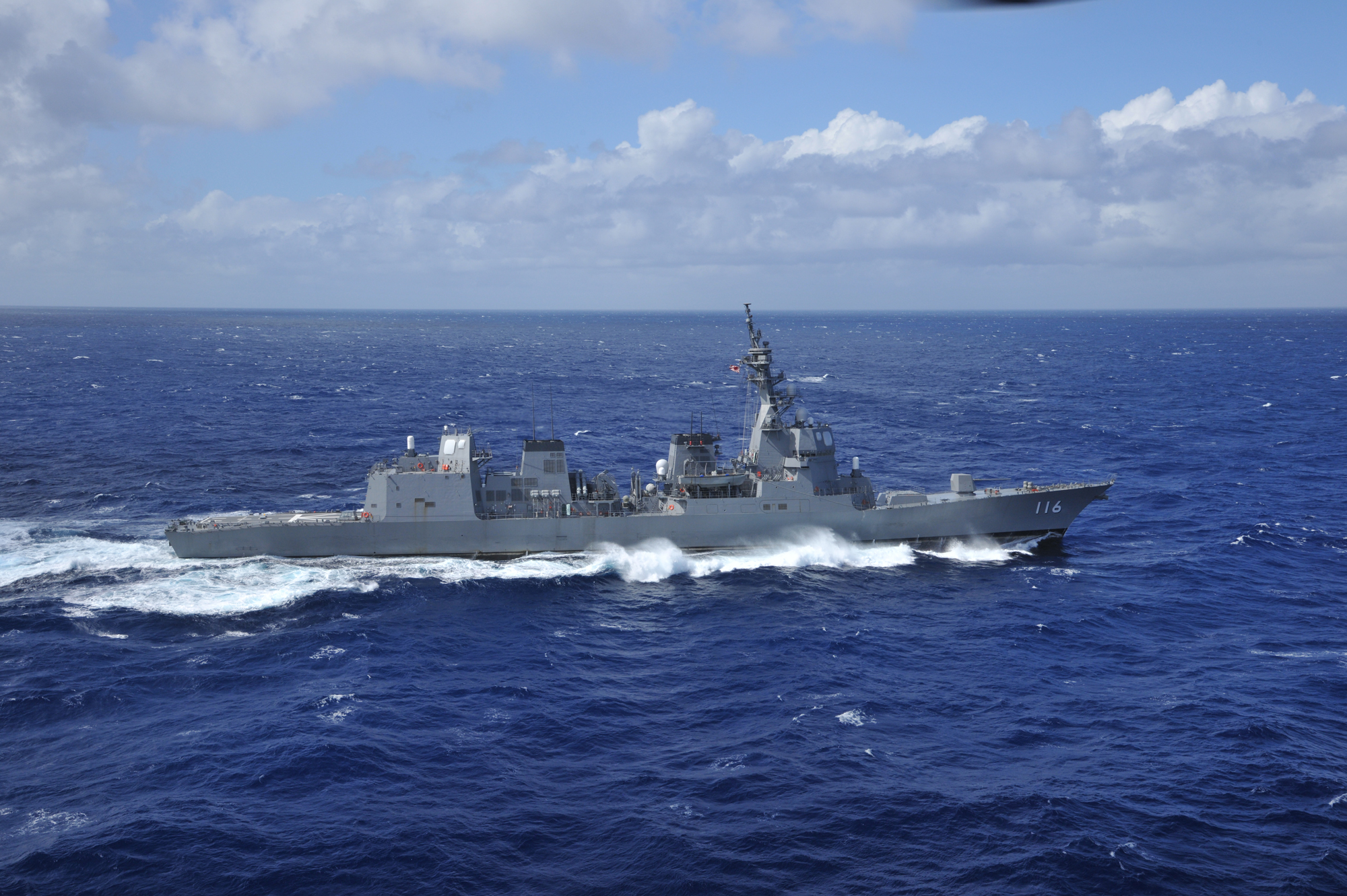
JS Teruzuki underway, date unknown.

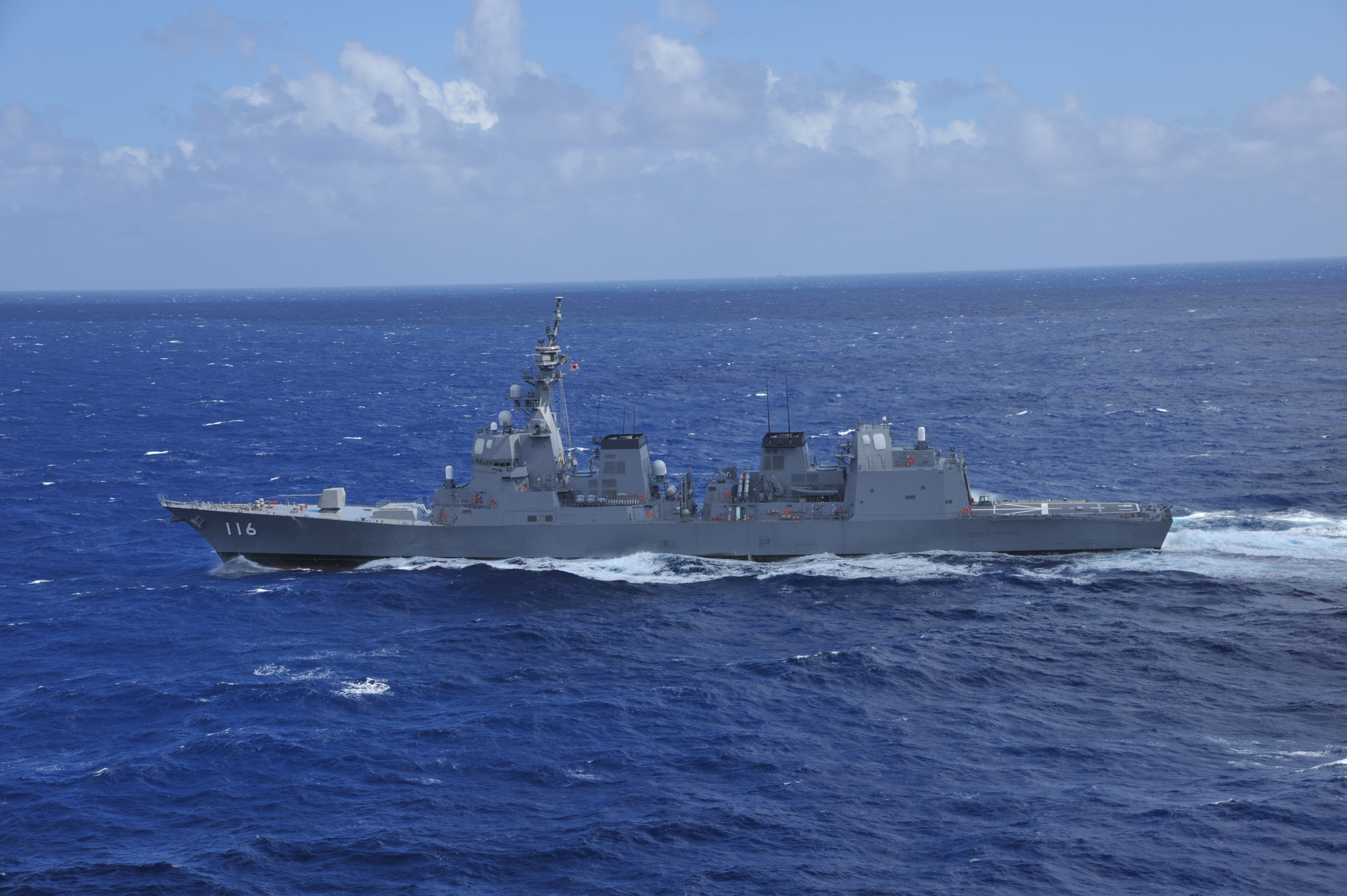
JS Teruzuki underway, date unknown.

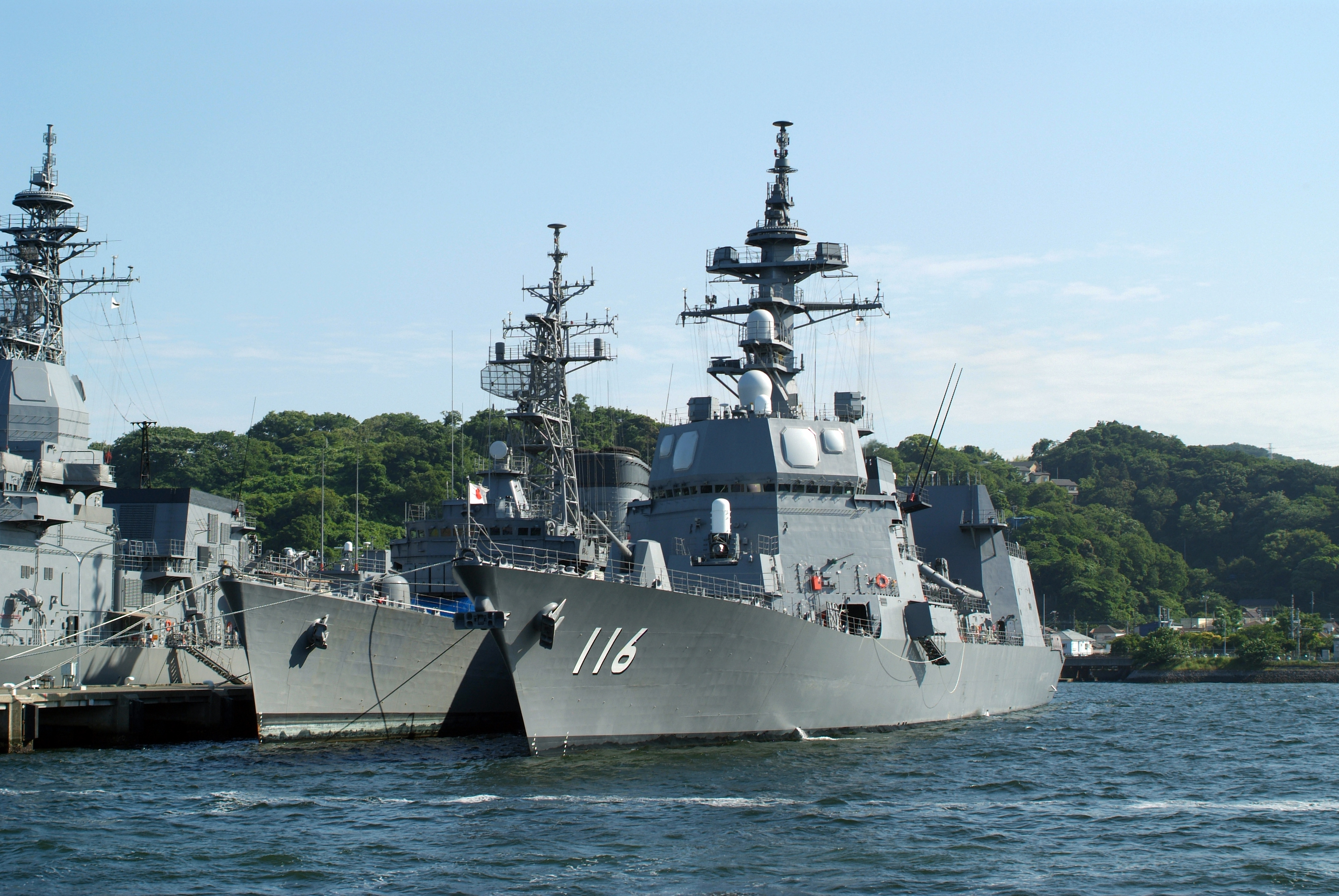
JS Teruzuki, JS Sawayuki, JS Asuka at Yokosuka on 2 June 2013.

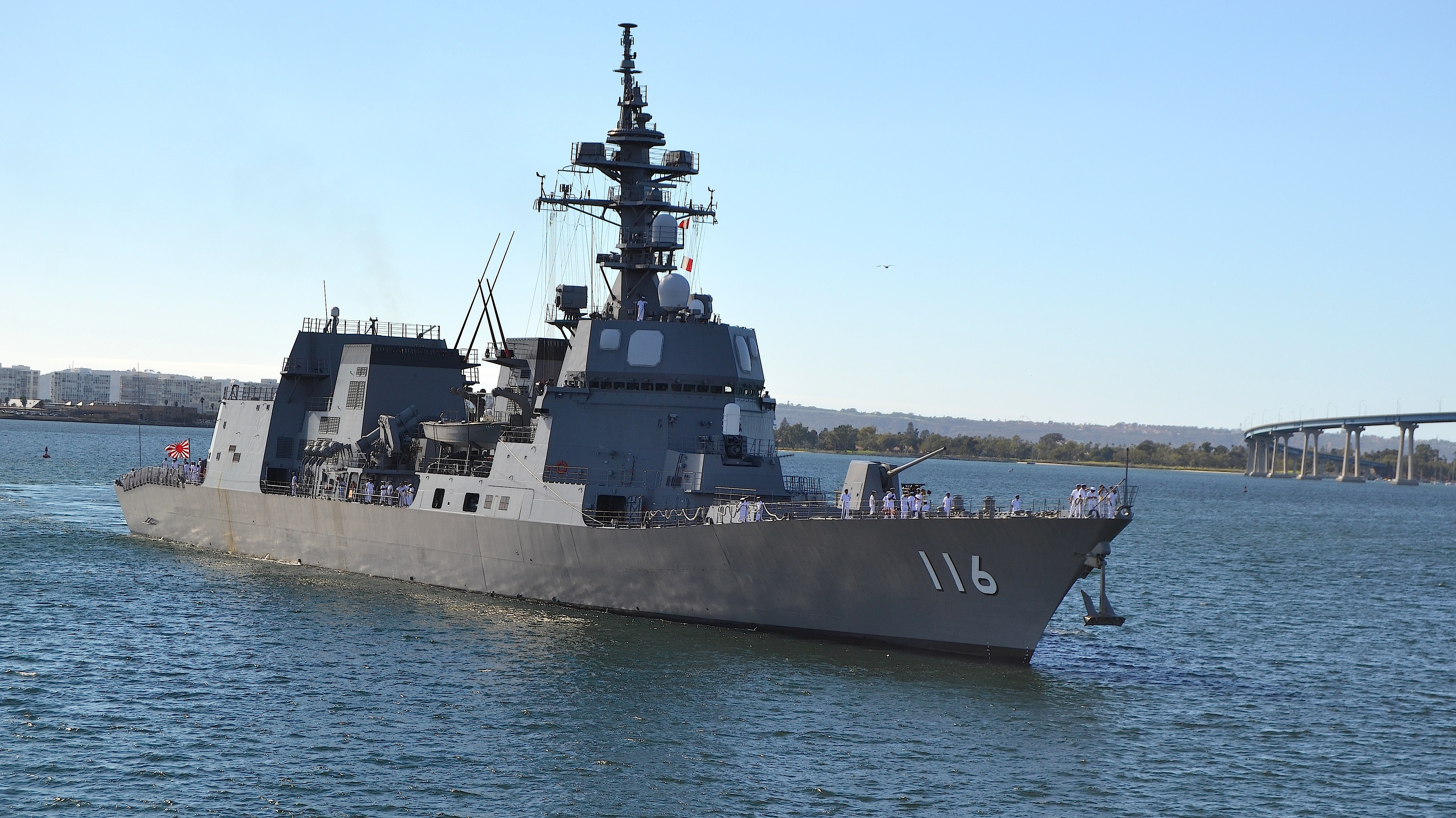
JS Terezuki arrives at Naval Base San Diego, 15 October 2014.

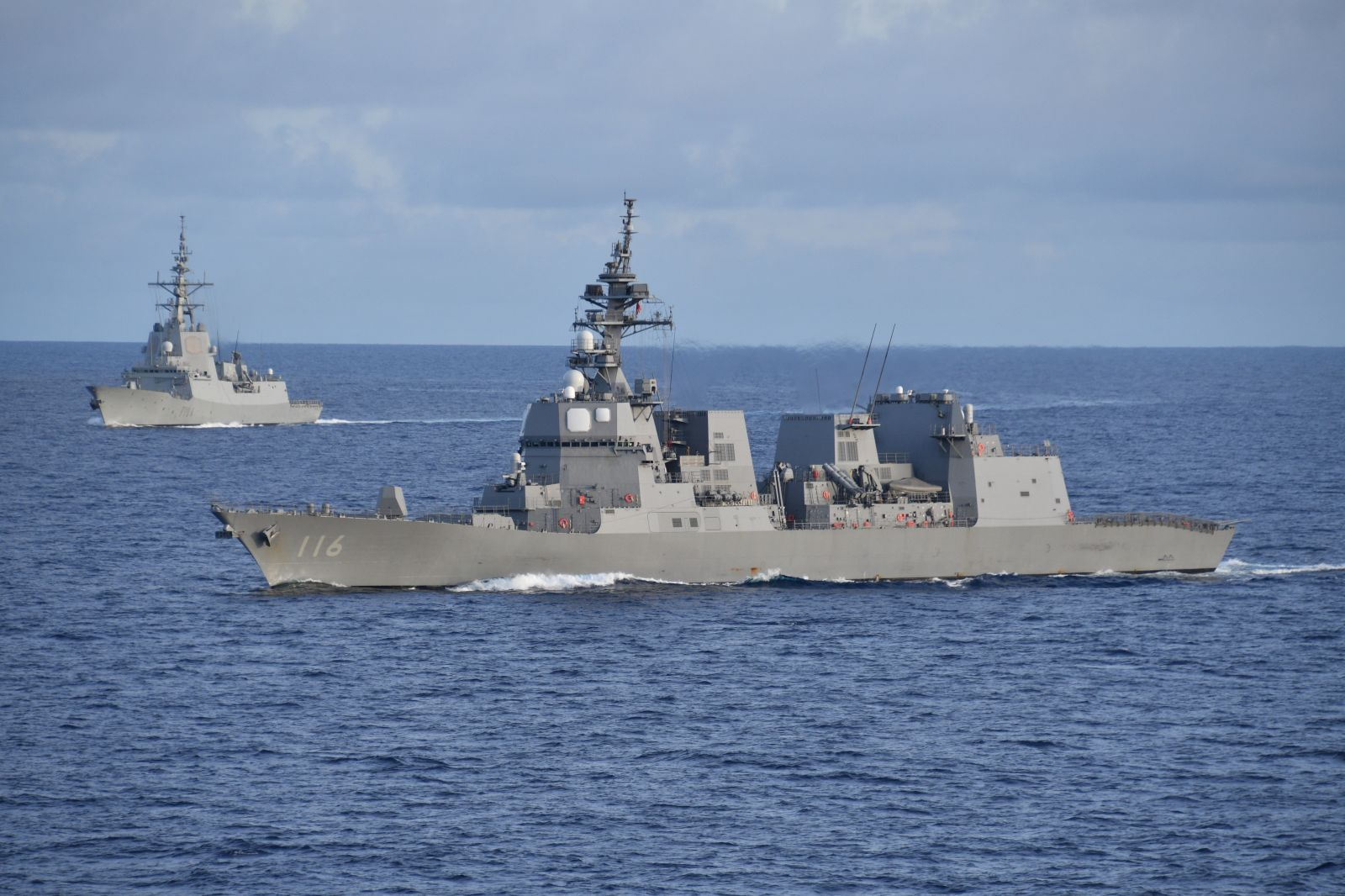
JS Terezuki and Spanish frigate Méndez Núñez, 1 August 2025.

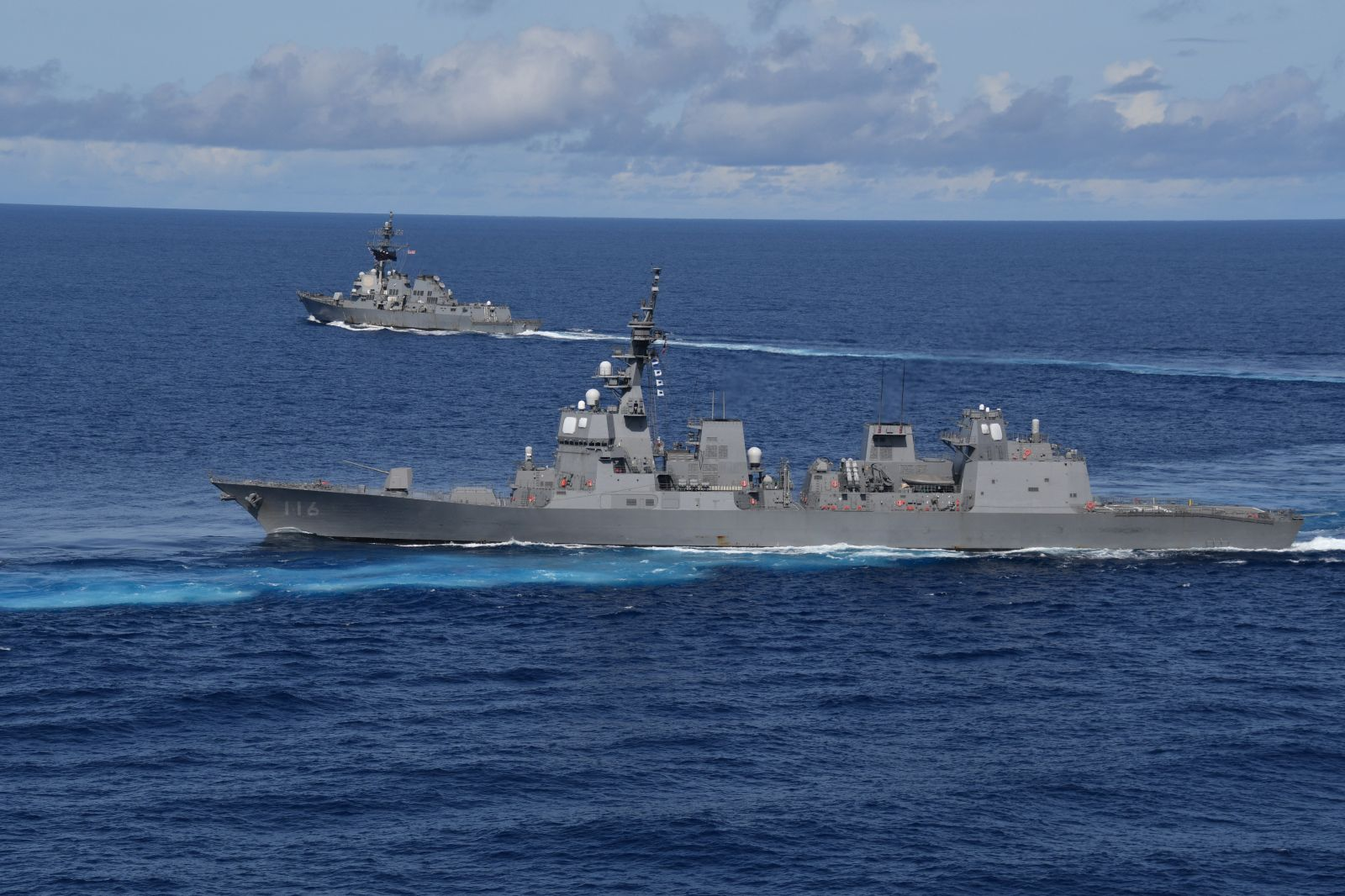
JS Terezuki and USS Shoup, 1 August 2025.
