= USS Richard P. Leary =

Fletcher-class destroyer

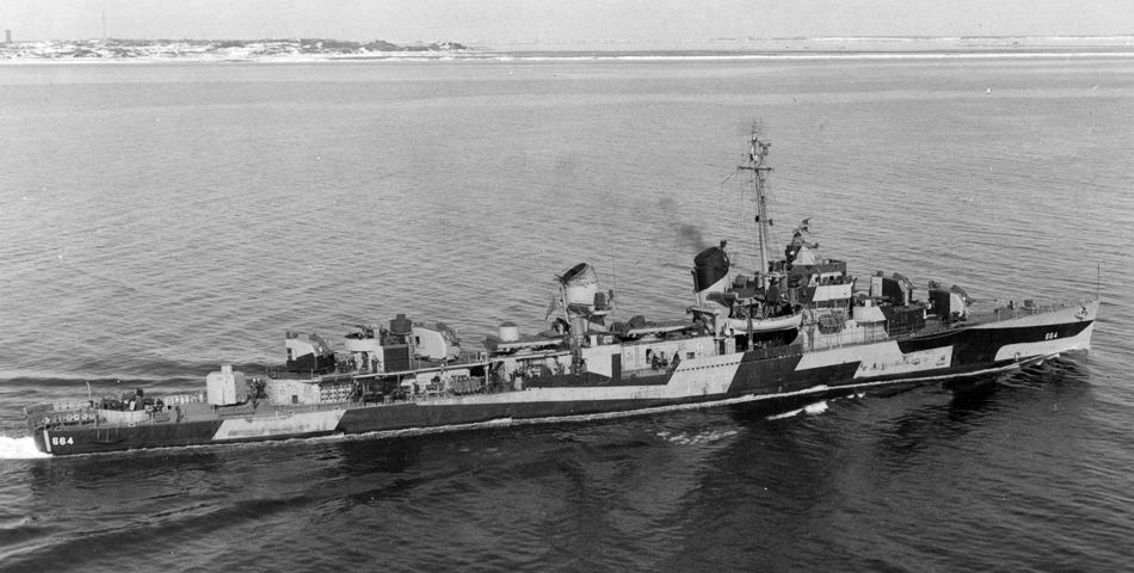
- USS Richard P. Leary underway in April 1944

History

United States
- Name: Richard P. Leary
- Namesake: Richard Phillips Leary
- Builder: Boston Navy Yard
- Laid down: 4 July 1943
- Launched: 6 October 1943
- Commissioned: 23 February 1944
- Decommissioned: 10 December 1946
- Stricken: 18 March 1974
- Identification: Callsign: NWPD; Hull number: DD-664
- Fate: Transferred to Japan, 10 March 1959; Returned 10 March 1974; Scrapped, 1 July 1976

Japan
- Name: Yūgure; (ゆうぐれ)
- Namesake: Yūgure (1934)
- Sponsored by: Mrs. George K. Crozer III
- Acquired: 10 March 1959
- Commissioned: 1960
- Decommissioned: 9 March 1974
- Stricken: 18 March 1974
- Identification: Hull number: DD-184
- Fate: Returned to US, 10 March 1974

General characteristics
- Class & type: Fletcher-class destroyer; Ariake-class destroyer
- Displacement: 2,050 long tons (2,083 t)
- Length: 376 ft 5 in (114.73 m)
- Beam: 39 ft 7 in (12.07 m)
- Draft: 13 ft 9 in (4.19 m)
- Propulsion: 60,000 shp (45 MW); 2 propellers
- Speed: 35 knots (40 mph; 65 km/h)
- Range: 6,500 nmi (12,000 km) at 15 kn (17 mph; 28 km/h)
- Complement: 329
- Armament: 5 × 5 in (127 mm)/38 guns; 10 × 40 mm AA guns; 7 × 20 mm AA guns; 10 × 21 inch (533 mm) torpedo tubes; 6 × depth charge projectors; 2 × depth charge tracks

Service record
- Part of: United States Pacific Fleet (1943–1946); Pacific Reserve Fleet (1946–1959,1974); Japan Maritime Self-Defense Force (1959–1974)
- Operations: Battle of Peleliu (1944); Battle of Leyte (1944); Battle of Surigao Strait (1944); Battle of Luzon (1945); Battle of Iwo Jima (1945); Battle of Okinawa (1945)
- Awards: 6 battle stars

USS Richard P. Leary (DD-664) was a Fletcher-class destroyer of the United States Navy. In 1959, the ship was transferred to the Japanese Maritime Self-Defense Force and renamed Yūgure. The destroyer remained in service with the Japanese until 1974, when she was returned to the US, who then sold the ship for scrap in 1976.

== Namesake ==
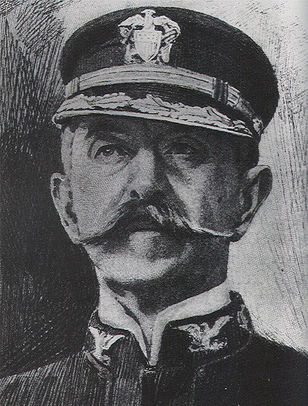
Late 1800s illustration of Leary

Richard Phillips Leary was born on November 3, 1842, in Baltimore, Maryland, to Cornelius Leary. He entered the United States Naval Academy in 1860. During the American Civil War, he served on the screw sloop USS Canandaigua and the monitor USS Sangamon assigned to the Atlantic blockade.

During tension with Germany over Samoa, Leary commanded USS Adams at Samoa from October to December 1888. In the Spanish–American War, he commanded the USS San Francisco off Havana, Cuba. From 1899 into 1900, Captain Leary served as Naval Governor of Guam. Retiring in 1901, Rear Admiral Leary died on 27 December at Chelsea, Massachusetts.

== Construction and career ==
Richard P. Leary was laid down on 4 July 1943 at the Boston Navy Yard, Boston, Massachusetts; launched 6 October 1943, sponsored by Mrs. George K. Crozer III; and commissioned 23 February 1944.

=== Service in the United States Navy ===
Following shakedown off Bermuda, Richard P. Leary sailed via the Panama Canal for Pearl Harbor. After escort duty to Eniwetok and Saipan in July, she supported the landings at Peleliu 15 September 1944, and at Leyte 20 October. During the Battle of Surigao Strait on 25 October, she launched torpedoes at the Japanese battleship Yamashiro, splashed one enemy plane, and guarded the damaged destroyer USS Albert W. Grant. While patrolling off Leyte Gulf on 1 November, she rescued 70 survivors of the destroyer USS Abner Read.

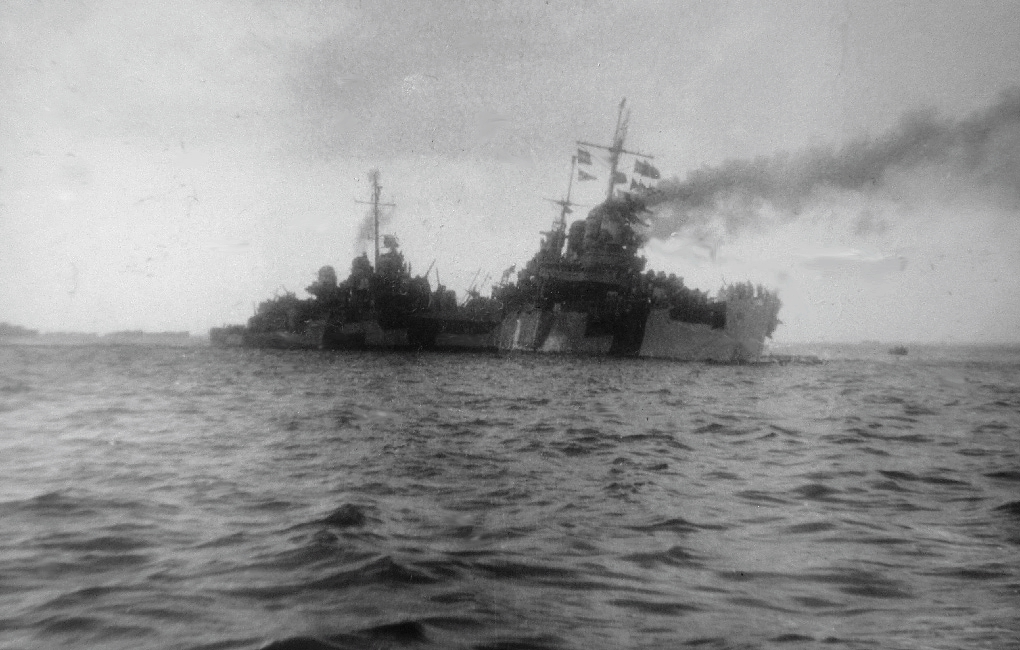
Richard P. Leary alongside the torpedoed Honolulu off Leyte on 20 October 1944

During the Lingayen Gulf campaign, Richard P. Leary on 6 January, during a suicide attack, she severely damaged an incoming Nakajima J1N "Irving" fighter, which managed to graze the forward 5-inch gun mounts before crashing—the only damage of the war. Later that day, she also shot down a Nakajima B6N "Jill" and rendered fire-support for the landings on 9 January.

The Leary again supplied gunfire support for the landings at Iwo Jima 19 February, and was assigned to Task Force 54 (TF 54) for the invasion of Okinawa, supplying gunfire support for the assault landings on 1 April. During the night of 6–7 April she escorted the damaged destroyer USS Morris to Kerama Retto, Okinawa Gunto.

Upon completion of duties at Okinawa her next assignment took her to Adak, Alaska, in August. After serving in the Aleutians, Leary sailed for Japan arriving at Ominato, 8 September. She departed Japan on 30 September, and steamed to San Diego, California.

Designated for inactivation after her return, Richard P. Leary decommissioned 10 December 1946, and was assigned to the Pacific Reserve Fleet.

=== Service in the Japanese Maritime Self-Defense Force ===
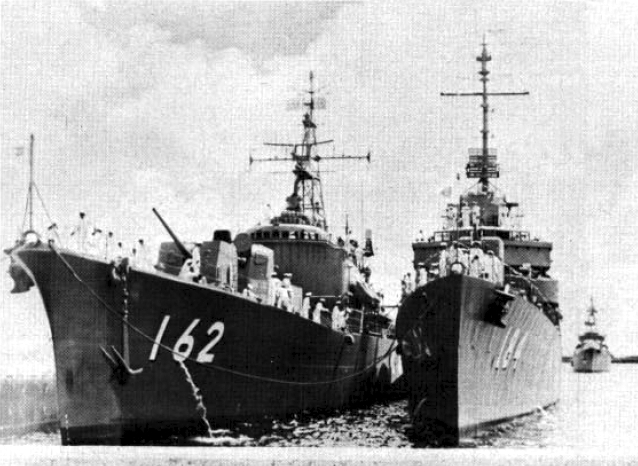
Japanese destroyers Teruzuki and Yūgure at Guam, 1962.

Richard P. Leary, along with her sister ship, USS Heywood L. Edwards (DD-663), was transferred 10 March 1959 to Japan, where she served in the Japan Maritime Self-Defense Force as JDS Yūgure (DD-184) ("Autumn Twilight").

The ship was returned to U.S. custody on 10 March 1974, stricken from the U.S. Naval Vessel Register on 18 March, and sold for scrap on 1 July 1976.

Richard P. Leary received six battle stars for World War II service.
