= Asakaze-class destroyer =

Class of destroyers in the Japan military

Asakaze class
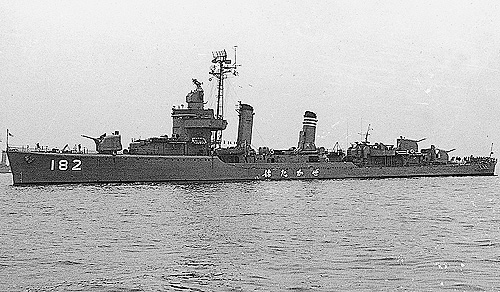
- JDS Hatakaze in 1960s

Class overview
- Name: Asakaze-class destroyer
- Builders: Bath Iron Works, Maine; Federal Shipbuilding and Drydock Company, New Jersey
- Operators: Coastal Safety Force; Japan Maritime Self-Defense Force
- Preceded by: N/A
- Succeeded by: Ariake class
- Subclasses: Gleaves class
- Built: 1940
- In commission: 1954–1969
- Completed: 2
- Retired: 2

General characteristics
- Type: Destroyer
- Displacement: 1,630 tons standard, 2,395 tons full load
- Length: 348 ft 3 in (106.15 m)
- Beam: 36 ft 1 in (11.00 m)
- Draft: 13 ft 2 in (4.01 m)
- Installed power: 4 Babcock & Wilcox boilers, 2 Westinghouse geared steam turbines; 50,000 shp (37,000 kW)
- Propulsion: 2 shafts
- Speed: 37.4 knots (69.3 km/h; 43.0 mph)
- Range: 6,500 nmi (12,000 km; 7,500 mi) at 12 knots (22 km/h; 14 mph)
- Complement: 16 officers, 260 enlisted
- Armament: (Early service); 4 × 5 in (127 mm) DP guns; 2 × 40 mm Bofors guns; 2 × 20 mm Oerlikon guns; 5 × 21 in (533 mm) torpedo tubes; 4 × K-gun depth charge throwers; 6 × Depth charge tracks; (Late service); 3 × 5 in (127 mm) DP guns; 2 × 40 mm Bofors guns; 2 × 20 mm Oerlikon guns; 5 × 21 in (533 mm) torpedo tubes (1 × 5); 4 × K-gun depth charge throwers; 6 × Depth charge tracks

The Asakaze-class destroyer is a class of destroyers of the Japan Maritime Self-Defense Force. Two ships of the Gleaves class were lent by the United States Navy and were in commission from 1954 until 1969.

== Development ==
JDS Asakaze was commissioned as USS Ellyson on 28 November 1941 at Federal Shipbuilding and Drydock Company, and JDS Hatakaze was commissioned as USS Macomb on 26 January 1942 at the Bath Iron Works.

In 1951, General Matthew Ridgway, Supreme Commander of the Allied Forces, proposed to lend a patrol frigate (PF) and a landing support boat (LSSL) to Japan under Allied occupation. In response to this, on 26 April 1952, the Coastal Safety Force was established within the Japan Coast Guard to serve as a receiver for these warships and as the base of a future navy. Then, with the establishment of the National Safety Agency on 1 August, the same year, the Coast Guard was reorganized into a security force by absorbing the route enlightenment department of the Japan Coast Guard, and together with the National Police Reserve (later the National Safety Force), which is a land unit, it became a subordinate and was set up for a full-scale reorganization system.

Of the rented vessels, all 18 of the PFs were delivered during 1953 and commissioned as Kusu-class frigates, which later became the starting point for the development of the Maritime Self-Defense Force escort vessels. In the budget for 1952, which is the year when the guards were established, the construction of support vessels (water vessels, heavy oil vessels, etc.) to improve the operational base of these guard vessels was prioritized, and the construction of combat ships was not carried out. Although domestic construction of security vessels began in 1953, the construction in the same year was two 1,600-ton instep security vessels (DD; Harukaze class) and 1,000-ton B-type security vessels (Akebono and Ikazuchi class) It was fastened to 3 ships.

== Ships in the class ==
Asakaze class
Hull no.	Name	Builder	Laid down	Launched	Commissioned	Decommissioned
DD-181	Asakaze	Federal Shipbuilding and Drydock Company, New Jersey	20 December 1940	26 July 1941	19 October 1954	15 October 1969
DD-182	Hatakaze	Bath Iron Works, Maine	3 September 1940	23 September 1941	19 October 1954	15 October 1969

== Gallery ==
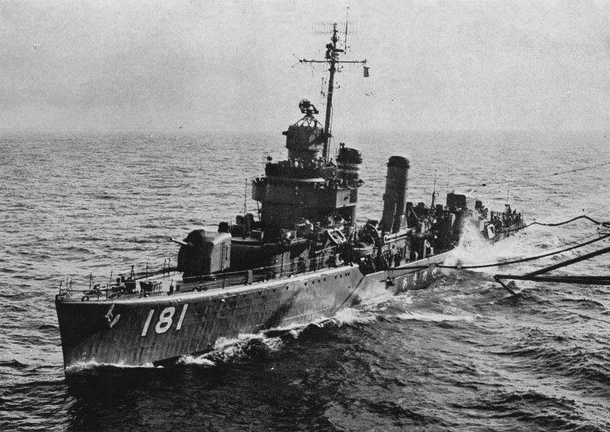
JDS Asakaze underway in 1959.
