= LCU-2001-class landing craft =

Watercraft in the Japan military

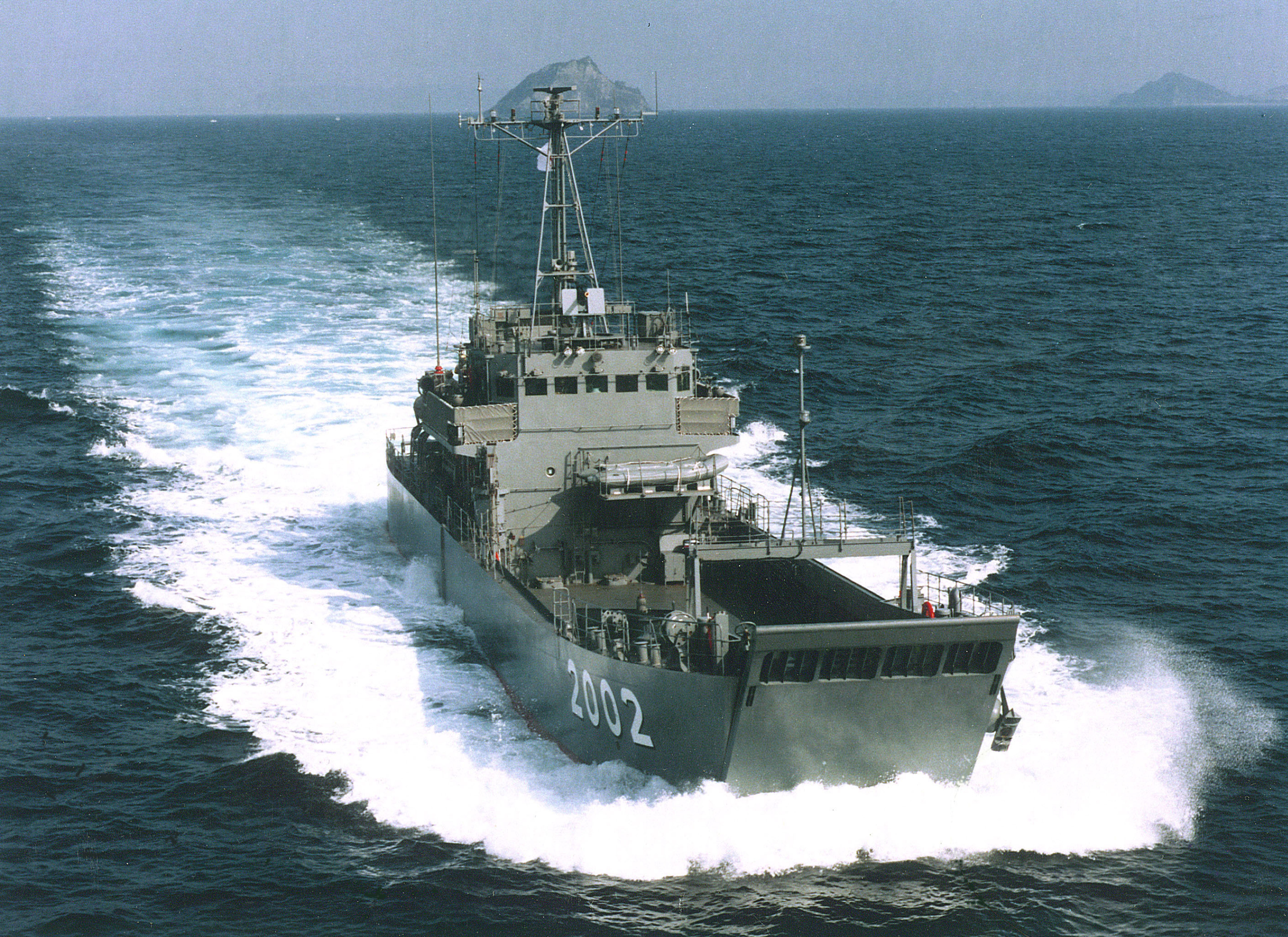
- JS LC-02 underway on 5 June 2013

Class overview
- Name: LCU-2001 class
- Builders: Sasebo Heavy Industries, Sasebo
- Operators: Japan Maritime Self-Defense Force
- Preceded by: Yura class
- Built: 1987–1991
- In commission: 1988–present
- Completed: 2
- Active: 1
- Retired: 1

General characteristics
- Type: Landing craft utility
- Displacement: 420 tons standard, 540 tons hull load
- Length: 52 m (170 ft 7 in)
- Beam: 8.7 m (28 ft 7 in)
- Draft: 1.6 m (5 ft 3 in)
- Depth: 3.9 m (12 ft 10 in)
- Propulsion: 2 × Mitsubishi S6U-MTK diesel engines, 3,000 shp (2.2 MW); 2 shafts, cp props
- Speed: 12 knots (22 km/h; 14 mph)
- Complement: 28
- Sensors & processing systems: OPS-9
- Armament: 1 × JM61-M 20 mm gun

The LCU-2001-class landing craft is a class of utility landing craft (LCU) of the Japan Maritime Self-Defense Force. Two craft were constructed in the 1980s.

== Description ==
The vessel are an LCU type transport boat for transporting personnel and supplies to remote coastal areas and remote islands. The Maritime Self-Defense Force had the Yura class for use as a small transport ship, but this type is simplified and miniaturized based on it.

It is said that this model can carry up to 200 people and 25 tons of supplies. The bottom of the ship is flat for beaching, and there is an anchor at the stern for use in reefing. The front part of the ship is an open loading space where vehicles and supplies are loaded. In addition, 70 troops can be installed. It is almost the same size as the United States Army's Runnymede-class landing craft, but the displacement is different, and while the Runnymede class can carry three tanks, this model does not support the mounting of tanks due to weight. It is said that this is due to the emphasis on long-distance transportation capacity of personnel.

The method of landing supplies is to sit on the shore and lower the bow ramp on the bow. In the Yura class, there were two stages, a bow door and a ramp, but in this type, there is only one bow ramp, and the bow shape is also flat. At the rear of the ship is a bridge, as well as a troop residence and engine department. As an armament, it is equipped with one JM61 20 mm cannon, which is a human-powered gun, at the top of the bridge.

== Ships in the class ==
LCU-2001 class
Hull no.	Name	Builder	Laid down	Launched	Commissioned	Decommissioned	Status
LCU-2001	LC-01	Sasebo Heavy Industries, Sasebo	11 May 1987	9 October 1987	17 March 1988	7 April 2022	Decommissioned
LCU-2002	LC-02	Sasebo Heavy Industries, Sasebo	15 May 1991	7 October 1991	11 March 1992		Active

== Gallery ==
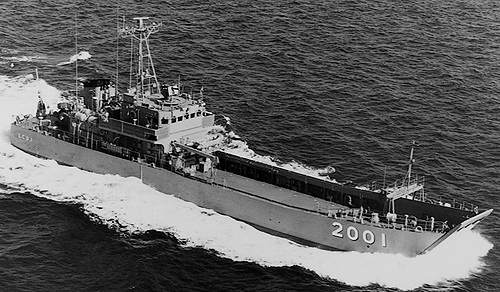
JS LC-01 underway, date unknown.

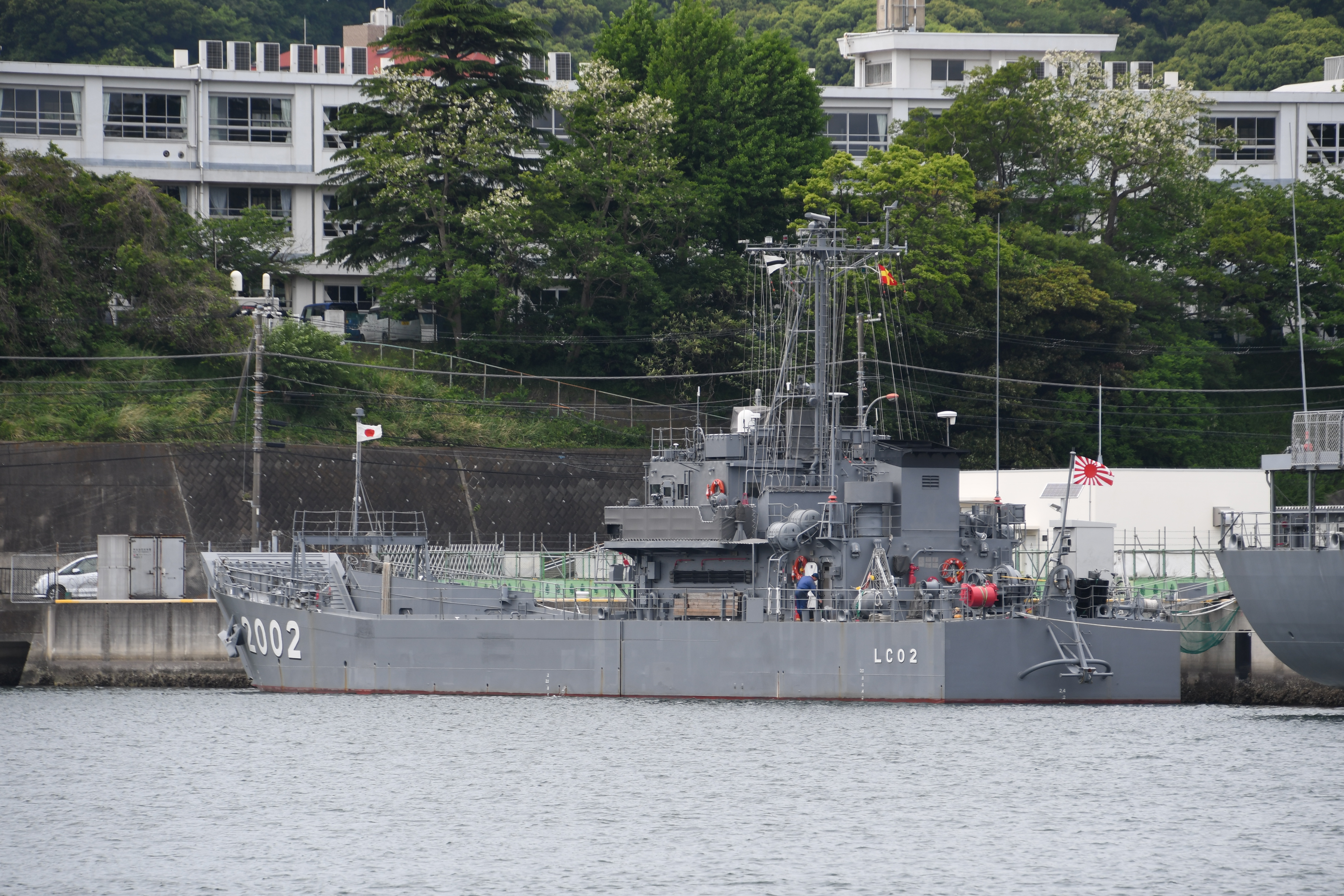
JS LC-02 at Yokosuka on 30 April 2018.
