= USS Heywood L. Edwards =

Fletcher-class destroyer

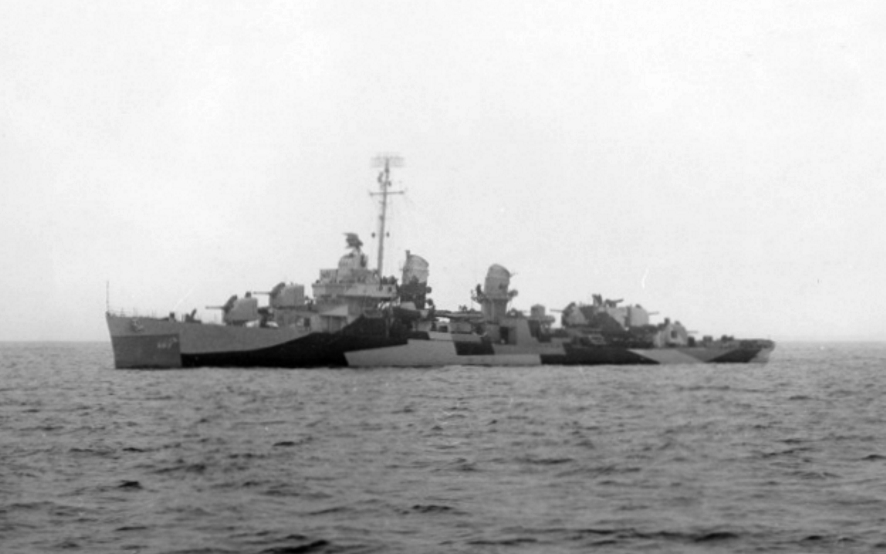
- USS Heywood L. Edwards off Boston on 5 April 1944

History

United States
- Name: Heywood L. Edwards
- Namesake: Heywood L. Edwards
- Builder: Boston Navy Yard
- Laid down: 4 July 1943
- Launched: 6 October 1943
- Sponsored by: Mrs. Louise S. Edwards
- Commissioned: 26 January 1944
- Decommissioned: 1 July 1946
- Stricken: 18 March 1974
- Identification: Callsign: NUVG; Hull number: DD-663
- Honours and awards: See Awards
- Fate: Transferred to Japan, 10 March 1959

Japan
- Name: Ariake; (ありあけ)
- Namesake: Ariake (1934)
- Acquired: 10 March 1959
- Commissioned: 10 March 1959
- Decommissioned: 1974
- Stricken: 1974
- Identification: Hull number: DD-183
- Fate: Scrapped, 1976

General characteristics
- Class & type: Fletcher-class destroyer; Ariake-class destroyer
- Displacement: 2,050 long tons (2,083 t)
- Length: 376 ft 6 in (114.76 m)
- Beam: 39 ft 8 in (12.09 m)
- Draft: 13 ft 9 in (4.19 m)
- Propulsion: 60,000 shp (45 MW); 2 propellers
- Speed: 35 knots (65 km/h; 40 mph)
- Range: 6,500 nmi (12,000 km) at 15 kn (17 mph; 28 km/h)
- Complement: 319
- Armament: 5 × 5 in (127 mm)/38 caliber guns; 4 × 40 mm AA guns; 4 × 20 mm AA guns; 10 × 21 inch (533 mm) torpedo tubes; 6 × depth charge projectors; 2 × depth charge tracks

Service record
- Part of: United States Pacific Fleet (1944-1946); Pacific Reserve Fleet (1946-1959); Japan Maritime Self-Defense Force (1959-1974)
- Operations: Battle of Saipan (1944); Battle of Tinian (1944); Battle of Peleliu (1944); Philippines campaign, 1944-45; Battle of Surigao Strait (1944); Battle of Luzon (1945); Battle of Iwo Jima (1945); Battle of Okinawa (1945)
- Awards: 7 battle stars; Navy Unit Commendation

USS Heywood L. Edwards (DD-663) was a Fletcher-class destroyer of the United States Navy, named after Lieutenant Commander Heywood L. Edwards (1905–1941), captain of the destroyer USS Reuben James, the first U.S. Navy ship sunk in World War II. Following the war, the ship was transferred to Japan and renamed Ariake. The ship served with the Japanese until 1974 and was scrapped in 1976.

== Construction and career ==
Heywood L. Edwards was launched by Boston Navy Yard on 6 October 1943, sponsored by Mrs Louise S. Edwards, mother of Lt. Comdr. Edwards. The ship was commissioned on 26 January 1944.

=== Service in the United States Navy ===
==== Marianas and Palaus ====
Heywood L. Edwards conducted her shakedown beginning 25 February off Bermuda and after gunnery exercises off the Maine coast departed to join the Pacific Fleet. Sailing from Boston, Massachusetts on 16 April, she transited the Panama Canal, stopped at San Diego, California and arrived at Pearl Harbor on 8 May. There Edwards, took part in training manoeuvres with Task Force 52 (TF 52) under Vice Admiral Richmond K. Turner. The ships got underway from Pearl Harbor on 29 May for the Marianas with Heywood L. Edwards acting as screening unit for the transport group and during the initial landings on Saipan on 15 June the destroyer took up patrol station to seaward of the invasion beaches. From 21–30 June she approached the beaches to deliver fire support for the advancing Marines and continued that duty until 2 July. Edwards then joined the cruiser USS Montpelier for the bombardment of Tinian, as part of the Marianas campaign.

The destroyer returned to her gunfire support role off Saipan on 6 July and the next night, 7 July, she was called upon to rescue a group of soldiers cut off from Allied lines and stranded on the beach. Heywood L. Edwards put over her whaleboat and made four shuttle trips over the reefs to rescue 44 men, transferring them to a nearby LCI. Between 19 and 21 July she shelled Tinian in support of the impending landing there, returned to Saipan for fire support duties and got underway from the Marianas on 30 July for Eniwetok.

Heywood L. Edwards took part in the Peleliu operation, departing 18 August for training exercises with amphibious forces on Florida Island and sailing for the western Carolines 6 September. Arriving 11 September, the destroyer maintained an antisubmarine patrol around the heavier units until 13 September, when she was detached to provide close support for underwater demolition teams (UDTs) clearing beach obstructions. On 15 September, Edwards provided illumination fire at night and knocked out an ammunition dump. She encountered a group of barges with reinforcements shortly after midnight 23 September and after illuminating them with star shell engaged with her main guns. By dawn, she claimed 14 of the barges, aided by landing craft and helped prevent the landing of Japanese troops.

==== Philippines ====
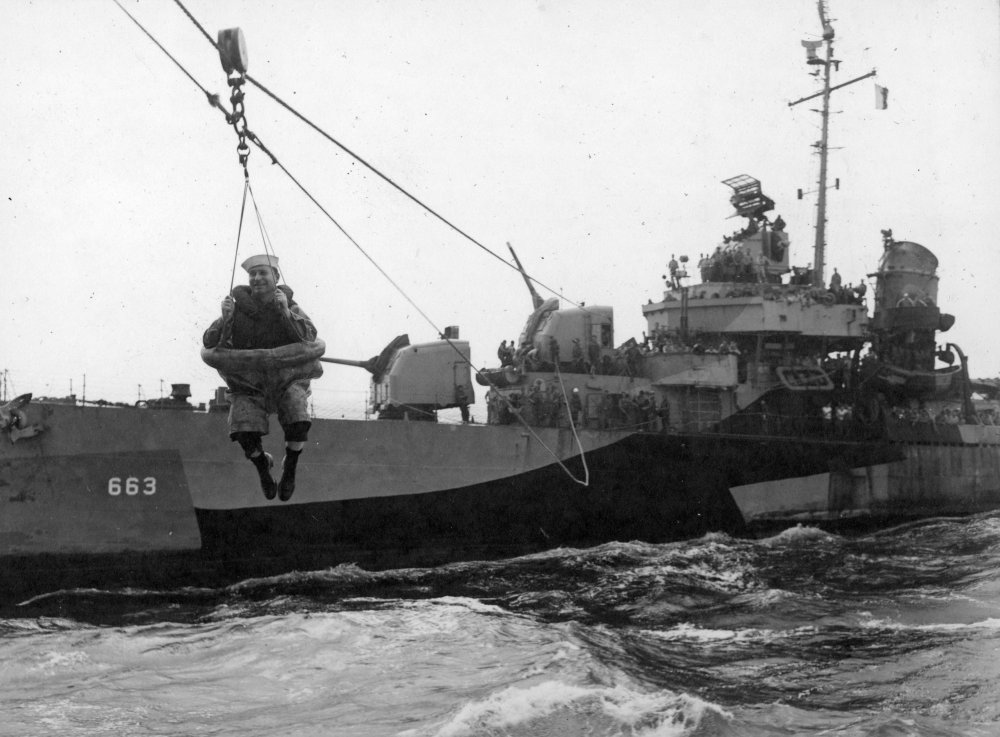
Heywood L. Edwards transfers a sailor to another ship, in 1944-1945

Heywood L. Edwards proceeded to Manus Island, Admiralty Islands arriving 1 October. There she joined with Rear Admiral Jesse B. Oldendorf's fire support and bombardment group for the return to the Philippines, departing for Leyte 12 October 1944. She conducted pre-invasion bombardment 18–20 October and provided gunfire support for the landings on 20 October. This work continued for 4 days and under frequent air attack. Edwards joined once more with Rear Admiral Oldendorf's force for the Battle of Surigao Strait.

As Oldendorf's deployed forces waited at the end of Surigao Strait, Heywood L. Edwards headed section 3 of Destroyer Squadron 56 (DesRon 56), screening the left flank of the cruiser line. Torpedo boats and destroyers made the initial attacks, farther down the strait and just after 03:00 25 October Edwards and her unit was ordered to attack. In company with Leutze and Bennion, the destroyers steamed down the port side of the enemy column and launched torpedoes. Two hits were obtained on Japanese battleship Yamashiro with the destroyer Albert W. Grant damaged. After this attack, the Japanese steamed into Oldendorf's main forces. As the destroyers retired, the heavy units shelled the enemy ships, with only the cruiser Mogami (later sunk by aircraft) and destroyer Shigure escaping. The following morning, Heywood L. Edwards took station on the port bow of the cruisers in search of any remaining enemy vessels, patrolled the eastern entrance to the strait for a day, then returned to take up station in Leyte Gulf.

With the Allied victory complete at sea, Heywood L. Edwards remained in the invasion area until 25 November, patrolling and protecting the shipping building up in the gulf. She arrived at Manus for a rest and repair period on 29 November, sailing on 15 December for training exercises in the Palau Islands. She departed on 1 January with Oldendorf's group for the second phase of the Philippine invasion, at Lingayen Gulf. Engaging kamikaze suicide aircraft as they sailed, the ships arrived Lingayen Gulf 6 January where Edwards claimed two of these aircraft. She then took up her fire support duties for UDT teams and with the landings, 9 January covered troops on the beachhead and fired at shore targets. She continued these assignments and convoy escort until 22 January, when she departed for Ulithi.

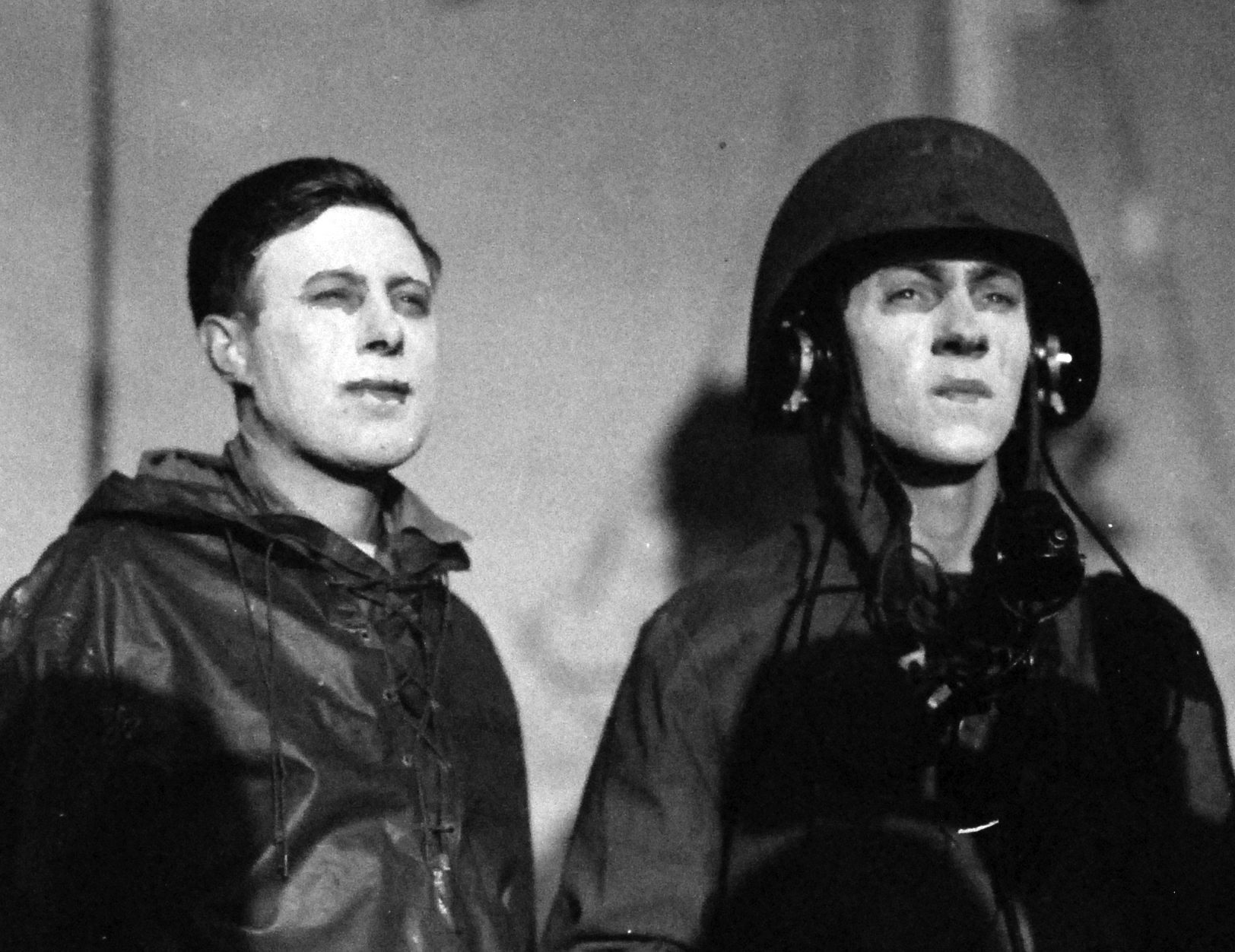
Men onboard Heywood L. Edwards in February 1945

==== Iwo Jima and Okinawa ====
Iwo Jima was seen as a key base for B-29 operations against the mainland of Japan. Heywood L. Edwards participated in landing rehearsals 12–14 February 1945 and screened the fleet during the pre-invasion bombardment. During the landings on Iwo Jima she provided naval gunfire support from the 19–27 February, when she sailed for Saipan.

Heywood L. Edwards returned to Ulithi and joined Task Force 54 (TF 54) for the invasion of Okinawa. TF 54 departed Ulithi on 21 March and after her arrival 4 days later Heywood L. Edwards covered the UDT teams' reconnaissance of Kerama Retto. On 27 March, in preparation for the main landings, she helped defend the fleet from kamikaze attacks. She covered the UDT landings on Okinawa on 30 March, shelled an airfield ashore that afternoon and on 1 April joined in the bombardment of the assault areas. During the next weeks of fighting ashore, naval forces effectively sealed off the island from any reinforcement and supported the troops with gunfire. Edwards and the other vessels fought off air attacks. When destroyer Longshaw ran aground on a reef 18 May, Heywood L. Edwards knocked out shore batteries which had fired on the ship. She then continued performing fire support and radar picket duties off Okinawa until 28 July, when she sailed for Leyte Gulf.

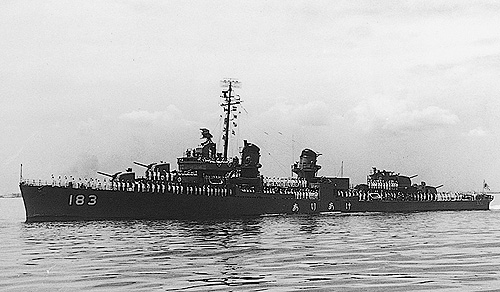
Ariake in the 1960s

The destroyer departed Leyte on 2 August and after a time at Saipan and Eniwetok she got underway again on 29 August. Sailing toward Japan, Heywood L. Edwards covered the initial occupation of the Ominato area on 6 September 1945 and departed that port on 22 October for the United States, via Pearl Harbor. She arrived at Seattle on 10 November, decommissioned on 1 July 1946 and entered the Long Beach Group, Pacific Reserve Fleet.

=== Service in the Japanese Maritime Self-Defense Force ===
Heywood L. Edwards was brought out of reserve in 1959 and along with her sister ship Richard P. Leary was loaned to Japan under the Military Assistance Program. She served in the Japan Maritime Self-Defense Force as JDS Ariake (DD-183) until 1974.

Ariake was broken up for scrap in 1976.

== Awards ==
Heywood L. Edwards received seven battle stars for her service in World War II and a Navy Unit Commendation for her outstanding part in the great amphibious operations of 1944–45.
