= Akizuki-class destroyer (1959) =

Destroyer class of the Japan Maritime Self-Defense Force

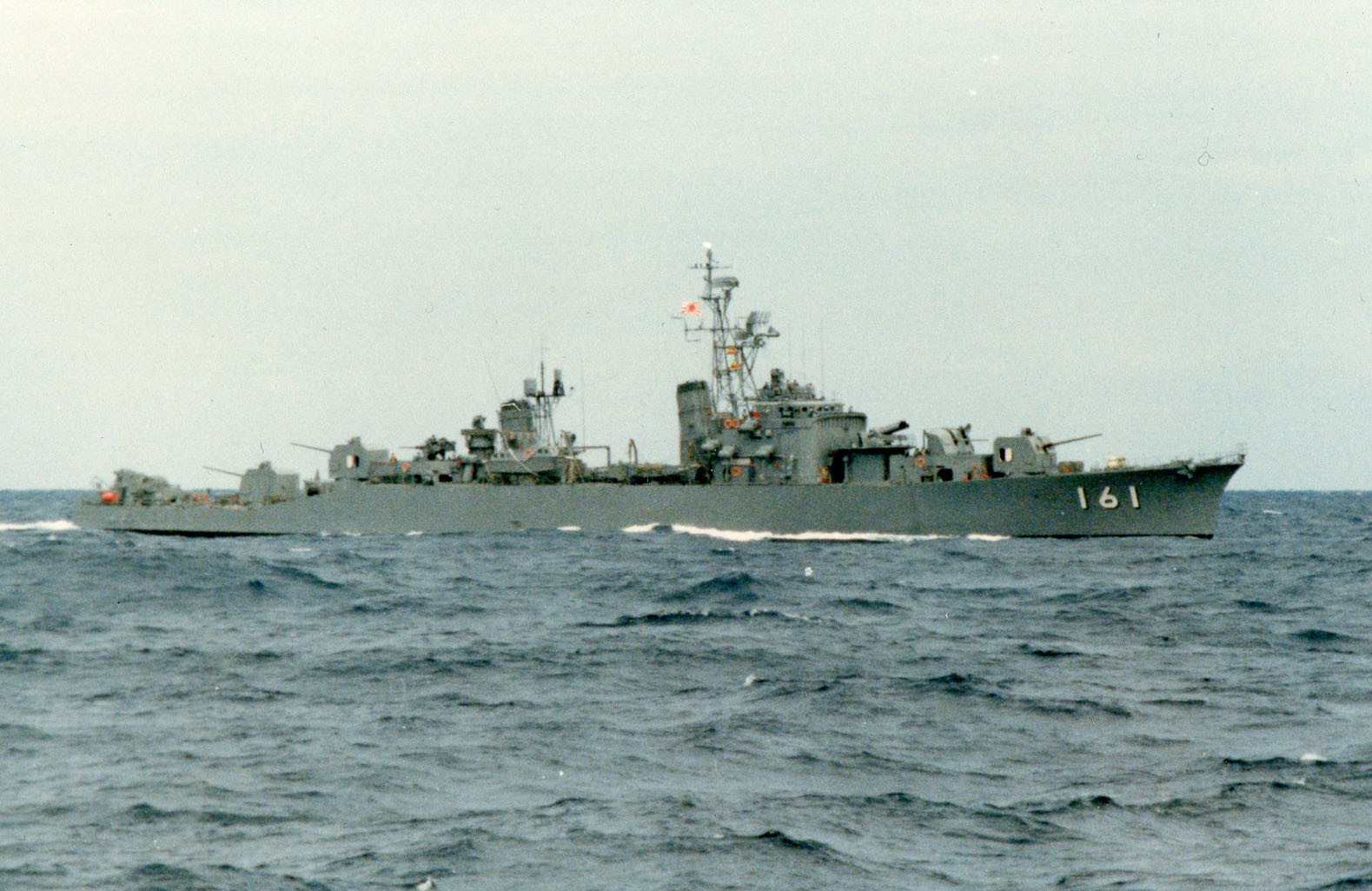
- JDS Akizuki

Class overview
- Name: Akizuki class
- Builders: Mitsubishi Shipbuilding & Eng. Co.; Kobe Shipyard & Eng. Works
- Operators: Japan Maritime Self-Defense Force
- Preceded by: Murasame class
- Succeeded by: Yamagumo class
- In service: 1960–1993
- Completed: 2
- Retired: 2

General characteristics
- Type: Destroyer
- Displacement: 2,350 long tons (2,388 t) standard; 2,890 long tons (2,936 t) normal
- Length: 118 m (387 ft 2 in)
- Beam: 12 m (39 ft 4 in)
- Draft: 4 m (13 ft 1 in)
- Propulsion: 2 Mitsubishi-Escher-Weiss (on Akizuki) or Westinghouse (on Teruzuki) steam turbines, 4 Mitsubishi CE-type boilers 45,000 shp (34,000 kW) / 2 shafts, 2 propellers
- Speed: 32 knots (59 km/h; 37 mph) max.
- Complement: 330
- Sensors & processing systems: Mark 57 fire-control system; Mark 63 fire-control system; OPS-1 air search radar; OPS-5 surface-search radar; AN/SQS-4 sonar; AN/SQR-8 sonar; QQA-1A sonar
- Electronic warfare & decoys: NOLR-1 ESM
- Armament: 3 × 5"/54 caliber Mk.16 guns; 4 × 3"/50 caliber Mk.22 guns (Type 57); 1 × Mk.108 ASW rocket launcher; 2 × Hedgehog ASW mortars; 1 x 4 Bofors 375 mm (15 in) ASW rocket launcher (replaced Mk. 108 in 1976); 2 × Mk.2 ASW torpedo racks; 4 × 533 mm (21 in) torpedo tubes; 2 × Y-gun Depth charge throwers; 2 × Depth charge racks

The Akizuki-class destroyer was a destroyer class built for the Japan Maritime Self-Defense Force (JMSDF) in the late 1950s. This class was planned to be a flotilla leader with the enhanced command and control capability, so sometimes this class was classified as the "DDC" (commanding destroyer) unofficially.

== Design ==
Initially, the American Military Assistance Advisory Group-Japan (MAAG-J) recommended a modified version of the American Fletcher class, but Japan had already constructed surface combatants of their own at that time. As a result, the project of this class was financed by the Off Shore Procurement (OSP) of the United States, but design and construction were completely indigenous.

Like its predecessors, the Murasame and Ayanami classes, this class adopted a "long forecastle" design with inclined afterdeck called "Holland Slope", named after the scenic sloping street in Nagasaki City. With the enlargement of the hull, the steam turbine propulsion system was uprated with higher-pressure boilers (570 psi).

This class was equipped with both the gunnery weapons of the Murasame class and the torpedo/mine weapons of the Ayanami class. Alongside these anti-submarine weapons, and similar to those of the Ayanami class, the Akizuki class were the first vessels equipped with a Mk.108 Weapon Alpha. While the JMSDF desired this American ASW rocket launcher originally, it became clear that its performance wasn't as good as was believed. It was later replaced by a Type 71 375 mm (15 in) quadruple ASW rocket launcher (the Japanese version of the Swedish M/50) in 1976.

Pennant no.	Name	Laid down	Launched	Commissioned	Decommissioned
DD-161; ASU-7010	Akizuki	31 July 1958	26 June 1959	13 February 1960	7 December 1993
DD-162; ASU-7012; TV-3504	Teruzuki	15 August 1958	24 June 1959	29 February 1960	27 September 1993

== See also ==
- List of destroyers of Japan

Equivalent destroyers of the same era

- T 47 class
- Daring class
- Friesland class
- Halland class
- Impetuoso class
- Forrest Sherman class
- Kotlin class
- Hamburg class
