= JDS Teruzuki =

Akizuki-class destroyer

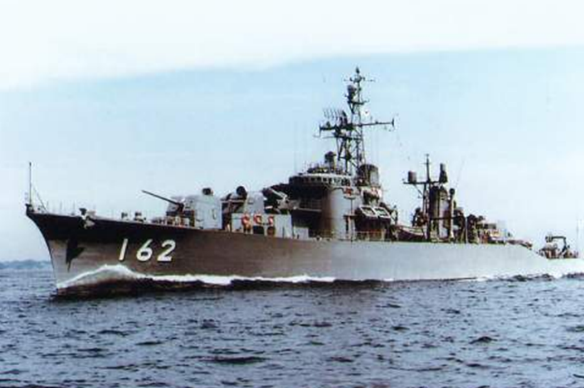
- JDS Teruzuki

History

Japan
- Name: Teruzuki; (てるづき)
- Namesake: Teruzuki (1941)
- Ordered: 1957
- Builder: Mitsubishi Heavy Industries
- Laid down: 15 August 1958
- Launched: 24 June 1959
- Commissioned: 19 February 1960
- Decommissioned: 27 September 1993
- Reclassified: Training ship, 1 July 1987
- Home port: Yokosuka
- Identification: DD-162, DD-961; ASU-7012; TV-3504
- Fate: Sunk as target, 14 July 1994

General characteristics
- Class & type: Akizuki-class destroyer
- Displacement: 2,350 long tons (2,388 t) standard; 2,890 long tons (2,936 t) normal
- Length: 118 m (387 ft 2 in)
- Beam: 12 m (39 ft 4 in)
- Draft: 4 m (13 ft 1 in)
- Propulsion: 2 steam turbines, 4 boilers 45,000 shp (34,000 kW) / 2 shafts, 2 propellers
- Speed: 32 knots (59 km/h; 37 mph) max.
- Complement: 330
- Sensors & processing systems: Mk.57 fire-control system; Mk.63 fire-control system; OPS-1 air search radar; OPS-5 surface-search radar; AN/SQS-4 sonar; AN/SQR-8 sonar; QQA-1A sonar
- Electronic warfare & decoys: NOLR-1 ESM
- Armament: 3 × 5"/54 caliber Mk.16 guns; 4 × 3"/50 caliber Mk.22 guns (Type 57); 1 × Mk.108 ASW rocket launcher; 2 × Hedgehog ASW mortars; 2 × Mk.2 ASW torpedo racks; 4 × 533 mm (21 in) torpedo tubes; 2 × Y-gun Depth charge throwers; 2 × Depth charge racks

JDS Teruzuki (DD-162) was a Japanese Akizuki-class destroyer. The vessel was laid down in 1958 and served as a front line warship with the Japan Maritime Self-Defense Force until 1986, and as an auxiliary until 1993.

== Development and design ==
Teruzuki was one of two Akizuki-class destroyers ordered in 1957 by the United States for Japan as part of a military aid package. Although the two destroyers were paid for by the United States, and therefore had hull numbers under the US Navy designation scheme, with Teruzuki having the hull number DD-961, they were built in Japanese shipyards to local designs.

The two destroyers were equipped as flotilla leaders, and had the same main gun armament of three American 5-inch (127 mm)/54 caliber guns as used in the previous Murasame class, with four 3-inch (76 mm) anti-aircraft guns in two twin mounts. Anti-submarine armament consisted of a Weapon Alpha anti-submarine rocket launcher, two Hedgehog anti-submarine projectors and two depth charge launchers. A single quadruple mount for 21-inch (533 mm) torpedoes was fitted, with a single set of reload torpedoes.

== Construction and career ==
Teruzuki was laid down by Mitsubishi at Kobe in Japan on 15 August 1958, launched on 24 June 1959 and commissioned with the pennant number DD-162 on 29 February 1960. 1957 budget plan ship on the United States side by procurement outside the United States (OSP, procurement of the recipient country) based on the mutual defense assistance agreement between Japan and the United States It was launched on 24 June 1959, and after being put into service as the US Navy-registered ship (DD-961) on 29 February 1960, it was provided to the Maritime Self-Defense Force and incorporated into the Yokosuka District Force.

On 1 September 1961, the escort fleet was newly formed under the control of the Self-Defense Fleet and became the first flagship of the escort fleet.

Collision with a cargo ship at Uraga Suido on 30 March 1963. The accident occurred in the rear part of the starboard side, it was damaged and five crew members were killed.

On 3 December 1963, the escort fleet flagship was transferred to the escort ship Akizuki.

Incorporated as a flagship into the 1st Escort Group on 10 December 1964.

In May 1968, the depth charge drop rail on the stern and the depth charge projector were removed, and VDS (Variable Depth Sonar) was installed.

On 1 February 1971, the 4th Escort Group was newly formed under the escort fleet and incorporated as a flagship.

Sumitomo Heavy Industries removed the Mk.108 anti-submarine launcher, hedgehog, and Mk.2 short torpedo launcher from September 1976, and refurbished it with a 71-type Bofors rocket launcher and a triple short torpedo launcher. Received at the Industrial Uraga Shipyard and completed on 31 January 1977.

On 30 March 1984, it was incorporated into the 3rd Escort Group as a ship under direct control, and the fixed port was transferred to Maizuru.

On 27 March 1986, the type was changed to a special service ship, and the ship registration number was changed to (ASU-7012). Transferred to the Maizuru District Force as a ship under direct control. At that time, the 53 cm4 torpedo launcher and VDS were removed.

On 1 July 1987, the ship was converted to a training ship, and the ship registration number was changed to (TV-3504). Transferred to Training Squadron 1st Training Squadron.

On 20 June 1991, the type was changed to a special service ship again, and it was transferred to the 1st Submarine Group as a ship under direct control.

She was decommissioned on 27 September 1993.

The following day, from June 1994, he was dressed as a target ship at the Kegoya Dock in Kure, and on 14 July, the same year, she was sunk as a target for an anti-ship missile launched by an Air Self-Defense Force aircraft off the coast of Hachinohe.

== Gallery ==
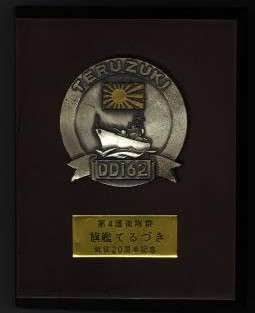
JDS Teruzuki’s 20th anniversary shield.
