= RUR-4 Weapon Alpha =

Weapon Alpha
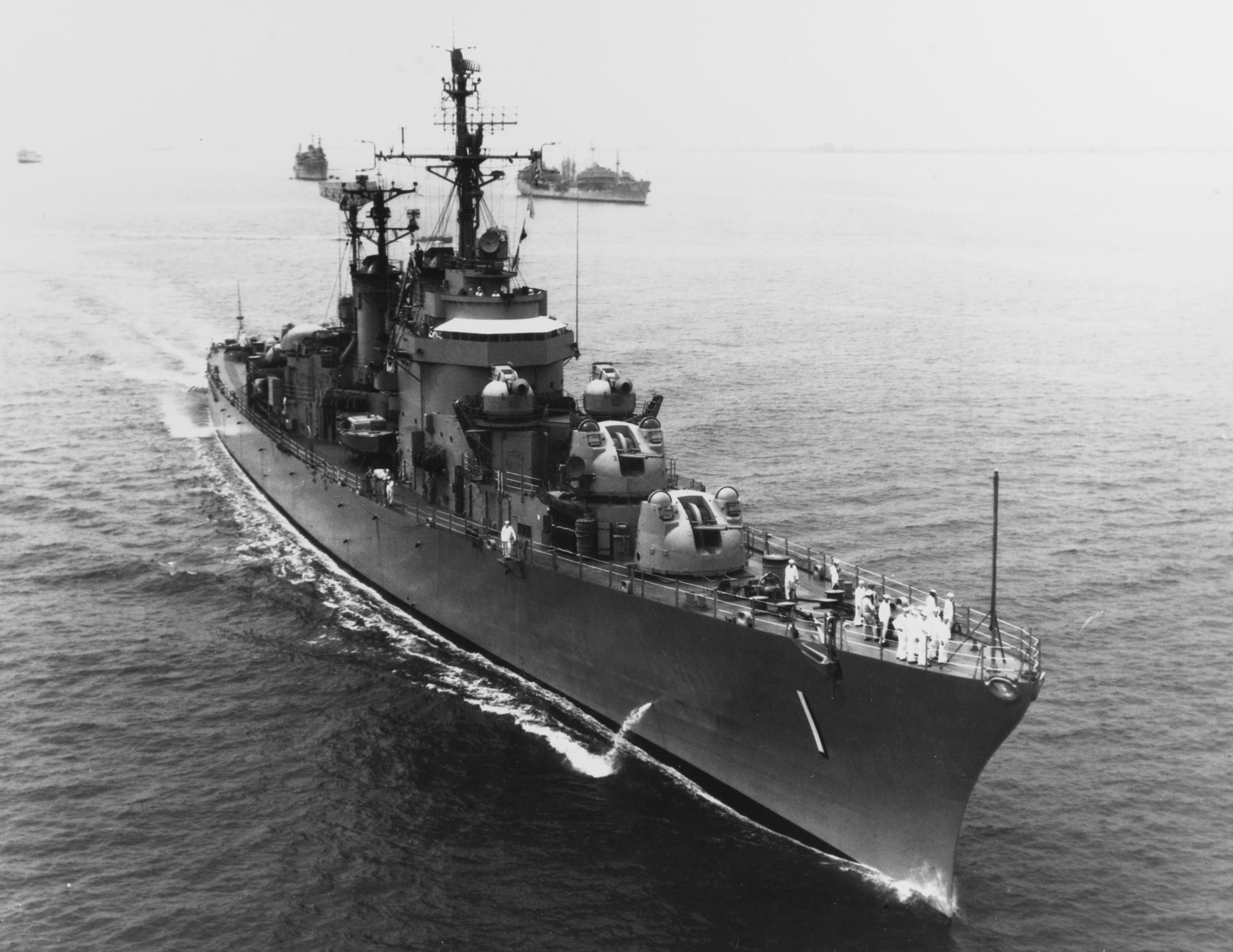
- USS Norfolk (DL-1) was one of the few ships outfitted with Weapon Alpha. Two of the four mounts can be seen side-by-side forward of the bridge.
- Type: Anti-submarine rocket
- Place of origin: United States

Service history
- In service: 1951–1969
- Used by: United States Navy; Japan

Production history
- Designer: Naval Ordnance Test Station
- Designed: 1946–1949

Specifications (Mark 1)
- Mass: 525 pounds (238 kg)
- Length: 8 feet 6 inches (2.6 m)
- Diameter: 12.75 inches (324 mm)
- Warhead: High explosive
- Warhead weight: 250 pounds (110 kg)
- Detonation mechanism: Depth charge
- Engine: 5.25 in (133 mm) rocket
- Propellant: Solid fuel
- Operational range: 800 yards (730 m)
- Maximum speed: 190 miles per hour (310 km/h)
- Launch platform: Ships

The RUR-4 "Weapon Alpha" (originally Weapon Able) was an American naval ahead-throwing anti-submarine rocket launcher. It was designed between 1946 and 1949, and was installed on warships from 1951 to 1969. Unlike depth charges, it was designed to attack enemy submarines without requiring the attacking ship to be located directly above the submarine being attacked.

== Development ==
Similar to the earlier American Mousetrap, 375mm (14.8") Swedish Bofors, and 250mm (9.8") and 300mm (11.8") Soviet systems, all of which use multiple rockets, Weapon Alpha was developed toward the end of World War II, in response to the German Type XXI U-boat. Begun in a crash program in 1944–5 and put in service before undergoing operational evaluation, it emerged in 1949 as a 227-kg (500 lb) 127mm (5") rocket with a 113-kg (250 lb) warhead that sank at 12 m/s (40 ft/s) (compared to a depth charge, which sank at 2.7–5 m/s (8.9–16.5 ft/s)), an influence or time pistol, and a range of 360–730 m (400–800 yd). Coupled to the new SQG-1 depth-finding sonar (for setting the time fuse, rather than the hydrostatic pistol of a depth charge), it was to be fired from a revolving Mark 108 launcher (with 22 rounds of ready ammunition) at up to twelve rounds per minute. The ready-service magazine could not be reloaded while Weapon Alpha was in use.

It was replaced by the RUR-5 ASROC, which was developed by the U.S. Navy in the 1950s. Nonetheless, Weapon Alpha remained in service through the 1960s until supplanted by ASROC.

== Gallery ==
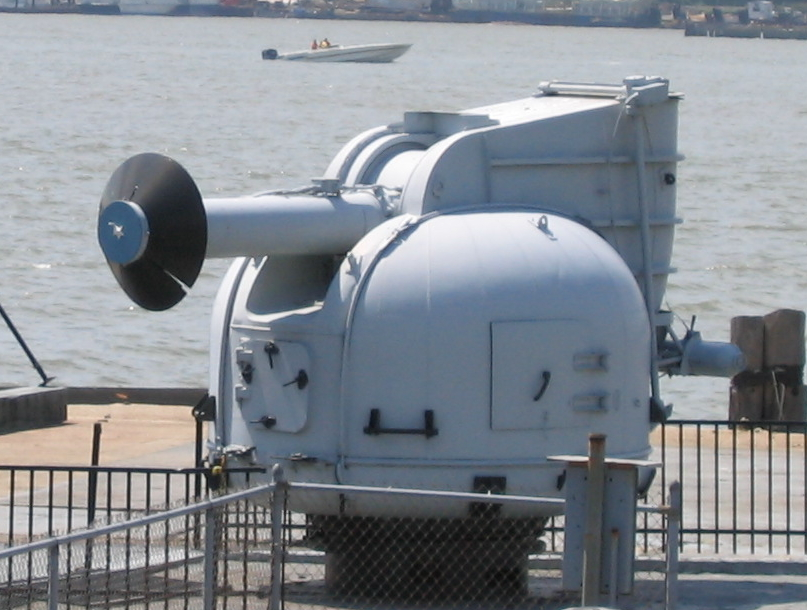
A dismounted Mk 108 launcher at the Intrepid Sea-Air-Space Museum.

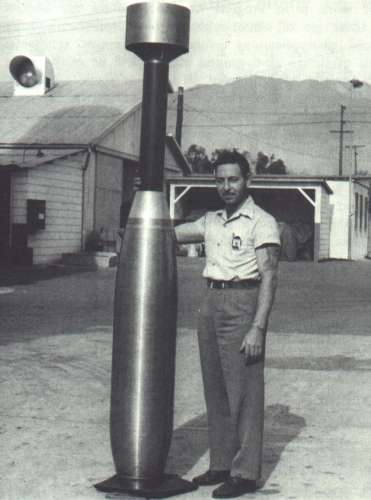
The RUR-4's rocket round.

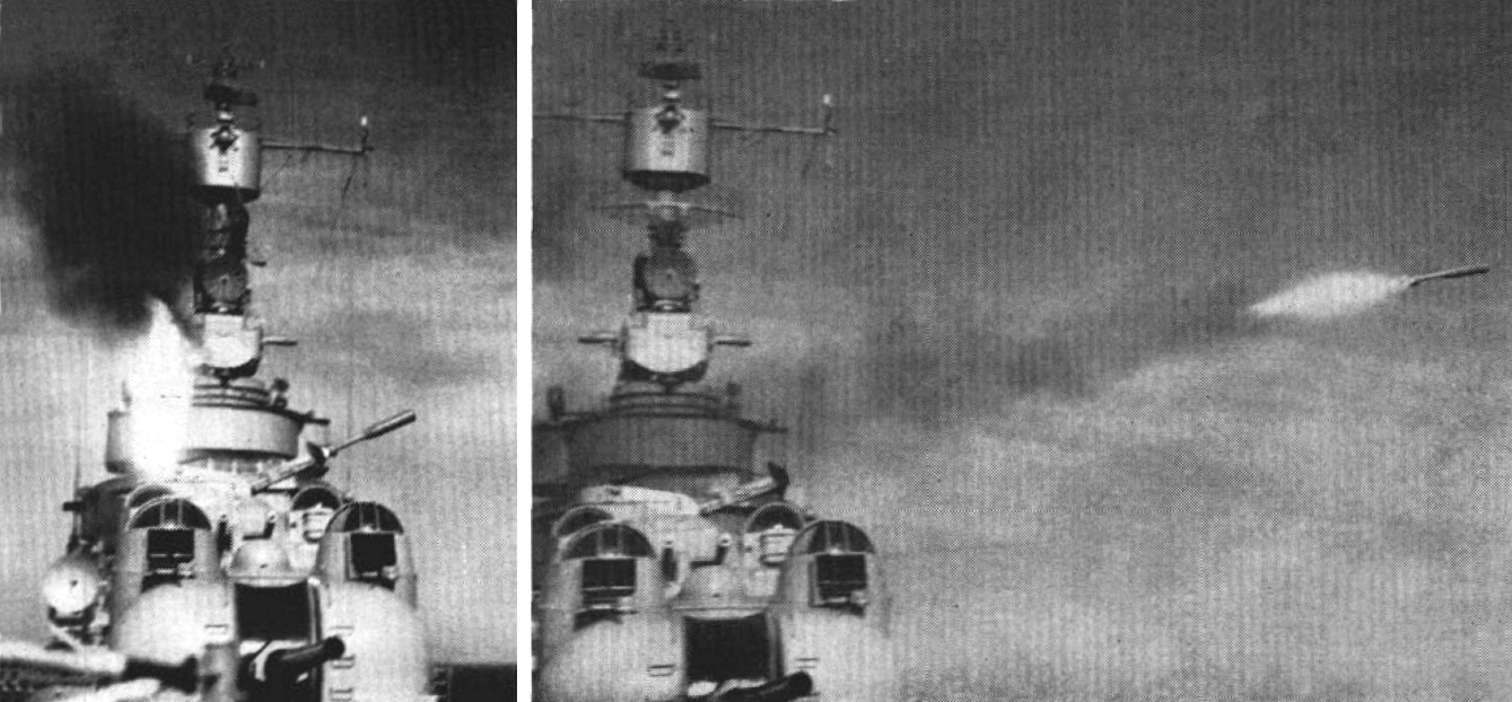
RUR-4 launch from USS Wilkinson (DL-5), 1956.

== Sources ==
- Fitzsimons, Bernard, ed. Encyclopedia of Twentieth Century Weapons and Warfare (London: Phoebus Publishing Co, 1978), "Weapon Alpha", Volume 24, p. 2589.
- Fitzsimons, Bernard, ed. Encyclopedia of Twentieth Century Weapons and Warfare (London: Phoebus Publishing Co, 1978), "Mousetrap", Volume 19, pp. 1946-7.
- Fitzsimons, Bernard, ed. Encyclopedia of Twentieth Century Weapons and Warfare (London: Phoebus Publishing Co, 1978), "Depth Charge", Volume 7, p. 730.
- Parsch, Andreas (2002). "NOTS RUR-4 Weapon Alpha". Directory of U.S. Military Rockets and Missiles. designation-systems.net.
- DiGiulian, Tony Navweaps.com US ASW weapons page
