= Roger L. Easton =

American physicist and GPS inventor (1921–2014)

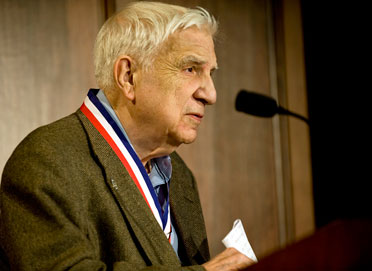
- Roger L. Easton at the National Inventors Hall of Fame. Source National Inventors Hall of Fame 2010
- Born: April 30, 1921; Craftsbury, Vermont
- Died: May 8, 2014 (aged 93); Hanover, New Hampshire
- Education: Middlebury College (AB, Physics)
- Occupation: Scientist
- Known for: Inventor and designer of the GPS

Roger Lee Easton Sr. (April 30, 1921 – May 8, 2014) was an American physicist and state representative who was the principal inventor and designer of the Global Positioning System, along with Ivan A. Getting and Bradford Parkinson.

== Career ==
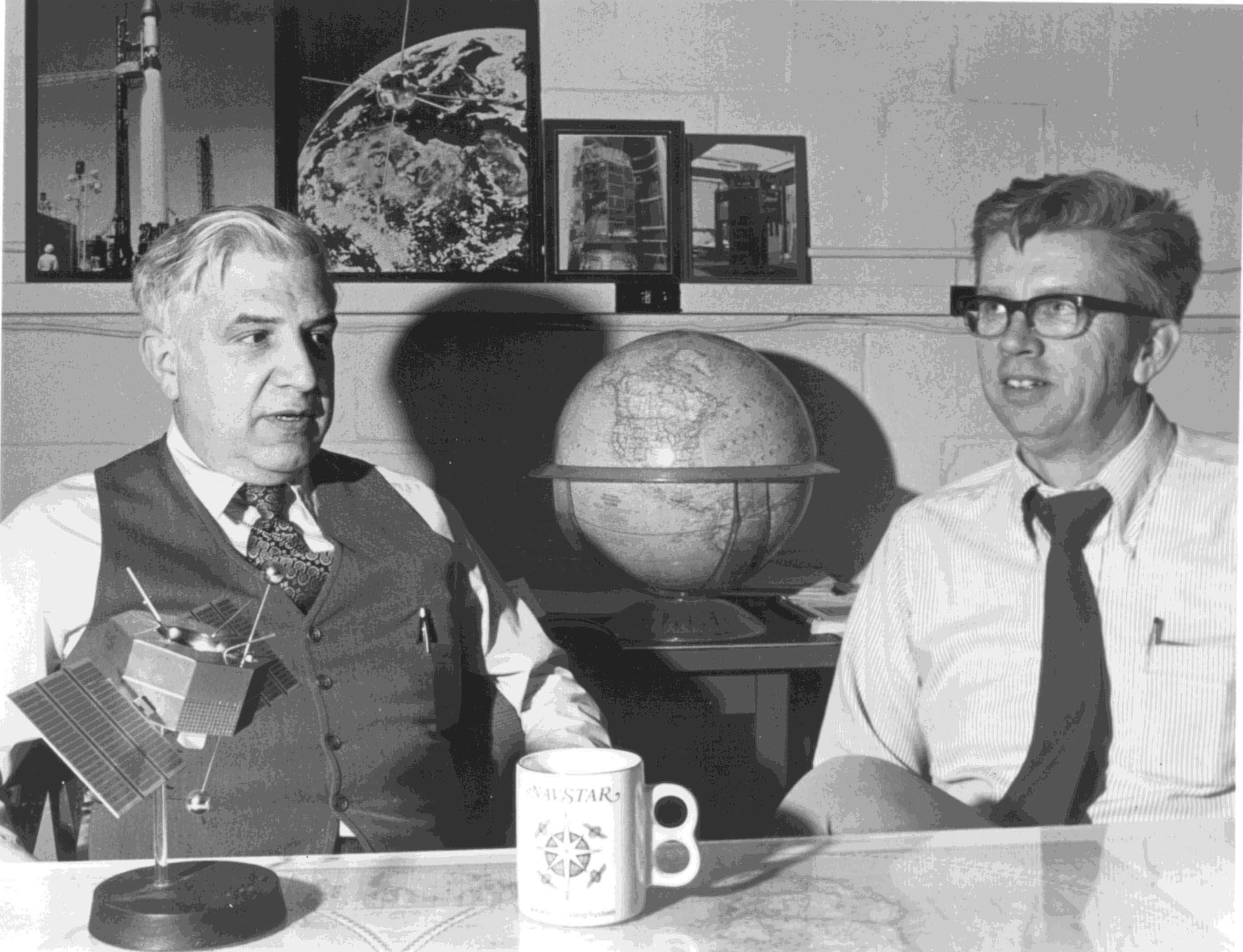
The Naval Research Laboratory’s managers for the Timation program and, later, the GPS program: Roger L. Easton (left) and Al Bartholomew.

In 1943, Easton began his career by joining the Naval Research Laboratory. He played a large role in developing orbiting spacecraft for military purposes.

In 1955, Easton co-wrote the Naval Research Laboratory's Project Vanguard proposal for a U.S. satellite program in competition with two other proposals, including a proposal from the U.S. Army prepared by Wernher von Braun. The Eisenhower Administration selected Project Vanguard. In 1957, Easton invented the Minitrack tracking system to determine the Vanguard satellite's orbit. When Sputnik I was launched, Easton extended the system to actively follow unknown orbiting satellites.

In 1959, he designed the Naval Space Surveillance (NAVSPASUR) system. The Naval Space Surveillance System became the first system to detect and track all types of Earth-orbiting objects. It goes through the 33rd parallel, which is effectively coast to coast of the US.

Later in his career at NRL, Easton conceived, patented, and led the development of essential enabling technologies for the United States Global Positioning System (GPS). During the 1960s and early 1970s he developed a time-based navigational system with passive ranging, circular orbits, and space-borne high precision clocks placed in satellites. The idea was tested with four experimental satellites: TIMATION I and II (in 1967 and 1969) and Navigation Technology Satellites (NTS) 1 and 2 (in 1974 and 1977). NTS-2 was the first satellite to transmit GPS signals.

== Personal life ==
Easton was born on April 30, 1921, in Craftsbury, Vermont, to Dr. Frank B. Easton, a physician, and Della Donnocker, a school teacher. He studied physics at Middlebury College and graduated in 1943. He also attended the University of Michigan for 1 semester before joining the Naval Research Laboratory in 1943. At the Naval Research Laboratory he worked in the Radio Division on radar beacons and blind-landing systems. Easton also worked in the laboratory's Rocket-Sonde Branch which was dealing with space related research.

Easton retired in 1980. In 1986, Easton ran for Governor and served three terms on the Board of the New Hampshire Electric Cooperative.

Easton died on May 8, 2014, at the age of 93.

== Awards ==
Easton was elected to the American Philosophical Society in 1998. George W. Bush awarded Easton the National Medal of Technology for his "extensive pioneering achievements in spacecraft tracking, navigation and timing technology that led to the development of the NAVSTAR-Global Positioning System (GPS)" in 2006. The National Medal of Technology is the highest honor awarded for technology.

On March 31, 2010, Easton was inducted into the National Inventors Hall of Fame and presented the NIHF Medal of Honor for the development of TIMed navigATION (TIMATION – U.S. patent 3,789,409 that provided both accurate position and precise time to terrestrial based observers, an important foundation for contemporary Global Positioning Systems.

During his career at the Naval Research Laboratory, Easton was awarded:

- The Distinguished Civilian Service Award (1960)
- The Institute of Navigation's Colonel Thomas L. Thurlow Navigation Award (1978)
- The Naval Space Surveillance Center established the Roger L. Easton Science and Engineering Award (1991)
- Inducted into the GPS Hall of Fame (1996)
- Magellanic Premium (1997)
- 12th Sheikh Salam Al-Ali Al-Sabah Informatics Badge of Honour from His Highness, the Amir of Kuwait, for Easton's role as the "Prime Inventor of GPS" (2013)
