= JDS Hayabusa =

Submarine chaser of the JMSDF

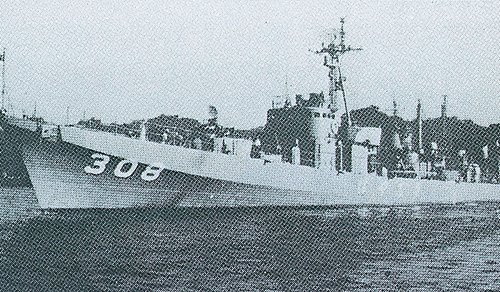
- JDS Hayabusa

History

Japan
- Name: Hayabusa; (はやぶさ)
- Namesake: Hayabusa
- Ordered: 1954
- Builder: MHI, Nagasaki
- Laid down: 23 May 1956
- Launched: 20 November 1956
- Commissioned: 10 June 1957
- Decommissioned: 28 February 1987
- Reclassified: ASY-91, 1 October 1975
- Home port: Ōminato (1957-1960); Kure (1960-1977); Yokosuka (1977-1987)
- Identification: Pennant number: PC-308
- Fate: Unknown

Class overview
- Preceded by: Kamome class
- Succeeded by: Umitaka class

General characteristics
- Type: Submarine chaser
- Displacement: 380 t (370 long tons) standard; 420 t (410 long tons) full load
- Length: 58 m (190 ft 3 in)
- Beam: 7.8 m (25 ft 7 in)
- Draft: 2.0 m (6 ft 7 in)
- Depth: 4.1 m (13 ft 5 in)
- Propulsion: 2 × Mitsui B&W 1222VBU-3 4V diesel electric engines; 1 × Mitsubishi MUK-501 gas turbines; 3 × shafts
- Speed: 26 kn (48 km/h; 30 mph)
- Complement: 75
- Sensors & processing systems: AN/SPS-5B air-search radar; AN/SQS-11A sonar; Mark 63 fire-control system
- Armament: 1 × twin Bofors 40 mm gun; 1 × hedgehog anti-submarine mortar; 2 × Y-gun depth charge thrower; 2 × Type 54 depth charge racks

JDS Hayabusa (PC-308) was a submarine chaser of the Japan Maritime Self-Defense Force (JMSDF) in the mid-1950s. She was later converted to an accommodation ship and redesignated as ASY-91. She was the third vessel to inherit the name after the Imperial Japanese Navy's Hayabusa-class torpedo boat Hayabusa and Ōtori-class torpedo boat Hayabusa.

== Overview ==
The Maritime Self-Defense Force plans to build seven A-type submarine chasers and one B-type submarine chaser in the 1954 plan, of which four A-type submarines were Kari-class and three Kamome-class.

The Hayabusa was the first CODAG propulsion boat of the Maritime Self-Defense Force to experimentally equip a gas turbine for boosters in addition to diesel as the main machine.

The gas turbine mounted on the Hayabusa was a MUK501 developed by the Technical Research and Development Institute of the Defense Agency (at that time) and manufactured by Mitsubishi Shipbuilding Nagasaki Shipyard & Machinery Works, and is the same as the one mounted on the training ship Hokuto Maru of the Ministry of Transport. It is a model. Although this gas turbine suffered from damage to the turbine blades, it was repeatedly improved and operated, and it was able to demonstrate 20 knots with the diesel main engine alone and 26 knots with the gas turbine. Only diesel was in operation during cruising.

Since the Hayabusa was a high-speed boat that used a gas turbine as its engine, various considerations were made, and the bridge and other parts had a similar appearance to the Kari and Kamome-class, but the hull shape was large. Unlike, it has a large knuckle on the side from the bow to the bridge, improving the seakeeping ability during high-speed navigation. The hull width is also 1 meter wider than the Kari and Kamome-class. The deck room at the rear of the bridge was equipped with a large chimney for gas turbines and intake ports for gas turbines on both sides, and a small funnel for diesel main engines was installed on the rear deck room.

The armament was the same as the Kari and Kamome-class.

== Construction and career ==
Hayabusa was laid down on 23 May 1956 and launched on 20 November 1956 by Mitsubishi Heavy Industries Nagasaki Shipyard. She was commissioned on 10 June 1957 and was incorporated into the Ōminato District Force.

On January 16, 1958, she was transferred to the Ōminato District Force's 2nd Submarine Chaser Corps. At the time of service, her gas turbine was not completed and was not installed, but installation work was carried out in February 1962, and the funnel for the gas turbine was extended accordingly.

The 2nd Submarine Chaser Corps was organized into 3 Kamome-class ships, but the kinetic performance was quite different, so the organization did not change even after the gas turbine was installed.

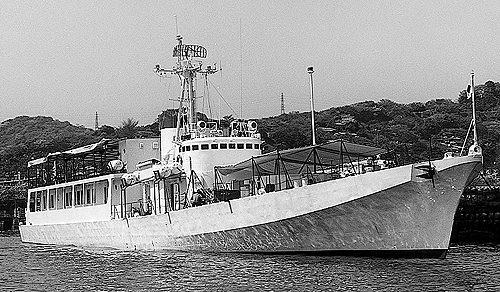
Hayabusa (ASY-91) after remodeling

Hayabusa was only active boat equipped with a gas turbine in the Maritime Self-Defense Force, but in 1970 the central shaft for the gas turbine was damaged, and her gas turbine engine and central shaft were removed in April of the same year. For this reason, only diesel engines have been operated since then.

On March 1, 1960, the 2nd Submarine Chaser Corps was reorganized under the Kure District Force. Due to the wide deck width of the rear deck of Hayabusa, it was decided to remodel it into a accommodation boat due to the deterioration of the accommodation ship Yuchidori, and on October 1, 1977, the type was changed to an accommodation ship (ASY-91) and incorporated into the Yokosuka District Force.

After undergoing remodeling work on a Yokohama Yacht Co., the work was completed and recommissioned on April 20, 1978.

She was decommissioned on February 28, 1987.
