= MV Namura Queen =

Panamax bulk carrier cargo ship

History
- Name: Namura Queen
- Owner: Japan (Nissen Kaiun)
- Operator: Philippine company
- Port of registry: Panama
- Builder: Sasebo Heavy Industries
- Yard number: 872
- Completed: May 2020
- Identification: IMO number: 9841299; MMSI number: 355706000; Callsign: H9OM
- Status: Shelled on 25 February 2022 by a Russian warship in the Black Sea during 2022 Russian invasion of Ukraine, assisted into port in Yalova, Turkey, by the Ukrainian tugboat P&O Star, arrived in 27 February.

General characteristics
- Type: Panamax bulk carrier
- Tonnage: 47,146 GT
- Length: 229 m (751 ft 4 in)
- Beam: 38 m (124 ft 8 in)
- Draught: 6.9 m (22 ft 8 in)
- Installed power: Diesel
- Crew: 20

MV Namura Queen is a Japanese-owned, Panamanian-registered, and Philippine-operated bulk carrier cargo ship.

== Characteristics ==
The Namura Queen is a Panamax-sized bulk carrier built by the Japanese shipbuilding company Sasebo Heavy Industries. Registered in Panama, its crew consists of twenty people, all of whom are Filipinos. It has a gross tonnage of 47,146 tons and a deadweight tonnage of 85,065 tons. It is 229 m (751 ft 4 in) long, 38 m (124 ft 8 in) wide, and has a draught of 6.9 m (22 ft 8 in). The ship has seven holds for storing the grain it transports. It is propelled by a single fixed pitch propeller powered by a diesel engine creating 9,700 kW (13,000 hp).

== Shelling incident ==
On 15 February 2022, the Namura Queen departed from Porto Torres, Italy, and went underway to the Ukrainian port city of Yuzhne to receive a shipment of grain, arriving on 23 February. On 25 February, while in transit in the Black Sea, heading to Istanbul, Turkey, after departing from Yuzhne, the cargo ship was struck on its stern side by ordnance fired from a Russian warship participating in the 2022 Russian invasion of Ukraine. The explosion caused a fire to start on the ship, and one of the twenty crew received a slight injury to their shoulder. The Namura Queen was able to continue under its own propulsion, but it was assisted to a port in Yalova, Turkey, by the Ukrainian tugboat P&O Star, arriving on 27 February.

== See also ==
- MV Millennial Spirit
