= Ivan Getting =

American physicist and engineer

- Born: Ivan Alexander Getting; January 18, 1912; New York City, New York, U.S.
- Died: October 11, 2003 (aged 91); Coronado, California
- Occupations: Physicist, Electrical Engineer
- Known for: Global Positioning System

Ivan Alexander Getting (January 18, 1912 – October 11, 2003) was an American physicist and electrical engineer, credited (along with Roger L. Easton and Bradford Parkinson) with the development of the Global Positioning System (GPS). He was the co-leader (the other being Louis Ridenour) of the research group which developed the SCR-584, an automatic microwave tracking fire-control system, which enabled M9 Gun Director directed anti-aircraft guns to destroy a significant percentage of the German V-1 flying bombs launched against London late in the Second World War.

Getting was born on January 18, 1912 in New York City to a family of Slovak immigrants from Bytča, Slovakia and grew up in Pittsburgh, Pennsylvania. He attended the Massachusetts Institute of Technology (MIT) as an Edison Scholar (S.B. Physics, 1933); and Merton College, Oxford as a Graduate Rhodes Scholar (D.Phil., 1935) in astrophysics.

He worked at Harvard University on nuclear instrumentation and cosmic rays (Junior Fellow, 1935–1940) and the MIT Radiation Laboratory (1940-1950; Director of the Division on Fire Control and Army Radar, Associate Professor 1945; Professor 1946). During the Second World War he was a special consultant to Secretary of War Henry L. Stimson on the Army's use of radar. He also served as head of the Naval Fire Control Section of the Office of Scientific Research and Development, member of the Combined Chiefs of Staff Committee on Searchlight and Fire Control, and head of the Radar Panel of the Research and Development Board of the Department of Defense.

In 1950, during the Korean War, Getting became Assistant for Development Planning, Deputy Chief of Staff, United States Air Force; and in 1951, Vice President for Engineering and Research at the Raytheon Corporation (1951-1960). While at Raytheon, Getting also served on the Undersea Warfare Committee of the National Research Council.

In 1960, he was founding President of The Aerospace Corporation (1960-1977). The corporation was established at the request of the Secretary of the Air Force as a non-profit organization to apply "the full resources of modern science and technology to the problem of achieving those continued advances in ballistic missiles and space systems, which are basic to national security." Getting was a founding member of the Air Force Scientific Advisory Group (later renamed the Scientific Advisory Board) and chair of its Electronics Panel. Getting retired from The Aerospace Corporation in 1977.

In 1978, he served as President of the Institute of Electrical and Electronics Engineers. He also served on the board of directors of the Northrop Corporation and the Board of Trustees of the Environmental Research Institute of Michigan.

== Death ==
Getting died on October 11, 2003, in Coronado, California, aged 91.

== Major technical and administrative contributions ==
While at MIT Radiation Laboratory, Getting's group developed the first automatic microwave tracking fire control radar, the SCR 584. This system, along with the proximity fuze, significantly reduced damage to London by the V-1 flying bombs (also known as "doodlebugs" or "buzz bombs") launched by Germany from June 1944 of the Second World War, by enabling accurate anti-aircraft fire to destroy the missiles. On 28 August 1944, the last day on which significant numbers of V-1s were launched against London, of 104 fired, 68 were destroyed by artillery, 16 by other means, and 16 crashed.

Getting was an early designer and proponent of satellite-based navigation systems which led to the development and deployment of the Global Positioning System (GPS). While in Raytheon he oversaw the development of the first three-dimensional, time-difference-of-arrival position-finding system – developed in response to an Air Force requirement for a guidance system to be used with a proposed Intercontinental Ballistic Missile (ICBM) that would achieve mobility by traveling on a railroad system. While at The Aerospace Corporation he oversaw studies on the use of satellites as the basis for a navigation system for vehicles moving rapidly in three dimensions. In addition to his technical contributions to GPS, Getting was a tireless advocate of the project in the face of early resistance from the Pentagon.

He was also involved in the development of the first high-speed flip-flop circuit at Harvard. He also was involved in the development of the Navy GFCS MK-56 anti-aircraft fire control system; as well as in the development and building of a 350 MeV synchrotron at MIT Radiation Laboratory. He also was involved in the development of the Sparrow III and Hawk missile systems; as well as commercial production of transistors at Raytheon.

As a consultant to the US government: implementation of the Quick Reaction Capability for Electronic Counter-Measures; establishment of the SHAPE Supreme Headquarters Allied Powers Europe Laboratory at the Hague; deployment of U.S. air defense capability called the Semi-Automatic Ground Environment (SAGE) radar system; direction of studies on MX missile basing and long-range combat aircraft; technical analysis and design of a long-range supersonic bomber capable of reaching the former Soviet Union and returning without refueling (Getting's work is credited in the reinstatement of the B-1 bomber funding by the U.S. Congress).

As member of the Undersea Warfare Committee of the National Research Council: Associate Director of Project Nobska sponsored by the U.S. Navy and concerning submarine warfare weapons; recommended a submarine-based, solid-propellant intermediate-range ballistic missile that formed the basis for the Polaris missile.

At The Aerospace Corporation: planning for new ballistic missile systems; oversight of space launch systems; development of high-powered chemical lasers; contributions to the Mercury and Gemini space launch systems.

== Major awards and recognitions ==
- Fellow of the American Physical Society (1941)
- Medal for Merit awarded by the President of the United States (1948)
- Naval Ordnance Development Award
- Air Force Exceptional Service Award (1960)
- IEEE Aerospace and Electronic Systems Pioneer Award (1975)
- Kitty Hawk Award (1975)
- IEEE Founders Medal (1989)
- Department of Defense Medal for Distinguished Public Service (1997)
- John Fritz Medal (1998)
- Air Force Space and Missile Pioneers Hall of Fame at Peterson Air Force Base in Colorado Springs
- San Diego Aerospace Museum's International Aerospace Hall of Fame (2002)
- Navy Superior Public Service Award (1999)
- National Academy of Engineering Charles Stark Draper Prize (with Bradford Parkinson, 2003)
- National Inventors Hall of Fame (posthumously, 2004)
- In 2011, he was listed at #10 on the MIT150 list of the top 150 innovators and ideas from MIT
