= Timation =

American satellites

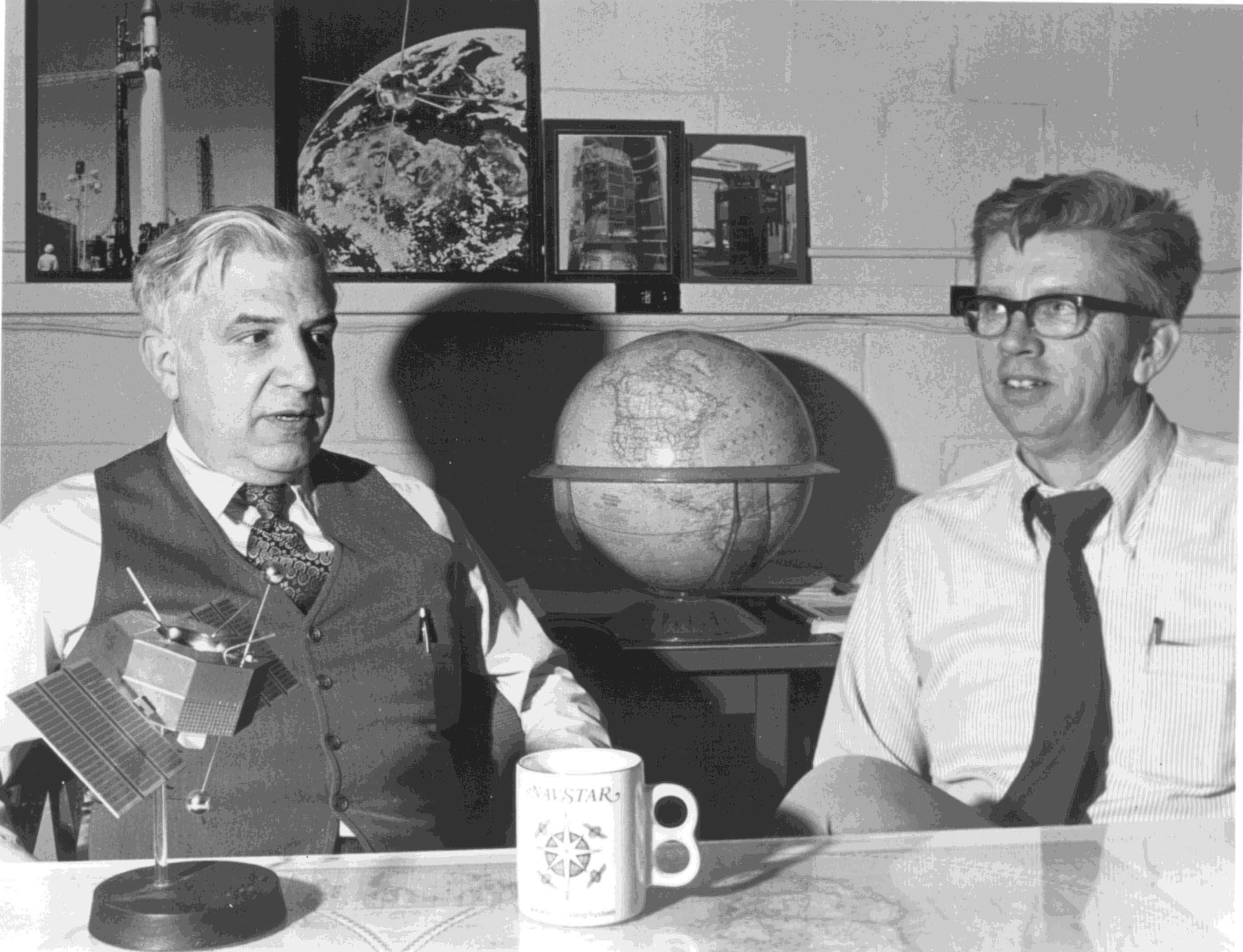
The Naval Research Laboratory’s managers for the Timation program and, later, the GPS program: Roger L. Easton (left) and Al Bartholomew.

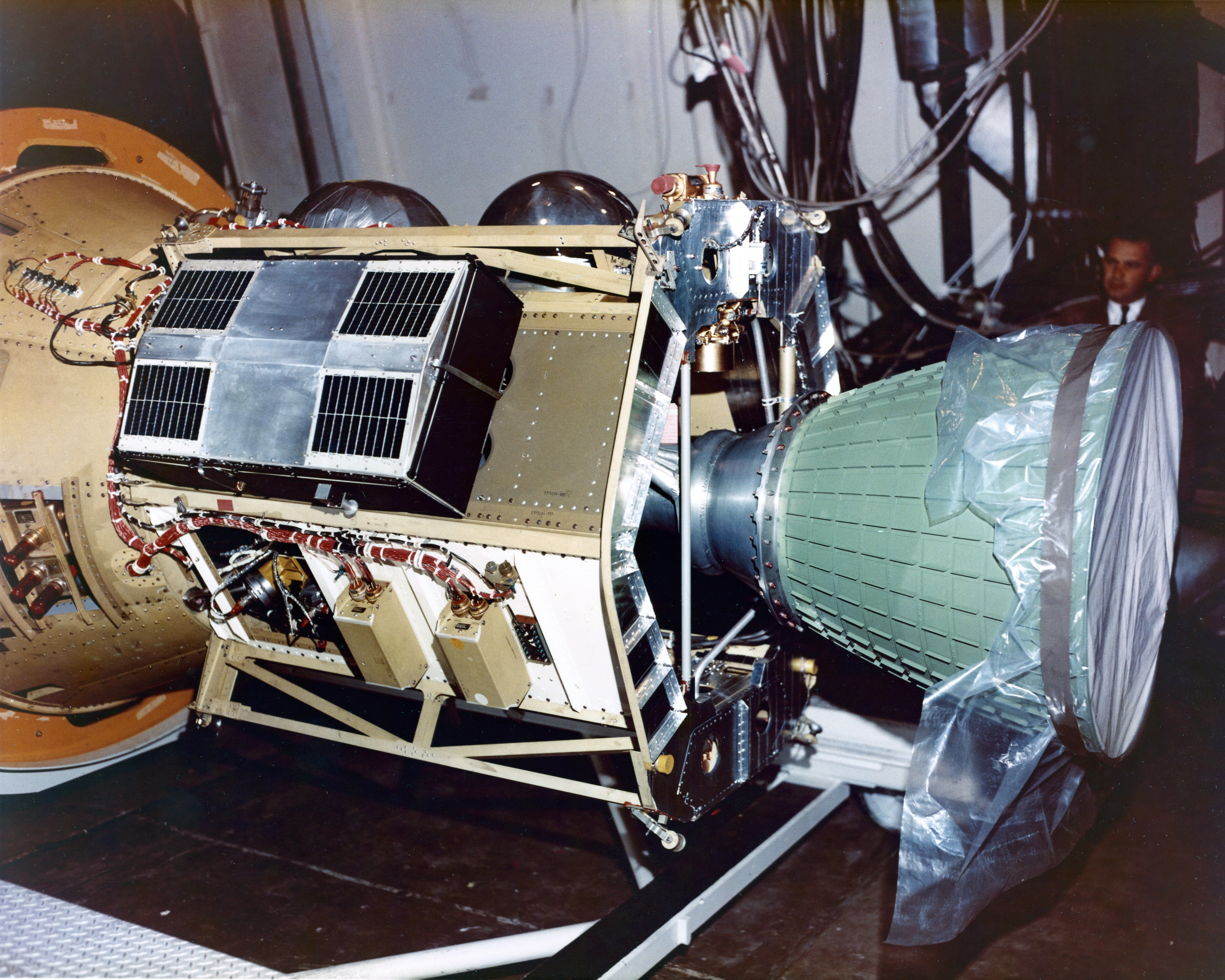
Timation 1 (rectangular object in center of photo), launched May 31, 1967, tested in a "piggyback" launch aboard an Air Force Thor-Agena D rocket

The Timation satellites were conceived, developed, and launched by the United States Naval Research Laboratory in Washington, D.C. beginning in 1964. The concept of Timation was to broadcast an accurate time reference for use as a ranging signal to receivers on the ground.

On 31 May 1967, the Timation 1 satellite was launched. This was followed by the Timation 2 (NRL-PL 169) satellite launch in 1969.

In 1973 the U.S. Navy Timation and the Air Force System 621B navigation system (known as the DNSS - Defense Navigation Satellite System) are consolidated by the Deputy Secretary of Defense.

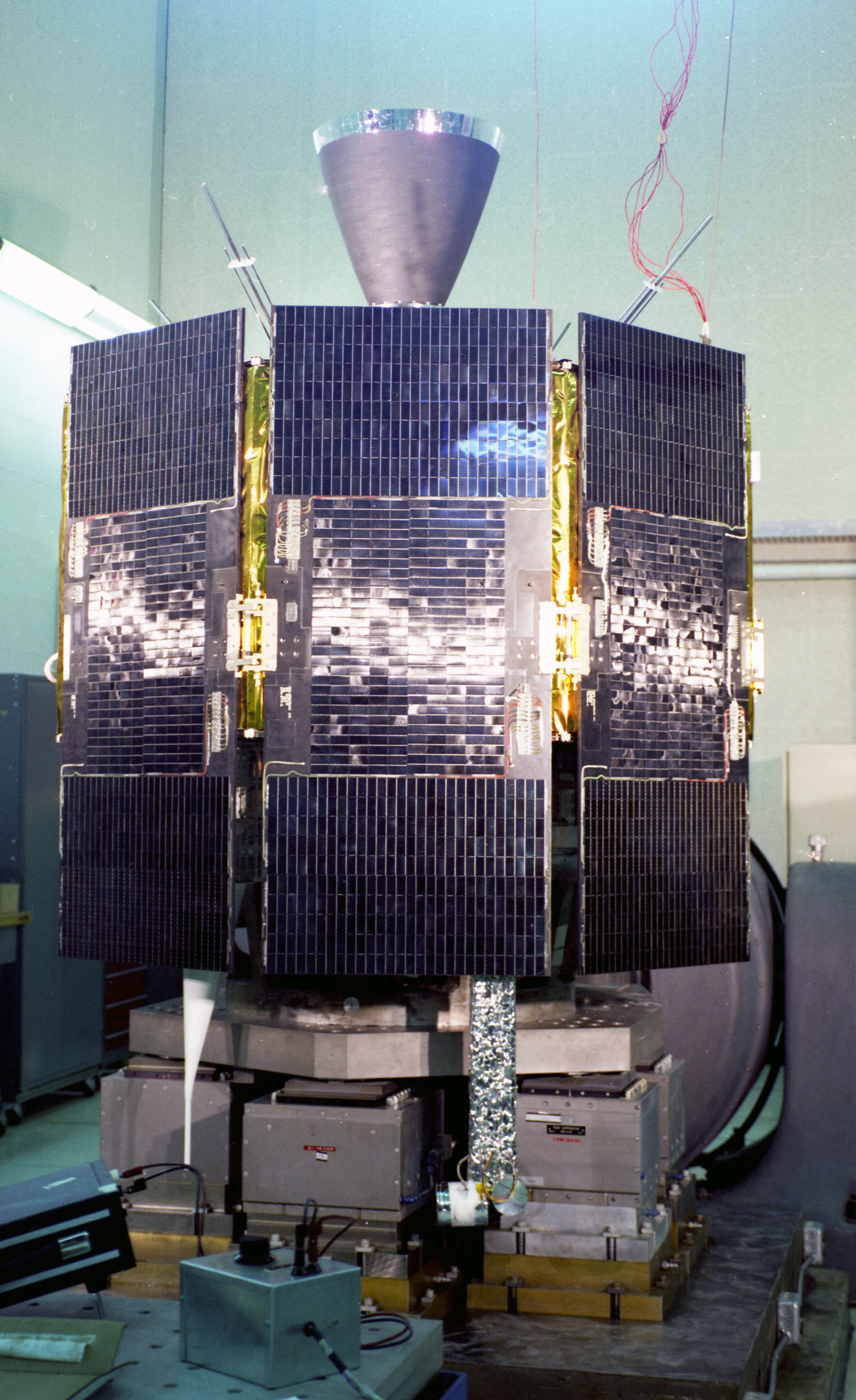
Navigation Technology Satellite 2 (Timation 4)

Two more advanced Timation satellites are launched. NTS-1 - Navigation Technology Satellite (Timation 3) is launched in 1974, while NTS-2 (Timation 4) is launched in 1977.

The results of this program and Air Force Project 621B formed the basis for the Global Positioning System (GPS). The Navy's contribution to the GPS program continued to be focused on ever more accurate clocks.

== History ==
There is a historical connection between accurate time keeping, navigation, and the Navy. In 1714, the British government passed the Longitude Act (see longitude prize) to create an incentive to solve the problem of navigation at sea. The solution, developed by John Harrison, was an accurate clock which could compare local time to Greenwich, England time. To this day, Coordinated Universal Time (UTC), the successor of Greenwich Mean Time (GMT), is the reference time for the planet, and in the United States, the official time for the Department of Defense (DoD) is kept by the United States Navy at the U.S. Naval Observatory in Washington, D.C. This is kept in synchronization with the official civilian time reference maintained by National Institute of Standards and Technology (NIST) and contributes to the International Atomic Time.

== Satellites ==
Satellite	Launch	Launch Pad	Launcher	NSSDC ID	
Timation 1	31 May 1967	SLC 2W	Thor-DM21 Agena-D	1967-053E	with Poppy 5A, 5B, 5C, 5D; Calsphere 3, 4; NRL-PL 150B and OPS 5712
Timation 2	30 September 1969	SLC 1W	Thorad-SLV2G Agena-D	1969-082B	with Poppy 6A, 6B, 6C, 6D; Tempsat 2; SOICAL Cone, Cylinder; Weston; NRL-PL 176
NTS-1 (Timation 3)	14 July 1974	SLC 3W	Atlas F PTS	1974-054A	
NTS-2 (Timation 4)	23 June 1977	SLC 3W	Atlas F SGS-1	1977-053A	

== See also ==
- Time signal
- Navigation Technology Satellite
- Global Positioning System (GPS)
