= Mark 63 Gun Fire Control System =

Gun Fire Control System of the United States Navy

AN/SPG-34
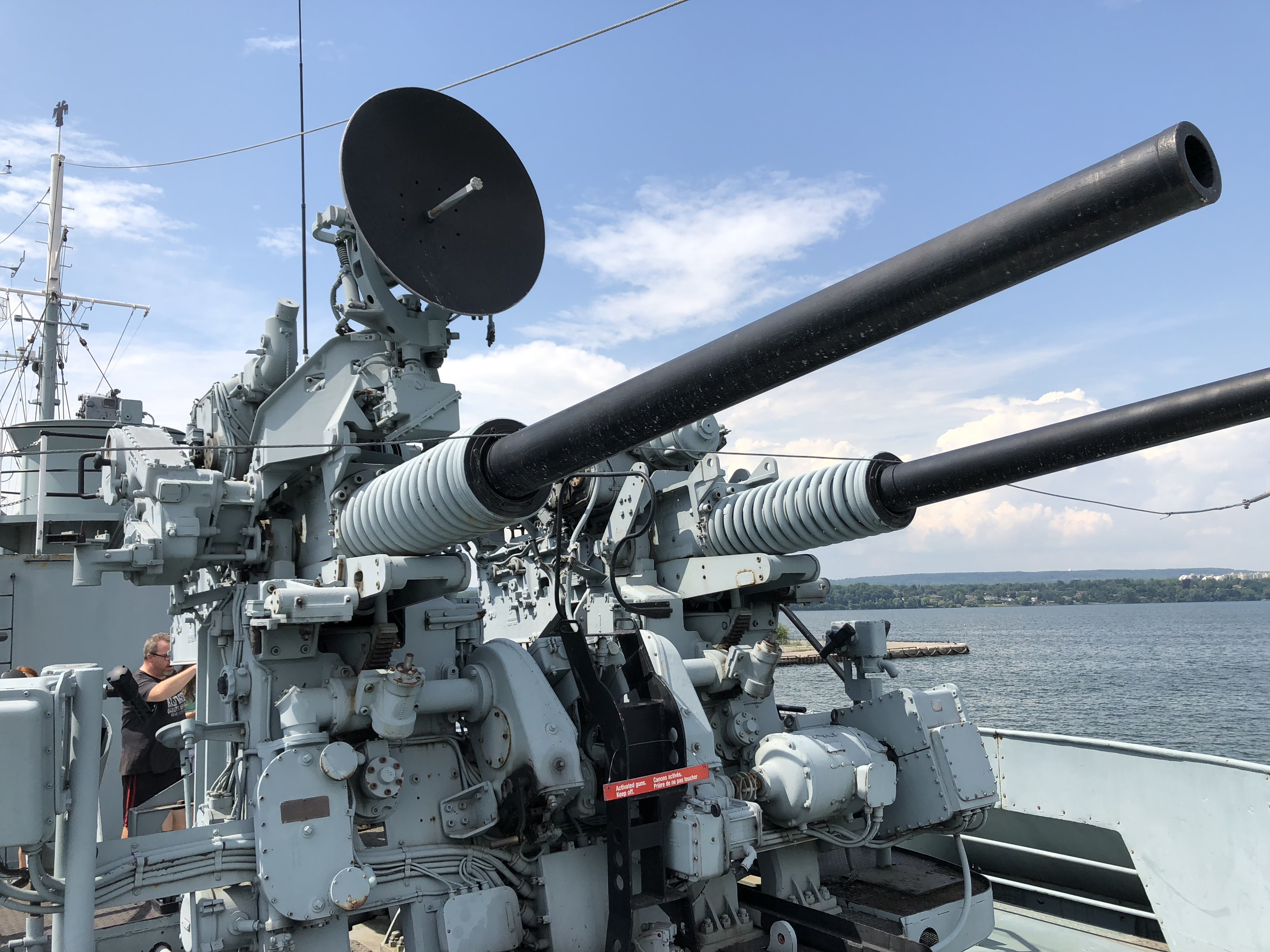
- AN/SPG-34 aboard HMCS Haida
- Country of origin: United States
- Manufacturer: Northrop Grumman/Westinghouse
- Introduced: 1953
- Type: Radar tracker
- Frequency: X band
- PRF: 1,800/180 pps
- Beamwidth: 2.4
- Pulsewidth: 0.3 μs
- Range: 23 km (12.42 nmi)
- Precision: 14 m (15 yd)
- Power: 25-50 kW

Mark 63 Gun Fire Control System (Mk.63 GFCS) is a gun fire-control system made up of AN/SPG-34 radar tracker and the Mark 29 gun sight. They were usually equipped for the control of twin QF 4-inch naval gun Mk XVI and Mk.33 twin 3"/50 cal guns.

== Overview ==
Conventionally, the US Navy has used Mark 51 GFCS on their gun of medium caliber guns and cannons, but it was based on visual aiming and tracking by human, and it does not have anti-aircraft range measuring means, etc. It was rather limited. For this reason, Mark 63 was developed as a new generation GFCS with a particular focus on attack countermeasures.

=== Mark 29 Gun Sight ===
During development, the Navy Weapons Agency aimed to achieve blind shooting and high-precision interception capabilities for targets that take evasive action within 4,000 yards (3,700 m). Similar to the late model of Mk.51, it is a human-operated GFCS centered on the disturbed-line-of-sight systems Mk.15 (later improved Mk.29) gun sight. Equipped with a radar, the radar spot appears within the field of view of the Mk.29, so blind shooting was also possible. Initially, S-band Mk.28 and later X-band Mk.34 were used as radars, and they were installed on turrets and mounts, but the beam width was too narrow and it was difficult to capture targets. By moving the antenna up and down 20 degrees to make it easier to capture the target by swinging the beam (notting mechanism), measures were taken.

The first test was conducted in June 1944, and the deployment started with the installation on an aircraft carrier in November of the same year, and it was put into actual battle in the Battle of Okinawa.

=== AN/SPG-34 Radar Tracker ===
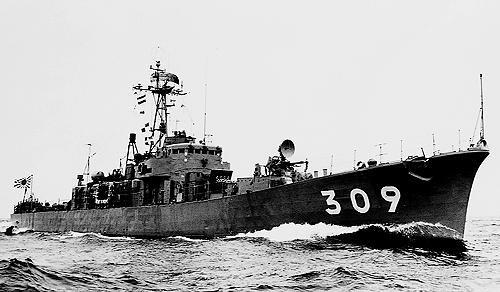
Mk.63 aboard JDS Umitaka

In 1953, the formal name was changed from Mk.34 to AN/SPG-34 based on the naming convention for military electronic devices after completing certain improvements such as increasing the antenna diameter and increasing radar transmission output. In AN/SPG-34, the knotting mechanism was removed due to the improved target acquisition capability, and instead, like AN/SPG-35 in Mk.56 GFCS, conical scanning that quickly measures and distances with a narrow beam width. It was supposed to track the target by (conical scan). In 1956, AN/SPG-34 was modified by using a slightly higher frequency (8,600–9,600 MHz), narrowing the pulse width (0.25 microseconds), and increasing the pulse repetition frequency (2,000/200 pps).

On the other hand, Mk.57 was also developed as a direct-view system that uses the AN/SPG-34 radar and eliminates the complicated optical system due to the perspective type of Mk.63. This was because the computer Mk.17 on the directional board detects the angular velocity etc. with the built-in gyroscope by looking directly at the aiming telescope of the directional board or manually tracking the target on the radar scope, and the computer placed inside the ship. The shooting specifications were calculated by .16. However, unlike Mk.63, the fire-control radar was installed on the directional board rather than on the gun side. Of AN/SPG-34, Mk.63 adopted mod.1 and mod.2 while Mk.57 adopted mod.3 and mod.4.

Later, based on the Mk.63, the Mk.70 was also developed as a derivative of the Ku-band AN/SPG-52 range-finding radar.

== On board ships ==
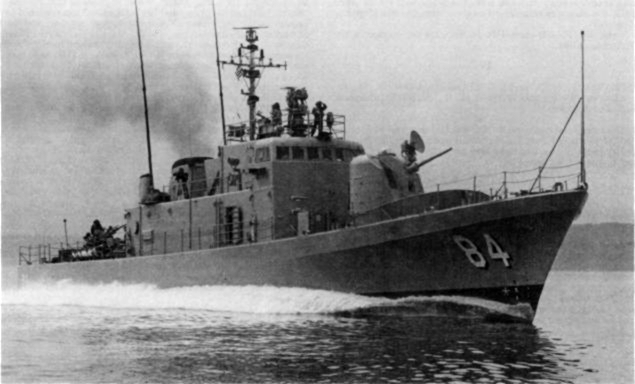
Mark 63 aboard USS Asheville

=== United States Navy ===
- Worcester-class cruiser
- Cannon-class destroyer escort
- Dealey-class destroyer escort
- Asheville-class gunboat

=== (Japan) Maritime Self-Defense Force ===
- Ayanami-class destroyer
- Akizuki-class destroyer
- Harukaze-class destroyer
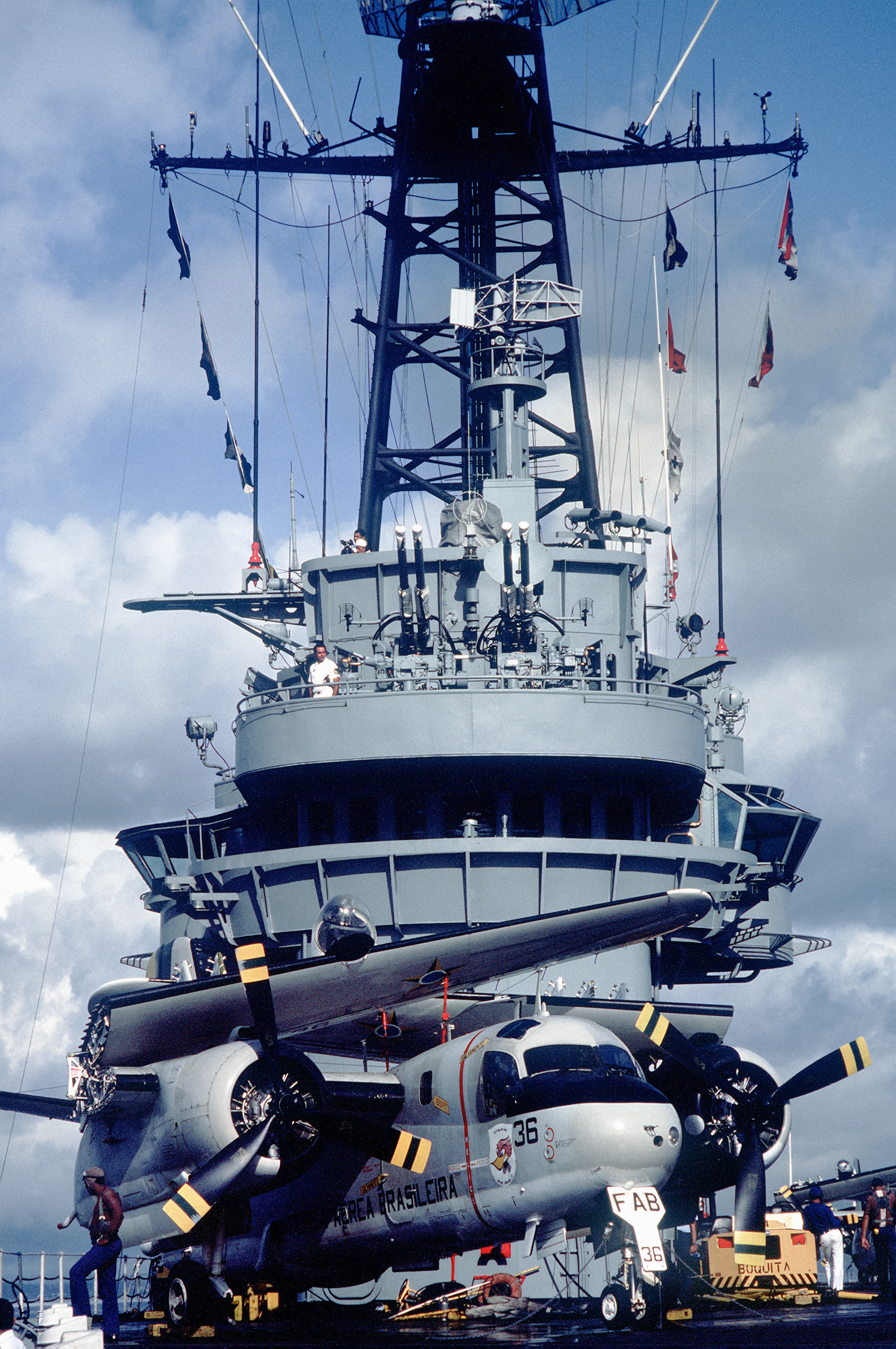
  AN/SPG-34 aboard Minas Gerais
- Murasame-class destroyer
- Yamagumo-class destroyer
- JDS Amatsukaze (DDG-163)
- JDS Akebono (DE-201)
- JDS Wakaba
- Isuzu-class destroyer escort
- Kamome-class submarine chaser
- Kari-class submarine chaser
- Mizutori-class submarine chaser
- Umitaka-class submarine chaser

=== (Canada) Royal Canadian Navy ===
AN/SPG-34 were equipped on board Batch 1 and 2 Tribal-class destroyers, HMCS Algonquin (R17) and HMCS Crescent (DDE-226). A surviving example of this is equipped on HMCS Haida (G63).

- Tribal-class destroyer (1936)
- HMCS Algonquin (R17)
- HMCS Crescent (DDE-226)

==== Portugal ====
- Admiral Pereira da Silva-class frigate

== See also ==
- List of radars
- Radar configurations and types
- Fire-control radar
