= Mark 56 Gun Fire Control System =

Gun Fire Control System of the United States Navy

AN/SPG-35
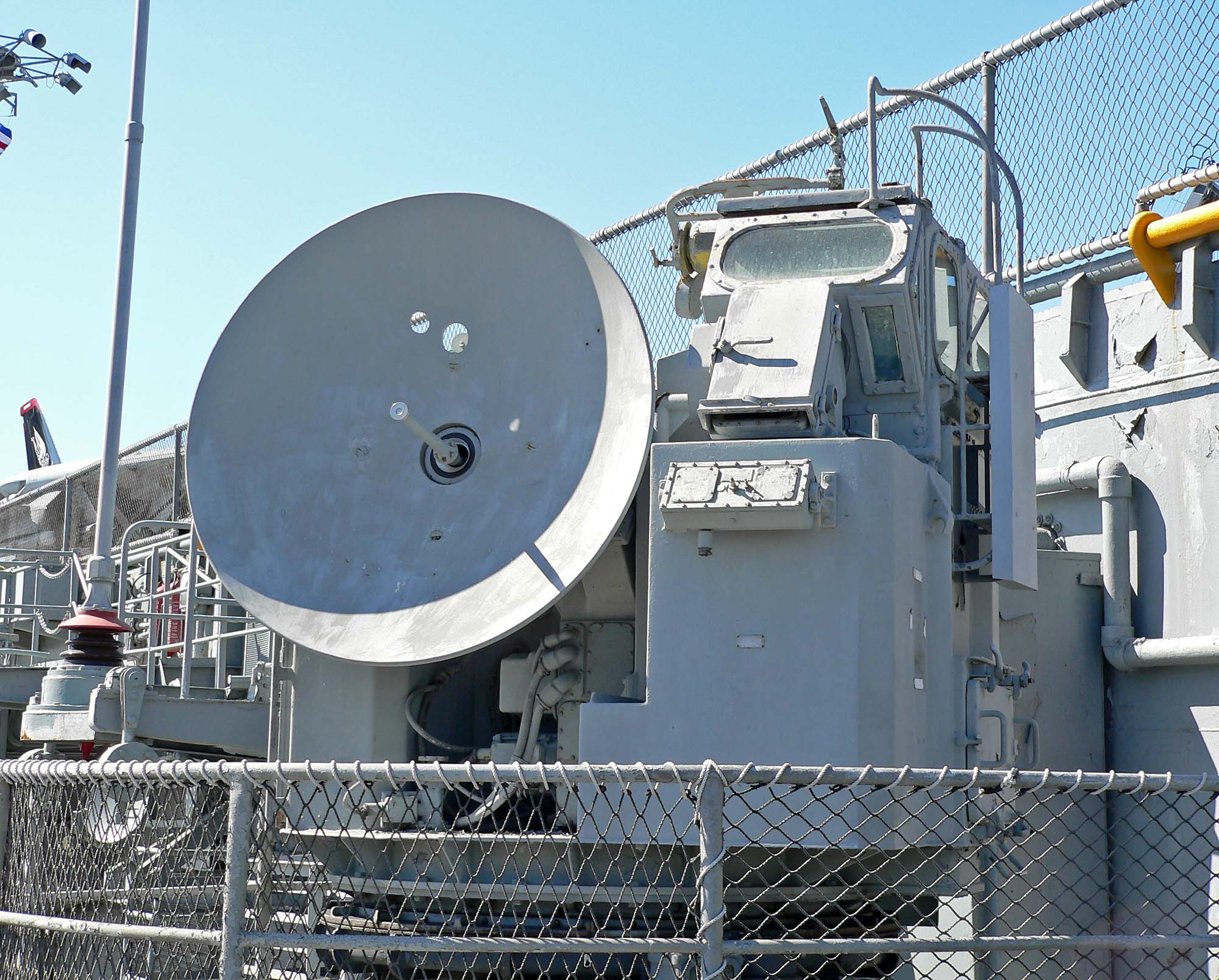
- AN/SPG-35 aboard USS Hornet
- Country of origin: United States
- Designer: MIT Radiation Laboratory
- Introduced: 1950s
- Type: Radar tracker
- Frequency: X band
- PRF: 3,000 pps
- Beamwidth: 2
- Pulsewidth: 0.1-0.15 μs
- Range: 27 km (14.6 nmi)
- Precision: 9 m (10 yd)
- Power: 50 kW

Mark 56 Gun Fire Control System (Mk.56 GFCS) is a gun fire-control system made up of AN/SPG-35 radar tracker and the Mark 42 ballistic computer.

== Overview ==
The directional board is maneuverable, equipped with an X-band radar Mk.35 (later renamed AN/SPG-35 based on the naming convention for military electronic equipment) and an optical sight, and is controlled by two operators on board. Target tracking by the operator's optical sight is also possible, but fully automated tracking is the basic operation, and blindfire is also possible for the first time in the US Navy.

=== Mark 42 Ballistic Computer ===
First, the target is captured by a spiral scan that slowly scans the space by swinging the beam at an angle of 6 degrees, and then a conical scan that quickly measures and distances by narrowing the beam swing angle to 0.5 degrees. Track the target by scanning. The speed of the tracking target is obtained by the gyroscope of the directional board and the tachometer generator of the distance tracking servo system. Ballistic calculation was performed by the Mk.42 ballistic computer housed in the ship, and it was possible to aim two types of guns at the same target by adding a ballistic calculation housing. During the war, there were many cases where radar tracking could not catch up with the attacking aircraft incoming at high speed.

=== AN/SPG-35 Radar Tracker ===
The first model of this model was delivered in August 1945, and has been in operation since the 1950s. Performance improvements continued after the war, and it became possible to start shooting in 2 seconds from the start of tracking for subsonic aircraft. Mk.68 GFCS was the standard for the Mark 42 5"/54 cal gun, but this machine was also used as a secondary directional board. Well known electric engineer Ivan A. Getting was involved in the creation of AN/SPG-35.

The Japan Maritime Self-Defense Force requested the equipment of this model with the Harukaze-class destroyer, which was the first domestic escort ship after the war, but it was not approved by the US side, and the actual equipment was in the Second Defense Build-up Plan.

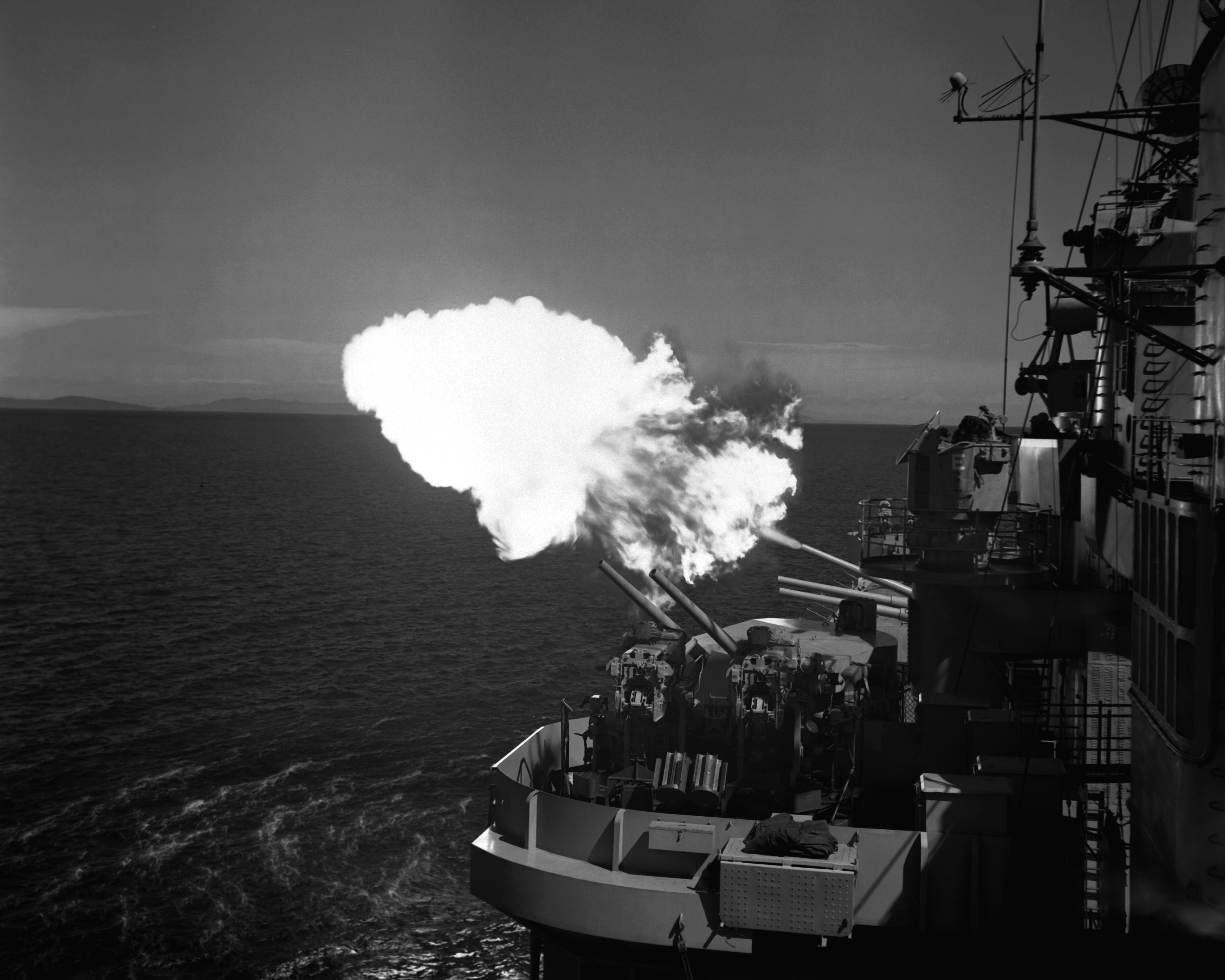
AN/SPG-35 aboard USS Saint Paul

=== On board ships ===
==== United States Navy ====
- Midway-class aircraft carrier
- Essex-class aircraft carrier
- USS New Jersey (BB-62)
- Des Moines-class cruiser
- Worcester-class cruiser
- Juneau-class cruiser
- Boston-class cruiser
- Baltimore-class cruiser
- Forrest Sherman-class destroyer
- USS Norfolk (DL-1)
- Bronstein-class frigate
- Brooke-class frigate
- Garcia-class frigate
- Hamilton-class cutter
- Kilauea-class ammunition ship
- Mars-class combat stores ship
- Sacramento-class fast combat support ship

==== (Japan) Maritime Self-Defense Force ====
- Yamagumo-class destroyer
- Minegumo-class destroyer
- Takatsuki-class destroyer

== MRS-3 ==
In the United Kingdom, the MRS-3 (Medium Range System) was developed based on this model. The Type 903 radar tracker was commissioned in 1946 and 1958. The Type 904 radar tracker was also developed as a derivative of the GWS.22 Seacat air defense missile system.

In addition, the Mk.64 GUNAR, which changed the shooting command radar to the gun side equipment (initially the same AN/SPG-34 as the Mk.63, later AN/SPG-48), was also developed, and this was mainly used by the Royal Canadian Navy. This later evolved into the Mk.69, which was independently digitized and refurbished by Canada and changed its radar to SPG-515.

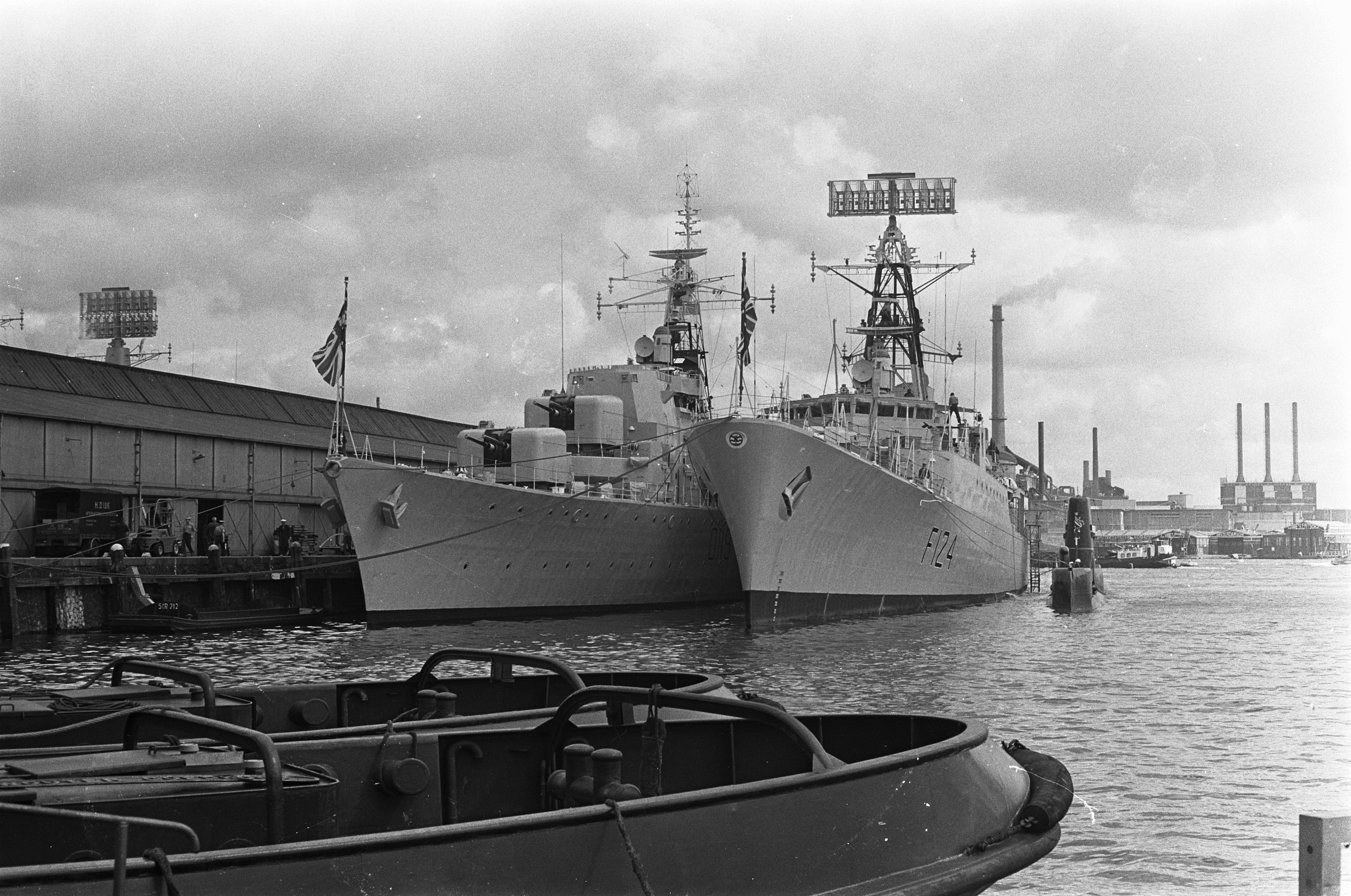
MRS-3 aboard HMS Zulu and HMS Delight

=== (United Kingdom) Royal Navy ===
- HMS Hermes (R12)
- Tiger-class cruiser
- Daring-class destroyer
- County-class destroyer
- Rothesay-class frigate
- Leander-class frigate
- Rothesay-class frigate
- Tribal-class frigate

=== (India) Indian Navy ===
- Nilgiri-class frigate

=== (Peru) Peruvian Navy ===
- Palacios-class destroyer

== See also ==
- List of radars
- Radar configurations and types
- Fire-control radar
