= Mizutori-class submarine chaser =

Class of Japan Maritime Self Defense Force submarine chasers

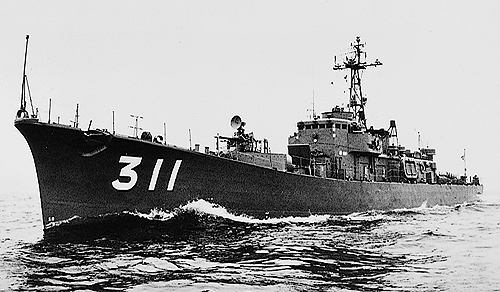
- JDS Mizutori

Class overview
- Name: Mizutori class
- Builders: Kawasaki Heavy Industries; IHI Corporation; Fujinagata Shipyards; Sasebo Ship Industry; Sasebo Heavy Industries
- Operators: Japan Maritime Self-Defense Force
- Preceded by: Umitaka class
- Built: 1959–1965
- In commission: 1960–1999
- Planned: 8
- Completed: 8
- Retired: 8

General characteristics
- Type: Submarine chaser
- Displacement: standard: 420 t (410 long tons) (PC-311-315); 430 t (420 long tons) (PC-316); 440 t (430 long tons) (PC-319, 320); full load: 480 t (470 long tons) (PC-311-315); 485 t (477 long tons) (PC-316); 490 t (480 long tons) (PC-319, 320)
- Length: 60.5 m (198 ft 6 in)
- Beam: 7.1 m (23 ft 4 in)
- Draft: 2.3 m (7 ft 7 in)
- Depth: 4.4 m (14 ft 5 in)
- Propulsion: 2 × Kawasaki MAN V8 V22 / 30 diesel electric engines; 2 × shafts
- Speed: 20 kn (37 km/h; 23 mph)
- Complement: 80
- Sensors & processing systems: OPS-16 air-search radar; AN/SQS-11A sonar; Mark 63 fire-control system
- Electronic warfare & decoys: NOLR-1
- Armament: 1 × twin Bofors 40 mm gun; 1 × hedgehog anti-submarine mortar; 1 × Type 54 depth charge rack; 2 × Mark 2 single torpedo tube (PC-311-315); 2 × Type 68 triple torpedo tube (PC-316-320)

The Mizutori-class submarine chaser was a class of submarine chasers of the Japan Maritime Self-Defense Force after the Second World War, in the early 1960s.

== Design ==
In this type, the navigation performance was improved and the design was rationalized based on the operational results of the preceding 1954 planned boats (Kari-class, Kamome-class). The basic design was carried out by the Ship Design Association for boats in 1954, but it was transferred from this model to the Technical Research Institute of the Defense Agency (at that time), and the plan number was K103A.

They were designed to be larger (1.4 times the standard displacement) based on the FY1954 plan, and the ship type was the same flush deck type. In the 1954 classes, the elaborate design with extremely thin plates led to an increase in man-hours, so the bow was 2.9 to 3.2 mm thick, but now it is 4.5 to 6 mm, and the area below the waterline is also 4.5 to 8 mm. Although it was thickened to millimeters, it still had a thin plate structure as a whole. In addition, in the 1954 classes, the bridge and the deck room were separated to reduce the area on the wind pressure side, but there were drawbacks such as the inconvenience of communication inside the ship in stormy weather and the inability to secure sufficient space inside the ship. Therefore, in this model, the front and rear superstructures are integrated so that it can be easily moved back and forth even in stormy weather.

In addition to the wing on the bridge, they were equipped with the flagship equipment, so the superstructure is extended 2.5 meters to the rear to provide the headquarters general affairs room. In addition, since the 1934 boat, corrugated panels have been adopted on the side walls of the superstructure to reduce man-hours and weight.

On the other hand, as the main engine, the Umitaka-class was equipped with the same medium-speed robust diesel main engine manufactured by Mitsui Zosen as well as the Kamome-class, while this type has a relatively lightweight high-speed diesel main engine with almost the same configuration as the scale type. It was equipped with a V8 V22 / 30 type 4-cycle single-acting V-type 16-cylinder exhaust turbocharged diesel engine produced by Kawasaki Heavy Industries under a license agreement with MAN. It did not have a self-reversing mechanism and was connected to the propeller via a fluid coupling and a reducer.

== Equipment ==
As a sonar, the 25.5 kHz class scanning AN/SQS-11A was installed on the bottom of the twin Bofors 40 mm gun, just like the 1954 classes. On the other hand, as a radar, the 1954 boats were equipped with AN/SPS-5B, which was made in the United States and used the X band, while this model was made in Japan and used the C band, OPS-16.

The high-angle machine gun system was similar to that of the 1954 boats, and was equipped with a Mk.1 40mm twin machine gun on the front deck. It was commanded by the Mk.63 Fire Control System (GFCS), with the director on the bridge top and the fire radar on the gun side. In addition, the hedgehog Mk.10 anti-submarine mortar is placed just before the bridge structure behind it, and a 54-type depth charge drop rail (6 depth charges for 1 line) is placed on each side of the stern. Is. However, in the 1954 boats, an anti-submarine short torpedo equipped with a guidance device was adopted instead of the 55-type depth charge projector (so-called Y gun) placed on the rear deck. The four early-built boats used short torpedo projectors that project 483 mm diameter Mk.32 short torpedoes, while the four late-built boats were made in the United States and 324. It was changed to a 68-type triple short torpedo launcher that produced a licensed Mk.32 with a millimeter diameter. This became standard equipment on the subsequent Maritime Self-Defense Force guard ships, but this class and Umitaka-class submarine chaser were the first equipped boats.

== Ships of class ==
Mizutori-class repair submarine chaser
| Pennant number | Name | Builders | Laid down | Launched | Commissioned | Redesignated | Decommissioned |
|---|---|---|---|---|---|---|---|
| PC-311 / ASU-89 | Mizutori | Kawasaki Heavy Industries | 13 March 1959 | 22 September 1959 | 27 February 1960 | 27 March 1981 | 27 March 1985 |
| PC-312 / ASU-90 | Yamadori | Fujinagata Shipyards | 14 March 1959 | 22 October 1959 | 15 March 1960 | 27 March 1981 | 27 March 1985 |
| PC-313 / ASU-61 | Otori | IHI Corporation | 16 December 1959 | 27 May 1960 | 13 October 1960 | 27 March 1982 | 31 October 1985 |
| PC-314 / ASU-87 | Kasasagi | Fujinagata Shipyards | 18 December 1959 | 31 May 1960 | 31 October 1960 | 5 March 1981 | 27 March 1985 |
| PC-315 / ASU-62 | Hatsukari | Sasebo Ship Industry | 22 January 1960 | 24 June 1960 | 15 November 1960 | 27 March 1982 | 31 October 1985 |
| PC-316 / ASU-63 | Umidori | Sasebo Heavy Industries | 15 February 1962 | 15 October 1952 | 30 March 1963 | 30 March 1964 | 24 March 1987 |
| PC-319 / ASU-66 | Shiratori | Sasebo Heavy Industries | 29 February 1964 | 8 October 1964 | 26 February 1965 | 19 March 1986 | 24 March 1987 |
| PC-320 / ASY-92 | Hiyodori | Sasebo Heavy Industries | 26 February 1965 | 25 September 1965 | 28 February 1966 | 21 May 1987 | 6 July 1999 |
