= Umitaka-class submarine chaser =

Class of Japan Maritime Self Defense Force submarine chasers

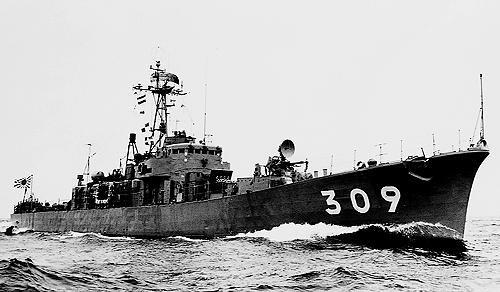
- JDS Umitaka

Class overview
- Name: Umitaka class
- Builders: Kawasaki Heavy Industries; IHI Corporation; Fujinagata Shipyards
- Operators: Japan Maritime Self-Defense Force
- Preceded by: Hayabusa class
- Succeeded by: Mizutori class
- Built: 1959–1963
- In commission: 1959–1989
- Planned: 4
- Completed: 4
- Retired: 4

General characteristics
- Type: Submarine chaser
- Displacement: standard: 440 t (430 long tons) (PC-309, 310); 460 t (450 long tons) (PC-317, 318); full load: 500 t (490 long tons) (PC-309, 310); 520 t (510 long tons) (PC-317, 318)
- Length: 60.5 m (198 ft 6 in)
- Beam: 7.1 m (23 ft 4 in)
- Draft: 2.3 m (7 ft 7 in)
- Depth: 4.4 m (14 ft 5 in)
- Propulsion: 2 × Mitsui B & W 635VBU-45 diesel electric engines; 2 × shafts
- Speed: 20 kn (37 km/h; 23 mph)
- Complement: 80
- Sensors & processing systems: OPS-16 air-search radar; AN/SQS-11A sonar; Mark 63 fire-control system
- Electronic warfare & decoys: OLR-4B (PC-309, 310); NOLR-1 (PC-317, 318)
- Armament: 1 × twin Bofors 40 mm gun; 1 × hedgehog anti-submarine mortar; 1 × Type 54 depth charge rack; 2 × Mark 2 single torpedo tube (PC-309, 310); 2 × Type 68 triple torpedo tube (PC-317, 318)

The Umitaka-class submarine chaser was a class of submarine chasers of the Japan Maritime Self-Defense Force after the Second World War, in the late 1950s.

== Design ==
In this type, the navigation performance was improved and the design was rationalized based on the operational results of the preceding 1954 planned boats (Kari-class, Kamome-class). The basic design was carried out by the Ship Design Association for boats in 1954, but it was transferred from this model to the Technical Research Institute of the Defense Agency (at that time), and the plan number was K103B.

They were designed to be larger (1.4 times the standard displacement) based on the FY1954 plan, and the ship type was the same flush deck type. In the 1954 classes, the elaborate design with extremely thin plates led to an increase in man-hours, so the bow was 2.9 to 3.2 mm thick, but now it is 4.5 to 6 mm, and the area below the waterline is also 4.5 to 8 mm. Although it was thickened to millimeters, it still had a thin plate structure as a whole. In addition, in the 1954 classes, the bridge and the deck room were separated to reduce the area on the wind pressure side, but there were drawbacks such as the inconvenience of communication inside the ship in stormy weather and the inability to secure sufficient space inside the ship. Therefore, in this model, the front and rear superstructures are integrated so that it can be easily moved back and forth even in stormy weather.

Air conditioning has been introduced in some areas such as battle areas and officer's rooms, and the living quarters have been expanded (10% increase in area per person), improving livability. However, due to these factors, the center of gravity rose and the stability deteriorated, and Umitaka and Otaka were equipped with about 15 tons of fixed ballast. In addition, for the following boats, measures to lower the center of gravity were taken in sequence by reexamining including the equipment, such as changing the thickness of the upper deck (from 6 mm to 5 mm).

In addition to the wing on the bridge, only the final ship, Kumataka was equipped with the flagship equipment, so the superstructure is extended 2.5 meters to the rear to provide the headquarters general affairs room. In addition, since the 1934 boat, corrugated panels have been adopted on the side walls of the superstructure to reduce man-hours and weight.

As the main engine, a relatively heavy medium-speed robust diesel engine with almost the same configuration as the Kamome-class has adopted, and the 635VBU-45 type 2 manufactured by Mitsui Zosen under a license agreement with B & W in Denmark. It was equipped with a trunk-piston diesel engine with a cycle single-acting in-line 6-cylinder exhaust turbocharger. This was developed as a sister engine with half the cylinder output of the 950VBU60 type (output 6,000 horsepower) of the Ikazuchi class' Inazuma built in the previous year's plan. It is equipped with a self-reversing mechanism and is directly connected to the propulsion device. The fuel used was No. 1 A heavy oil for ordinary diesel engines.

== Equipment ==
As a sonar, the 25.5 kHz class scanning AN/SQS-11A was installed on the bottom of the twin Bofors 40 mm gun, just like the 1954 classes. On the other hand, as a radar, the 1954 boats were equipped with AN/SPS-5B, which was made in the United States and used the X band, while this model was made in Japan and used the C band, OPS-16. In addition, since this model, a radio wave detector (ESM) for electronic warfare support has been installed, and the first two ships (Umitaka and Otaka) built in the 1957 plan was installed directly at the rear end of the superstructure, while it was installed on the pillars of the last two ships.

The high-angle machine gun system was similar to that of the 1954 boats, and was equipped with a Mk.1 40mm twin machine gun on the front deck. It was commanded by the Mk.63 Fire Control System (GFCS), with the director on the bridge top and the fire radar on the gun side. In addition, the hedgehog Mk.10 anti-submarine mortar is placed just before the bridge structure behind it, and a 54-type depth charge drop rail (6 depth charges for 1 line) is placed on each side of the stern. Is. However, in the 1954 boats, an anti-submarine short torpedo equipped with a guidance device was adopted instead of the 55-type depth charge projector (so-called Y gun) placed on the rear deck. The two early-built boats used short torpedo projectors that project 483 mm diameter Mk.32 short torpedoes, while the two late-built boats (Wakataka and Kumataka) were made in the United States and 324. It was changed to a 68-type triple short torpedo launcher that produced a licensed Mk.32 with a millimeter diameter. This became standard equipment on the subsequent Maritime Self-Defense Force guard ships, but this class and Mizutori-class submarine chaser were the first equipped boats.

== Ships of class ==
Umitaka-class repair submarine chaser
Pennant number	Name	Builders	Laid down	Launched	Commissioned	Redesignated	Decommissioned
PC-309 / ASU-86	Umitaka	Kawasaki Heavy Industries	13 May 1959	25 July 1959	30 November 1959	17 March 1980	10 March 1984
PC-310 / ASU-88	Otaka	Kure Naval Arsenal	18 March 1959	3 September 1959	14 January 1960	27 March 1981	5 March 1985
PC-317 / ASU-64	Wakataka	Kure Naval Arsenal	5 March 1962	13 November 1962	30 March 1963	27 March 1985	17 March 1988
PC-318 / ASU-65	Kumataka	Fujinagata Shipyards	20 March 1963	20 October 1963	25 March 1964	27 March 1985	27 March 1989
