= Navigation Technology Satellite =

Experimental US satellites

The Navigation Technology Satellites are satellite demonstrations of new technologies related to satellite navigation, especially for next-generation GPS satellites.

== List of satellites ==
| Name | SATCAT | Launch date (UTC) | Launch vehicle | Launch site | Orbital apsis | Inclination | Period (min) | Status |
|---|---|---|---|---|---|---|---|---|
| NTS-1 (Timation 3) | 7369 | 14 July 1974 | Atlas-F/PTS | Vandenberg, SLC-3W | | | | Success |
| NTS-2 (Timation 4) | 10091 | 23 June 1977 | Atlas-F/SGS-1 | Vandenberg, SLC-3W | | | | Success |
| NTS-3 | 65160 | 13 August 2025; 00:56 UTC | Vulcan Centaur VC4S | Cape Canaveral, SLC-41 | | | | Success |

=== Navigation Technology Satellite-1 (NTS-1) ===
Navigation Technology Satellite-1 (NTS-1), also known as Timation-3 or P73-3, was a US Navy satellite launched on July 14, 1974, from Vandenberg Air Force Base, California, using an Atlas F/PTS rocket. It was a pivotal part of the TIMATION program, a precursor to the modern Global Positioning System (GPS), aimed at testing technologies for precise time-based navigation.

=== Navigation Technology Satellite-2 (NTS-2) ===
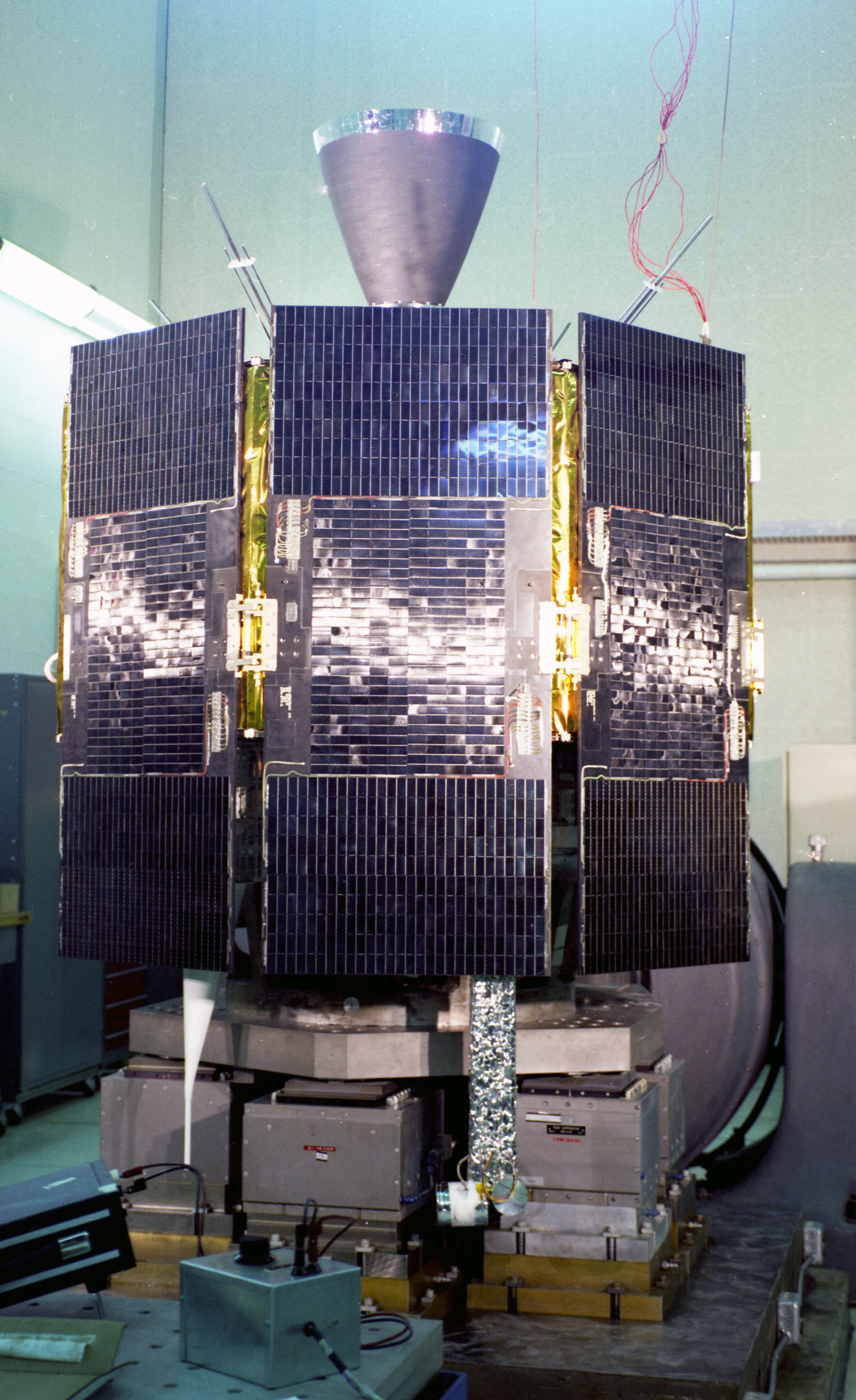
NTS-2 before launch

Navigation Technology Satellite-2 (NTS-2), also known as Timation-4 or P76-4, was a US Navy technology-demonstration satellite launched on June 23, 1977, from Vandenberg Air Force Base, California, using an Atlas F/SGS-1 rocket. It was the second satellite in the Navigation Technology Satellite series, marking a critical step in the development of the modern Global Positioning System.

=== Navigation Technology Satellite-3 (NTS-3) ===
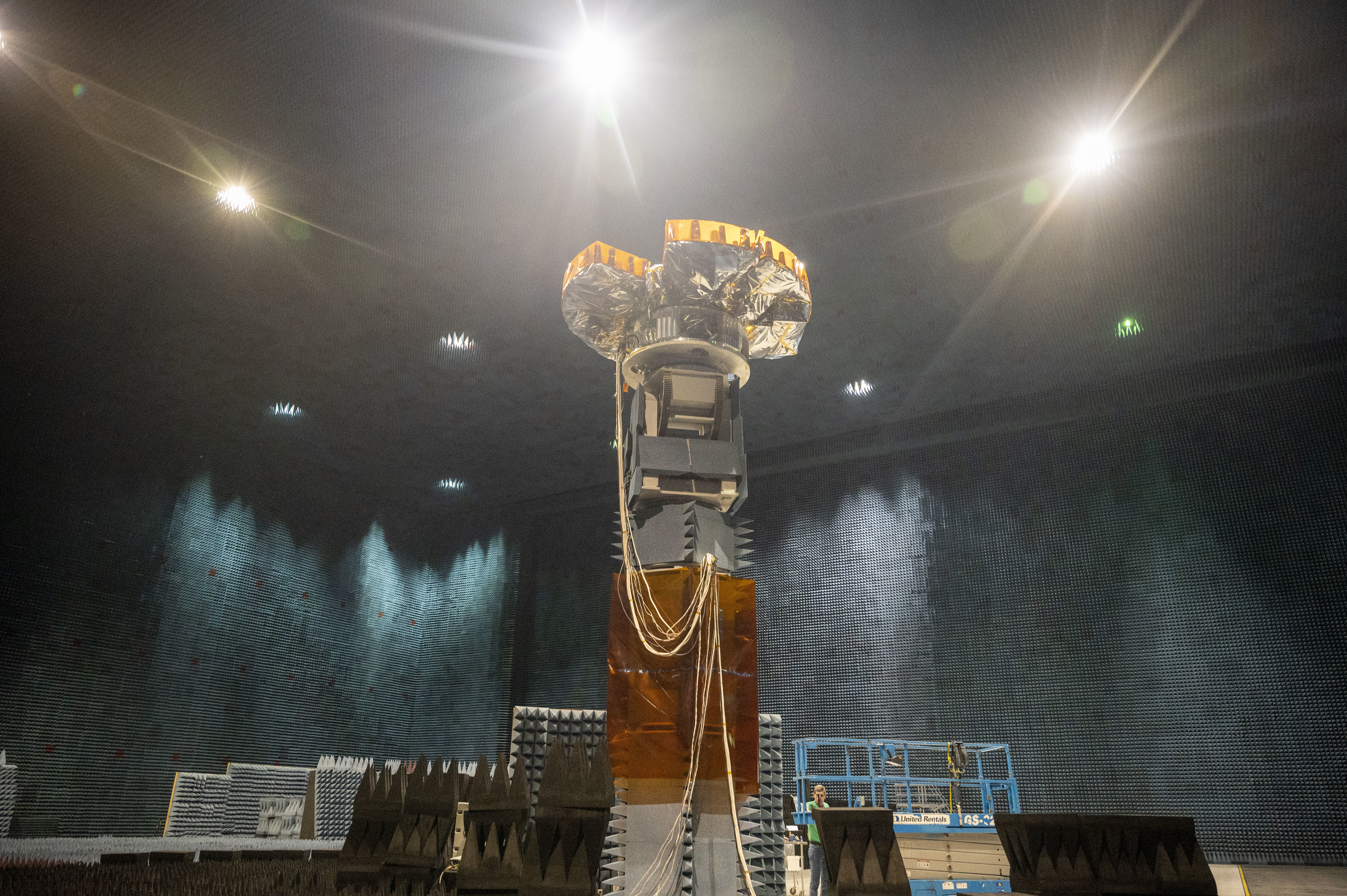
NTS-3 during testing

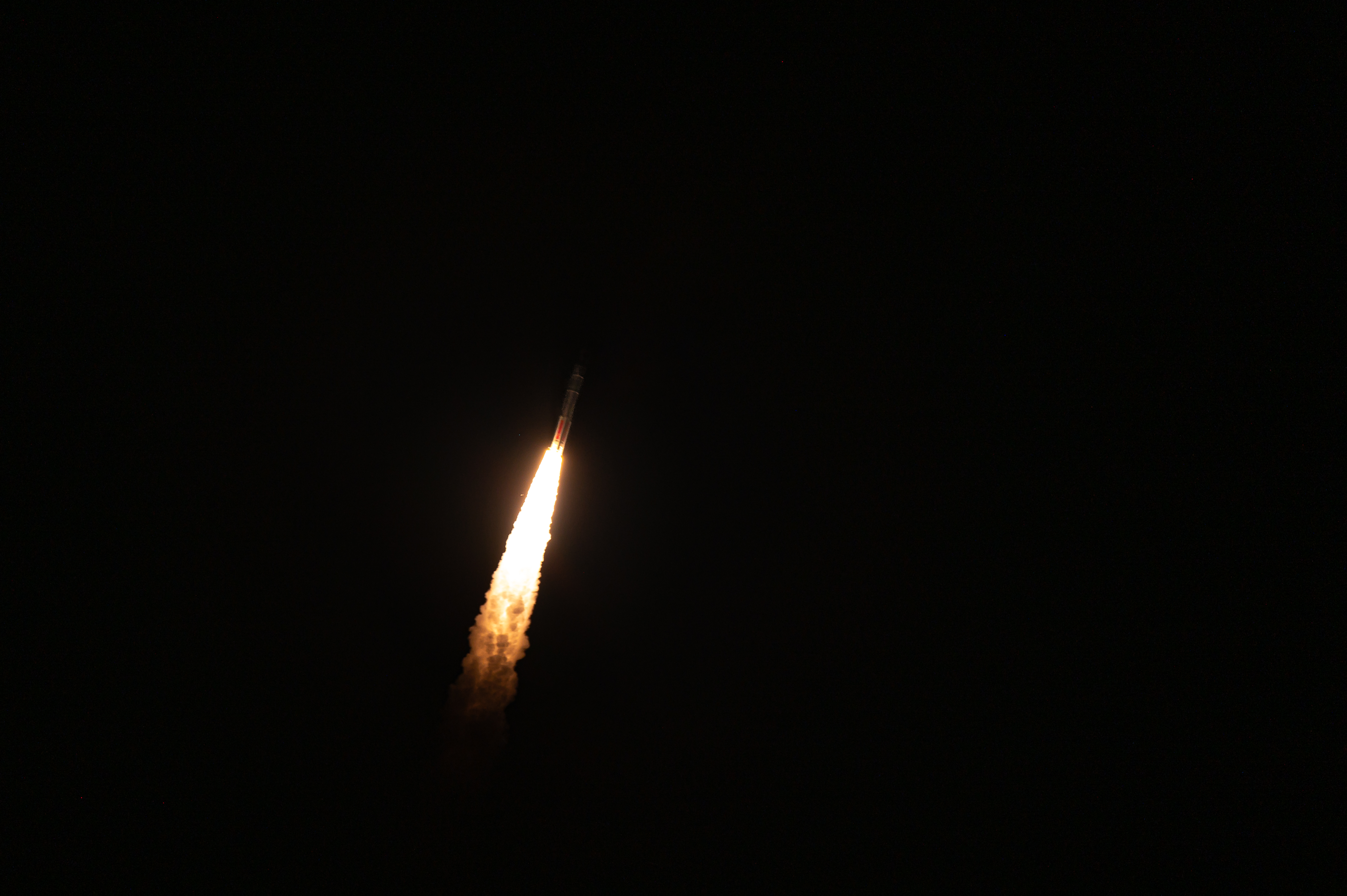
Launch of USSF-106, carrying NTS-3

Navigation Technology Satellite-3 (NTS-3) is a satellite to demonstrate new technologies related to satellite navigation. NTS-3 will demonstrate resilient positioning, navigation, and timing in a multi-layer space architecture.

NTS-3 is based on the Northrop Grumman ESPAStar-D satellite bus. The satellite was launched on a Vulcan Centaur VC4S rocket as part of USSF-106 mission from SLC-41 at Cape Canaveral on 13 August 2025 at 00:56 UTC.

== See also ==
- Timation
- Global Positioning System
