= Kari-class submarine chaser =

Class of Japan Maritime Self Defense Force submarine chasers

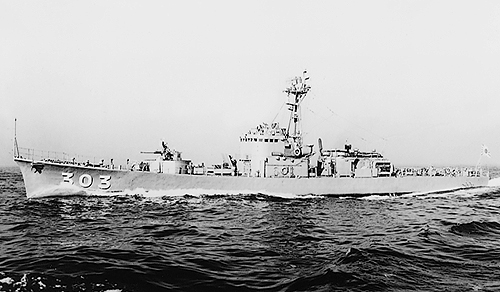
- JDS Taka

Class overview
- Name: Kari class
- Builders: Fujinagata Shipyards; Maizuru Naval Arsenal
- Operators: Japan Maritime Self-Defense Force
- Succeeded by: Kamome class
- Built: 1956-1957
- In commission: 1957-1977
- Planned: 4
- Completed: 4
- Retired: 4

General characteristics
- Type: Submarine chaser
- Displacement: 310 t (310 long tons) standard
- Length: 56 m (183 ft 9 in)
- Beam: 6.5 m (21 ft 4 in)
- Draft: 2.1 m (6 ft 11 in)
- Depth: 4 m (13 ft 1 in)
- Propulsion: 2 × Kawasaki MAN V8 V22 / 30 diesel electric engines; 2 × shafts
- Speed: 20 kn (37 km/h; 23 mph)
- Complement: 70
- Sensors & processing systems: AN/SPS-5B air-search radar; AN/SQS-11A sonar; Mark 63 fire-control system
- Armament: 1 × twin Bofors 40 mm gun; 1 × hedgehog anti-submarine mortar; 2 × Y-gun depth charge thrower; 2 × Type 54 depth charge racks

The Kari-class submarine chaser was a class of submarine chasers of the Japan Maritime Self-Defense Force after the Second World War, in the mid-1950s.

== Development ==
In the 1950s, although there were some new innovations such as the spread of underwater high-speed submarines and the appearance of nuclear-powered submarines, the world's submarines were still in a state of being unable to escape from their appearance during World War II. In addition, new technologies such as anti-submarine missiles (SUM) and patrol helicopters (HS), which will significantly change the aspect of anti-submarine warfare, have just begun to emerge. Therefore, submarine chasers with appropriate anti-submarine search and attack capabilities were considered to be influential in anti-submarine defense in harbors, straits, or nearby seas.

For this reason, when the Ministry of Finance approved the allocation of defense contributions to ship construction costs when formulating the budget for 1954, the National Safety Agency's security forces had eight 300-ton and 60-ton class submarine chasers. Three submarine chasers (torpedo boats) were included. For technical and military comparisons, these eight 300-ton class submarine chasers have three variations depending on the main engine, four are Kawasaki Heavy Industries' high-speed lightweight diesel main engines, and three are made by Mitsui Engineering & Shipbuilding. A medium-speed robust diesel main engine, one of which will be equipped with a high-speed lightweight diesel main engine manufactured by Mitsui Engineering & Shipbuilding and a gas turbine main engine manufactured by Mitsubishi Shipbuilding. Of these, this model was said to be equipped with a high-speed, lightweight diesel main engine manufactured by Kawasaki Heavy Industries. The gas turbine-equipped boat was classified as a 26-knot class high-speed test boat as a B-type submarine chaser, and the other seven boats were classified as a 20-knot class practical boat as an A-type submarine chaser.

== Design ==
The basic design was done by the Ship Design Association, as was the case with the destroyers of the same period, and the plan number was K101A. In designing, as with the other submarine chasers planned for the same year, the Imperial Japanese Navy's CH-4 and No.13-class submarine chasers would be used as the basis for the design, and this would adapt the US Navy's weaponries.

The ship type has a flush deck similar to the CH-4 and No.13-classes, but in order to improve stability, seakeeping and habitability, a strong shear was provided to make the bow larger and toward the stern. The weight was reduced by gradually lowering the freeboard. Aluminium alloy was used for the mast and superstructure to reduce the weight of the upper part. For the hull, SM41W thin steel plate (4.5 mm thick even under the waterline, 2.9 to 3.2 mm thick at the bow, etc.) was used to reduce the weight, and high-strength steel were also introduced in some parts. In addition, the bridge and deck chamber were separated in order to reduce the area on the wind pressure side as the center of gravity descended, and the bridge was moved as close to the center as possible to suppress acceleration due to longitudinal sway. This had drawbacks such as the inability to communicate with the ship in stormy weather and the inability to secure sufficient space inside the ship, so the design was revised for the Mizutori-class and Umitaka-class after the 1957 plan.

As the main engine, a diesel engine with a V8 V22 / 30 type 4-cycle single-acting V-type 16-cylinder exhaust turbocharger produced by Kawasaki Heavy Industries under a license agreement with MAN was installed. It does not have a self-reversing mechanism and is connected to the propeller via a fluid coupling and a reducer. Due to this, the shaft system became longer, and because the main engine room was located in front of the auxiliary equipment room, the funnel was installed on the rear deck room, but it was designed to keep the height low. At first glance, it seemed that there was no funnel.

== Equipment ==
As for the sensor, a sensor of almost the same type as the escort ship of the same period was installed, but the air-search radar was omitted. As a seaplane search radar, the X-band AN/SPS-5B was installed on the mast, and as a sonar, a 25.5 kHz class scanning AN/SQS-11A was installed on the bottom of the ship directly under the Bofors 40 mm gun.

Regarding armament, the US Navy generally follows the PC-461-class submarine chaser that was maintained during World War II, with a twin Mk.1 Bofors 40mm gun on the front deck and a hedgehog launcher just before the bridge structure behind it. A Hog Mk.10 anti-submarine slamming gun was placed, and a 55-type depth charge projector (Y-gun) and two 54-type depth charge rails (6 depth charges for 1 row) were placed on each side of the rear deck. The Mk.1 40mm twin gun was commanded by the Mk.63 fire control system, the director was on the bridge top, and the Mk.34 fire control radar was on the gun side. In addition, the ammunition for hedgehog is 96 shots for 4 simultaneous shots, and 36 depth charges are installed. A warehouse was set up. As part of the measures to lower the center of gravity, the tip of the depth charge drop rail was made embedded.

== Ships of class ==
Kari-class repair submarine chaser
Pennant number	Name	Builders	Laid down	Launched	Commissioned	Decommissioned
PC-301	Kari	Fujinagata Shipyards	18 January 1956	26 September 1956	8 February 1957	15 March 1977
PC-302	Kiji	Maizuru Naval Arsenal	14 December 1955	11 September 1956	29 January 1957	15 March 1977
PC-303	Lino	Fujinagata Shipyards	18 January 1956	17 November 1956	11 March 1957	15 March 1977
PC-304	Taka	Maizuru Naval Arsenal	14 December 1955	12 November 1956	20 March 1957	15 March 1977
