= Sasebo Heavy Industries =

Japanese machinery and shipbuilding company

Coordinates: 33.1620758°N 129.6977459°E

Sasebo Heavy Industries Co., Ltd.
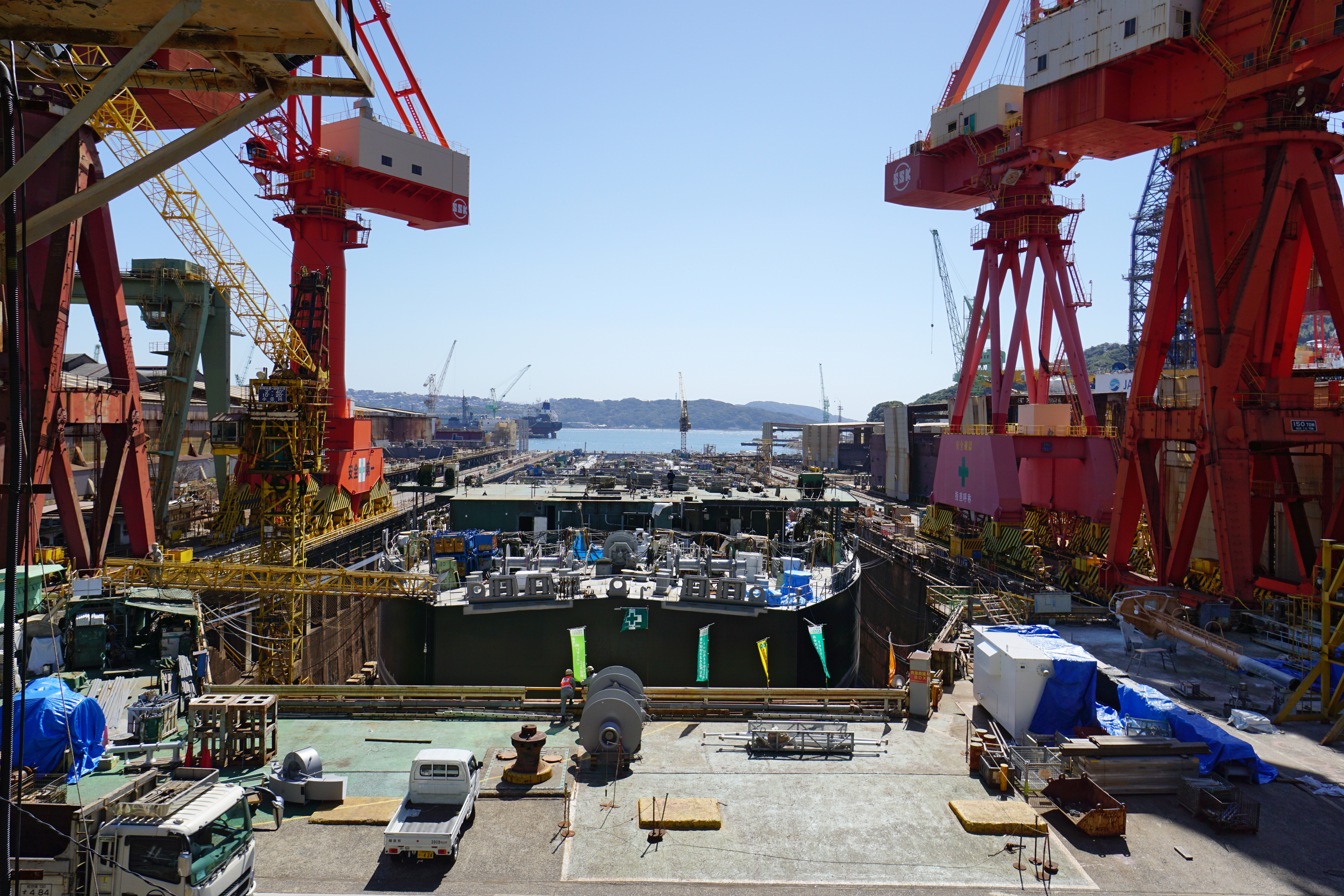
- Native name: 佐世保重工業株式会社
- Romanized name: Sasebo Jūkōgyō
- Formerly: Sasebo Ship Industry
- Type: Public KK
- Industry: Shipbuilding
- Founded: 1946; 80 years ago
- Headquarters: Sasebo, Nagasaki Prefecture, Japan
- Key people: Kensuke Namura (President & CEO)
- Products: Machine industry Ships
- Number of employees: 1,933 (total); 749 (non-consolidated) 1,184 (consolidated) (as of March 2014)
- Parent: Namura Shipbuilding
- Website: www.ssk-sasebo.co.jp

The Sasebo Heavy Industries Co., Ltd. (Japanese: 佐世保重工業株式会社, Hepburn: Sasebo Jūkōgyō), also simply known as the Sasebo Heavy Industries, is a company whose main business is heavy industry, based in Sasebo City, Nagasaki Prefecture. A wholly owned subsidiary of Namura Shipbuilding. Known as SSK. It is an acronym for Sasebo Ship Industry, which was the company name when it was first established.

== Overview ==
It was established in 1946, by inheriting the land and equipment of the Sasebo Naval Arsenal of the former Imperial Japanese Navy. The main industries are ships, the shipbuilding and remodeling of ships, and repairs, but the new shipbuilding business was suspended only in January 2022. It also handles maintenance and repair of vessels of the Maritime Self-Defense Force and the US Navy, which have a base in Sasebo City. In addition, it manufactures marine machinery, chemical industry machinery, and forgings (marine crankshafts, etc.). In marine crankshafts, although it does not reach the top share of Kobe Steel, it is still one of the major manufacturers in Japan. Shipbuilding factories and machine shops are located in the Tategami-cho area.

Of the equipment on the premises, the 250-ton crane on the 4th quay (commonly known as the Tategami quay) was brought from England in 1913 and is still in use today. This crane was once used for the equipment work of the battleship Musashi. The 4th dock is the former 7th dock of the Sasebo Naval Arsenal, which was secretly excavated for the maintenance of the two Yamato-class battleships, but it was used only once by Musashi. This dock was first utilized immediately after the end of the war, and was dismantled after storing all three aircraft carriers, Hayataka, Ibuki, and Kasagi. Further down, in 1962, it was used to build the 130,000-ton tanker Nissho Maru III, which was ordered from Idemitsu Kosan. The 2nd dock is provided as a shared facility for the US Navy and the Maritime Self-Defense Force, and cannot be used independently by SSK for commercial use. In addition, many brick buildings from the Sasebo Naval Arsenal era still exist and are still used as factory facilities.

On the other hand, the fact that there are many old facilities and many restrictions on the layout of the premises has led to inferior productivity and cost competitiveness compared to new shipyards in Japan and overseas, and improvement has always been an issue. In addition, due to the outflow of human resources and delays in equipment renewal due to repeated rationalization, it will be difficult to meet the high-performance and high-quality requirements of vessels ordered by overseas shipowners in the latter half of the 2010s, resulting in a significant delay in delivery.

Until 2010, there was also an iron structure department that manufactures bridges, etc., and the factory was located in the Hakudake area in the suburbs. However, due to the withdrawal from the steel structure business in the same year, the Shiratake factory was closed and dismantled, and the site was sold to Aeon Kyushu in 2012. Currently, the former sites are AEON Sasebo Shiratake Shopping Center and Sanikleen Kyushu Sasebo Sales Office.

Nishinihon Fluid Giken, a venture company, is a group of engineers spun out from the company, which became independent with only seven people from the castle town "Sasebo", became a novel.

== Timeline ==
- 1946 - Established Sasebo Ship Industry Co., Ltd.. It operates by renting the site and facilities of the former Navy Arsenal.
- January 1956 - Received the 4th dock. Capital and business alliance with Ocean Fisheries. Became a subsidiary of the ocean fishery.
- July 1961 - Renamed to Sasebo Heavy Industries Co., Ltd..
- May 1962 - Due to the second surplus of state-owned property, all rented facilities become company-owned property.
- August 1966 - Capital and business alliance with Nippon Kokan. Leaving the umbrella of the ocean fishing industry, it became a subsidiary of Nippon Kokan.
- February 1968 - Received a surplus from the 3rd dock. August - Opened a factory in the steel structure department in the Hakudake area.
- 1978 - Becomes a member of the Kurushima Dock Group. Even after the dismantling of the Kurushima Dock Group in the late 1980s, former group leader Hisao Tsubouchi remains a major shareholder. Tsubouchi died in December 1999.
- November 2005 - At a machine shop that manufactures marine crankshafts, etc., the use of the 1939 forging press and manipulator inherited from the former Sasebo Navy Arsenal was terminated, and replaced by the new 2,500 ton forging press and manipulator.
- 2010 (Heisei 22 - The steel structure business was abolished. Shiratake factory closed.
- October 2014 - Became a wholly owned subsidiary of Namura Shipbuilding.
- February 2021 - Announced suspension of new shipbuilding business only in January 2022.
- 12 January 2022 - The last new ship before the suspension was completed and handed over to the shipowner.

== Equipment ==
From "Factory Information" posted on the official website of Sasebo Heavy Industries Co., Ltd. (viewed on May 19, 2021).

- 1 construction dock (4th dock) (repaired by the summer of 2022 for both repairs)
- 4 repair docks (1st, 3rd, 5th, 6th docks)
- Mooring quay (for equipment and repair) Total length of about 1,210m (3rd, 4th, 5th, instep, west of Jijima, south of Jijima, Akasaki quay)

== Products ==
The main body of shipbuilding is large commercial ships, VLCC in the 1960s, container ships and RO-RO ships after the shipbuilding recession in the 1980s, and large bulk carriers and tankers after the late 1990s. The Maritime Self-Defense Force ships are also building transport ships. The machine industry sector manufactures large forged products and pressure vessels.

=== Merchant ship ===
==== Tanker ====
- The latest type developed was the 115,000-ton type Aframax tanker.

==== Bulk carrier ====
- The latest type developed was the wide shallow draft type 85BC.
- The final completed ship before the suspension of the new shipbuilding business was the 82,000 DWT bulk carrier jointly developed with Namura Shipbuilding.

=== Naval Ship ===
==== Test ship ====
- JS Kurihama

==== Transport ship ====
- Atsumi-class tank landing ship
- LCU-2001-class utility landing crafts

==== Auxiliary ship ====
- ASU-81-class target support crafts

==== Submarine chaser ====
- Mizutori-class submarine chaser

=== Government ship ===
- Patrol boat

=== Machinery ===
- Propeller axis
- Marine crankshaft
- Intermediate axis
- Ladder stock
- Pressure vessel
