= Japanese destroyer Suzutsuki =

Two Japanese destroyers have been named Suzutsuki:

- Japanese destroyer Suzutsuki (1942), an Akizuki-class destroyer launched in 1942 and stricken in 1945
- JS Suzutsuki, an Akizuki-class destroyer launched in 2012
