= Sub Area Activity Hanshin =

Japanese Navy Hanshin Base Corps

Sub Area Activity Hanxshin
- Near Kobe City, Japan in Japan
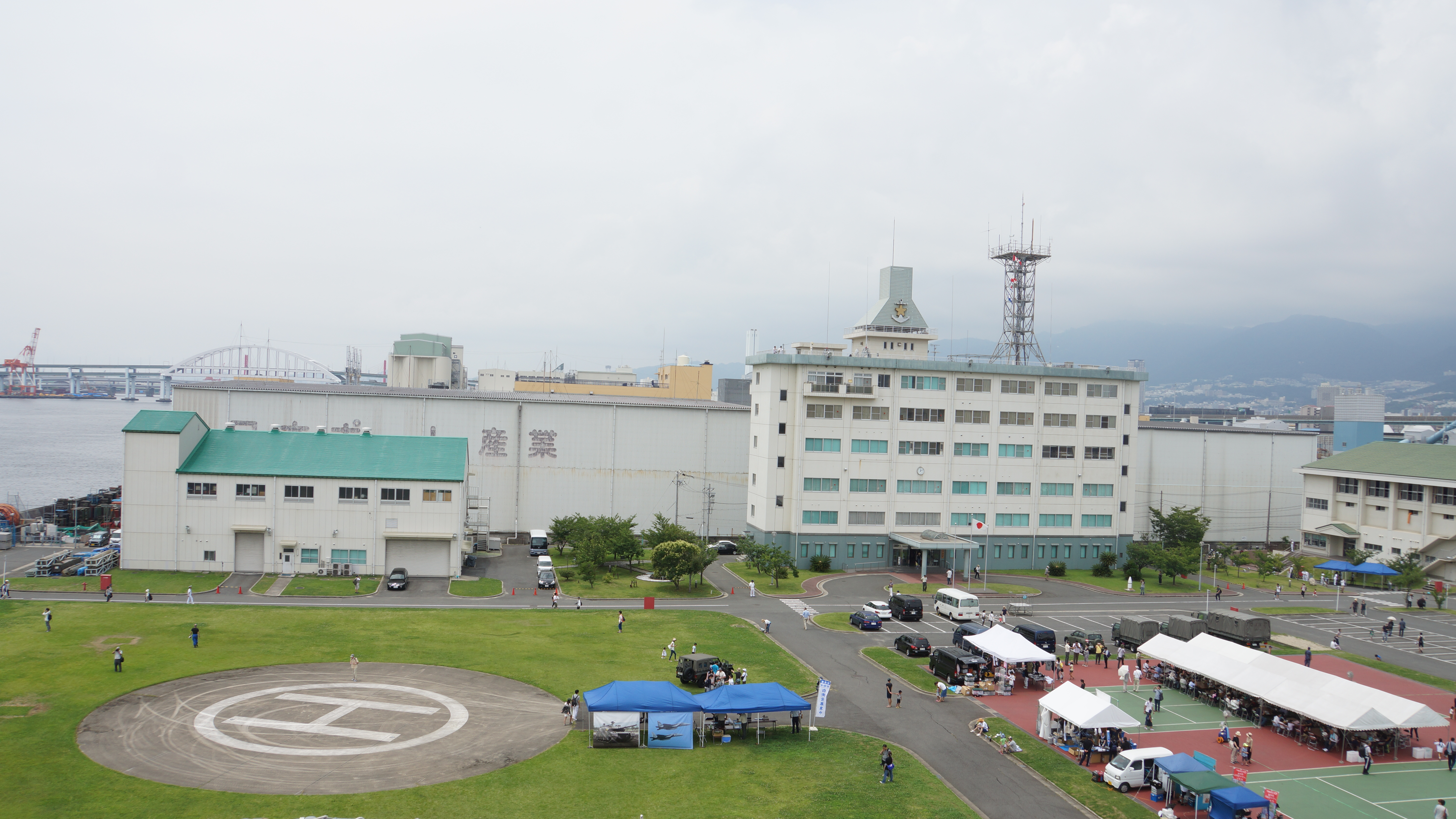

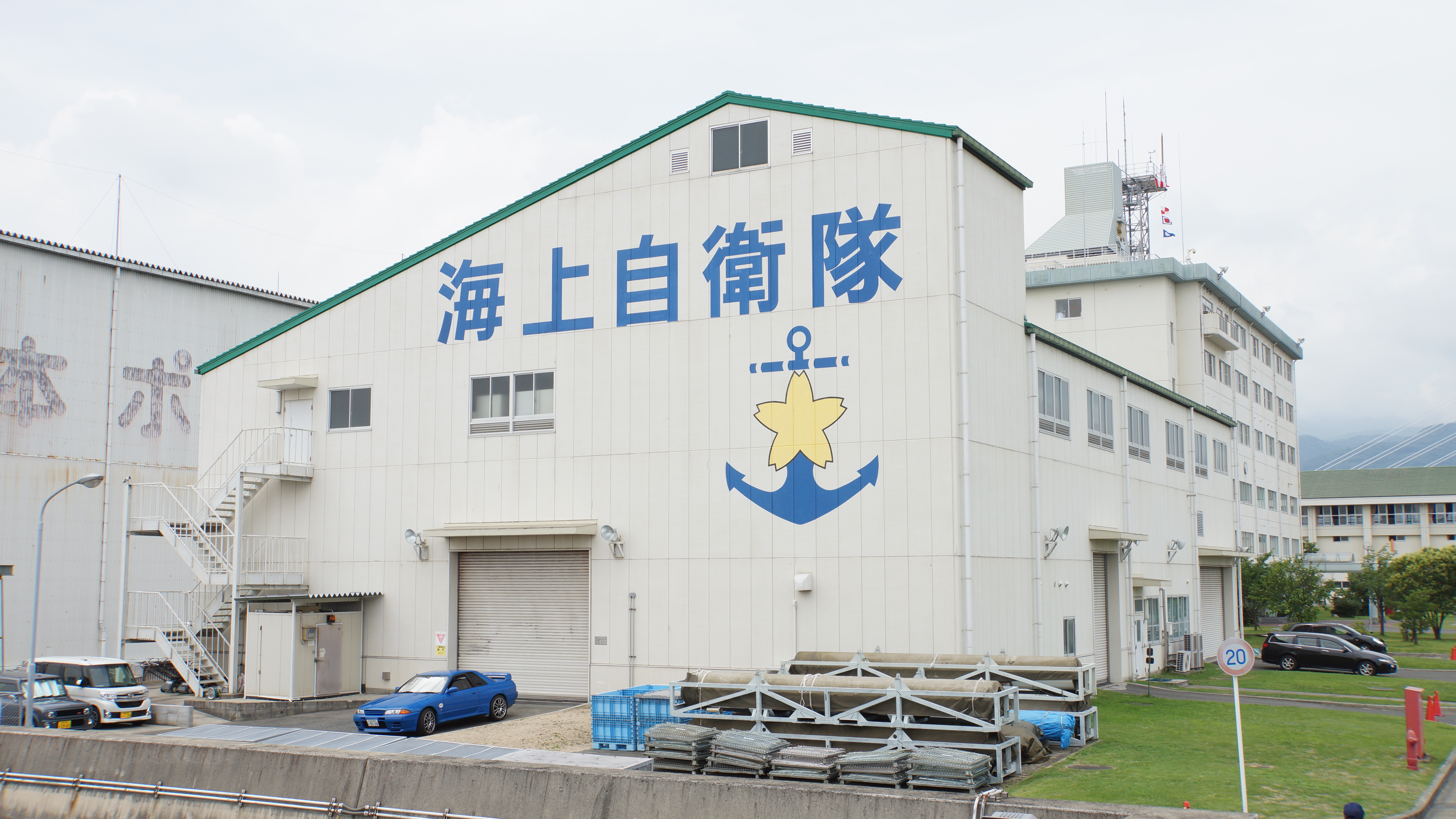

Site information
- Type: JMSDF facility
- Owner: Ministry of Defense
- Operator: Japan Maritime Self-Defense Force
- Condition: Operational
- Website: https://www.mod.go.jp/msdf/hanshin/

Location
- Location in Japan
- Coordinates: 34°42′17.6″N 135°17′11.4″E

Site history
- In use: 1952 – present

Sub Area Activity Hanshin (Hanshin Kichitai) or also known as Hanshin Base Corps, is one of the base corps under the Kure District Force of the Japan Maritime Self-Defense Force. The place was renamed from Osaka Base Corps. The headquarters is located at 37 Uozakihamamachi, Higashinada-ku, Kobe City, Hyogo Prefecture. The abbreviation is Hanki. It guards and monitors Osaka Bay and Harima-nada Sea.

== History ==
1952, 1 August, established by the National Safety Agency Security Force, the Japan Coast Guard 5th Regional Coast Guard Headquarters "Route Enlightenment Department" was renamed "Osaka Route Enlightenment Corps" and was incorporated into the Yokosuka District Force Western Route Enlightenment Corps. 1 November, the 5th Mine Warfare Force was newly incorporated into the Osaka Route Enlightenment Corps.

1953, 16 September, Osaka route enlightenment corps is abolished. "Osaka Base Corps" was newly transferred to the Kure District Base Corps.

1954, 1 July, the Maritime Self-Defense Force was established, and the Kure District Force was newly formed and transferred to subordinates. 1 October, new edition of Yura Base Division.

1955, 16 December, new edition of Kaya Magnetic Measurement Station.

On 31 March 1957, new edition of Awaji Guard Station.

On 1 May 1959, Kobe base detachment is newly formed.

1961, 31 March, the 5th Mine Warfare Force was abolished.

On 15 June 1963: Incorporated the 2nd Port Patrolling Corps.

On 30 March 1968, the Osaka Base Corps headquarters moved to Kobe City and renamed from "Osaka Base Corps" to "Hanshin Base Corps". Kobe base detachment abolished, Osaka dispatch corps reorganized.

On 1970, 2 March: The 31st Mine Warfare Force was incorporated from the Kure District Force. 30 September, The Osaka Detachment was abolished.

On 31 March 1972, the 31st Mine Warfare Force was abolished. Incorporated the 33rd Mine Warfare Force from the 2nd Mine Warfare Force.

On 28 August 1974, the 33rd Mine Warfare Force was abolished. Incorporated the 41st Mine Warfare Force from the 1st Mine Warfare Force.

On 1 December 1975, Awaji Guard Station is abolished. New edition of Kii Guard Station.

On 27 March 1986, The 41st Mine Warfare Force was abolished. Incorporated the 45th Mine Warfare Force.

On 28 November 1990, the 45th Mine Warfare Force was abolished. Incorporated the 15th Mine Warfare Force.

On 20 October 1992, The 2nd Port Patrolling Corps was abolished. Incorporated the 1st Port Patrol.

On 19 March 1997: Renamed the 15th Mine Warfare Force to the 42nd Mine Warfare Force due to the revision of the corps number.

1998, 22 June, the 1st Port Patrolling Corps was abolished.

On 3 June 2013: Kii Security Office was abolished

== Unit formation ==
- Base Corps Headquarters
  - 42nd Mine Warfare Force
    - JS Tsunoshima (MSC-683)
    - JS Naoshima (MSC-684)
  - Yura base division
  - Temporary magnetic measuring station

== Gallery ==
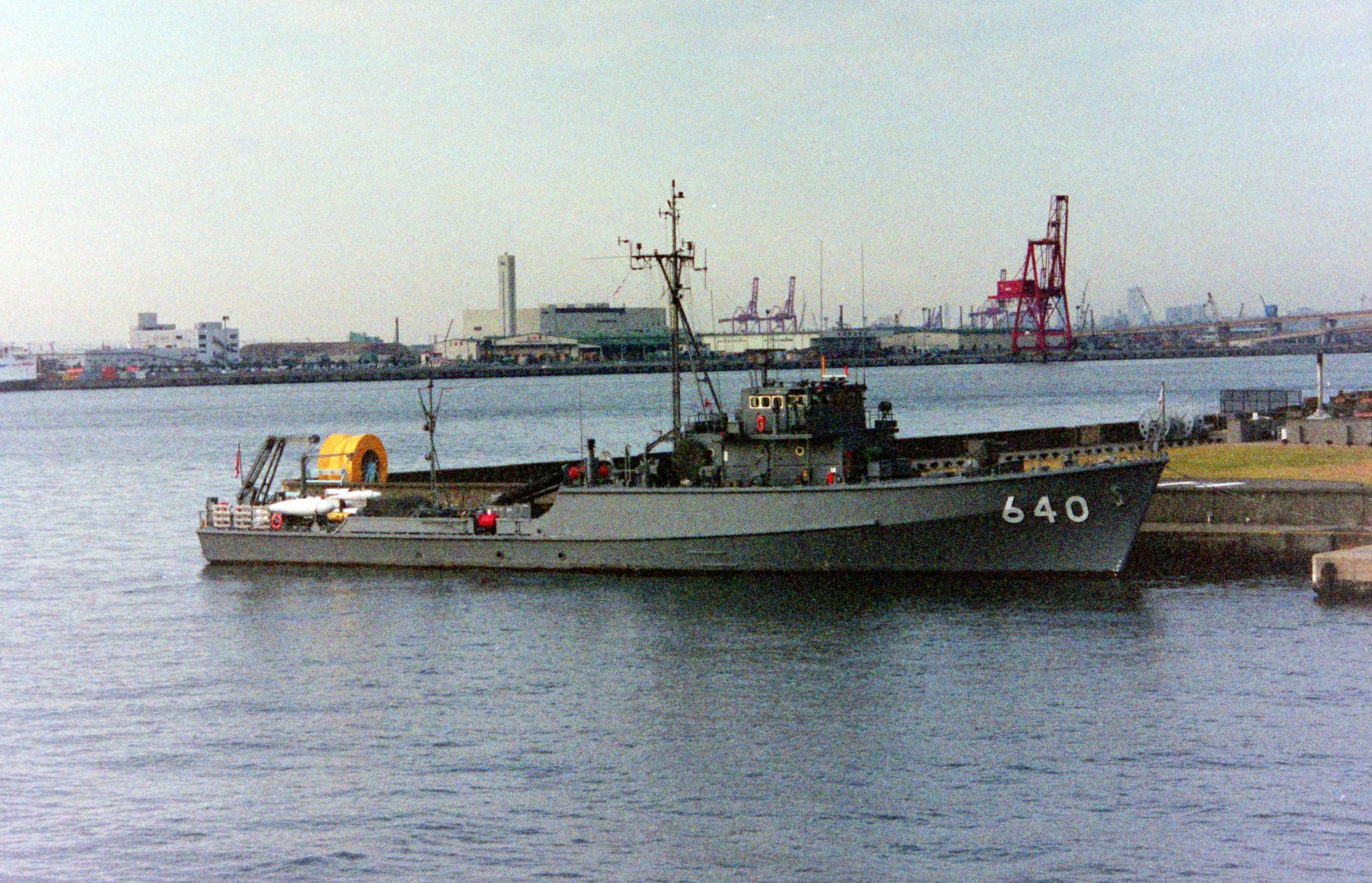
JS Takane on 15 January 1987.

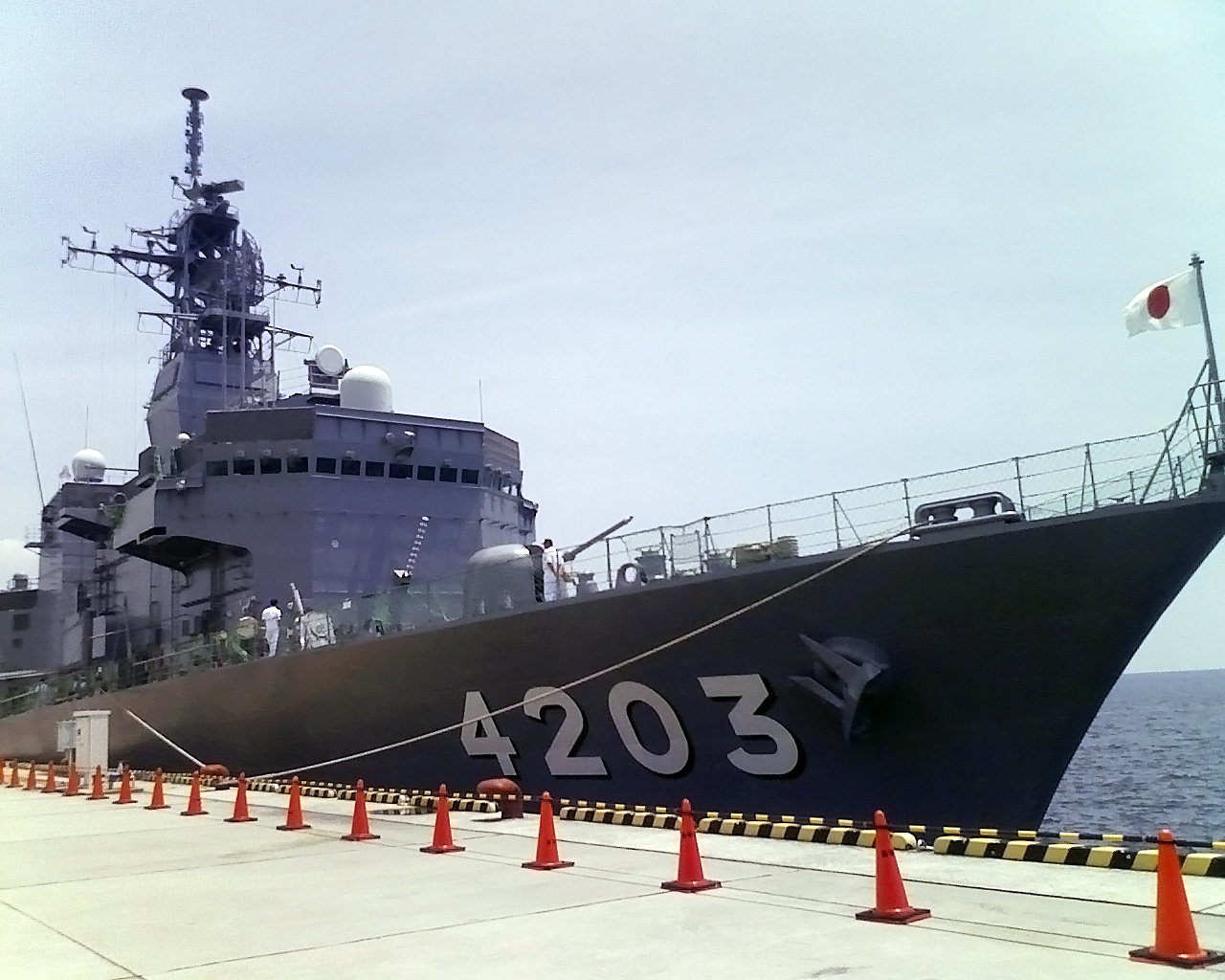
JS Tenryū on 20 July 2008.

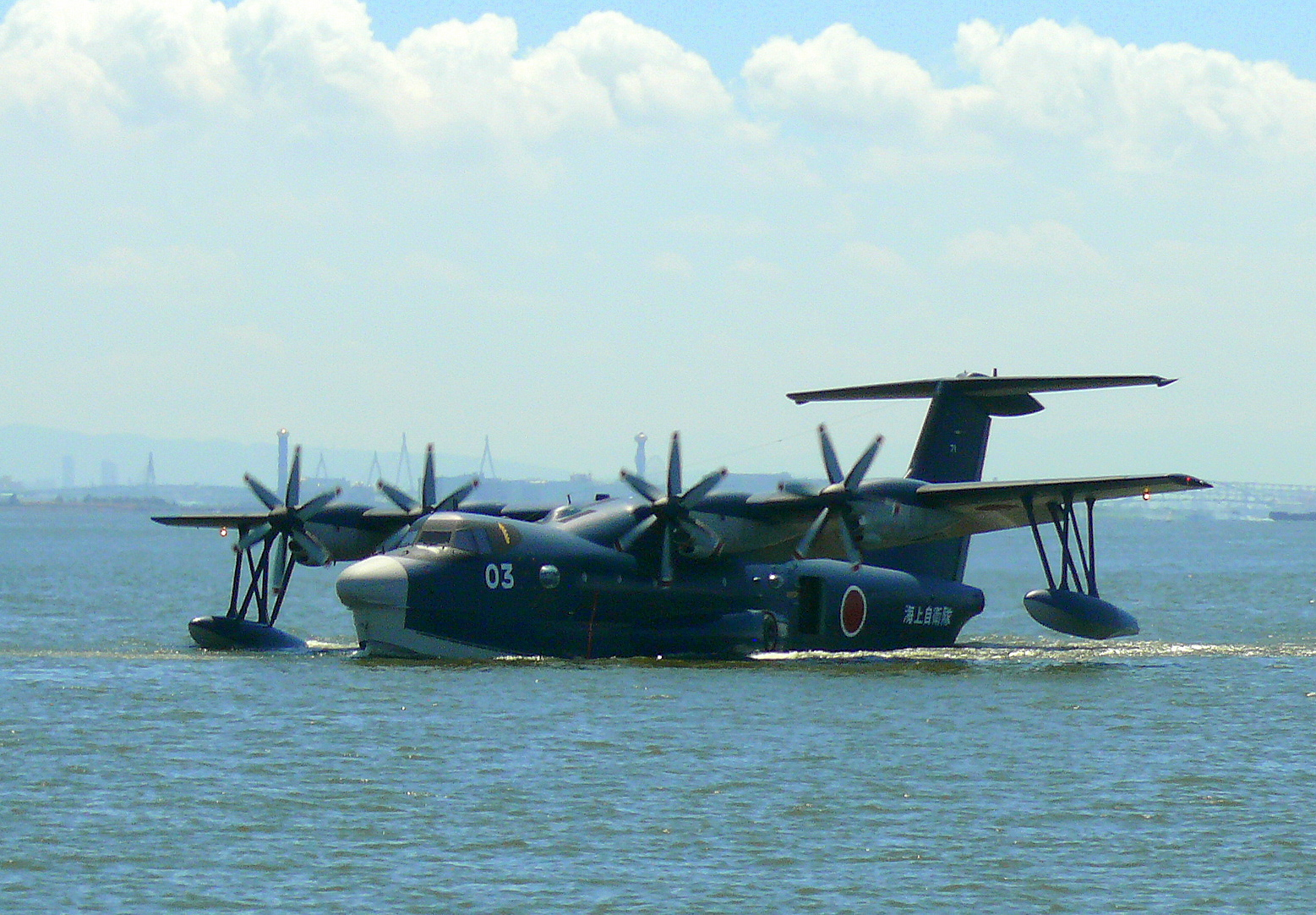
JMSDF US-2 on 19 July 2010.

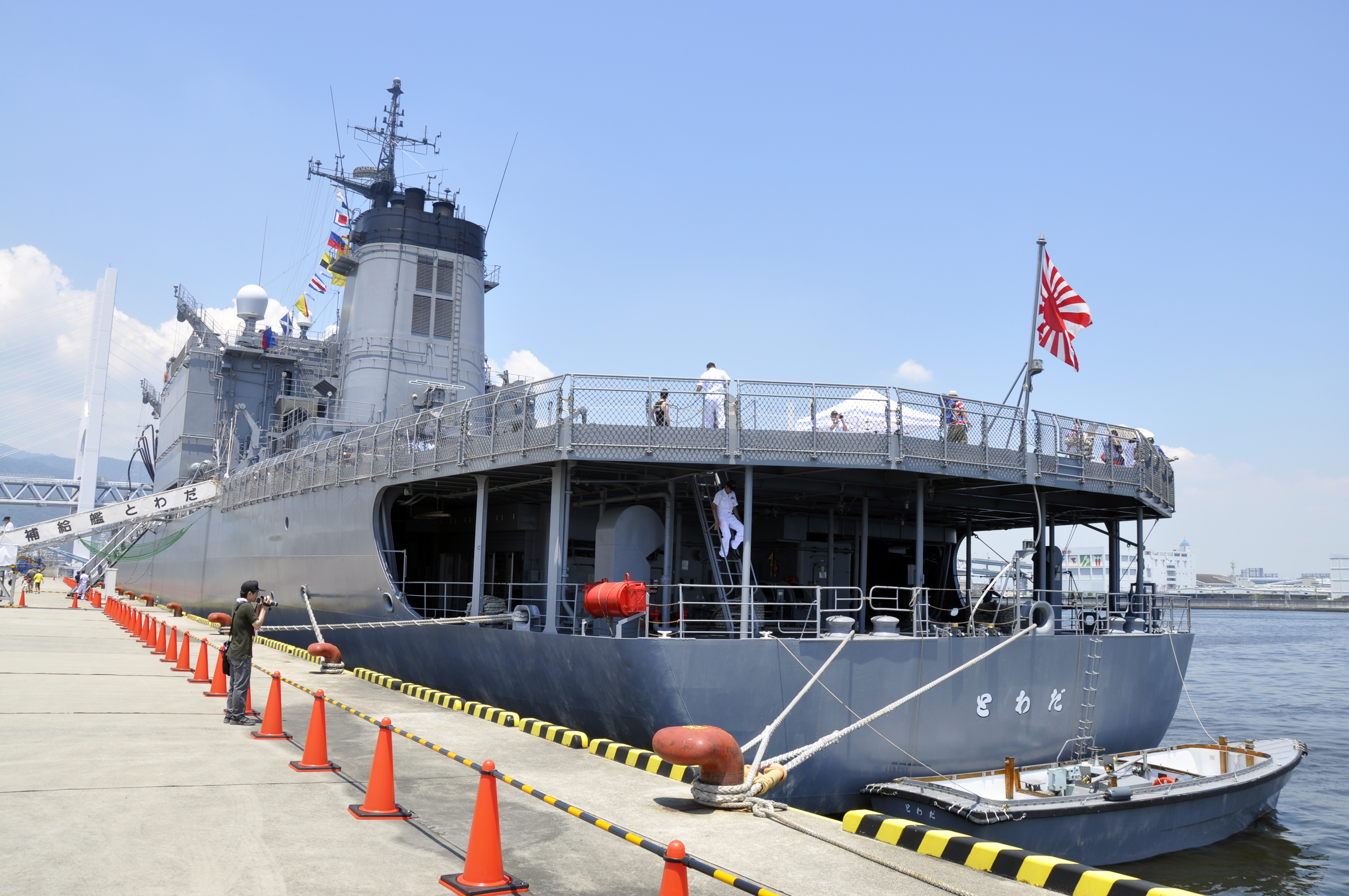
JS Towada on 16 July 2011.

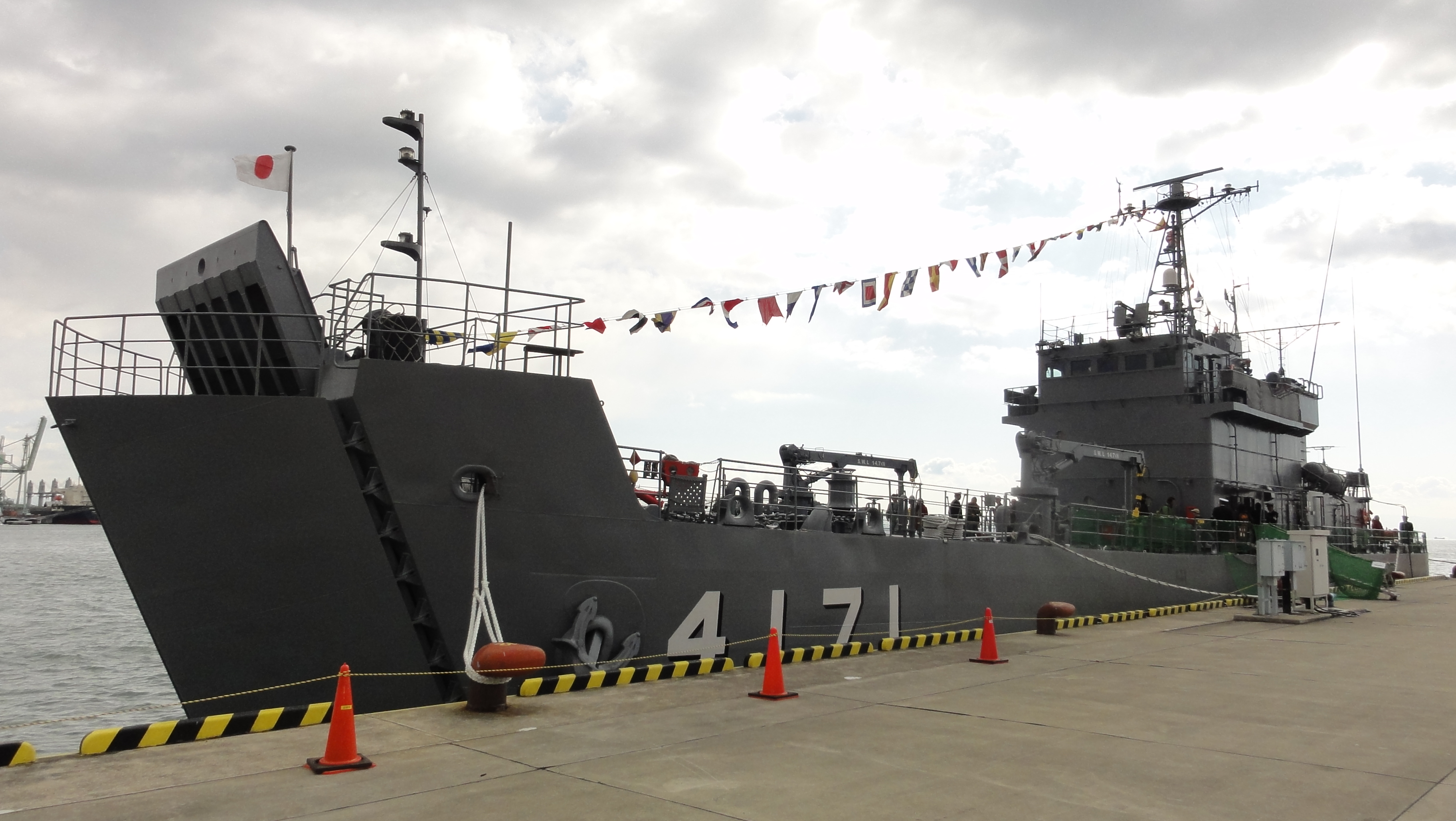
JS LSU-4171 on 11 February 2012.

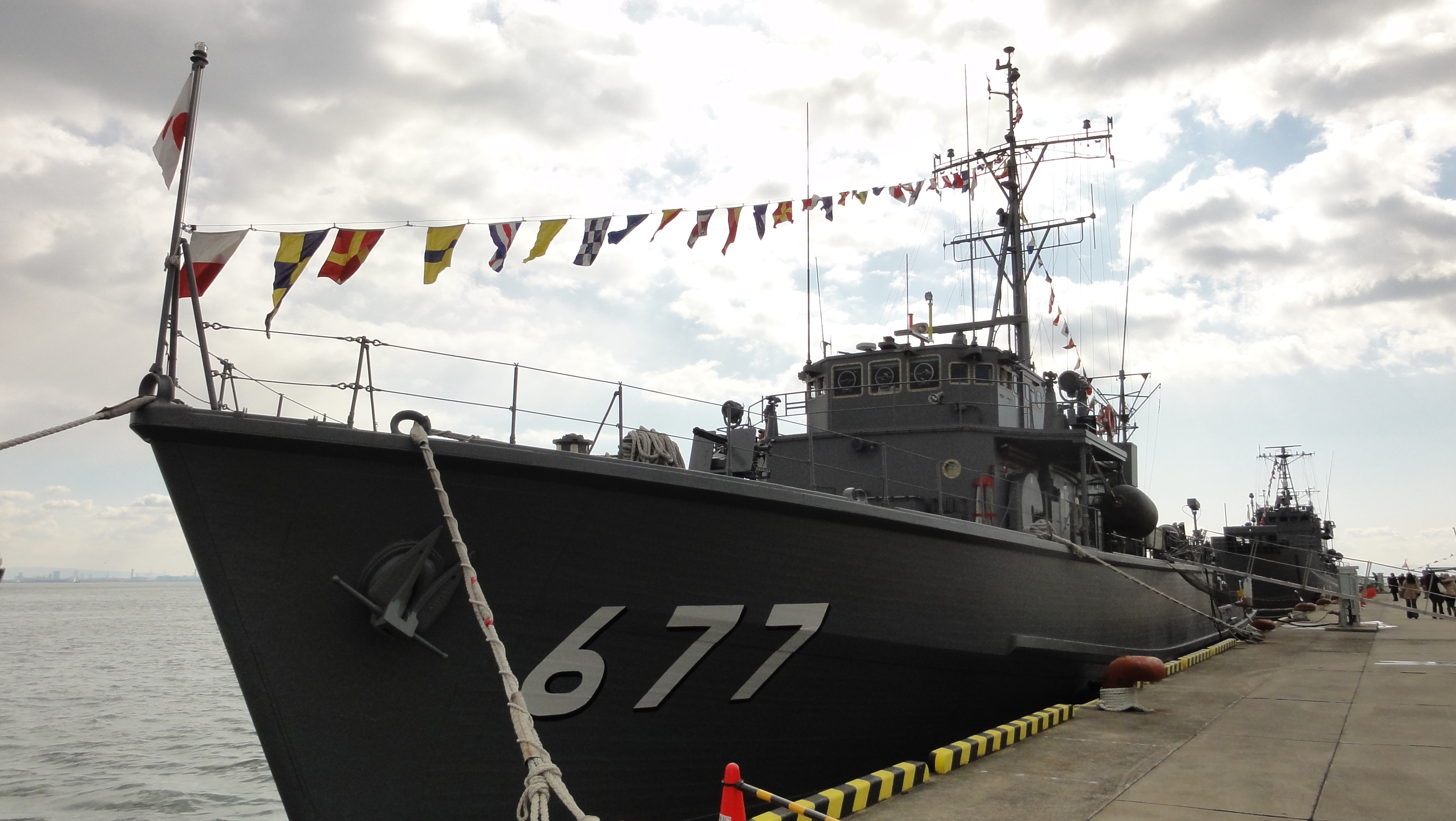
JS Makishima on 11 February 2012.

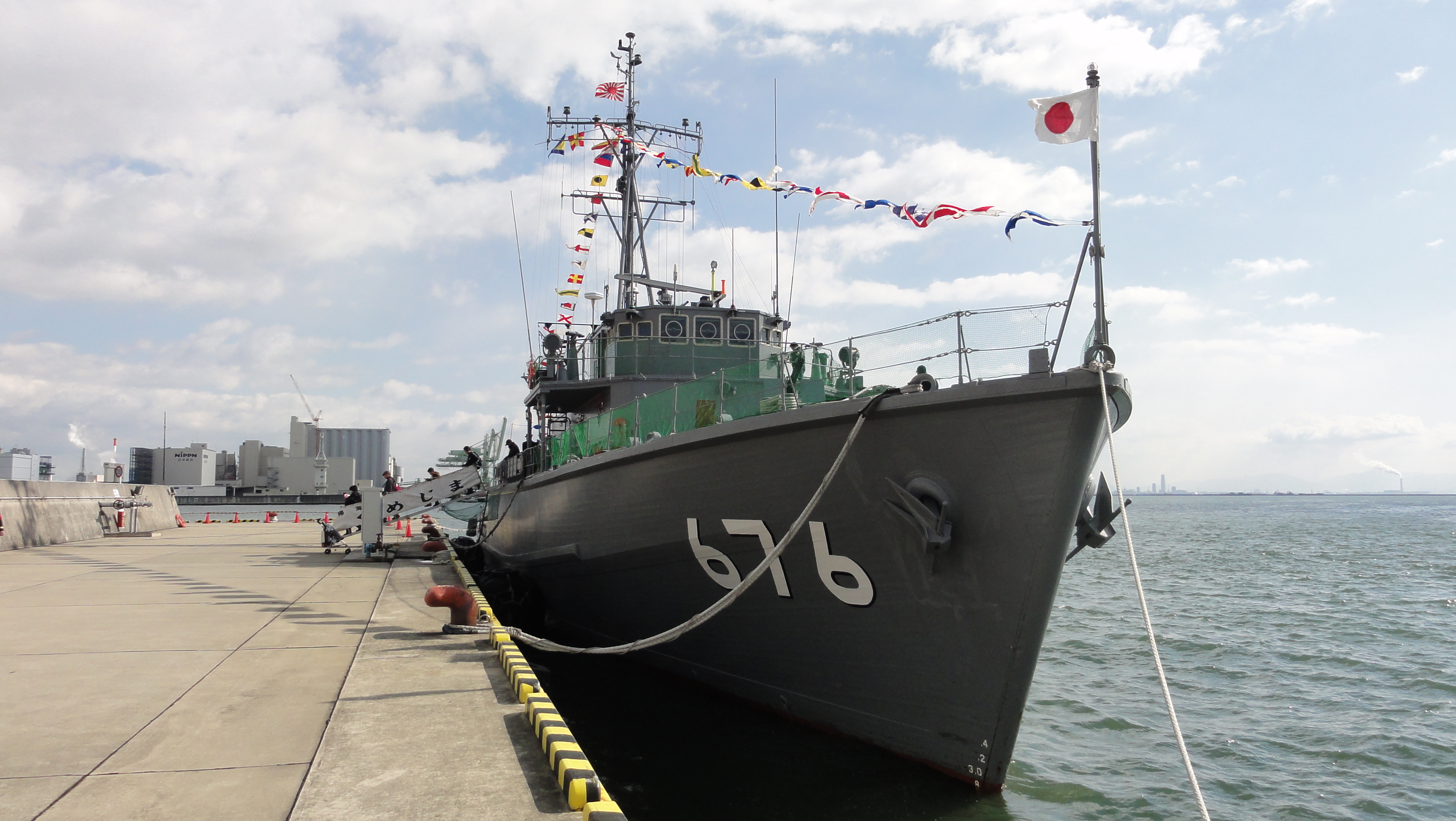
JS Kumejima on 11 February 2012.

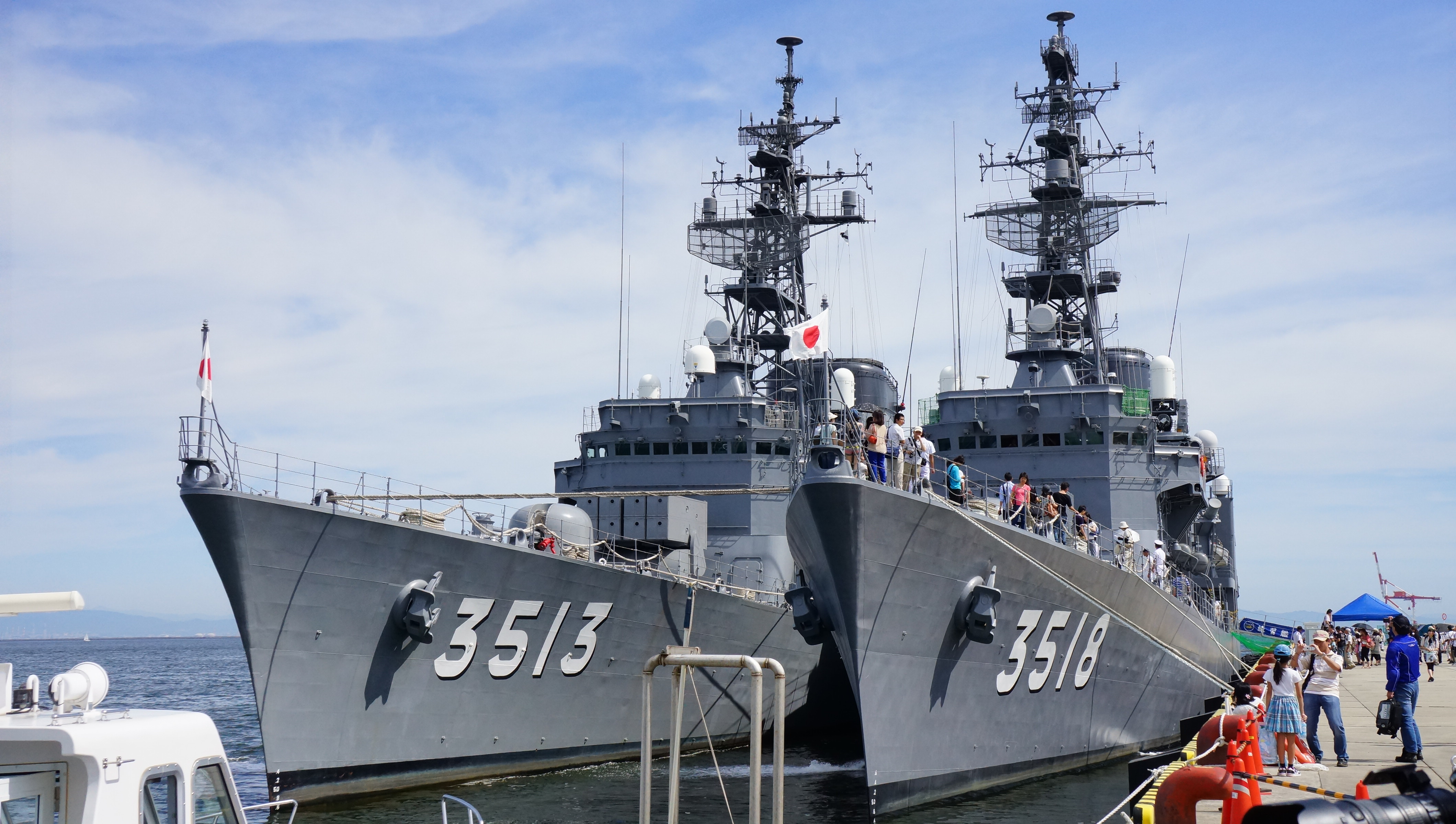
JS Setoyuki and JS Shimayuki on 20 July 2013.

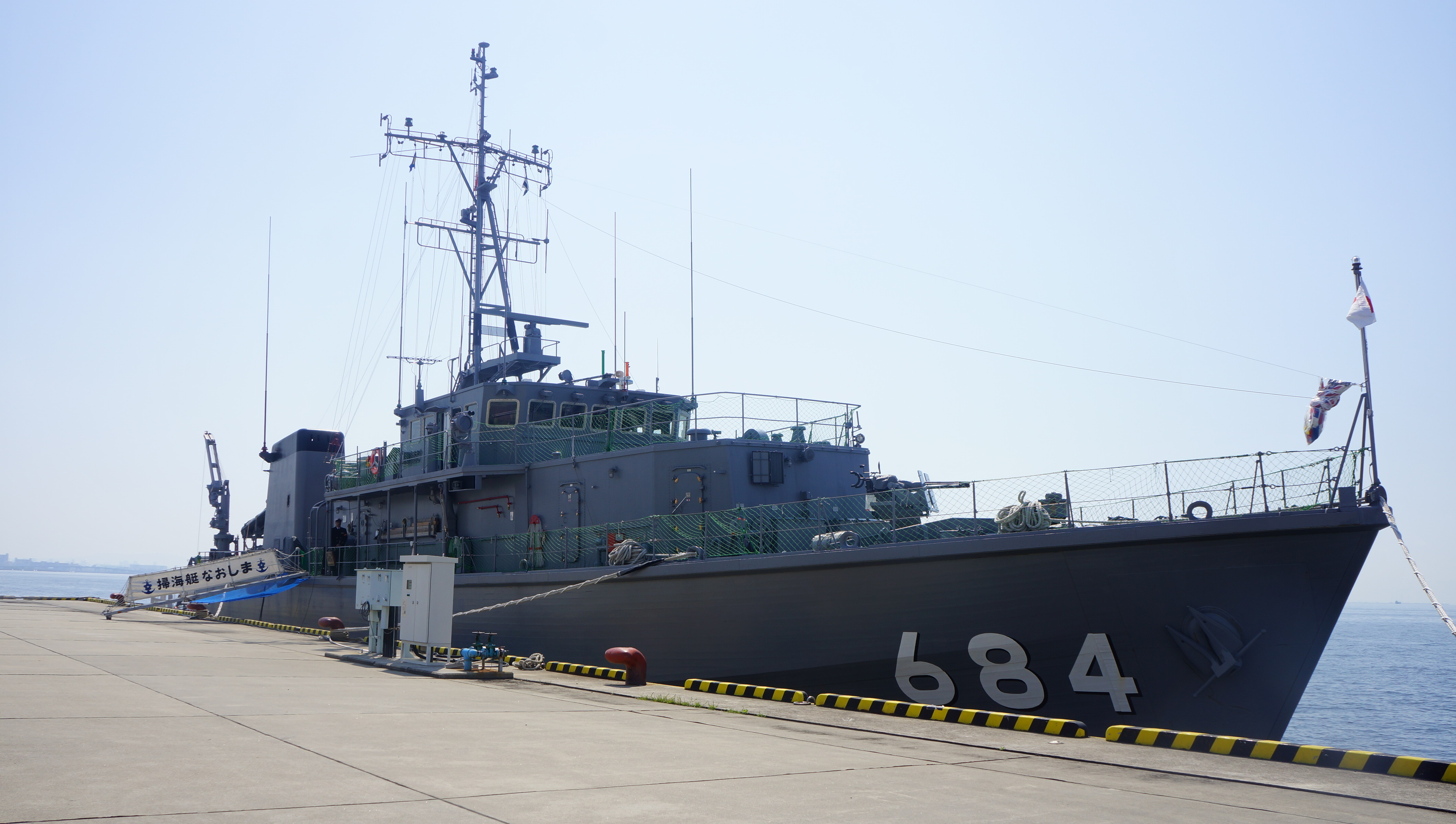
JS Naoshima on 27 April 2014.

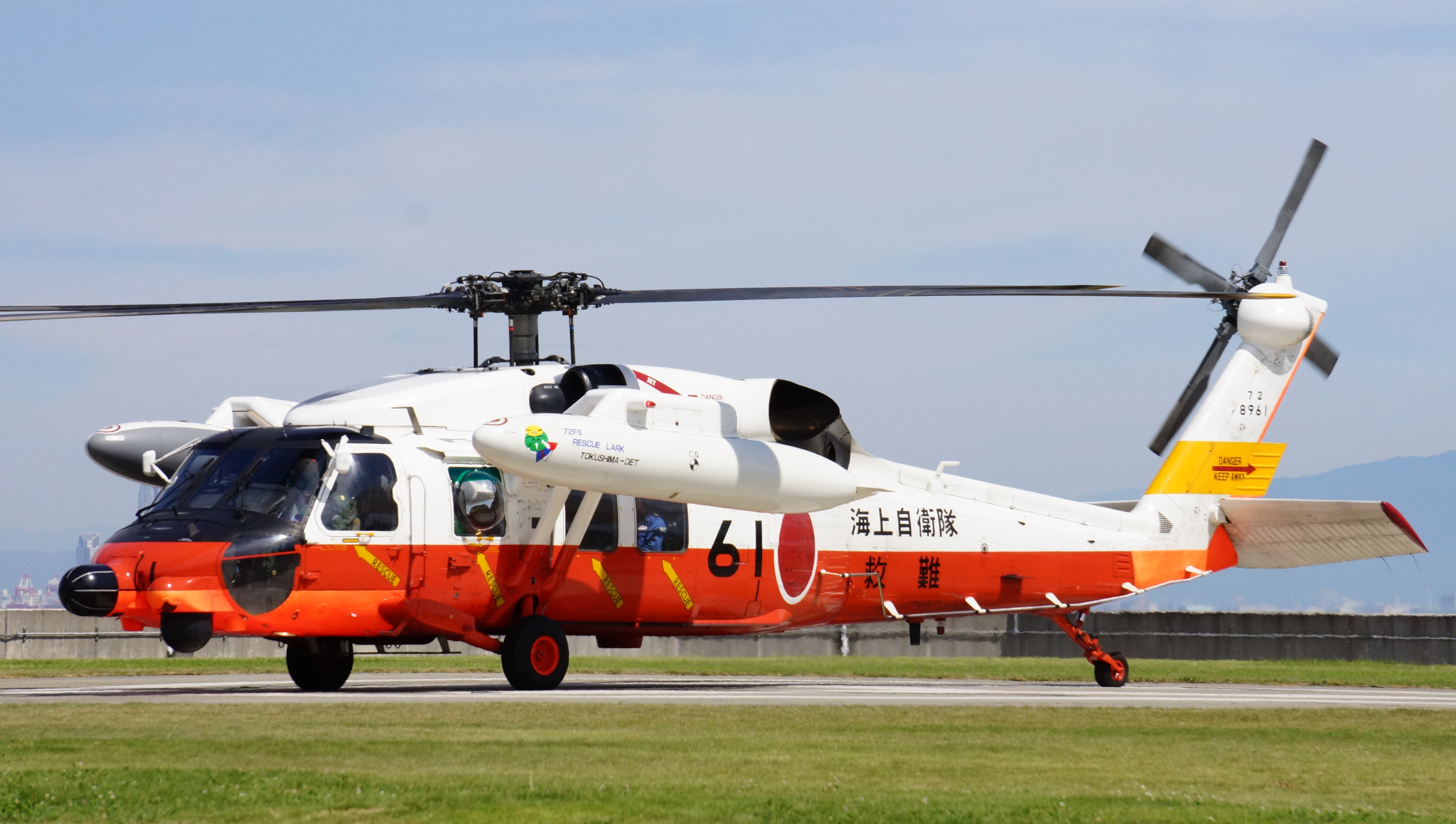
JMSDF UH-60J on 20 July 2013.

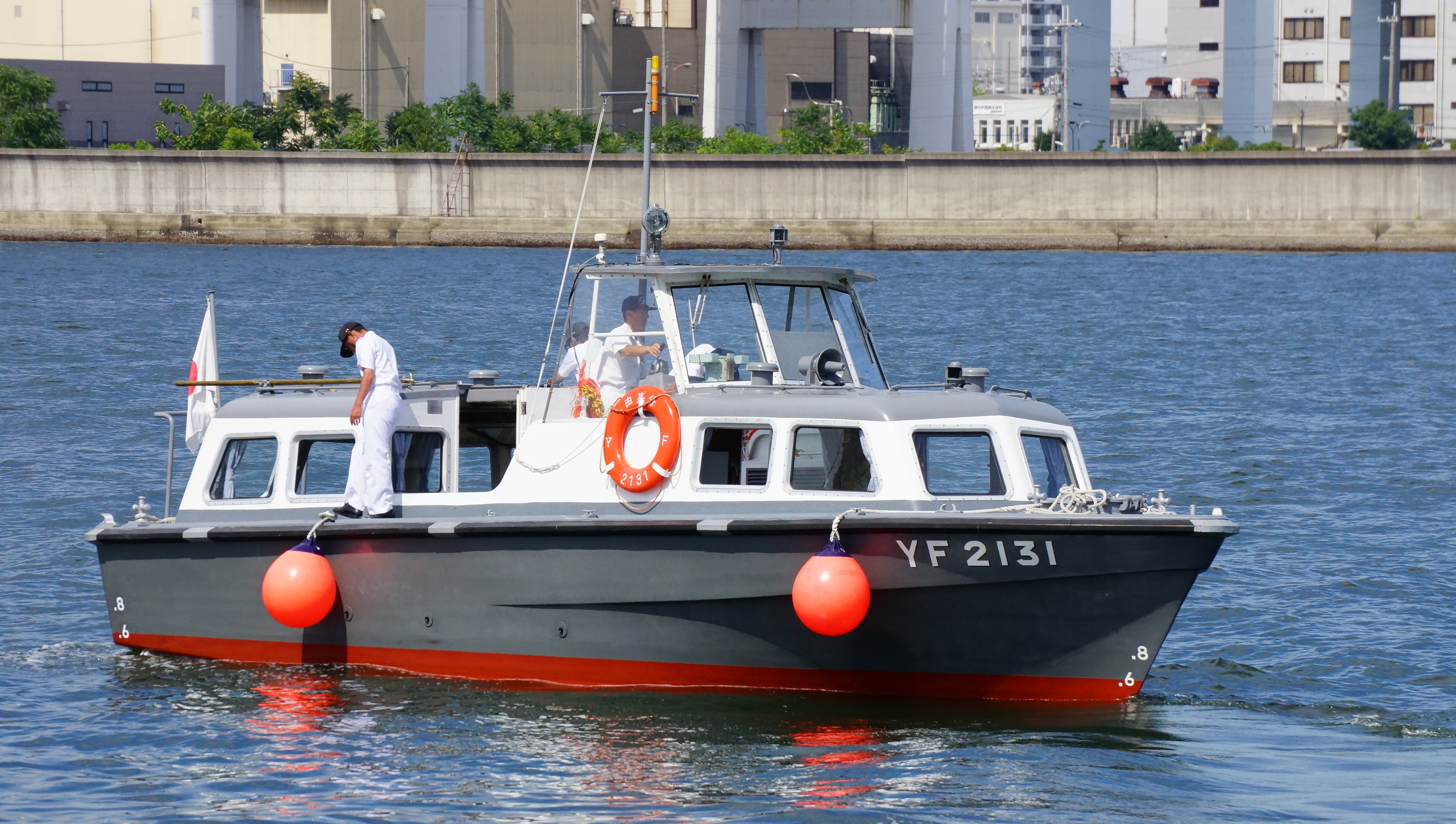
JS YF-2131 on 20 July 2013.

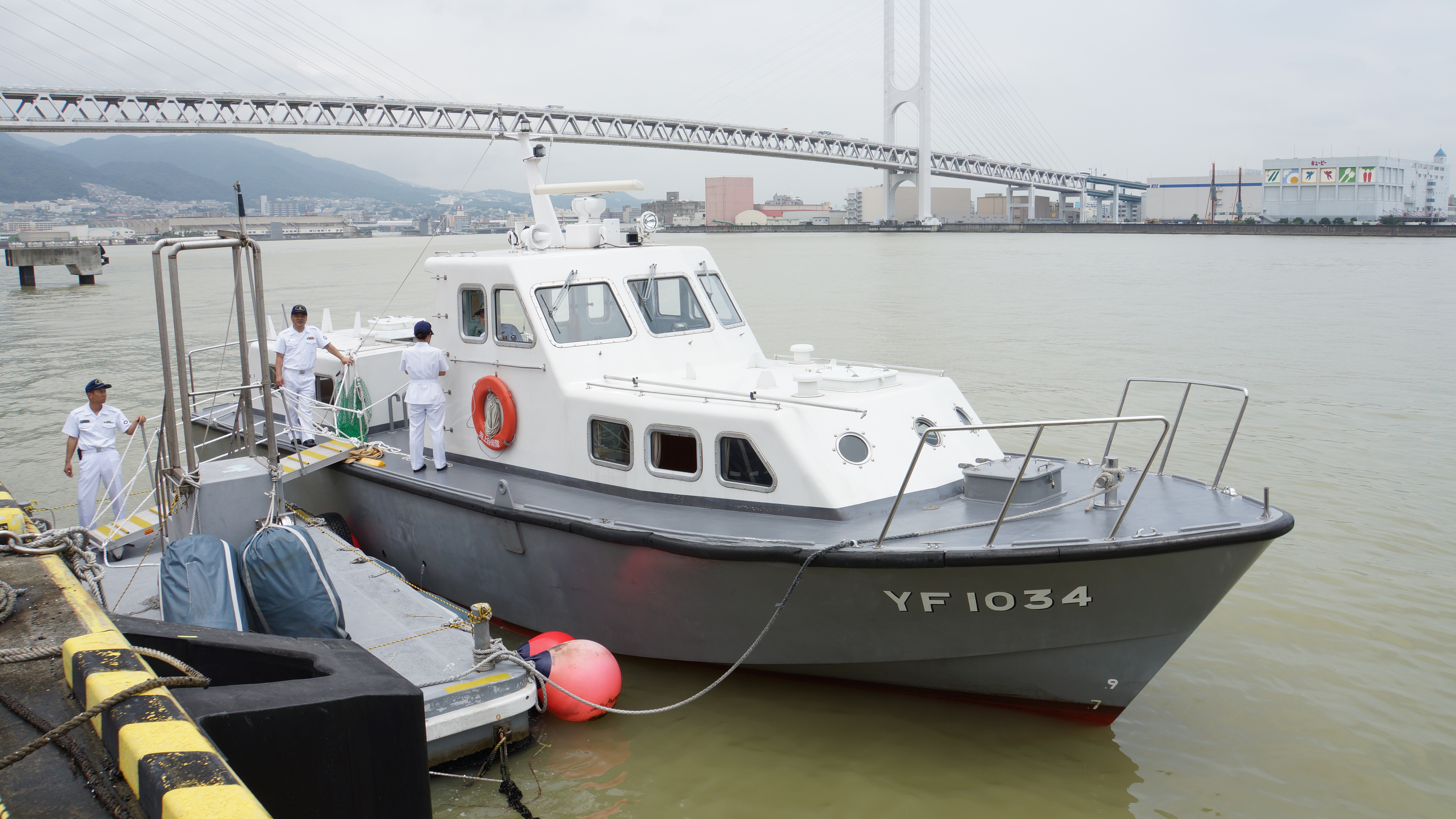
JS YF-1034 on 18 July 2015.

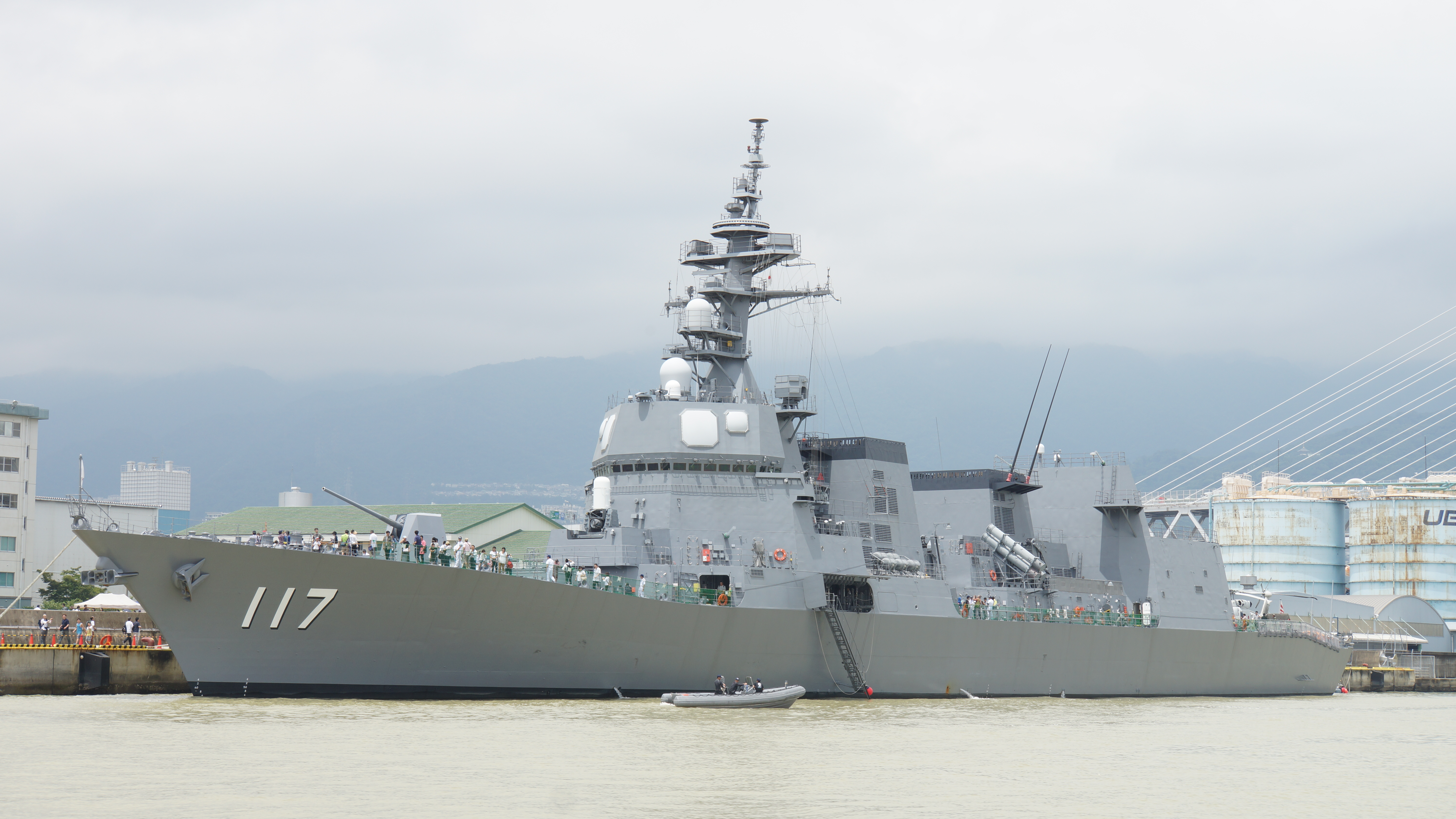
JS Suzutsuki on 18 July 2015.

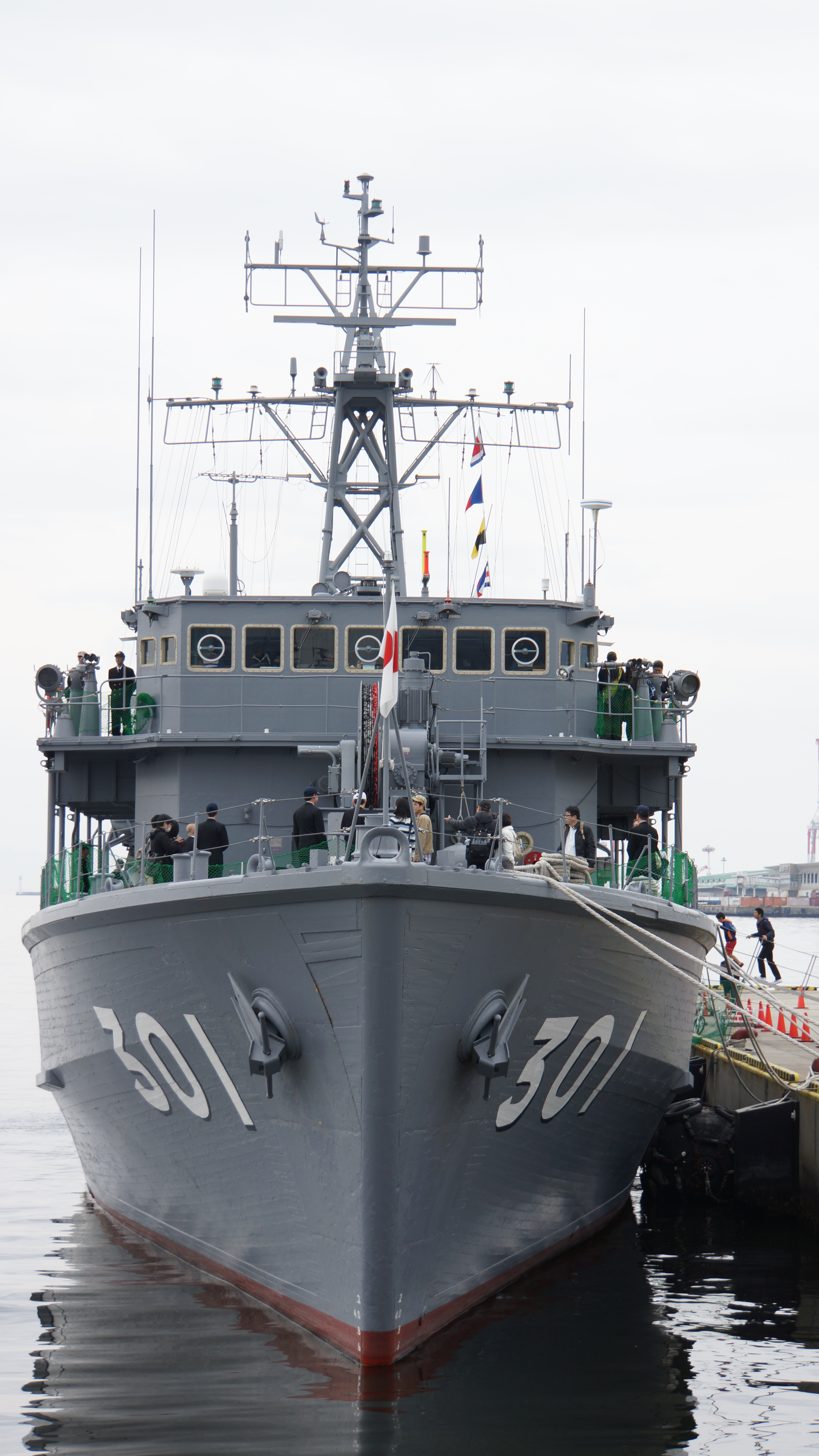
JS Yaeyama on 6 March 2016.

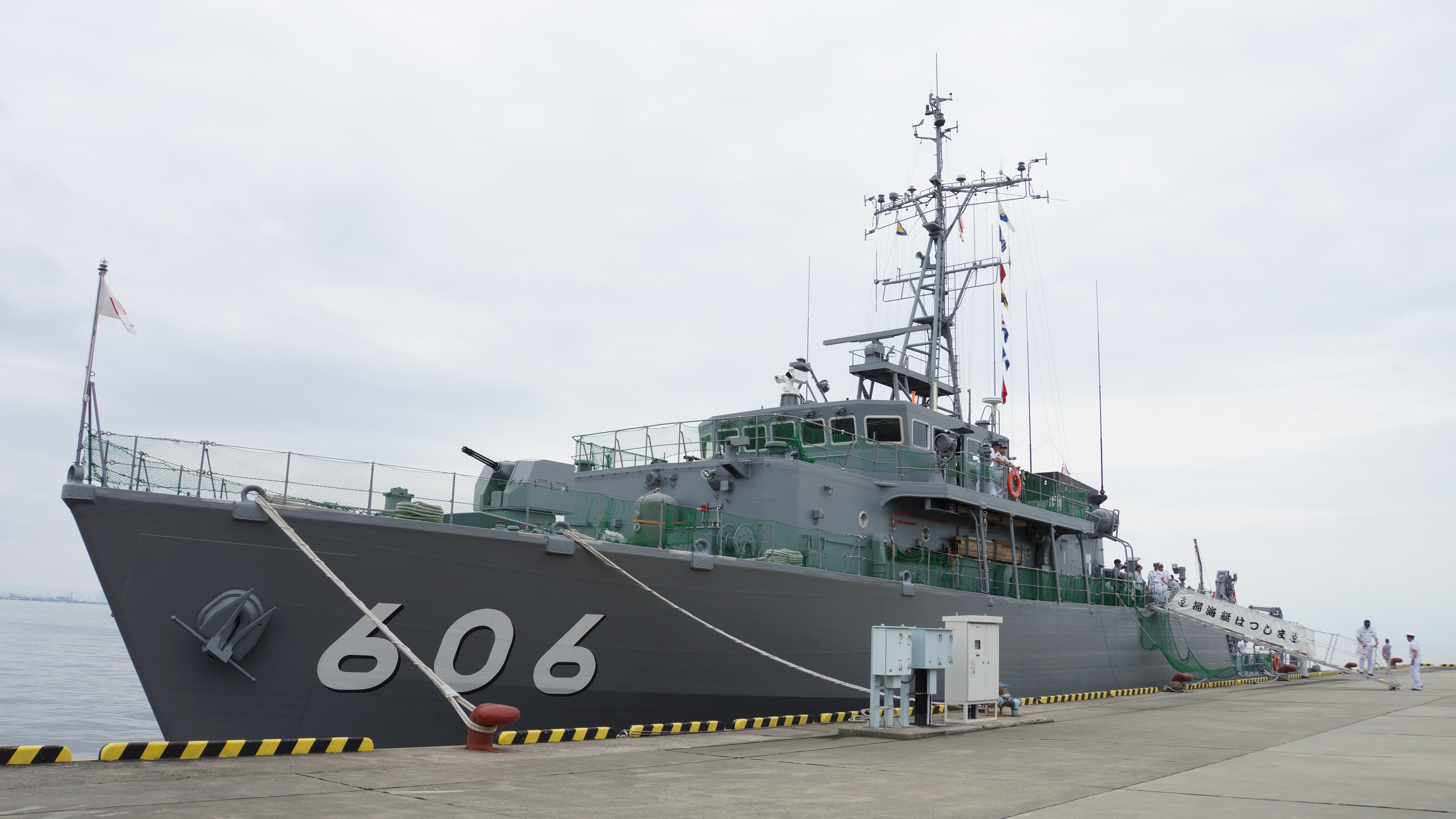
JS Hatsushima on 12 June 2016.

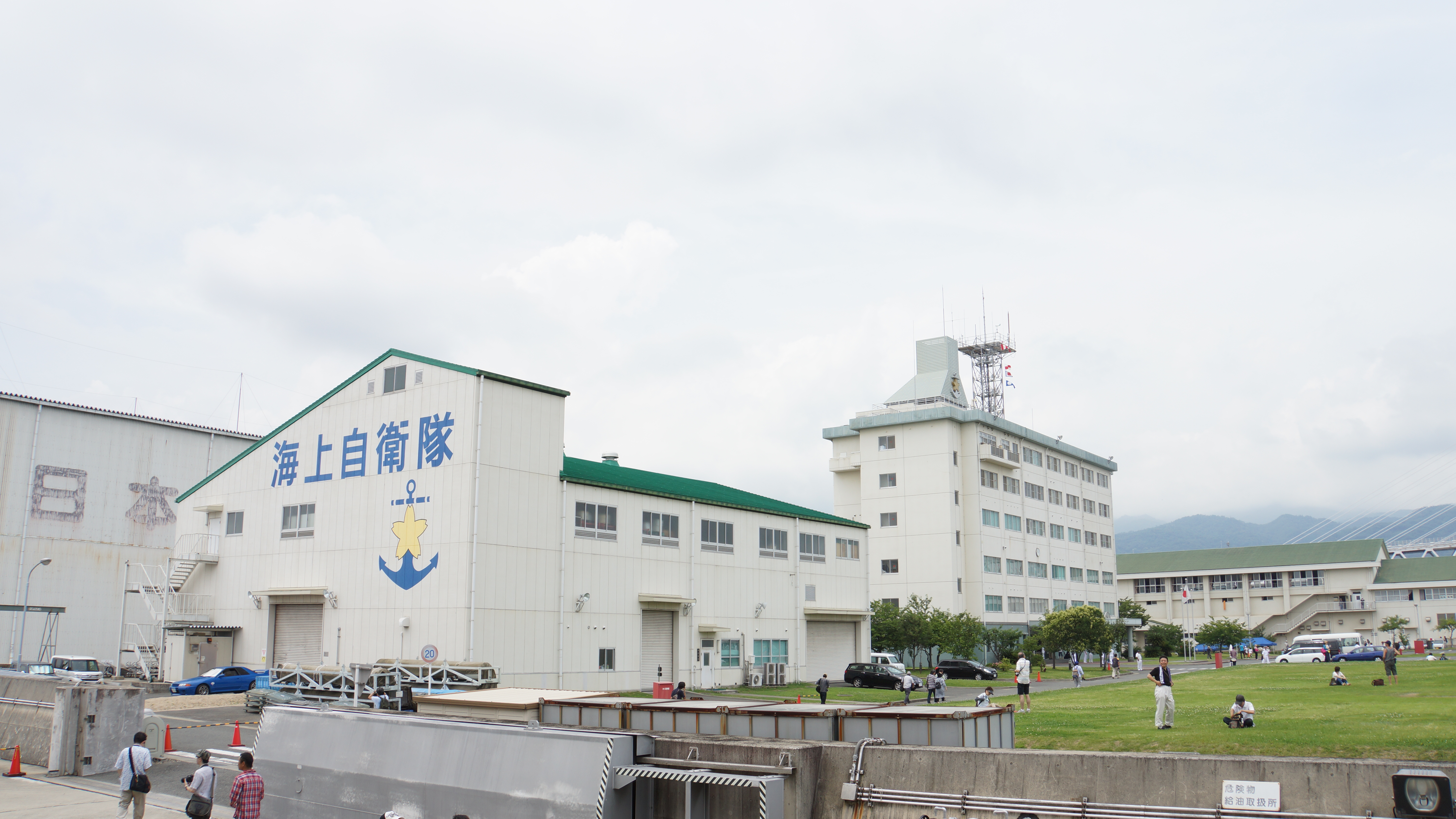
Hanshin Naval Base on 10 July 2016.

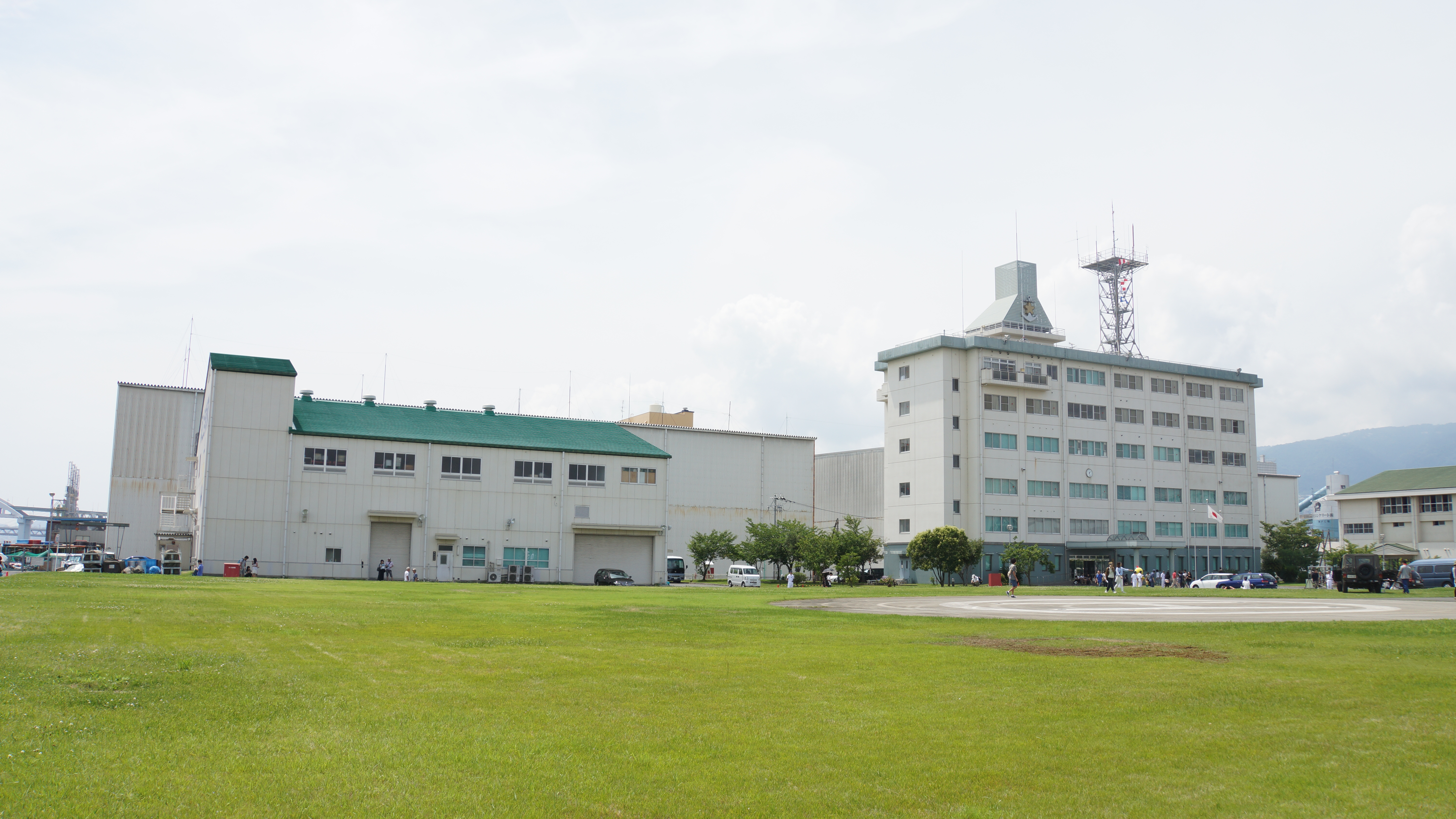
Hanshin Naval Base on 10 July 2016.

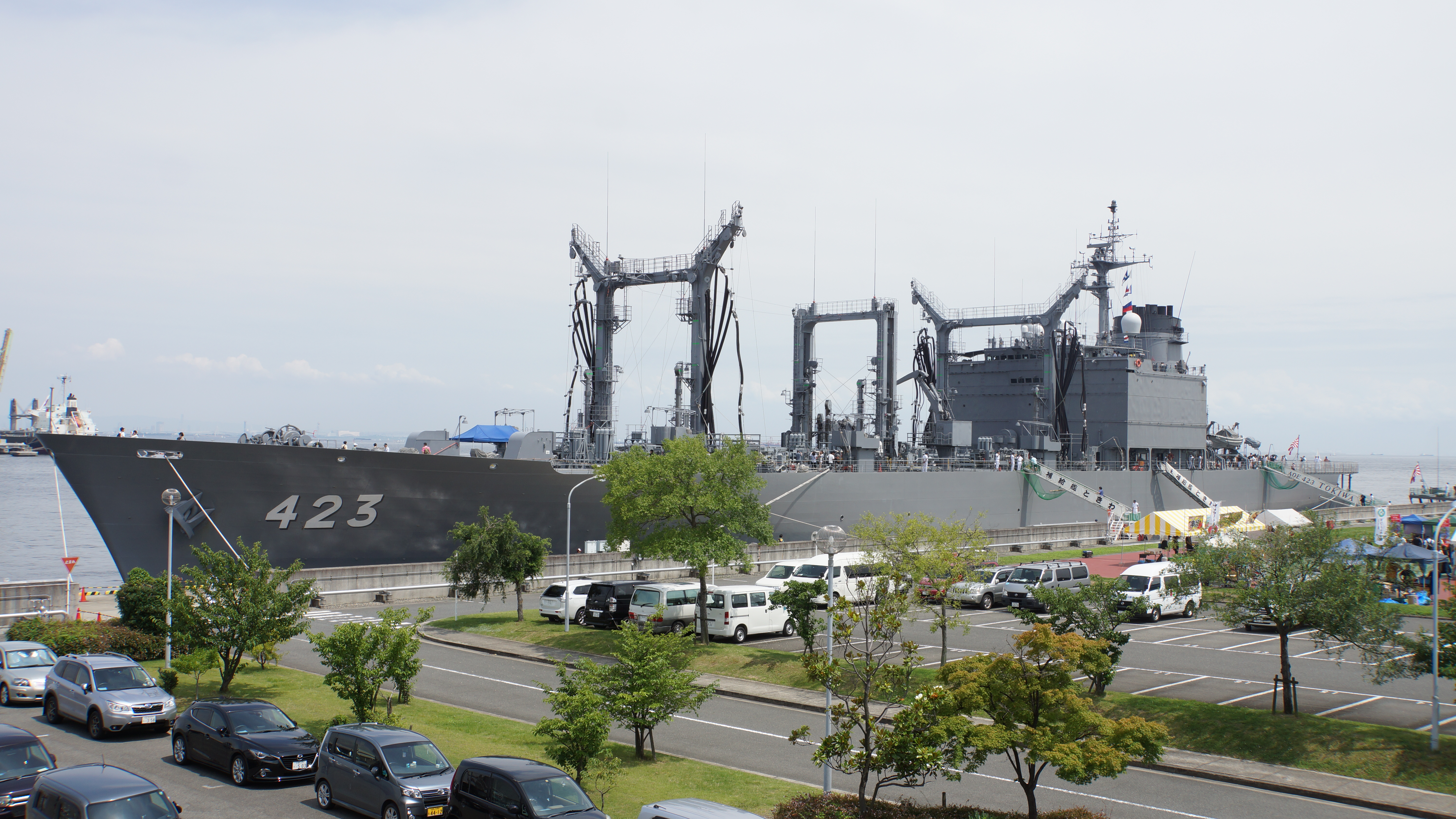
JS Tokiwa on 10 July 2016.

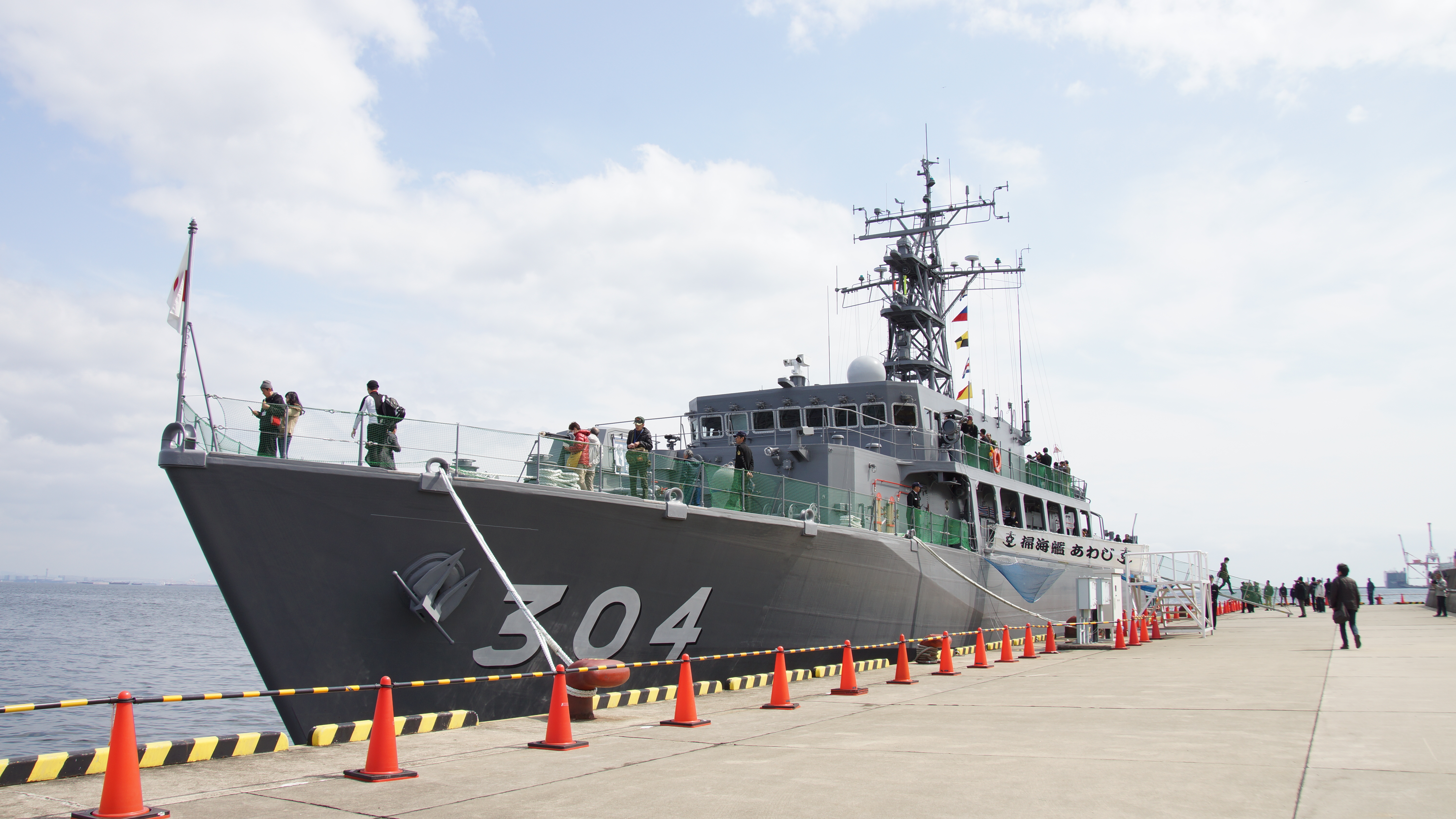
JS Awaji on 1 April 2017.

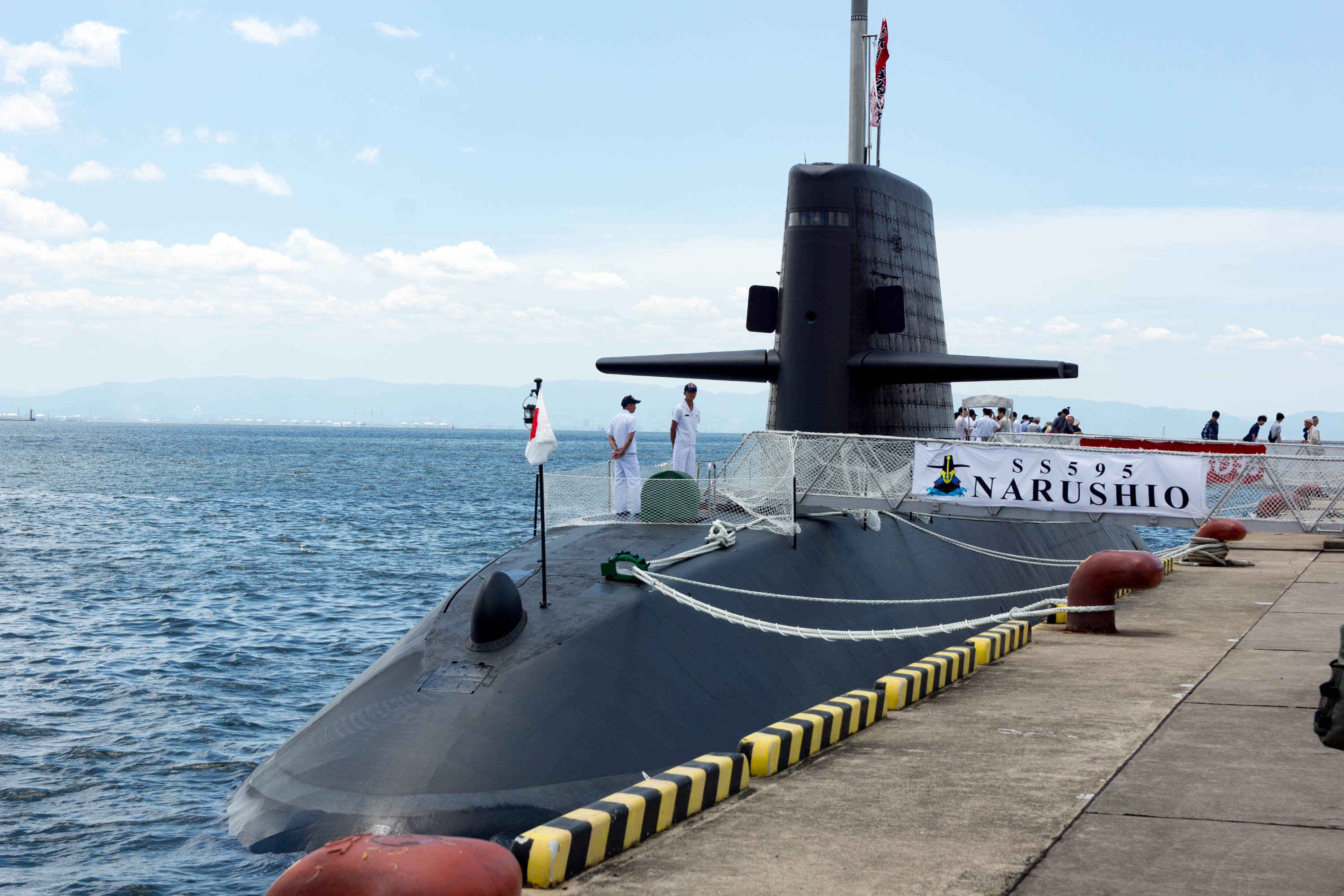
JS Narushio on 4 June 2017.
