= JS Inazuma (DD-105) =

Destroyer of the Japan Maritime Self-Defense Force

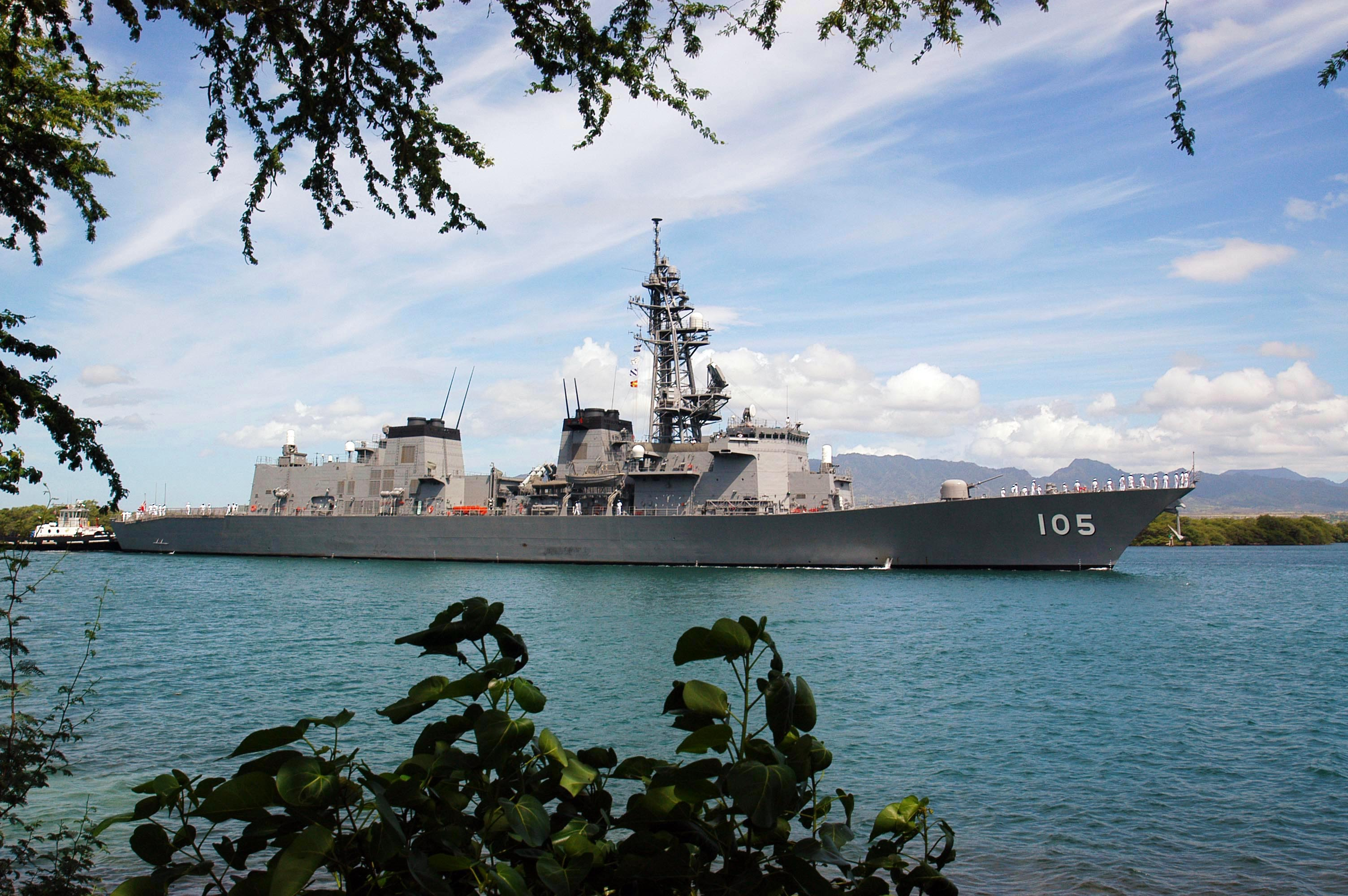
- JS Inazuma on 25 June 2004

History

Japan
- Name: Inazuma; (いなづま)
- Ordered: 1995
- Builder: Mitsubishi, Nagasaki
- Laid down: 8 May 1997
- Launched: 9 September 1998
- Commissioned: 15 March 2000
- Home port: Kure
- Identification: MMSI number: 431999646; Pennant number:DD-105
- Status: Active

General characteristics
- Class & type: Murasame-class destroyer
- Displacement: 4,550 tons standard, 6,200 tons hull load
- Length: 151 m (495 ft 5 in)
- Beam: 17.4 m (57 ft 1 in)
- Draft: 5.2 m (17 ft 1 in)
- Propulsion: 2 × IHI-GE LM2500 gas turbines; 2 × KHI-RR SM1C gas turbines; 60,000 shp (45 MW); 2 shafts, cp props
- Speed: 30 knots (56 km/h; 35 mph)
- Complement: 165
- Sensors & processing systems: OYQ-9 CDS (w/ Link-11); OYQ-103 ASWCS; FCS-2-31 fire-control systems; OPS-24B air search radar; OPS-28 surface search radar; OQS-5 hull sonar; OQR-2 TASS
- Electronic warfare & decoys: NOLQ-3 suite; Mk. 36 SRBOC Chaff and Decoy Launching System; AN/SLQ-25 torpedo decoys
- Armament: 1 × OTO Melara 76 mm gun; 2 × 20 mm Phalanx CIWS; 8 × SSM-1B Anti-ship missile in quad canisters; 2 × triple 324 mm torpedo tubes; 16-cell Mk. 48 VLS with Evolved Sea Sparrow SAM; 16-cell Mk. 41 VLS with VL-ASROC
- Aircraft carried: 1 × SH-60J/K anti-submarine helicopter

JS Inazuma (DD-105) is the fifth ship of Murasame-class destroyers. She was commissioned on 15 March 2000.

== Design ==
The hull design was completely renovated from first-generation destroyers. In addition to increasing the size in order to reduce the underwater radiation noise, both the superstructure and hull were inclined to reduce the radar cross-section. However, there is no angled tripod mainmast like that of the American Arleigh Burke-class destroyer because of the heavy weather of the Sea of Japan in winter. The aft was designed like a "mini-Oranda-zaka" as with the Kongō class to avoid interference between helicopters and mooring devices. Destroyers built under the First Defense Build-up Plan, including the former Murasame class, adopted a unique long forecastle style called "Oranda-zaka".

The engine arrangement is COGAG as same as Asagiri class, but a pair of engines were updated to Spey SM1C. The remaining one pair were replaced by LM2500, same as in the Kongō class.

== Construction and career ==
Inazuma was laid down on 8 May 1997 by Mitsubishi Heavy Industries at Nagasaki as part of the 1995 plan and launched on 9 September 1998. Commissioned on 15 March 2000, the destroyer was incorporated into the 4th Escort Corps and deployed to Kure.

From 26 August to 30 October 2018, Inazuma participated in the Indo-Pacific dispatch training with the escort vessels JS Kaga and JS Suzutsuki, and visited India, Indonesia, Singapore, Sri Lanka, Sri Lanka, and the Philippines. On 13 September, she joined the submarine JS Kuroshio in the South China Sea and conducted anti-submarine warfare training. On 26 September, a joint training between Japan and the United Kingdom was conducted with HMS Argyll heading for the South China Sea with Kaga in the sea and airspace west of Sumatra.

On 21 May 2019, she departed for the "Reiwa first year pelagic practice voyage" with the training ship JS Kashima. The vessels visited 13 ports in 11 countries in 157 days with about 580 people, including about 190 people who completed the 69th General Executive Candidate Course (including 1 ensign of the Royal Thai Navy), in Yokosuka on 24 October.

Inazuma left Innoshima, Onomichi in the morning of 10 January 2023 for sea acceptance trial after undergoing routine maintenance at Japan Marine United shipyard in Innoshima. While underway at approximately 31 knots (57 km/h; 36 mph) in Seto Inland Sea, approximately one mile south of commercial shipping lane, the ship hit an underwater rock off Suō-Ōshima, Yamaguchi Prefecture. The incident caused an oil spill and disabled Inazuma's propulsion and steering. The destroyer then dropped anchor at its current position. The sailors aboard Inazuma threw absorbent pads from the stern to sop up the leaked oil, which stretched up to 100 feet (30 m) behind the ship and covered an area of approximately 10,000 square feet at the day of incident. On 15 January at 08:00, Inazuma was towed by two tugboats from its anchorage and arrived off the coast of Innoshima at 17:00. The ship was scheduled to enter Innoshima shipyard on the next day.

== Gallery ==
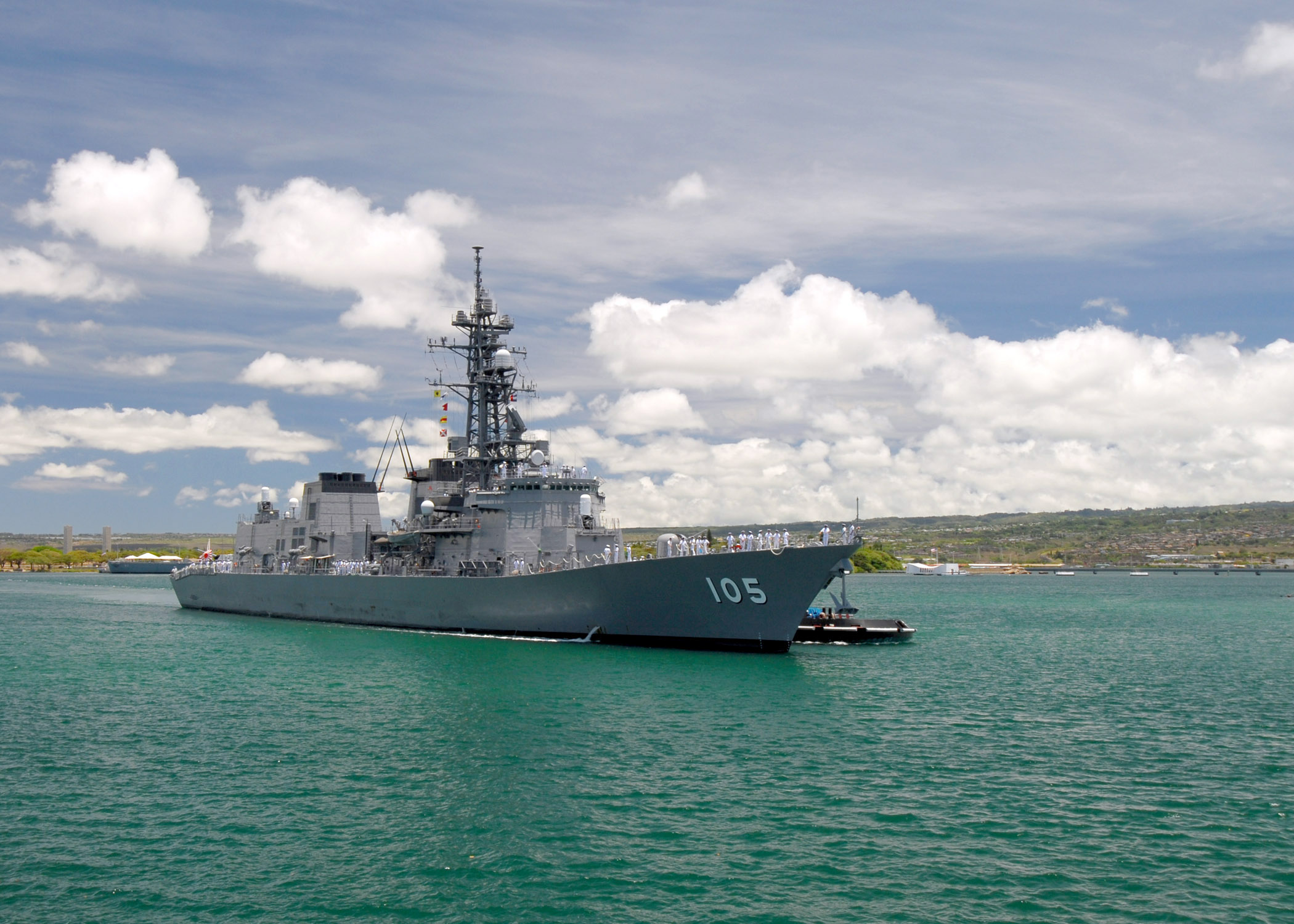
Inazumi passes by USS Arizona Memorial in Pearl Harbor on 29 May 2007.

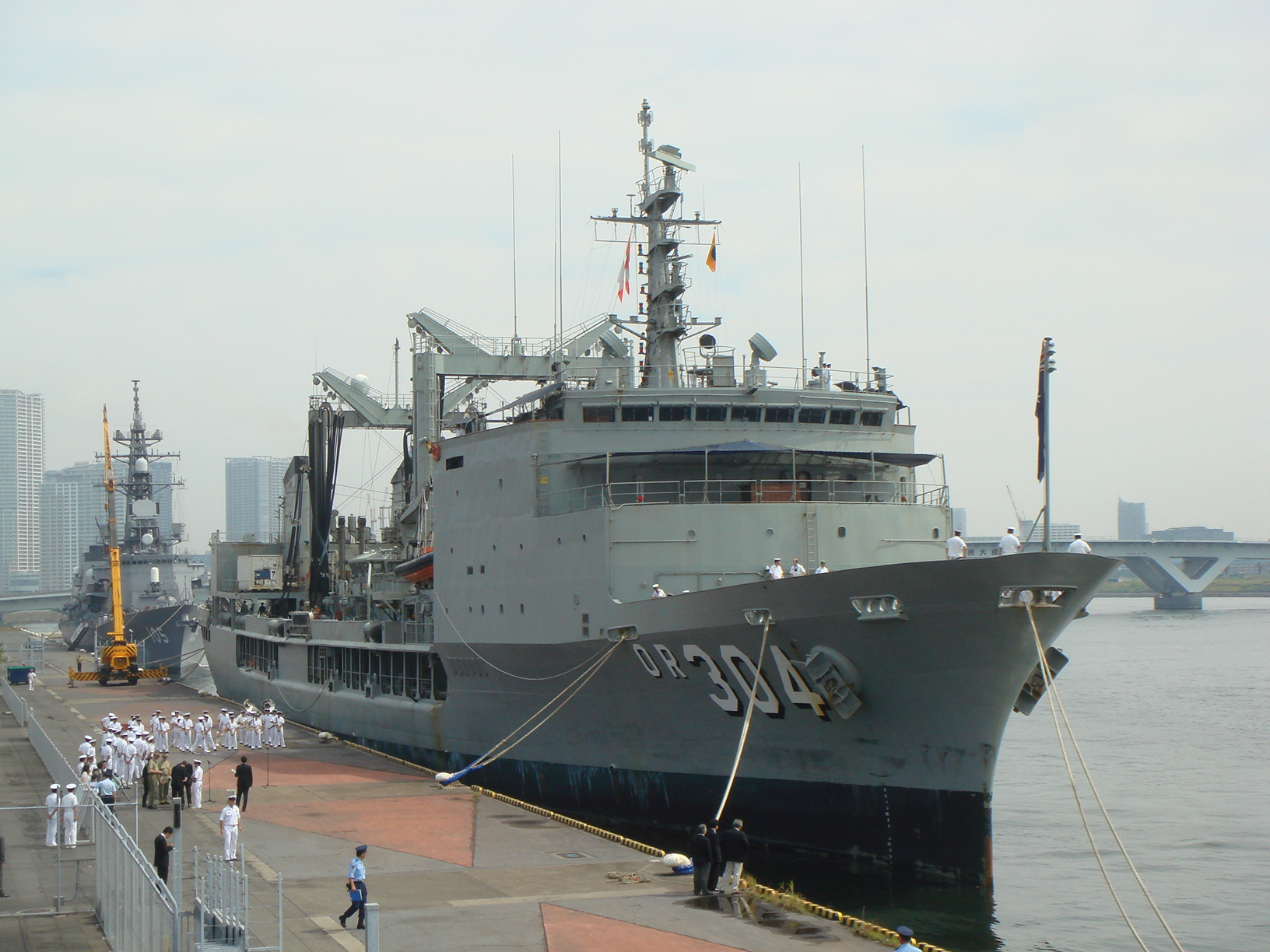
Inazuma moored behind HMAS Success at Harumi on 13 September 2009.

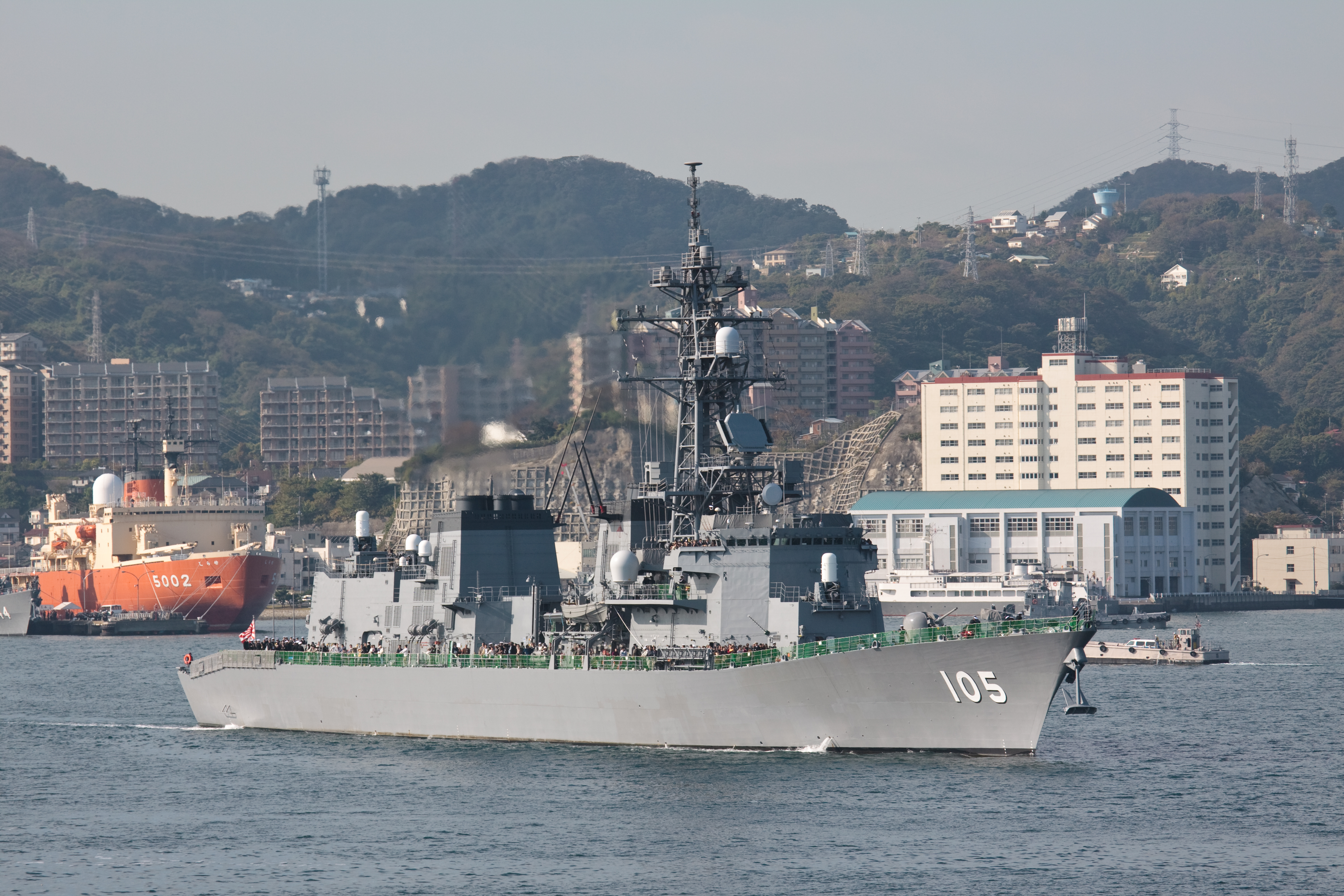
Inazuma departing Yokouska on 21 October 2009.

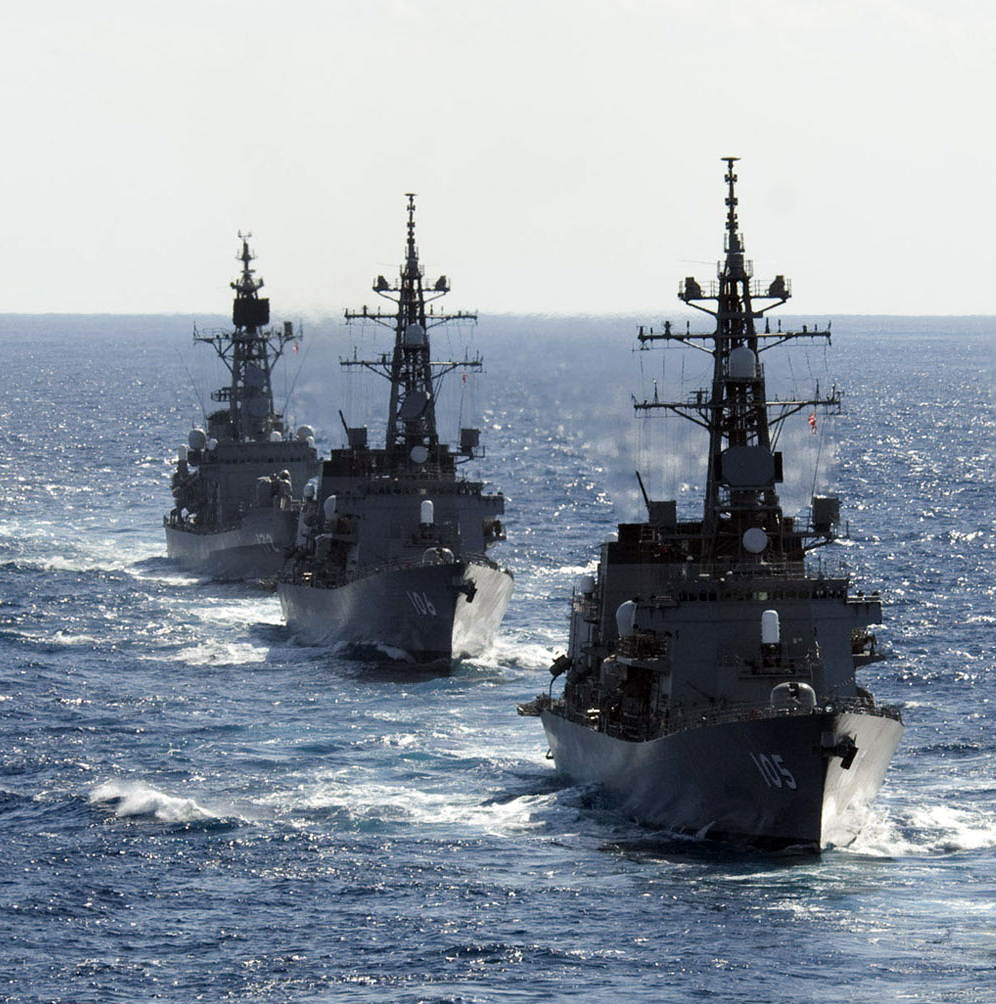
JS Inazuma, JS Samidare and JS Shimakaze steam in formation as part of a photo exercise on the final day of Keen Sword 2011 in the Pacific Ocean, 10 December, 2010

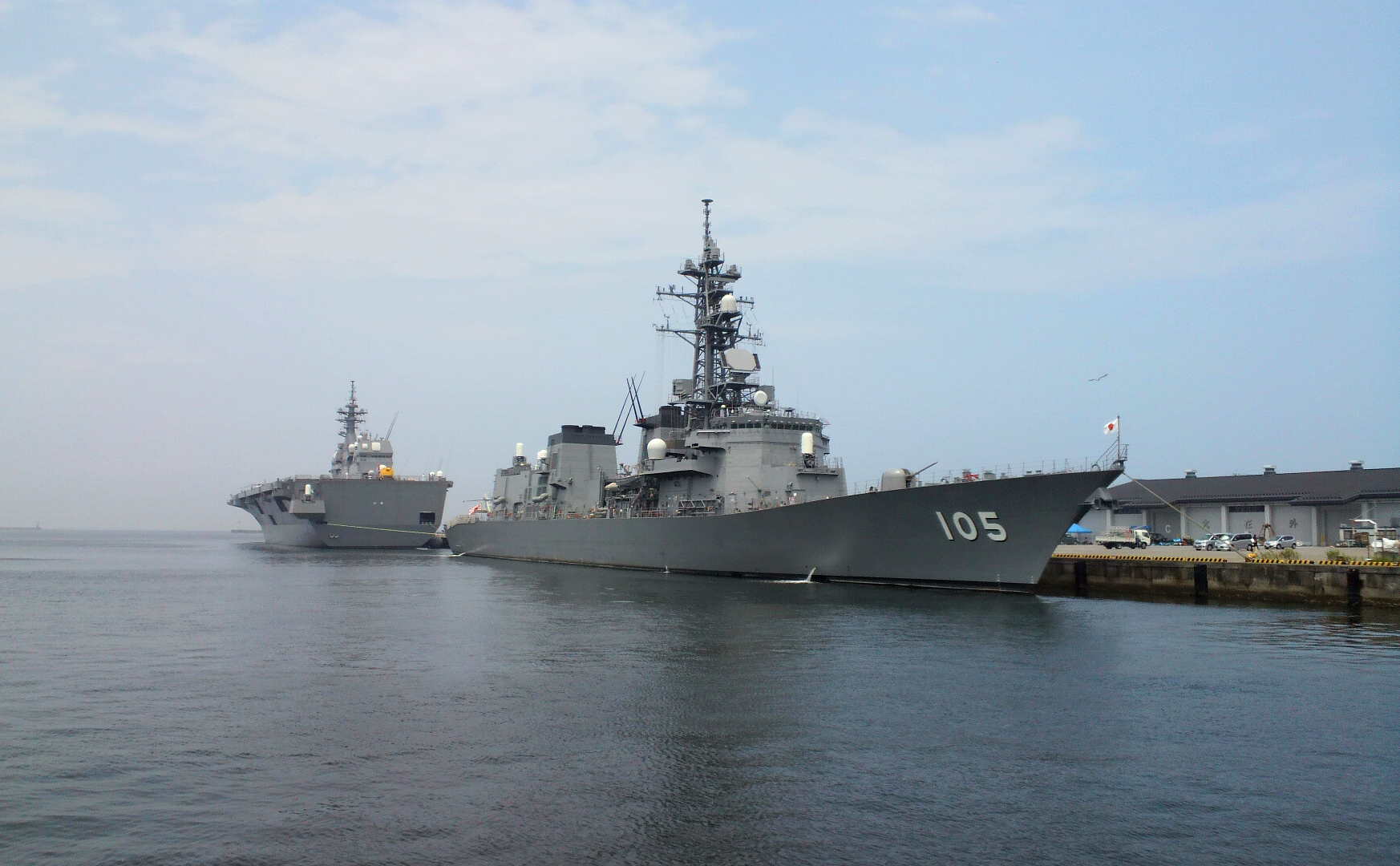
Inazuma and JS Ise at Ōita on 22 July 2012.

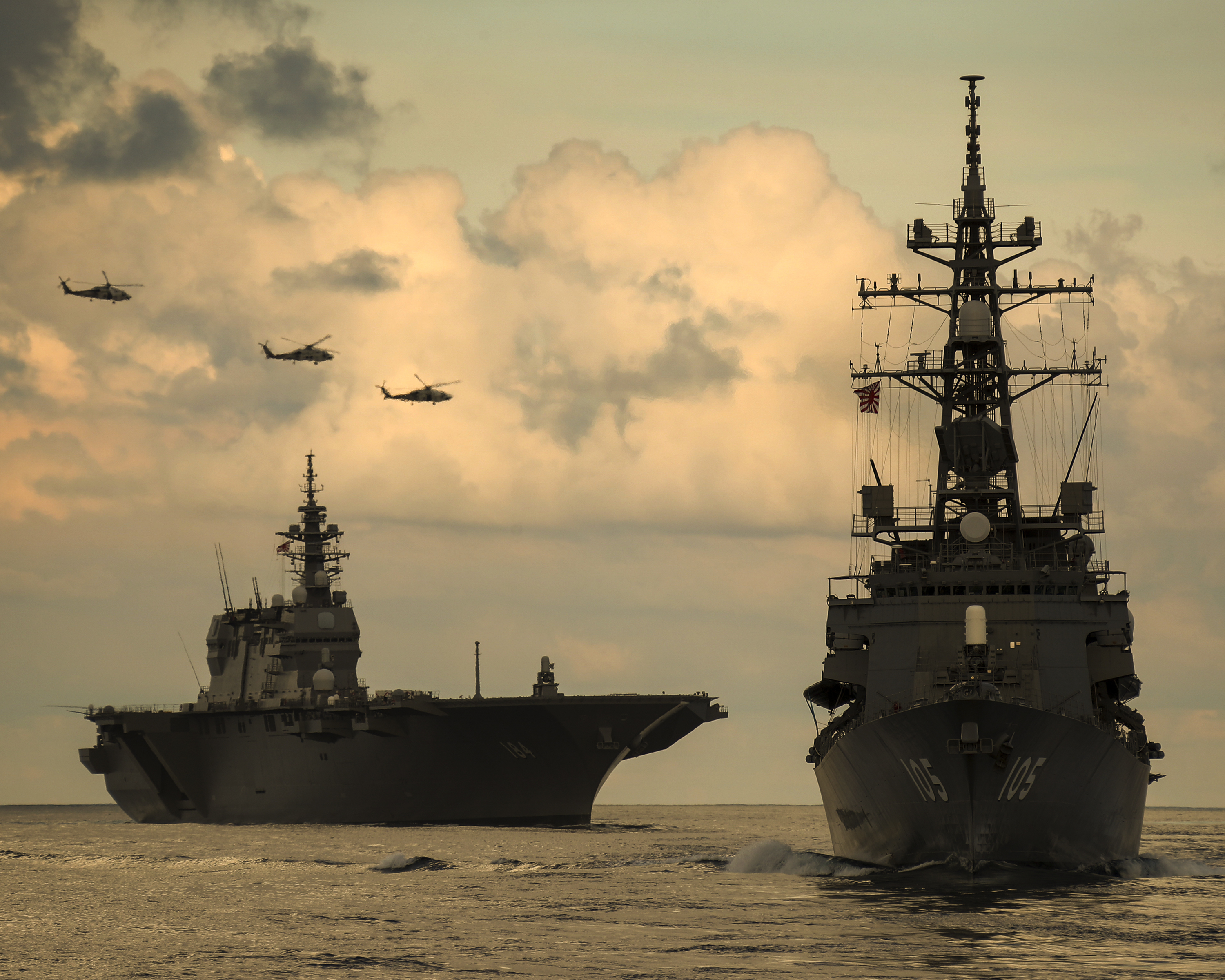
Inazuma and JS Kaga on 26 September 2018.

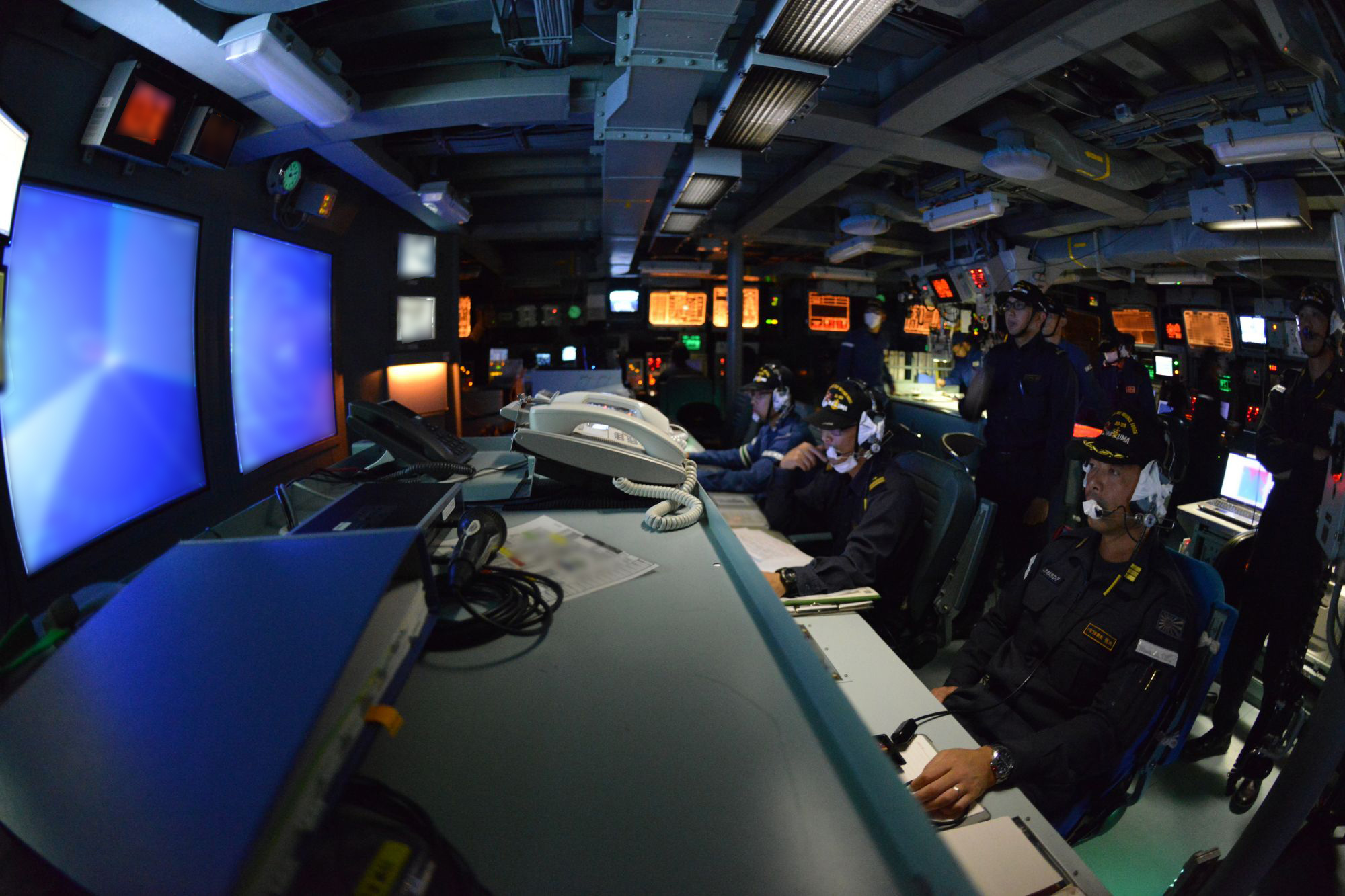
Command Information Center (CIC) on Inazuma on 29 September 2018.

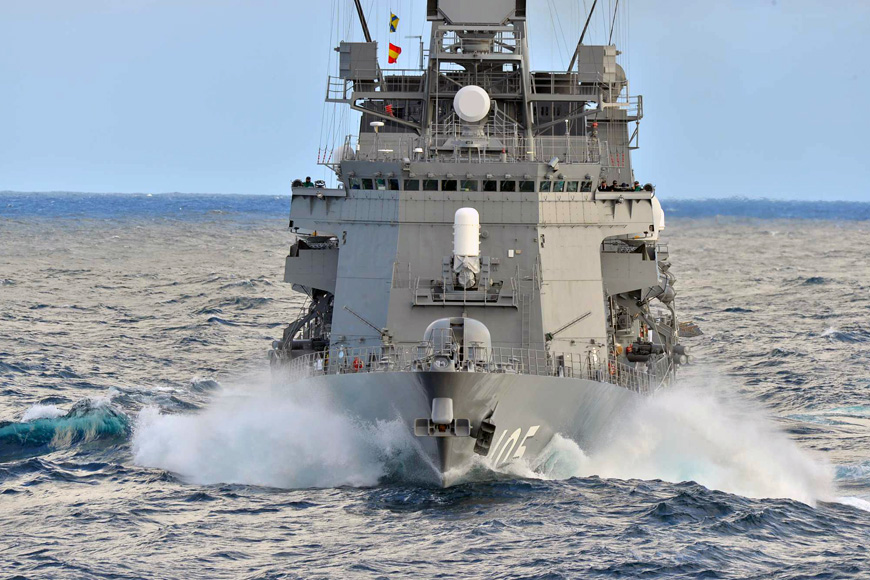
Inazuma underway on 26 July 2019.

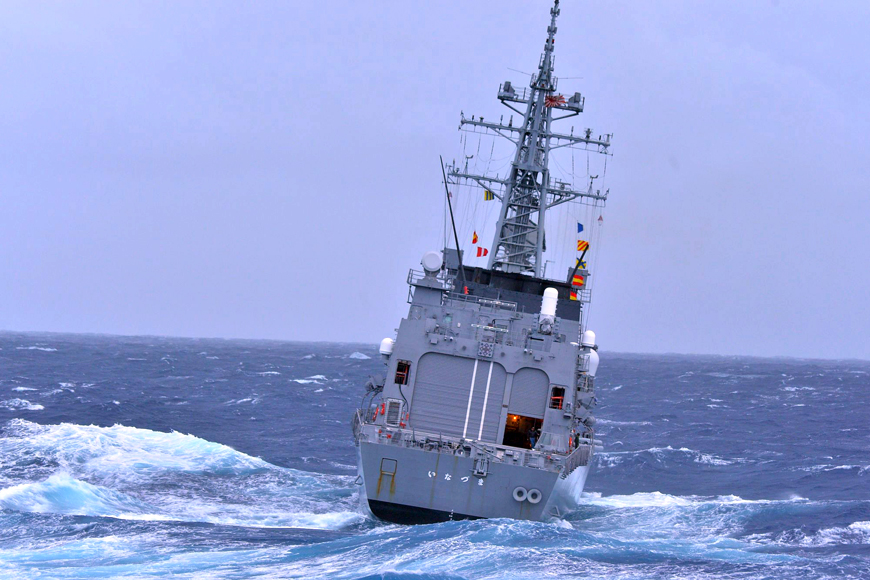
Inazuma underway on 27 September 2019.

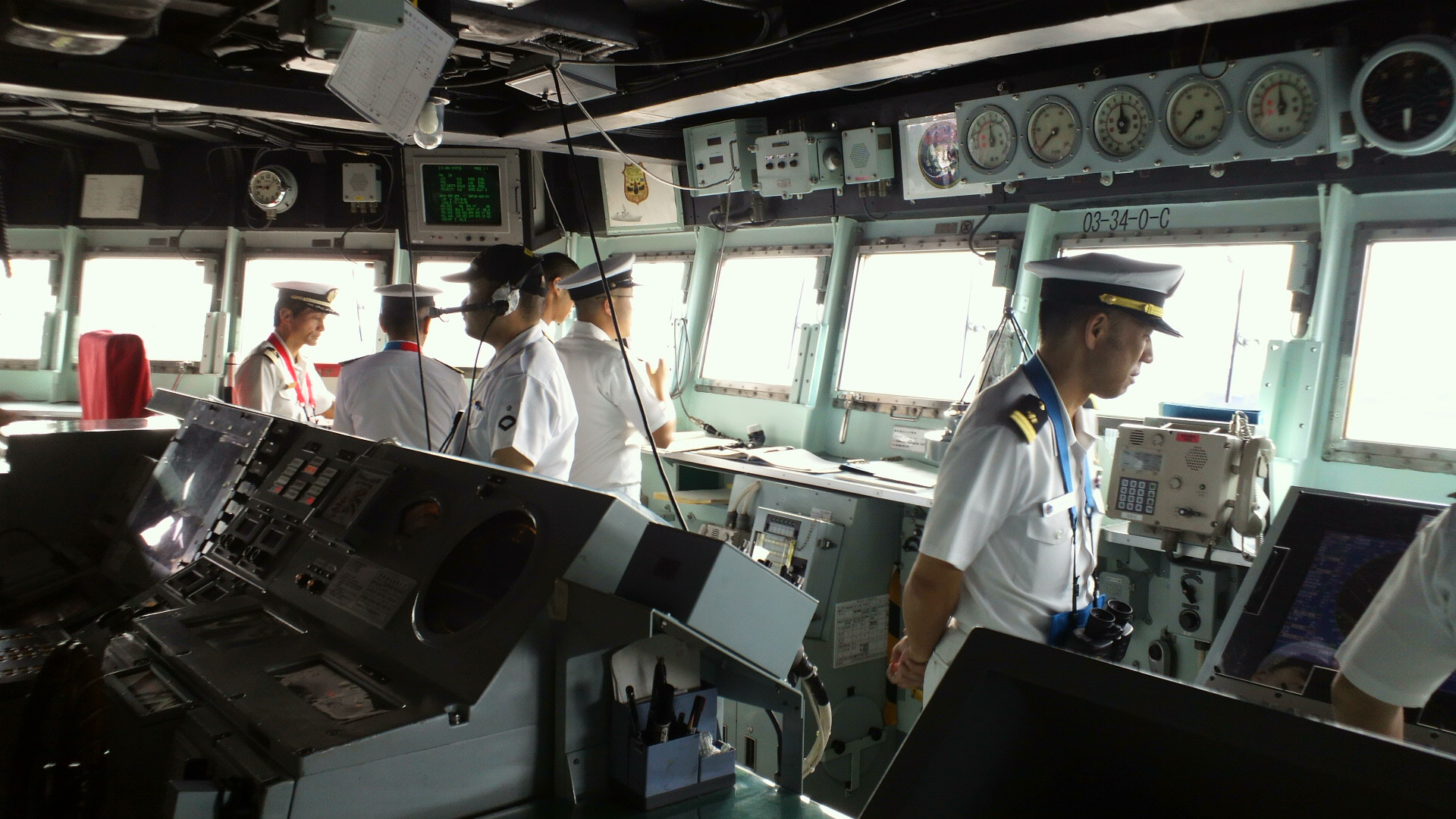
Inazuma's bridge on 22 July 2020.

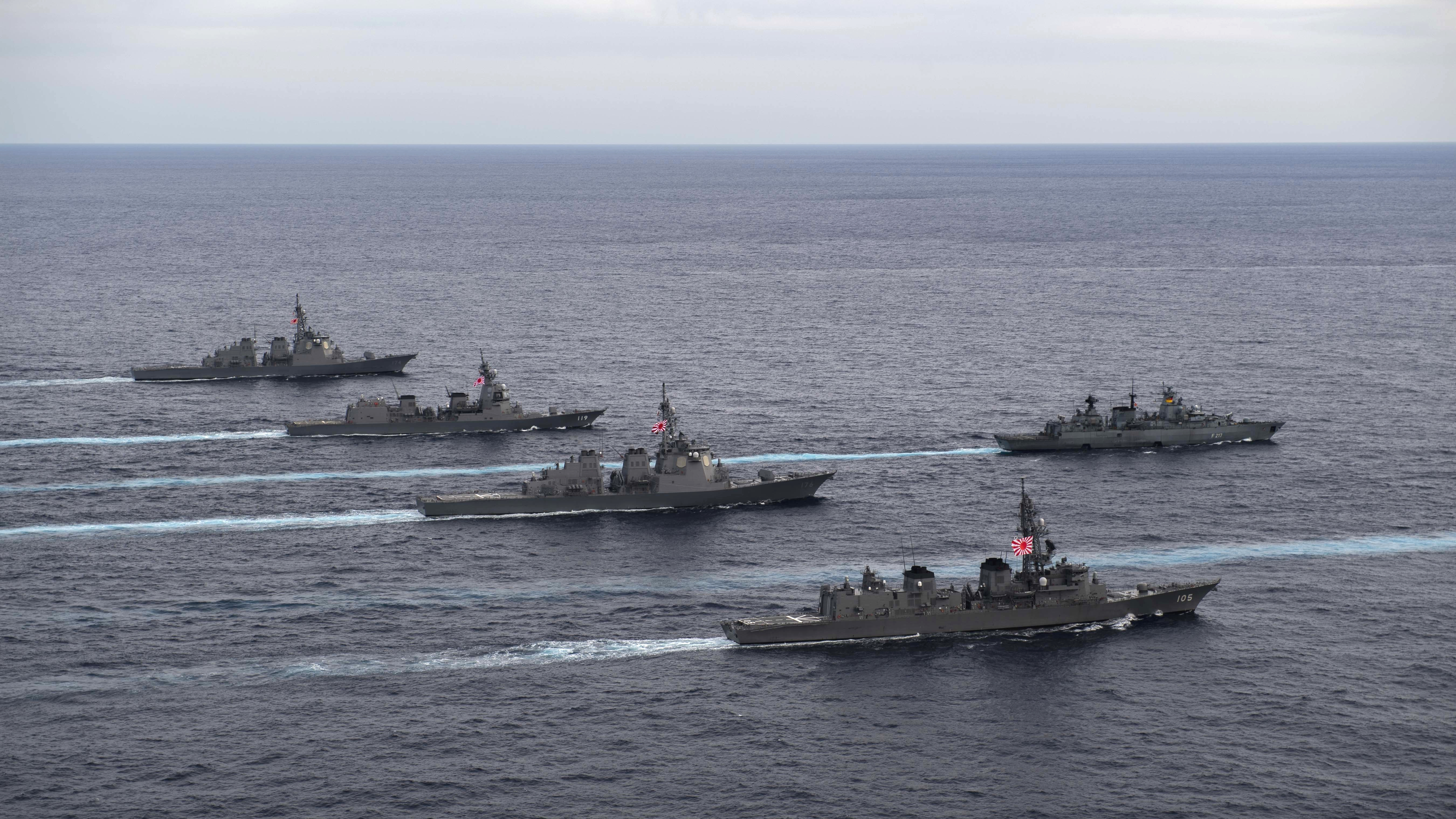
JS Inazuma sails with JS Kirishima, JS Asahi, and JS Chokai with German Navy frigate Bayern leading the way, 21 November 2021.
