= JS Suzutsuki =

Destroyer of the Japan Maritime Self-Defense Force

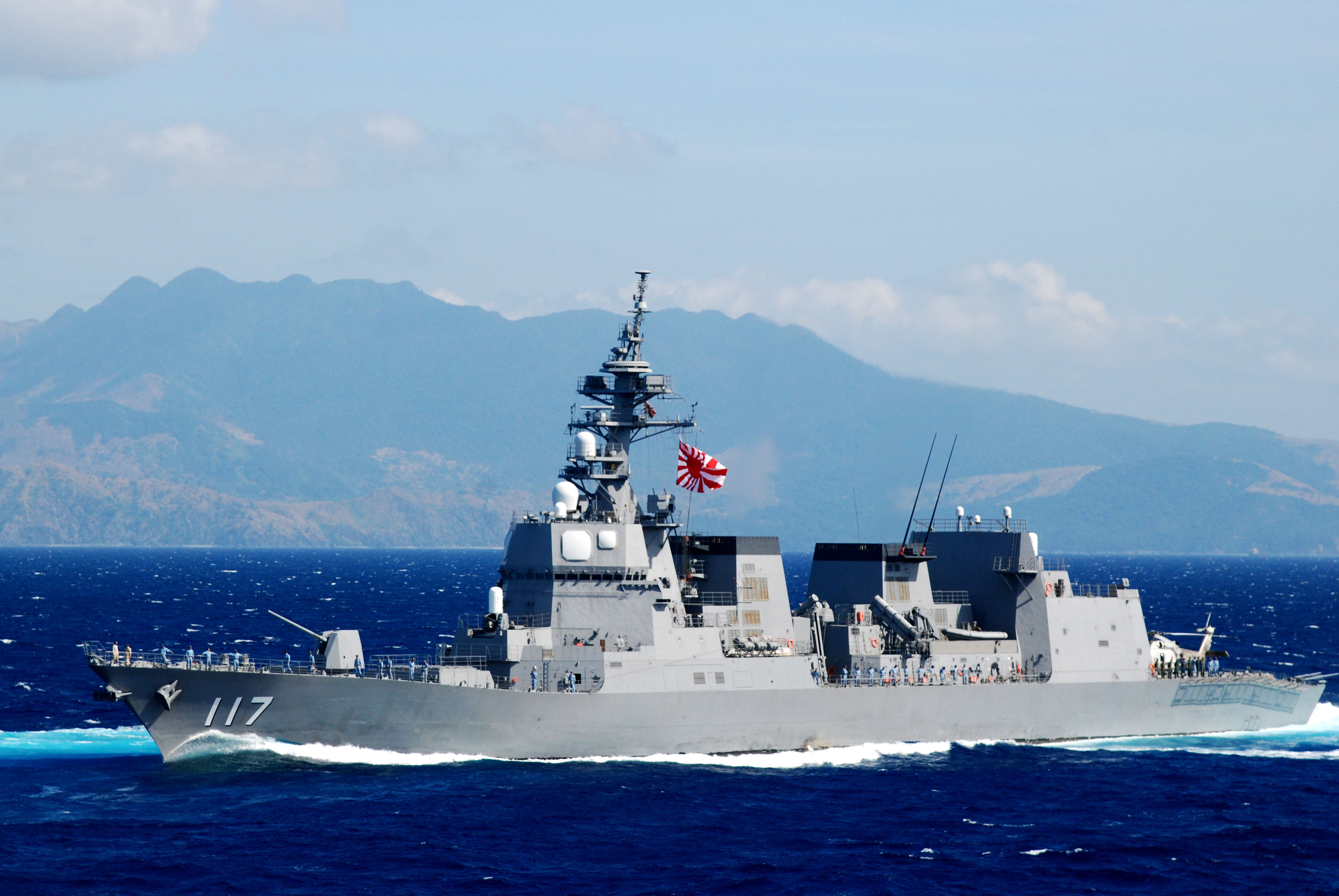
- JS Suzutsuki in January 2017

History

Japan
- Name: Suzutsuki; (すずつき)
- Namesake: Suzutsuki (1942)
- Ordered: 2009
- Builder: Mitsubishi, Nagasaki
- Laid down: 18 May 2011
- Launched: 17 October 2012
- Commissioned: 12 March 2014
- Home port: Sasebo
- Identification: DD-117
- Status: Active

General characteristics
- Class & type: Akizuki-class destroyer
- Displacement: 5,000 tonnes standard; 6,800 tonnes full load
- Length: 150.5 m (493 ft 9 in)
- Beam: 18.3 m (60 ft 0 in)
- Draft: 5.3 m (17 ft 5 in)
- Depth: 10.9 m (35 ft 9 in)
- Propulsion: COGAG, two shafts, four Rolls-Royce Spey SM1C turbines
- Speed: 30 knots (56 km/h; 35 mph)
- Complement: 200
- Sensors & processing systems: ATECS (advanced technology command system); OYQ-11 ACDS; FCS-3A AAW system; OQQ-22 ASW system; NOLQ-3D EW system; OPS-20C surface search radar
- Armament: 1 × Mk. 45 Mod 4 127 mm (5 in)/54 gun; 8 × Type 90 Anti-ship missile; 2 × 20 mm Phalanx Block1B CIWS; 2 × HOS-303 triple 324 mm (12.8 in) torpedo tubes; Anti-Torpedo system; 32-cell Mk. 41 Vertical Launching System: RIM-162 ESSM SAM; RUM-139 VL-ASROC (DD 115); Type 07 VL-ASROC (DD 116 to DD 118)
- Aircraft carried: 1 × SH-60K helicopter

JS Suzutsuki (DD-117) is the third ship of Akizuki-class destroyers, operated by the Japan Maritime Self-Defense Force. She was commissioned on 12 March 2014.

== Construction and career ==
Suzutsuki was laid down on May 18, 2011 at Mitsubishi Heavy Industries Nagasaki Shipyard & Machinery Works as the 2009 plan 5,000-ton type escort ship No. 2246 based on the medium-term defense capability development plan, and launched on October 17, 2012. Commissioned on March 12, 2014, it was incorporated into the 8th Escort Corps of the 4th Escort Corps and deployed to Sasebo.

On July 10, 2016, as part of the 25th dispatched anti-piracy action surface corps, it sailed from Sasebo base to the Gulf of Aden off the coast of Somalia with the escort ship JS Inazuma and returned to Japan on January 12, 2016.

From October 13 to November 25, 2017, she was dispatched to the waters around Hawaii and participated in the US dispatch training.

From August 26 to October 30, 2018, participated in the Indo-Pacific dispatch training with the escort vessels JS Kaga and JS Inazuma, and visited India, Indonesia, Singapore, Sri Lanka and Philippines. On September 13, she joined the submarine JS Kuroshio in the South China Sea and conducted anti-submarine warfare training.

On April 21, 2019, she entered Qingdao to participate in the International Fleet Review Ceremony to be held on April 23 near Qingdao, Shandong Province, to commemorate the 70th anniversary of the PLA Navy. It had been about seven and a half years since the last JMSDF ship visited China in December 2011.

From August 15 to 17, 2020, Japan-US joint training was conducted with the US Navy destroyer USS Mustin in the East China Sea.

On July 4, 2024, without notifying the Chinese government, Suzutsuki briefly entered Chinese territorial waters about 22 kilometers off the coast of Zhejiang Province. At the time, the Chinese Navy was conducting military exercises. After being warned multiple times by the broadcasts of the Chinese People's Liberation Army Navy and two warnings of shelling, Suzutsuki was finally driven away. The Ministry of Foreign Affairs made "solemn representations" to Japan and asked for an explanation. Japan responded at the time that it was a technical failure. On September 22, Japan responded that the captain had mistakenly entered Chinese territorial waters without knowing the location and had been replaced.

== Gallery ==
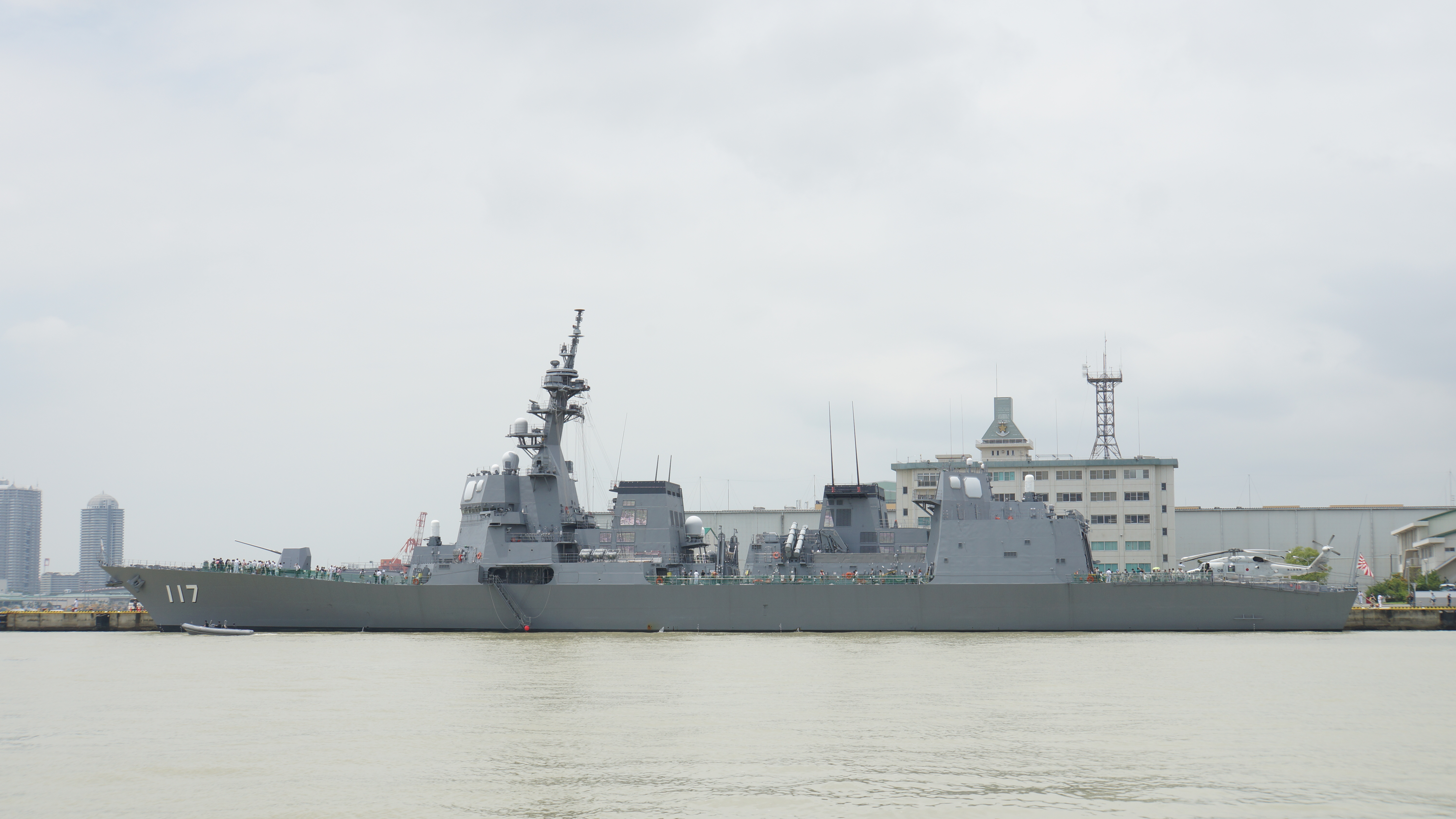
JS Suzutsuki at Hanshin Base, 18 July 2015

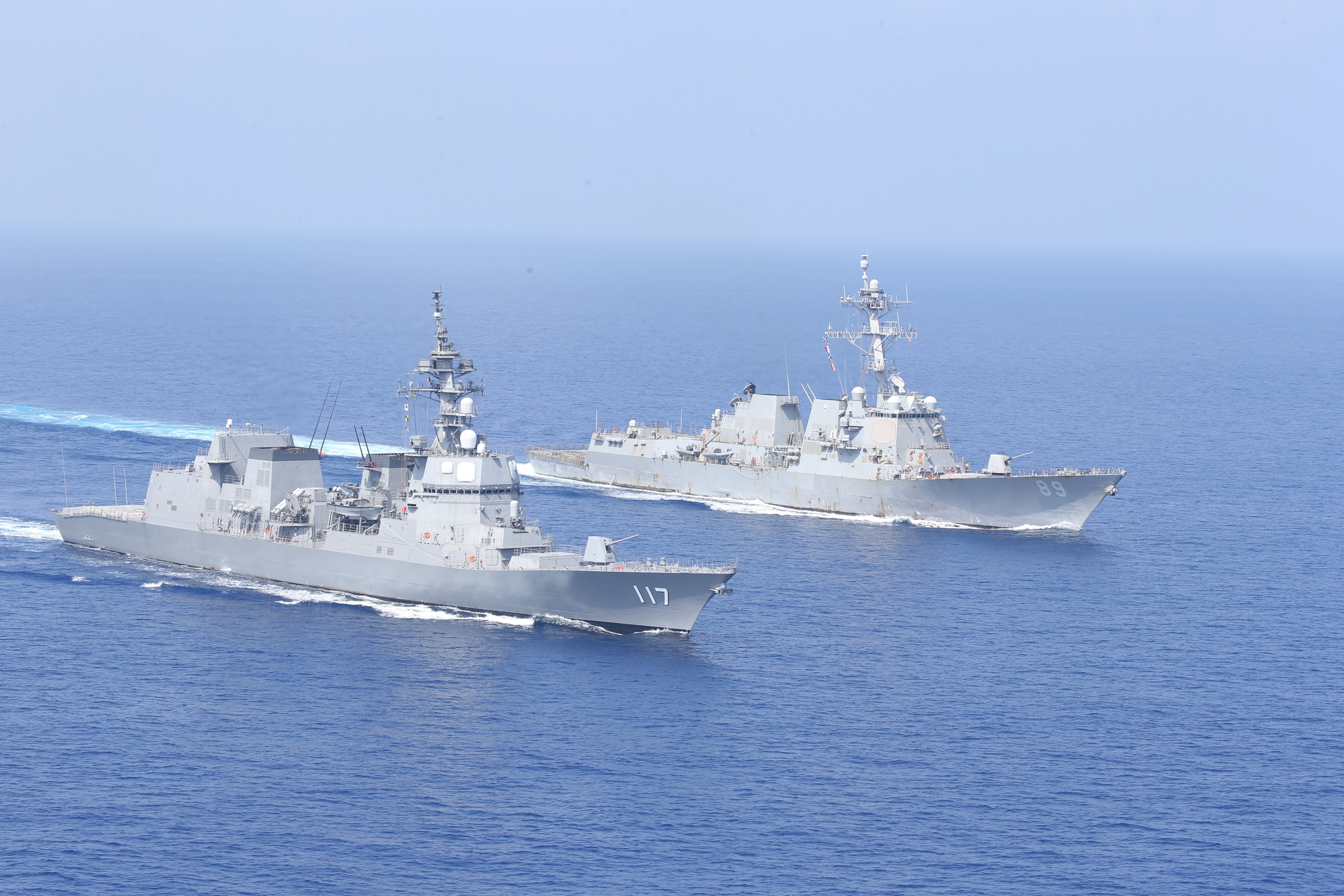
JS Suzutsuki sails with USS Mustin, 17 August 2020

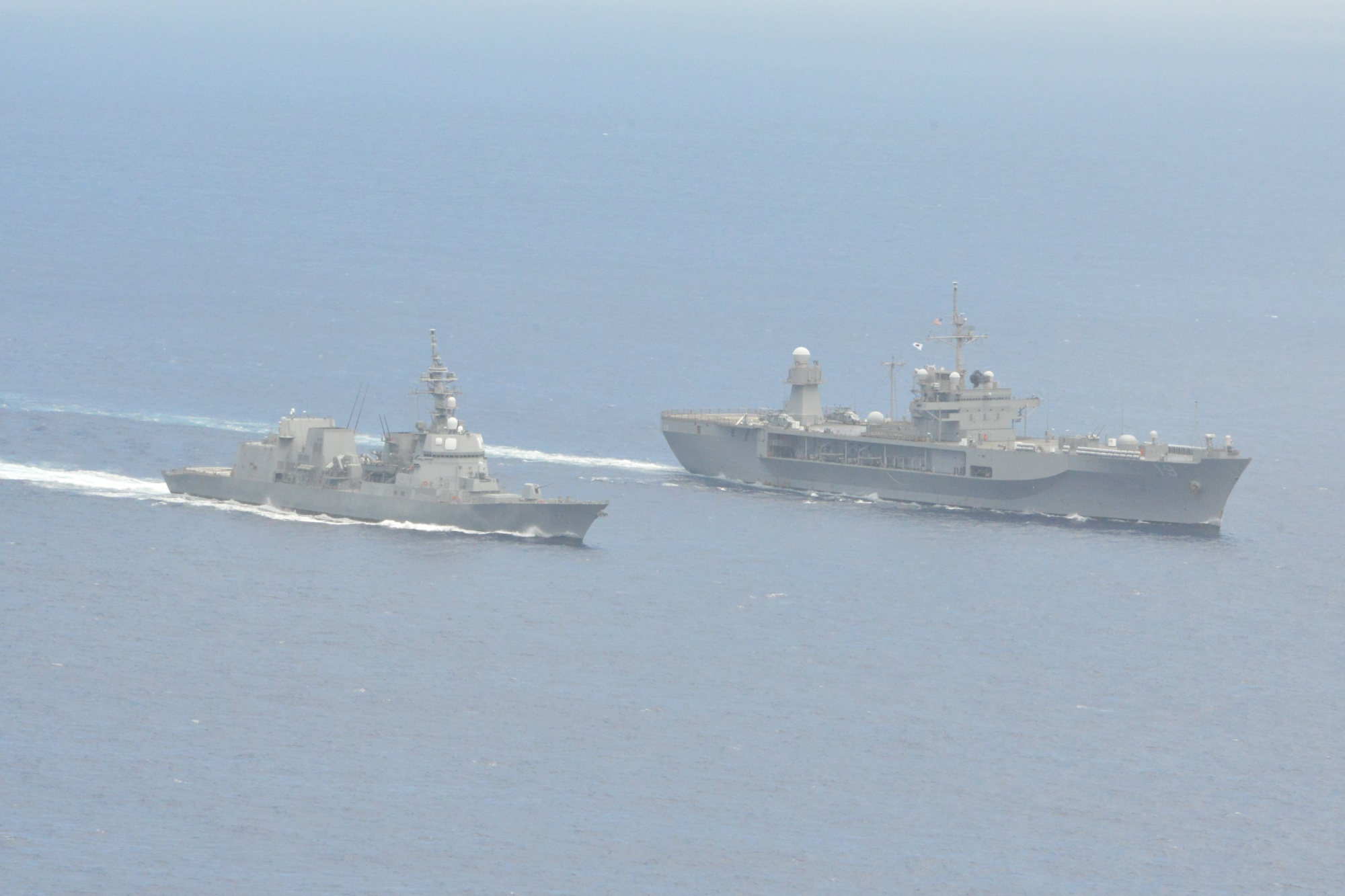
JS Suzutsuki sails with USS Blue Ridge, 11 July 2023
