= JS Hamagiri =

Asagiri-class destroyer

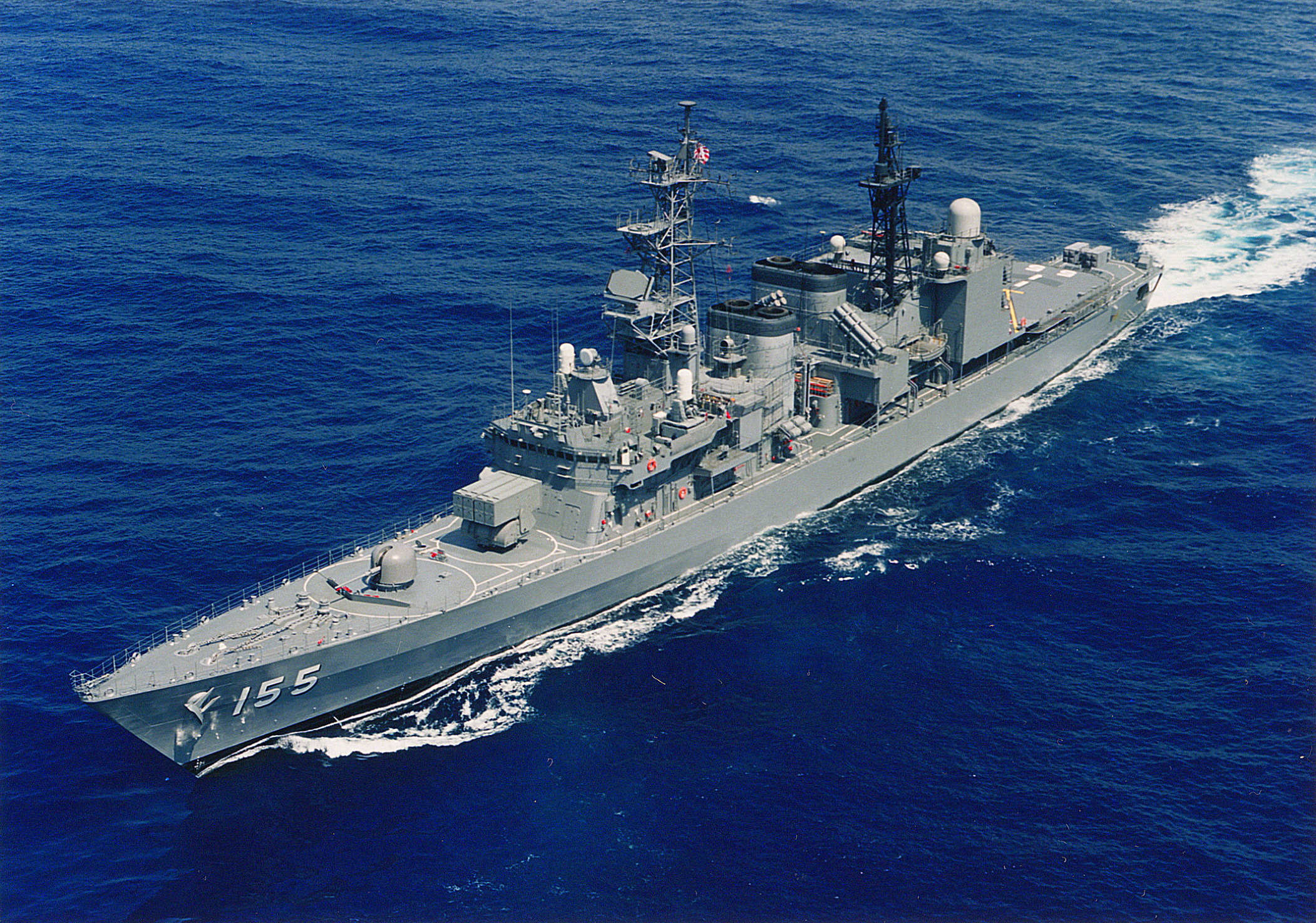
- JS Hamagiri

History

Japan
- Name: Hamagiri; (はまぎり)
- Ordered: 1985
- Builder: Hitachi, Maizuru
- Laid down: 20 January 1987
- Launched: 4 June 1988
- Commissioned: 31 January 1990
- Home port: Ominato
- Identification: MMSI number: 431999516; Pennant number: DD-155
- Status: Active

General characteristics
- Class & type: Asagiri-class destroyer
- Length: 137 m (449 ft 6 in)
- Beam: 14.6 m (47 ft 11 in)
- Draft: 4.5 m (14 ft 9 in)
- Propulsion: 4 gas turbines 54,000 shp (40,000 kW)
- Speed: 30 knots (56 km/h; 35 mph)
- Range: 8,030 nmi (14,870 km; 9,240 mi) at 14 knots (26 km/h; 16 mph)
- Complement: 220
- Sensors & processing systems: OYQ-6/7 CDS (w/ Link-11); OPS-14/24 air search radar; OPS-28 surface search radar; OQS-4A hull sonar; OQR-1 TACTASS
- Electronic warfare & decoys: NOLR-8 intercept; OLT-3 jammer; Mark 36 SRBOC
- Armament: 1 × Otobreda 76 mm gun; 2 × missile canister up to 8 Harpoon SSM; 2 × 20 mm Phalanx CIWS; 1 × Mk.29 Sea Sparrow SAM octuple launcher; 1 × Mk.16 ASROC anti-submarine rocket octuple launcher; 2 × HOS-302A triple 324 mm (12.8 in) torpedo tubes
- Aircraft carried: 1 SH-60J(K) anti-submarine helicopter

JS Hamagiri (DD-155) is an Asagiri-class destroyer of the Japan Maritime Self-Defense Force.

== Development and design ==
The Asagiri class is equipped for combat and interception missions, and is primarily armed with anti-ship weapons. They carry two Mk-141 Guided Missile Launching System (GMLS), which are anti-ship missile systems. The ship is also fitted to be used against submarines. They also carries the Mk-32 Surface Vessel Torpedo Tubes (SVTT), which can be used as an anti-submarine weapon. The ship has two of these systems abeam to starboard and to port. They are also fitted with an Oto-Melara 62-caliber gun to be used against sea and air targets.

They are 137 m (449 ft 6 in) long. The ship has a range of 8,000 nautical miles (15,000 km; 9,200 mi) at 14 knots (26 km/h; 16 mph) with a top speed of 30 knots (56 km/h; 35 mph). The ship can have up to 220 personnel on board. The ship is also fitted to accommodate for one aircraft. The ship's flight deck can be used to service a SH-60J9(K) Seahawk helicopter.

== Construction and career ==
Hamagiri was laid down on 20 January 1987 and launched on 4 June 1988 by Hitachi Zosen Corporation, Maizuru. She was commissioned on 31 January 1990.

The Hamagiri was deployed to Somalia alongside the Takanami to the Gulf of Aden on October 4, 2009 to take over anti-piracy operations from the Harusame and the Amagiri.

The vessel was dispatched to the Great East Japan Earthquake caused by the 2011 off the Pacific coast of Tōhoku Earthquake on 11 March 2011.

On 7 April 2013, as the 15th dispatched anti-piracy action surface corps, the destroyer sailed off the coast of Somalia with the escort ship JS Akebono, completed the mission, and returned to Ominato on 27 September 2013. On 26 and 28 October 2014, she participated in the Japan-Russia search and rescue joint training conducted in the port of Vladivostok, Russia and off the coast of Vladivostok.

From 20 to 25 November 2017, Hamagiri participated in the Japan-Russia search and rescue joint training conducted at Vladivostok Port and the surrounding waters with the Russian Navy destroyer Admiral Vinogradov.

== Gallery ==
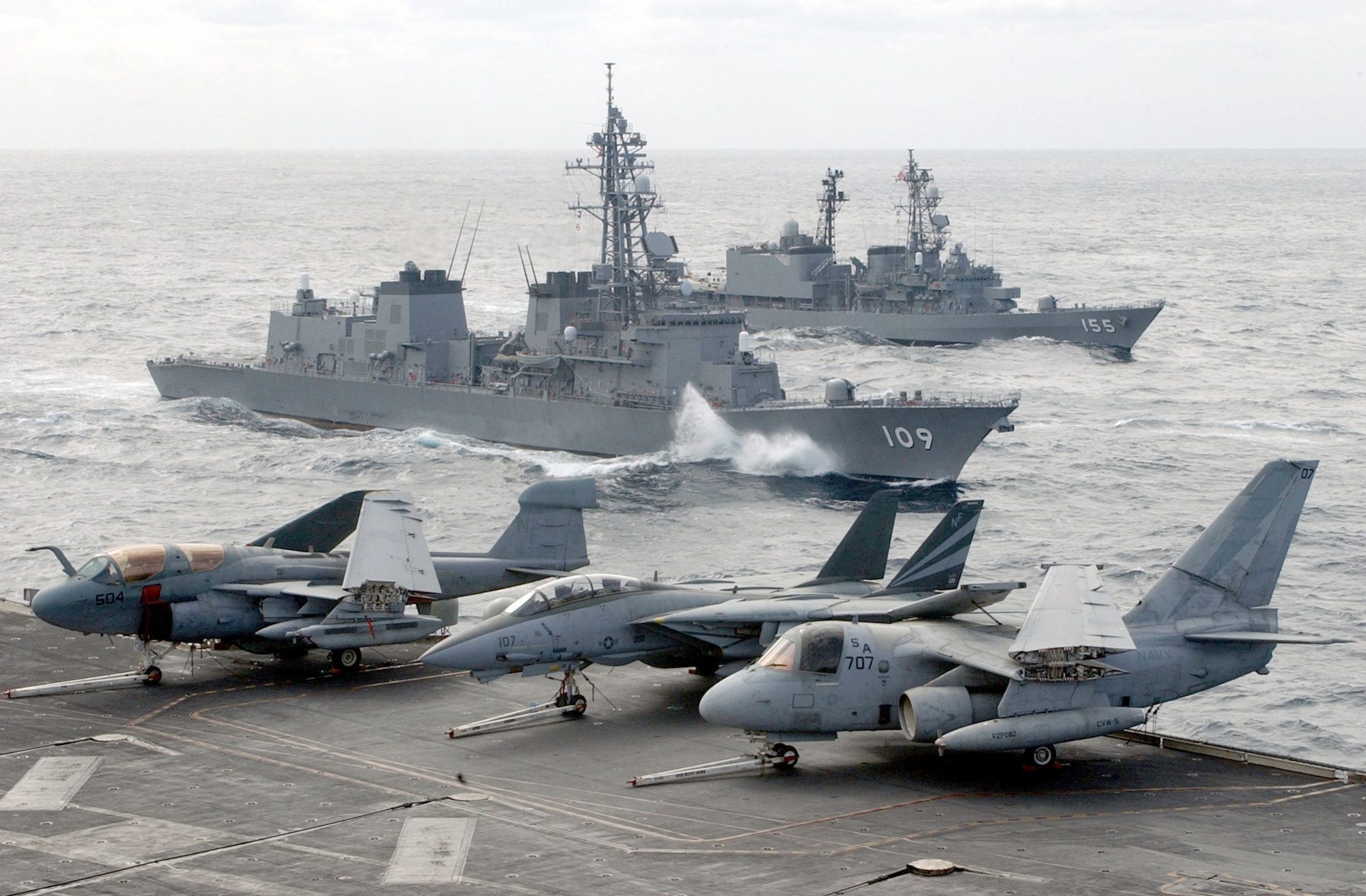
JS Hamagiri alongside USS Kitty Hawk and JS Ariake on 16 November 2002.

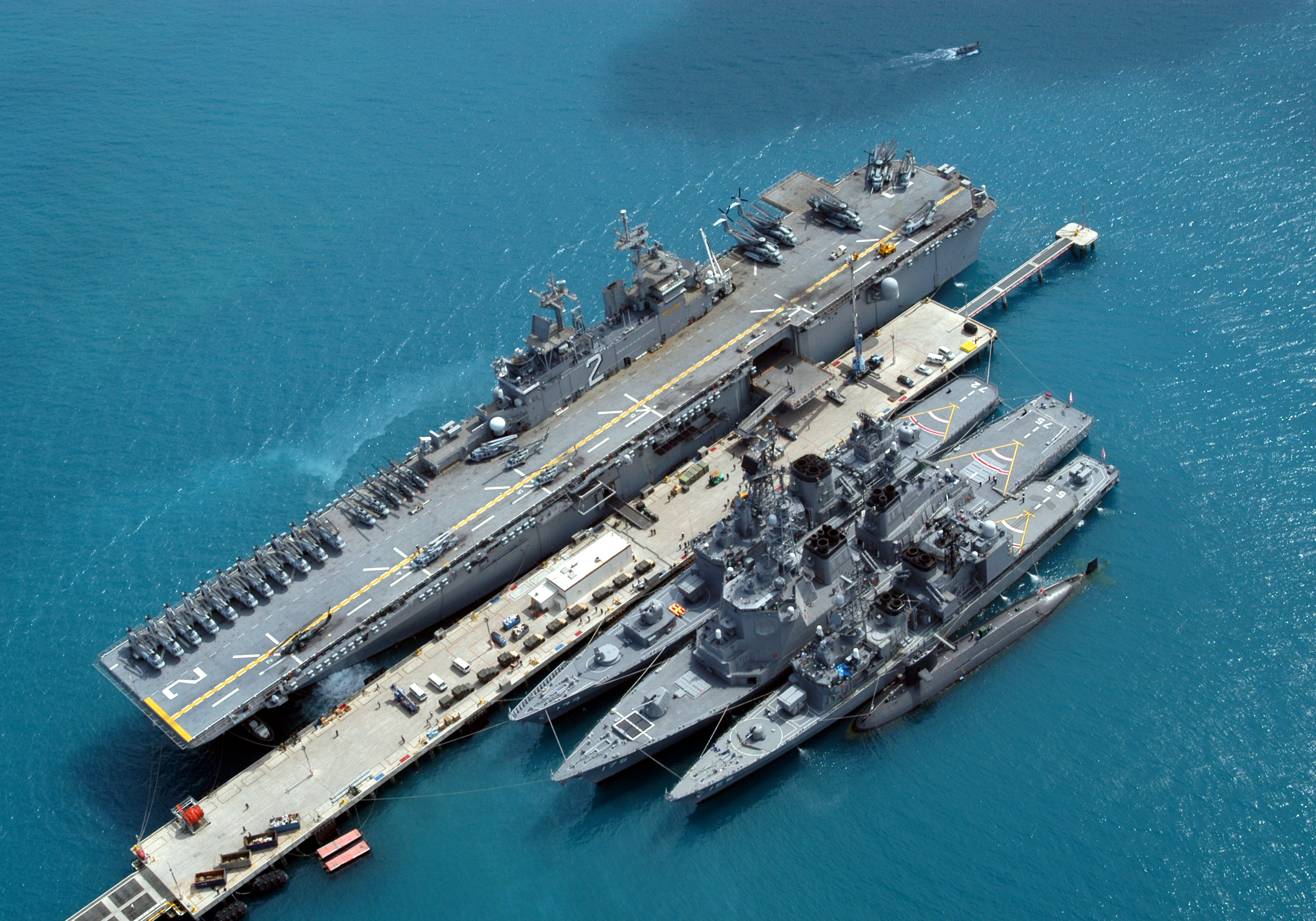
JS Hamagiri, USS Essex, JS Myōkō, JS Shimakaze and JS Natsushio at Okinawa on 28 February 2003.

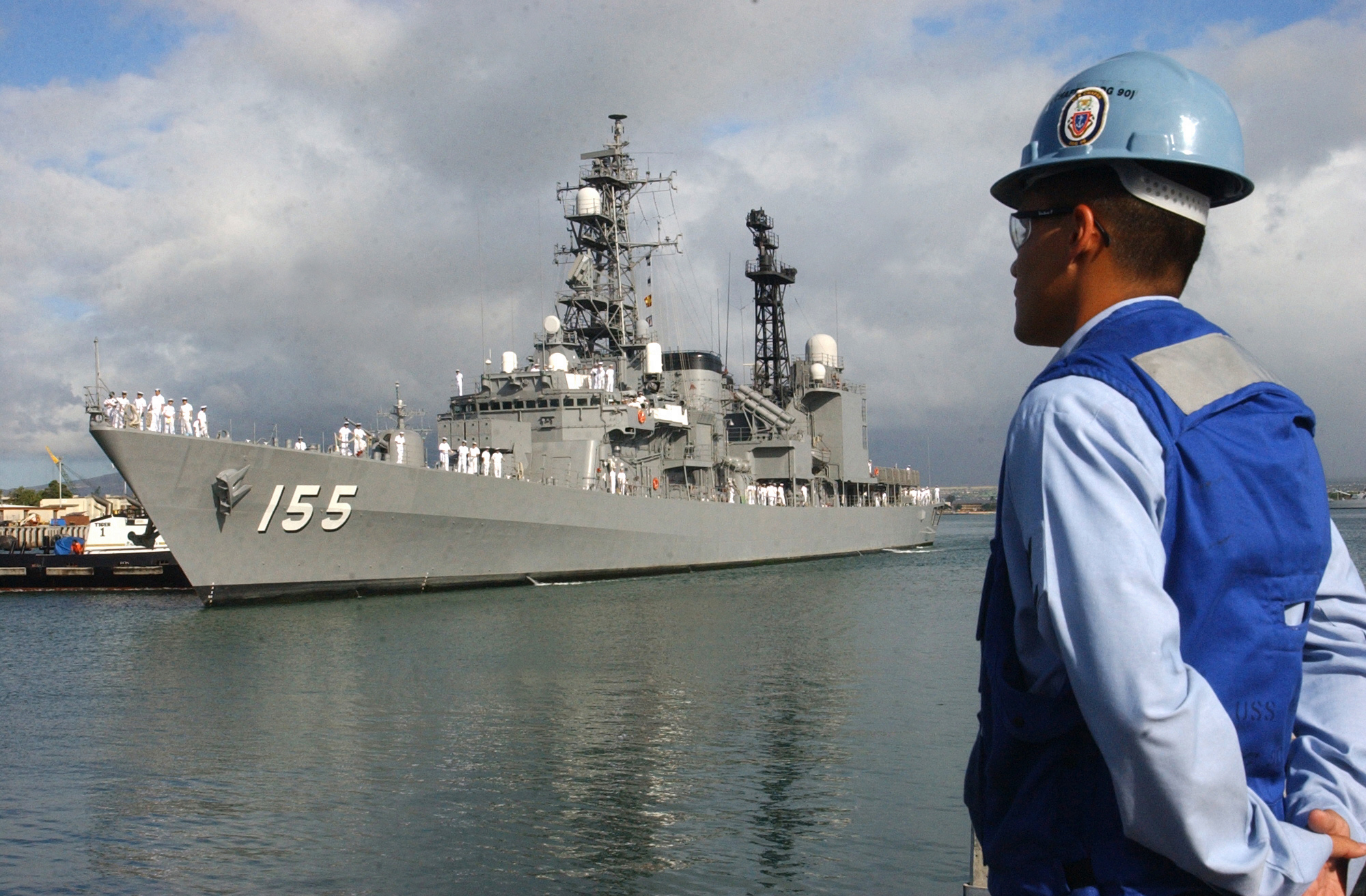
JS Hamagiri at Pearl Harbor on 4 May 2004.

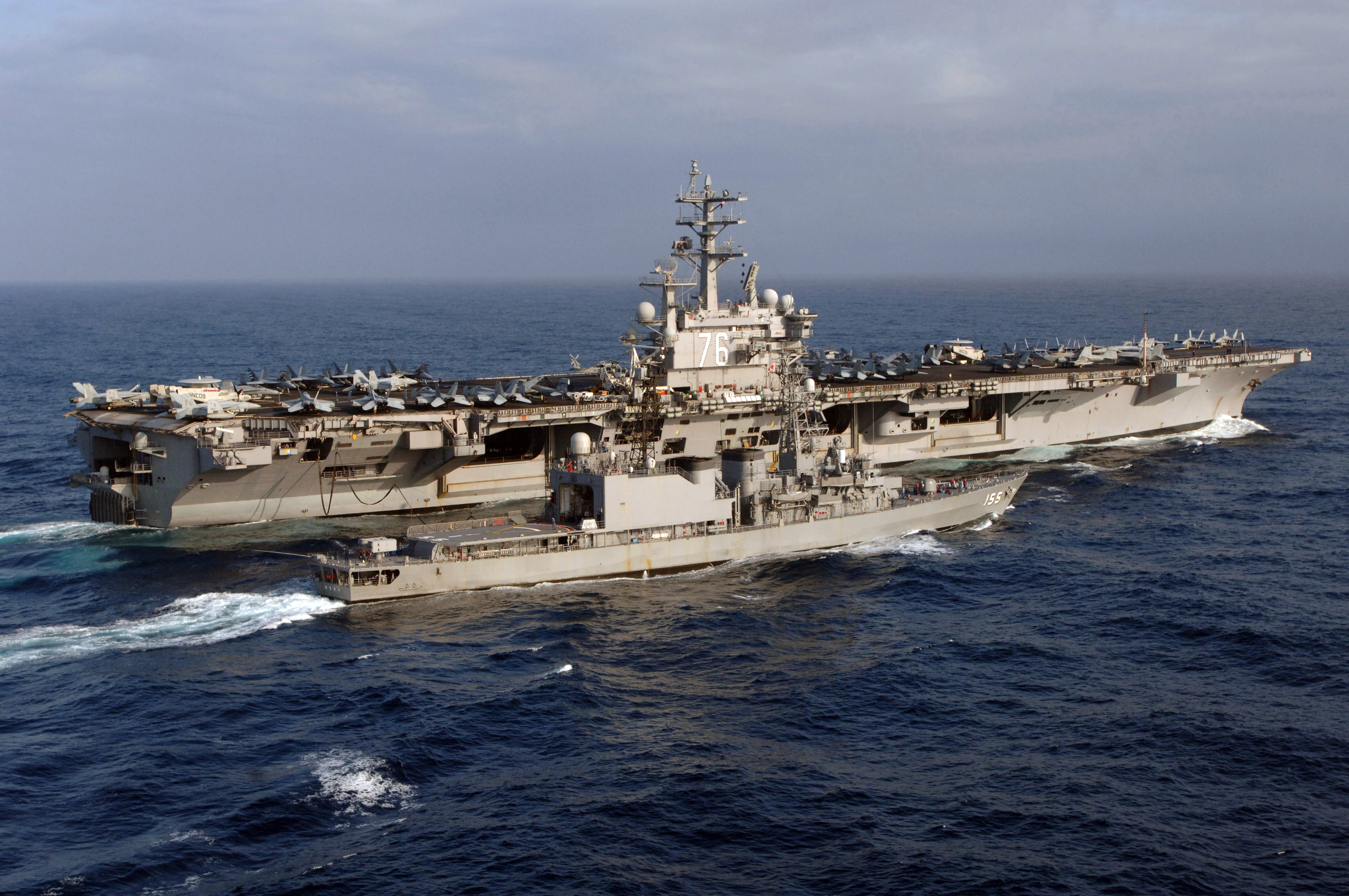
JS Hamagiri coming alongside USS Ronald Reagan on 17 March 2007.

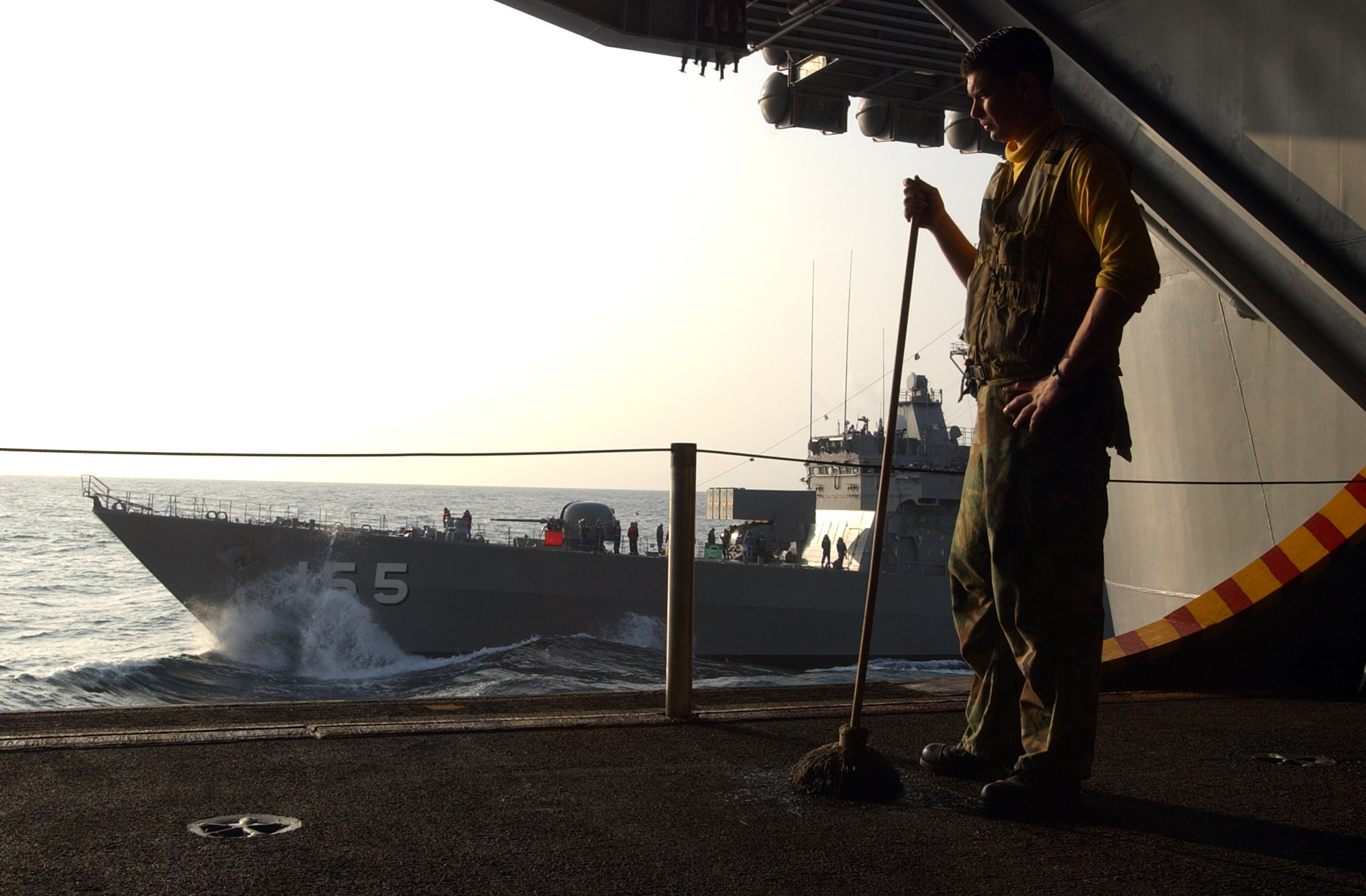
JS Hamagiri coming alongside USS Ronald Reagan on 17 March 2007.

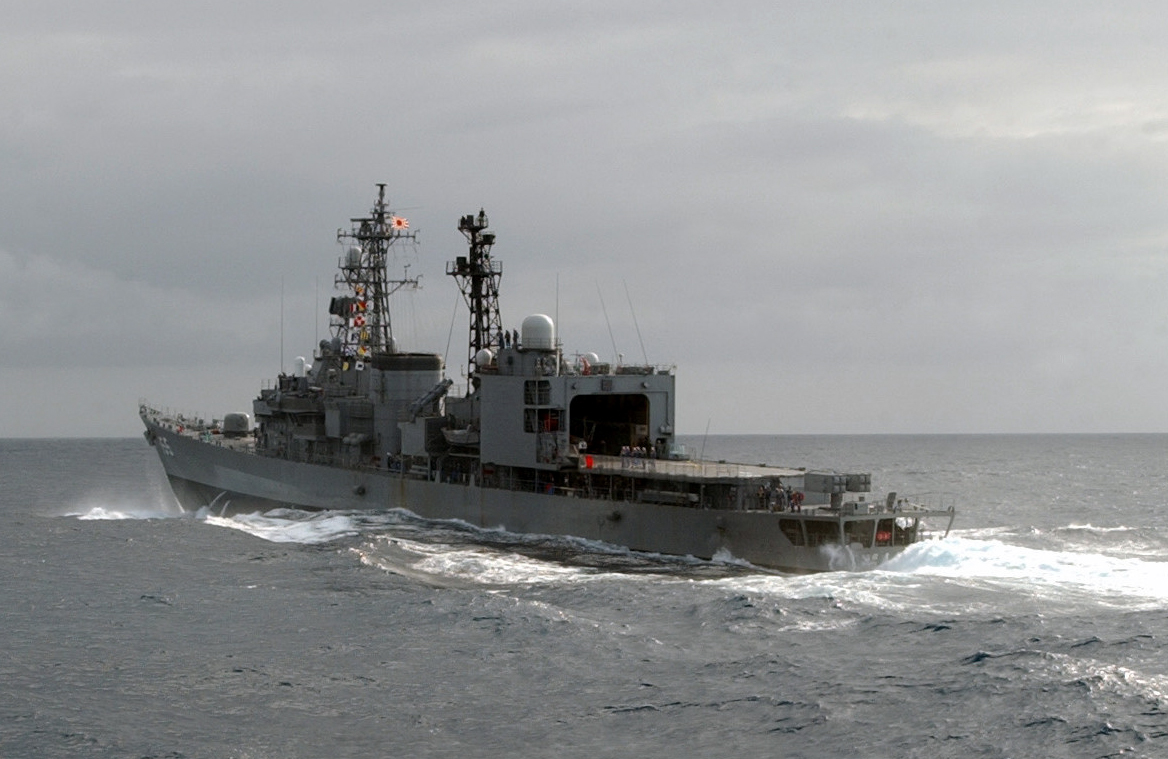
JS Hamagiri on 17 March 2007.

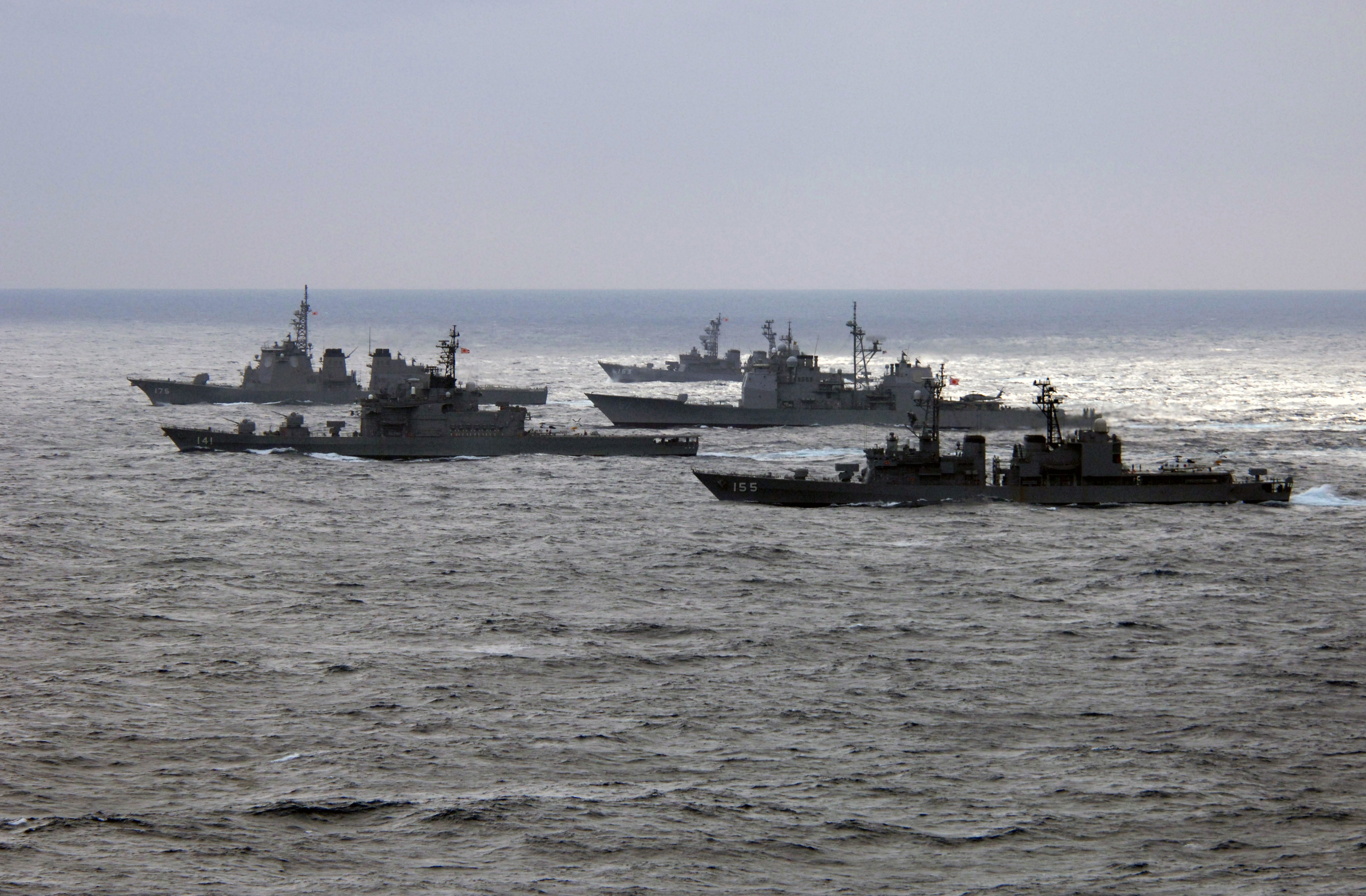
JS Hamagiri with JS Haruna, USS Russell, JS Myōkō, USS Lake Champlain, and JS Yūgiri 18 March 2007.

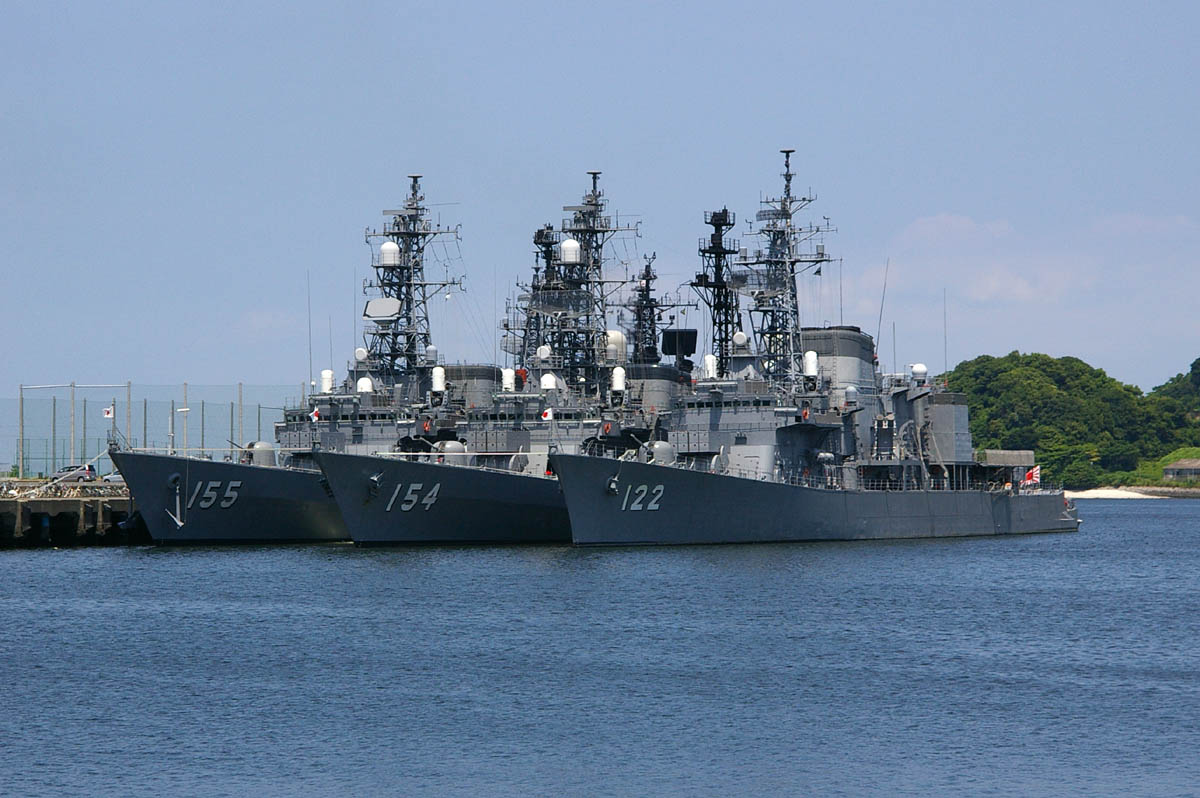
JS Hatsuyuki, JS Amagiri and Hamagiri at Yokosuka on 17 June 2007.

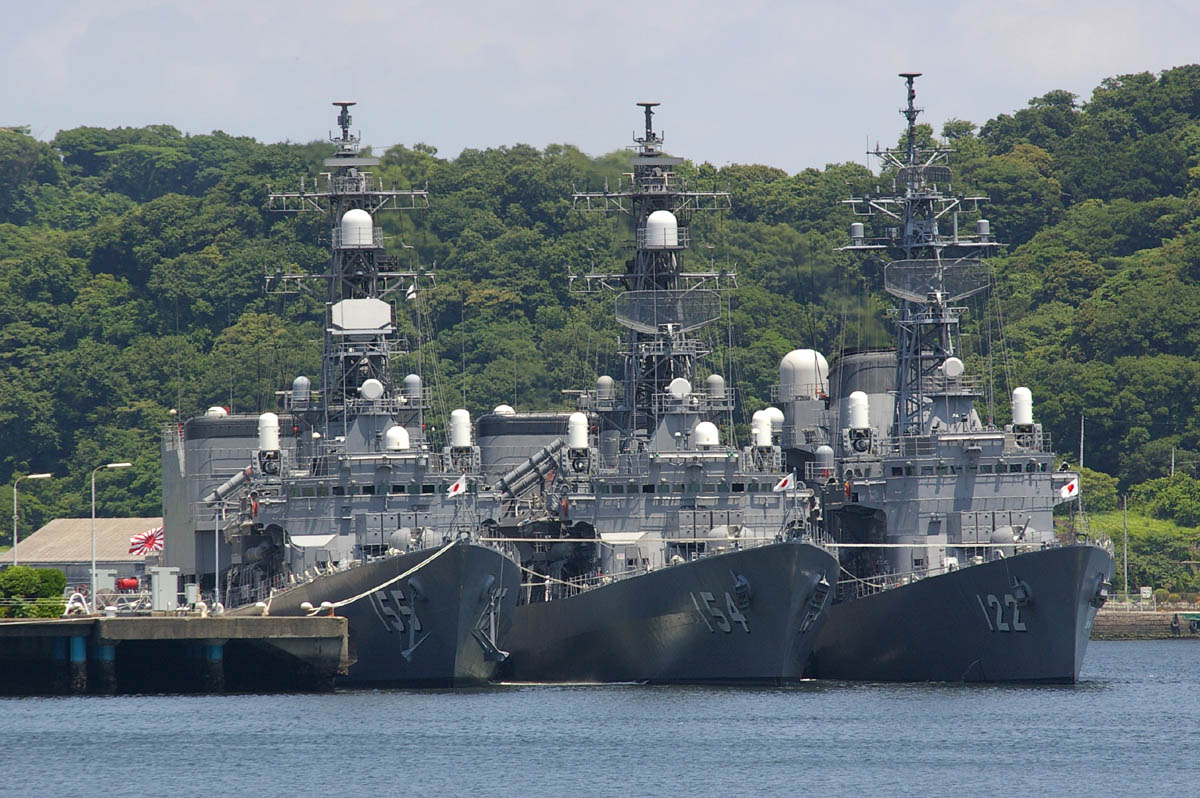
JS Hatsuyuki, JS Amagiri and Hamagiri at Yokosuka on 17 June 2007.

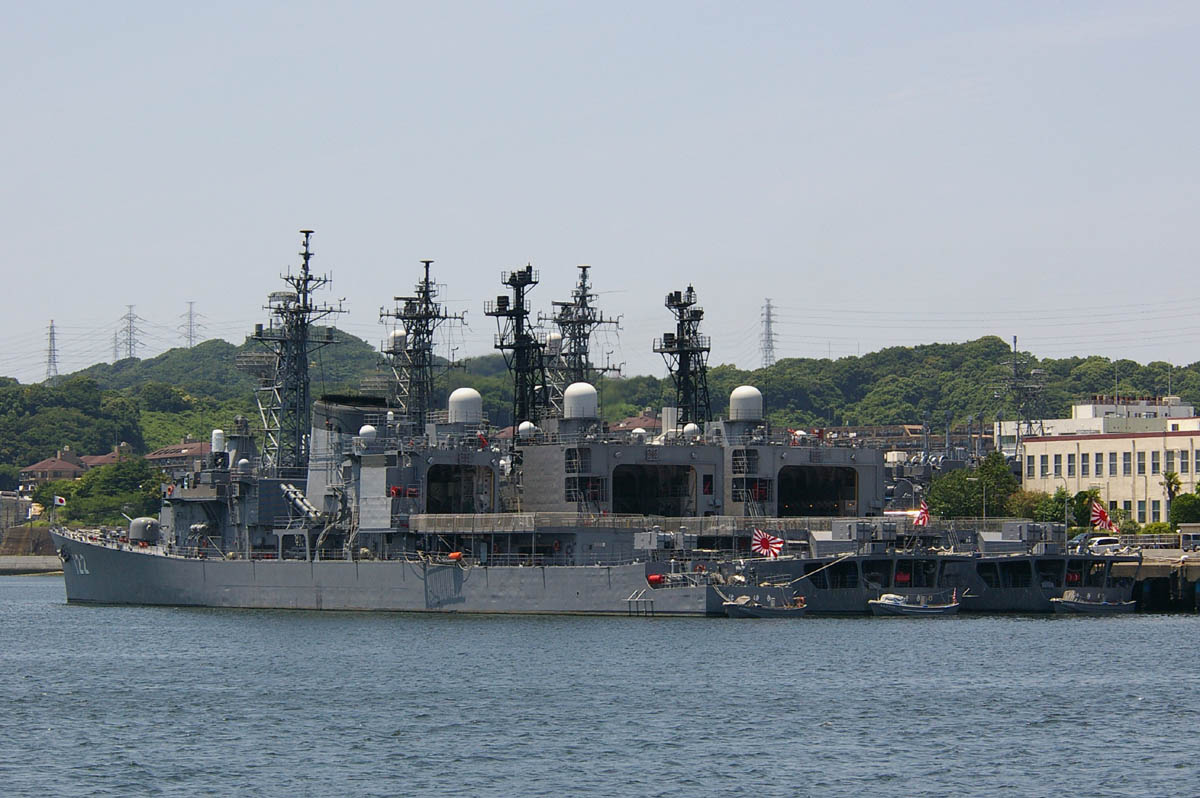
JS Hatsuyuki, JS Amagiri and Hamagiri at Yokosuka on 17 June 2007.

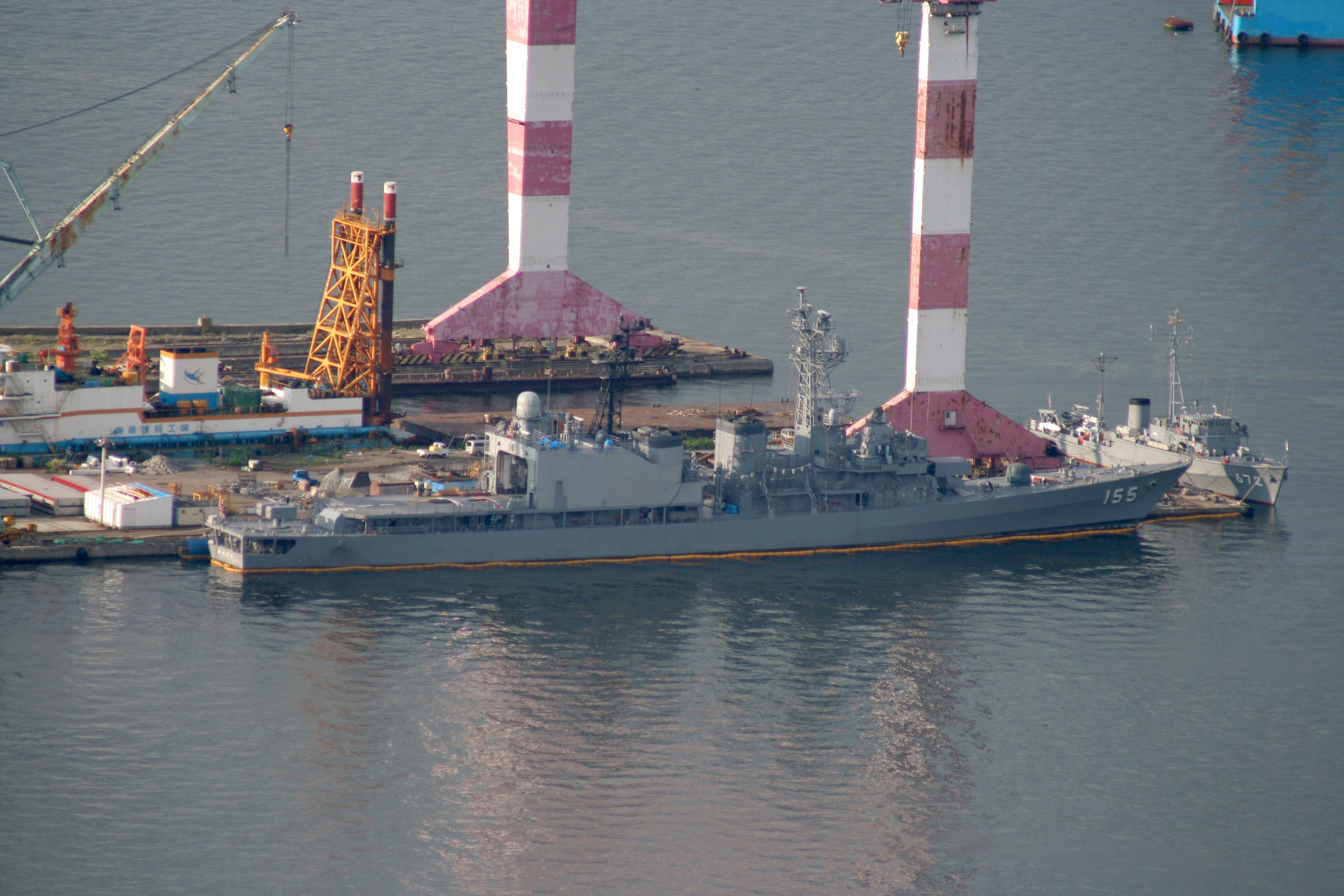
JS Hamagiri at Hakodate on 10 August 2007.

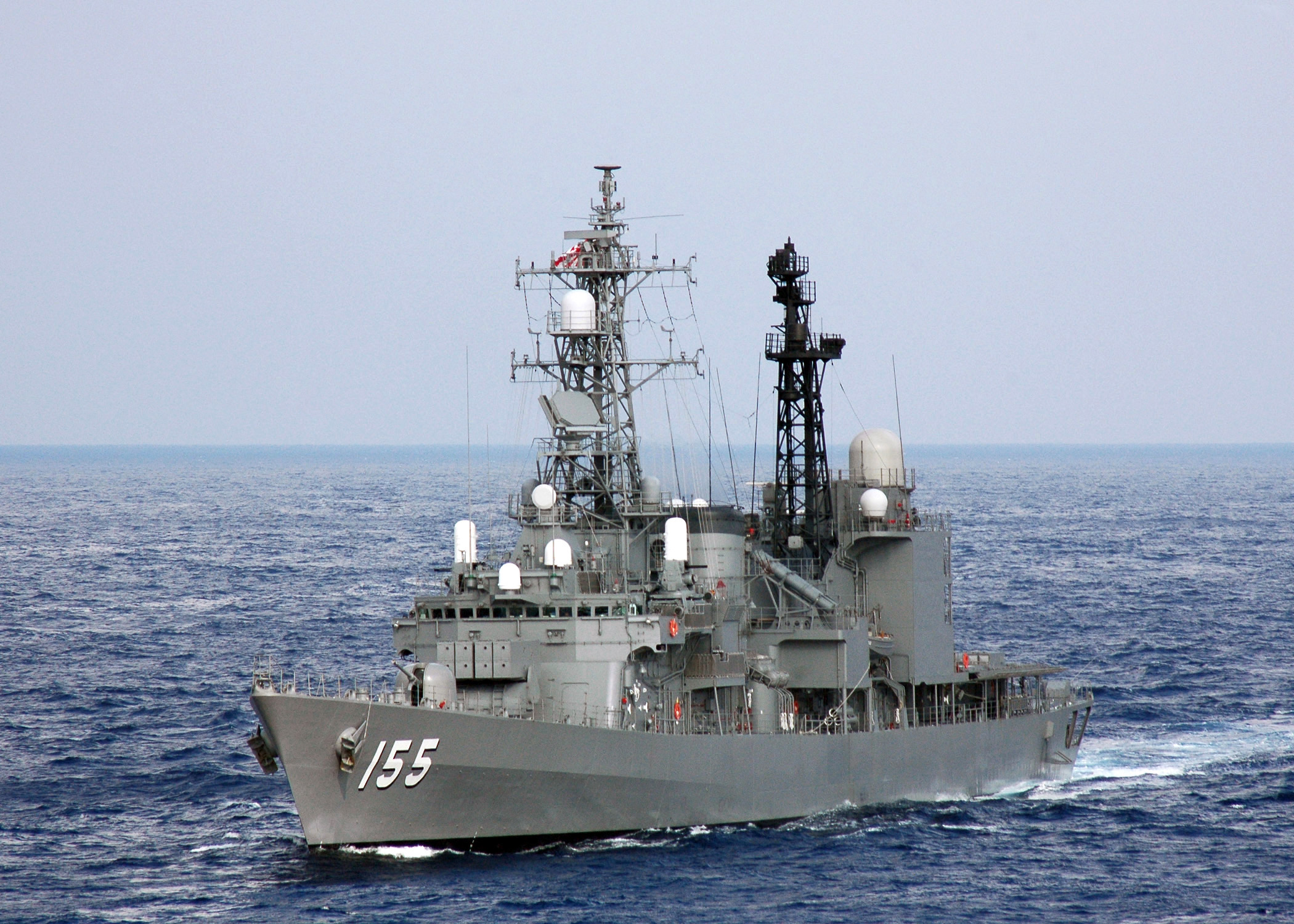
JS Hamagiri on 16 November 2007

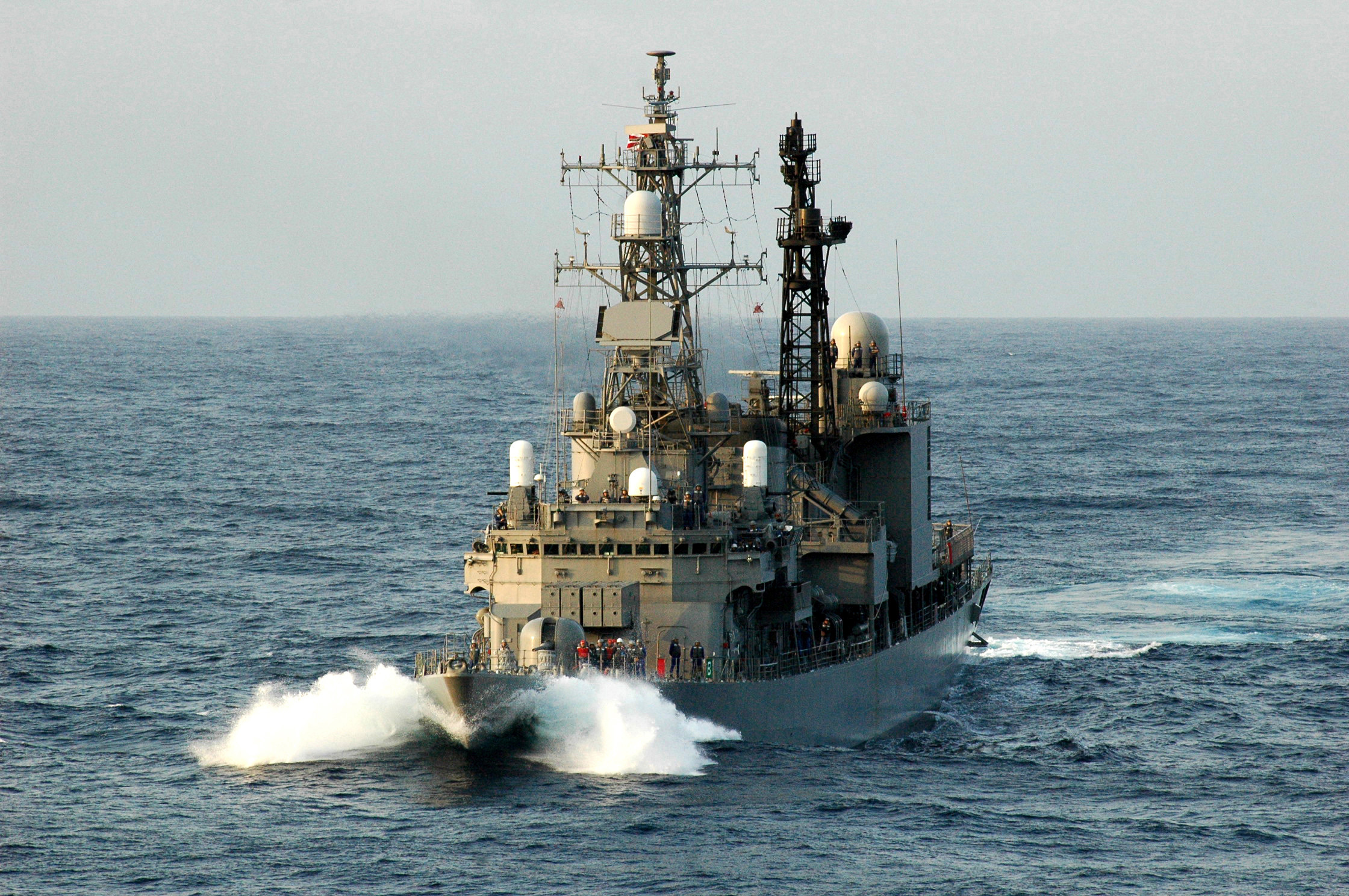
JS Hamagiri on 17 November 2007.

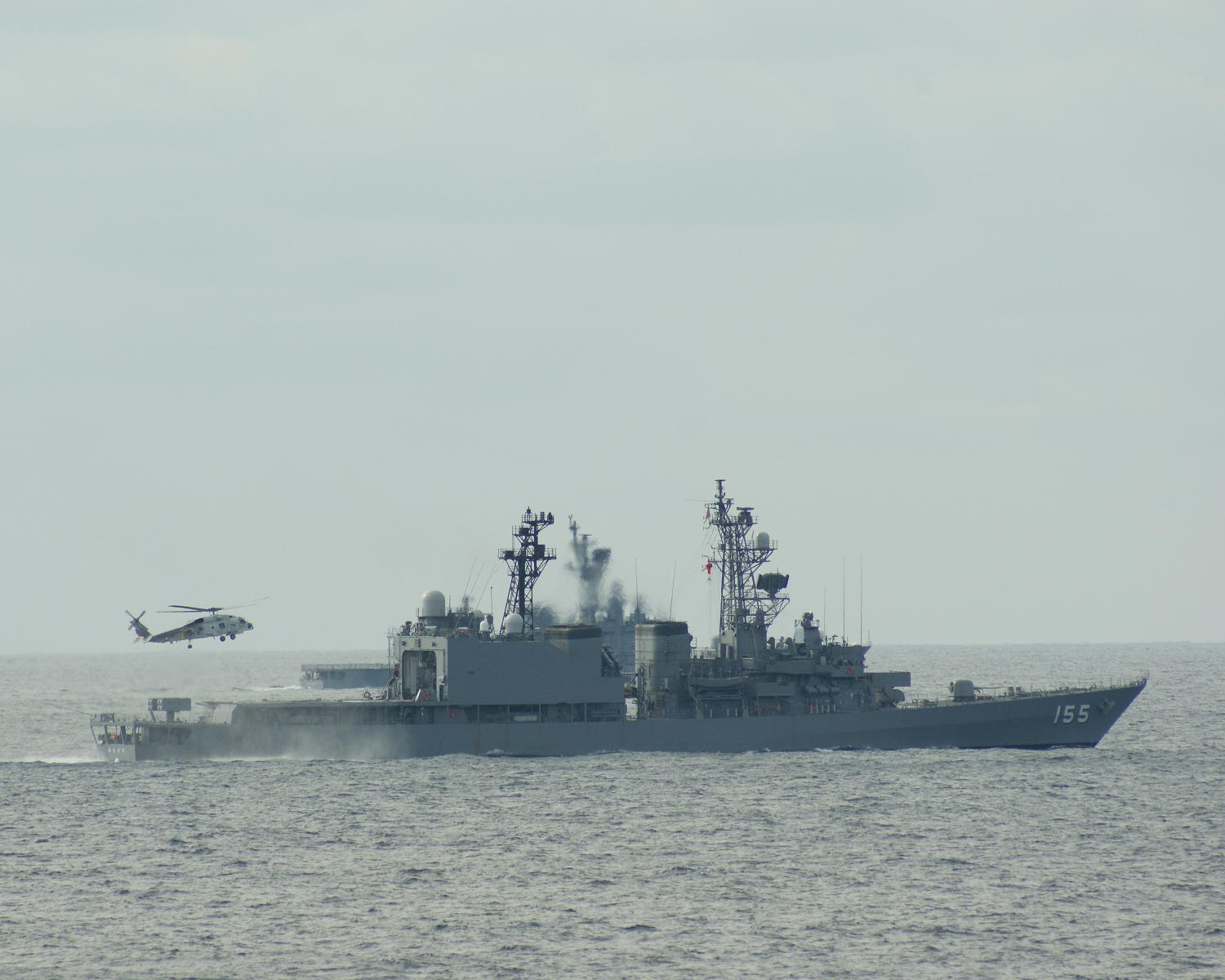
JS Hamagiri underway on 6 December 2010.

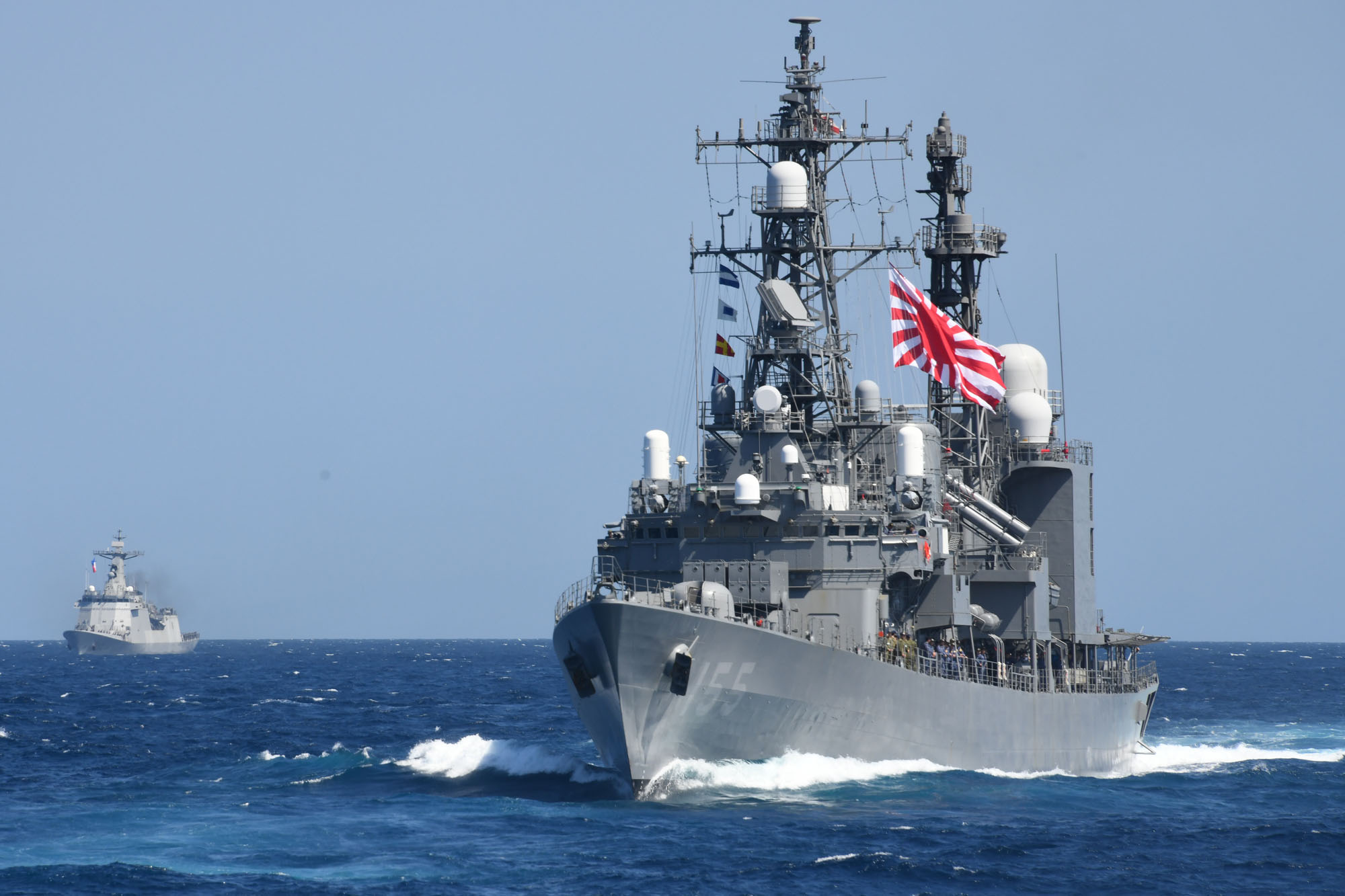
JS Hamagiri with BRP Jose Rizal behind, 8 March 2025.

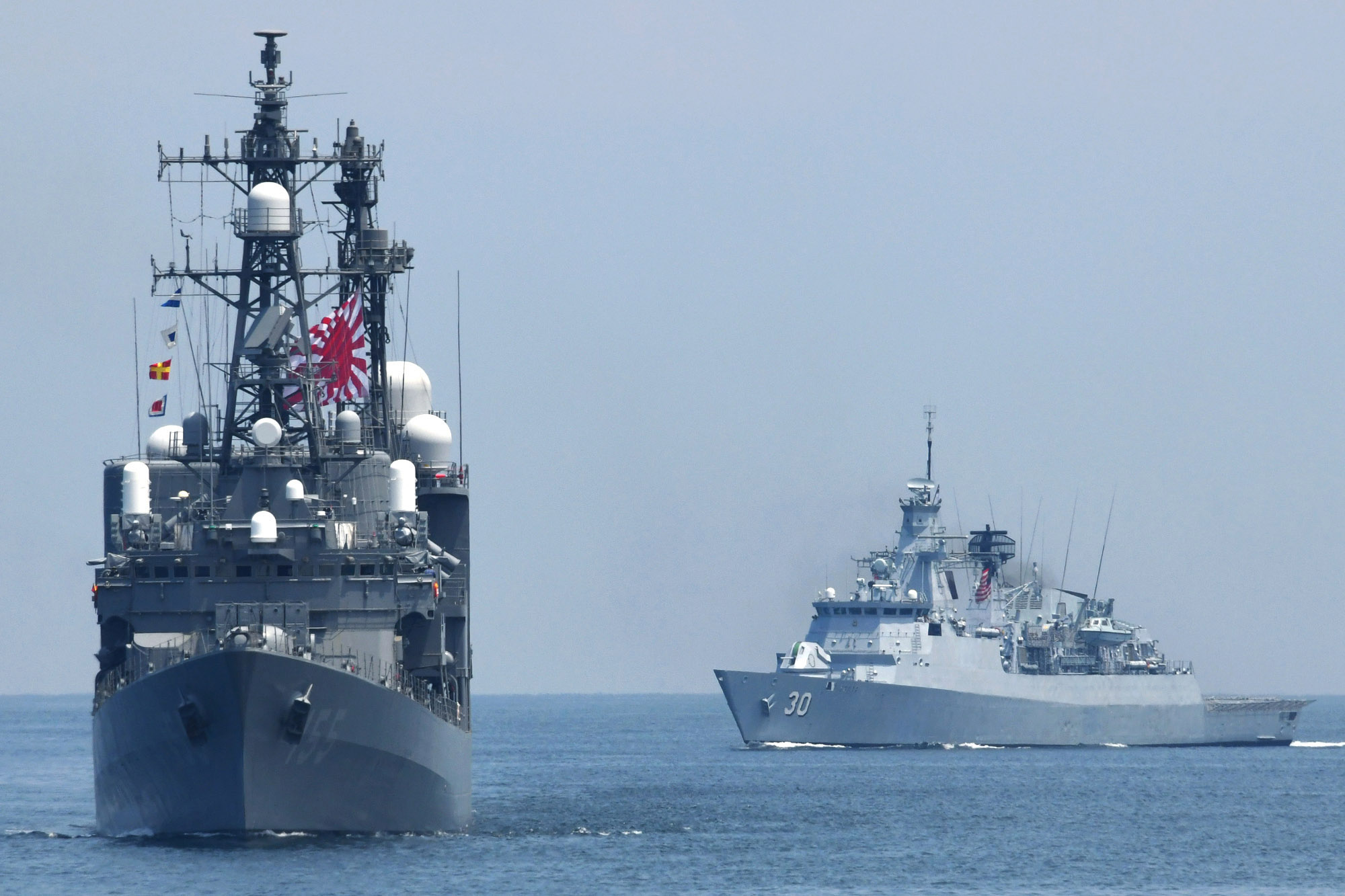
JS Hamagiri with KD Lekiu behind, 8 March 2025.
