= JS Sawagiri =

Asagiri-class destroyer

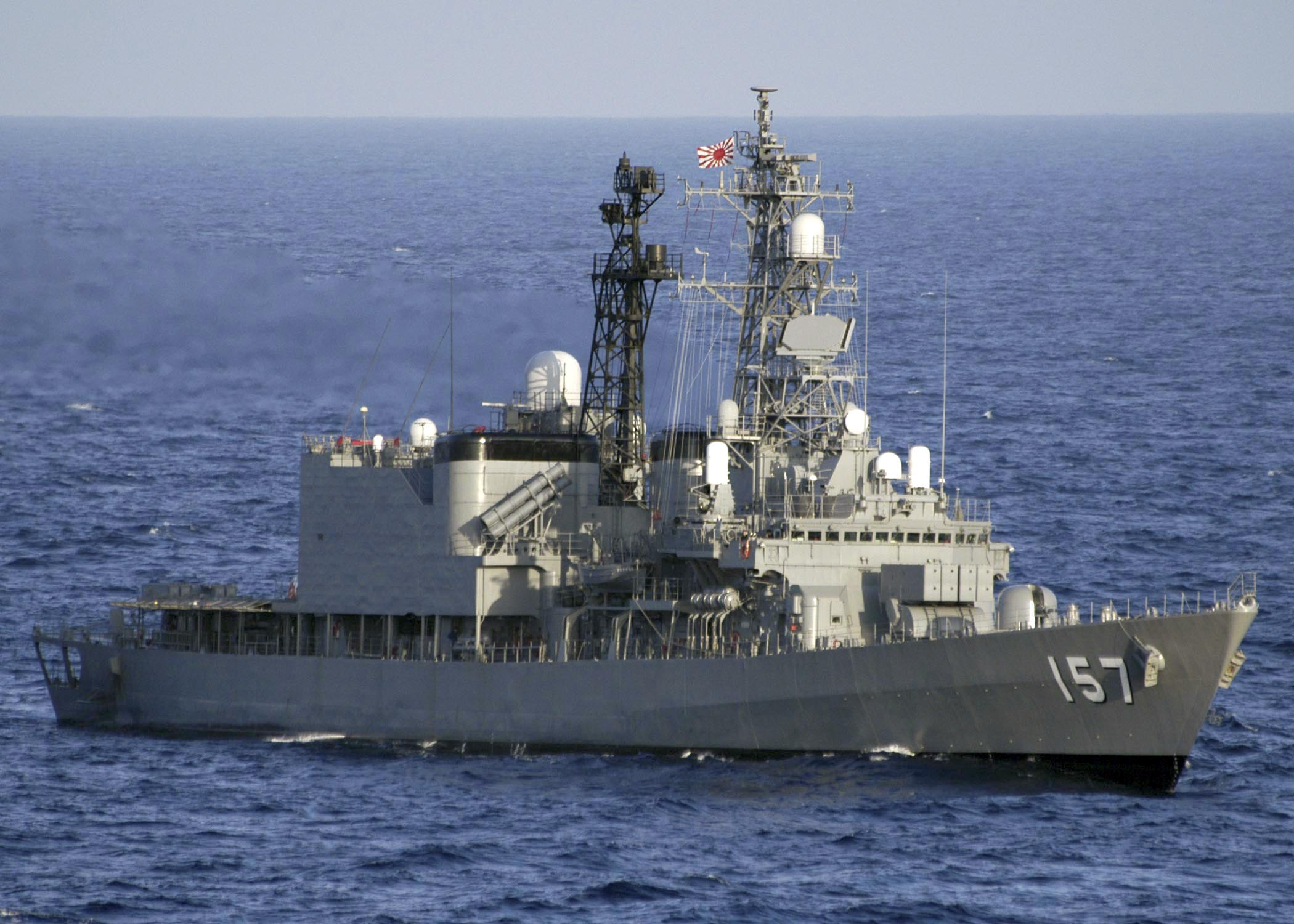
- JS Sawagiri on 18 December 2004

History

Japan
- Name: Sawagiri; (さわぎり)
- Ordered: 1985
- Builder: Mitsubishi, Nagasaki
- Laid down: 14 January 1987
- Launched: 25 September 1988
- Commissioned: 6 March 1990
- Home port: Sasebo
- Identification: MMSI number: 431999543; Pennant number: DD-157
- Status: Active

General characteristics
- Class & type: Asagiri-class destroyer
- Length: 137 m (449 ft 6 in)
- Beam: 14.6 m (47 ft 11 in)
- Draft: 4.5 m (14 ft 9 in)
- Propulsion: 4 gas turbines 54,000 shp (40,000 kW)
- Speed: 30 knots (56 km/h; 35 mph)
- Range: 8,030 nmi (14,870 km; 9,240 mi) at 14 knots (26 km/h; 16 mph)
- Complement: 220
- Sensors & processing systems: OYQ-6/7 CDS (w/ Link-11); OPS-14/24 air search radar; OPS-28 surface search radar; OQS-4A hull sonar; OQR-1 TACTASS
- Electronic warfare & decoys: NOLR-8 intercept; OLT-3 jammer; Mark 36 SRBOC
- Armament: 1 × Otobreda 76 mm gun; 2 × missile canister up to 8 Harpoon SSM; 2 × 20 mm Phalanx CIWS; 1 × Mk.29 Sea Sparrow SAM octuple launcher; 1 × Mk.16 ASROC anti-submarine rocket octuple launcher; 2 × HOS-302A triple 324 mm (12.8 in) torpedo tubes
- Aircraft carried: 1 SH-60J(K) anti-submarine helicopter

JS Sawagiri (DD-157) is an Asagiri-class destroyer of the Japan Maritime Self-Defense Force.

== Development and design ==
The Asagiri class is equipped for combat and interception missions, and is primarily armed with anti-ship weapons. They carry two of the Mk-141 Guided Missile Launching System (GMLS), which are anti-ship missile systems. The ships are also fitted to be used against submarines. They also carry Mk-32 Surface Vessel Torpedo Tubes (SVTT), which can be used as an anti-submarine weapon. The ship has two of these systems abeam to starboard and to port. They are also fitted with an Oto-Melara 62-caliber gun to be used against sea and air targets.

They are 137 m (449 ft 6 in) long. The ship can has a range of 8,000 nautical miles (15,000 km; 9,200 mi) at 14 knots (26 km/h; 16 mph) with a top speed of 30 knots (56 km/h; 35 mph). The ships can have up to 220 personnel on board. The ship is also fitted to accommodate one aircraft. The ship's flight deck can be used to service a SH-60J9(K) Seahawk helicopter.

== Construction and career ==
Sawagiri was laid down on 14 January 1987 and launched on 25 September 1988 by Mitsubishi Heavy Industries, Nagasaki. She was commissioned on 6 March 1990.

The vessel was dispatched to the Great East Japan Earthquake caused by the 2011 off the Pacific coast of Tōhoku Earthquake on 11 March 2011.

On 12 May 2012, the 12th dispatched anti-piracy action formation sailed from Sasebo off the coast of Somalia, joined by the escort ship JS Ikazuchi on the way, and started the mission about three weeks later, on 1 July. An escort formation was formed by the cooperation of the three countries of Japan, China and India. On 24 October, the same year, Sawagiri returned to Sasebo.

Sawagiri joined the 13th Escort Corps under the direct control of the Escort Fleet on 13 March 2014. On 5 July 2015, as the 22nd dispatched anti-piracy action surface corps, sailed from Sasebo base to the Gulf of Aden off the coast of Somalia with the escort ship JS Akizuki, and completed the mission on 18 December 2015.

From 29 February to 5 March 2020, the destroyer took part in joint training with the US Navy that was conducted with the escort ship JS Suzunami in the sea and airspace from the south of Kantō to the north of Guam. From the US Navy, the cruisers USS Antietam, USS Shiloh, destroyers USS Barry and USS Mustin participated in various tactical training.

== Gallery ==
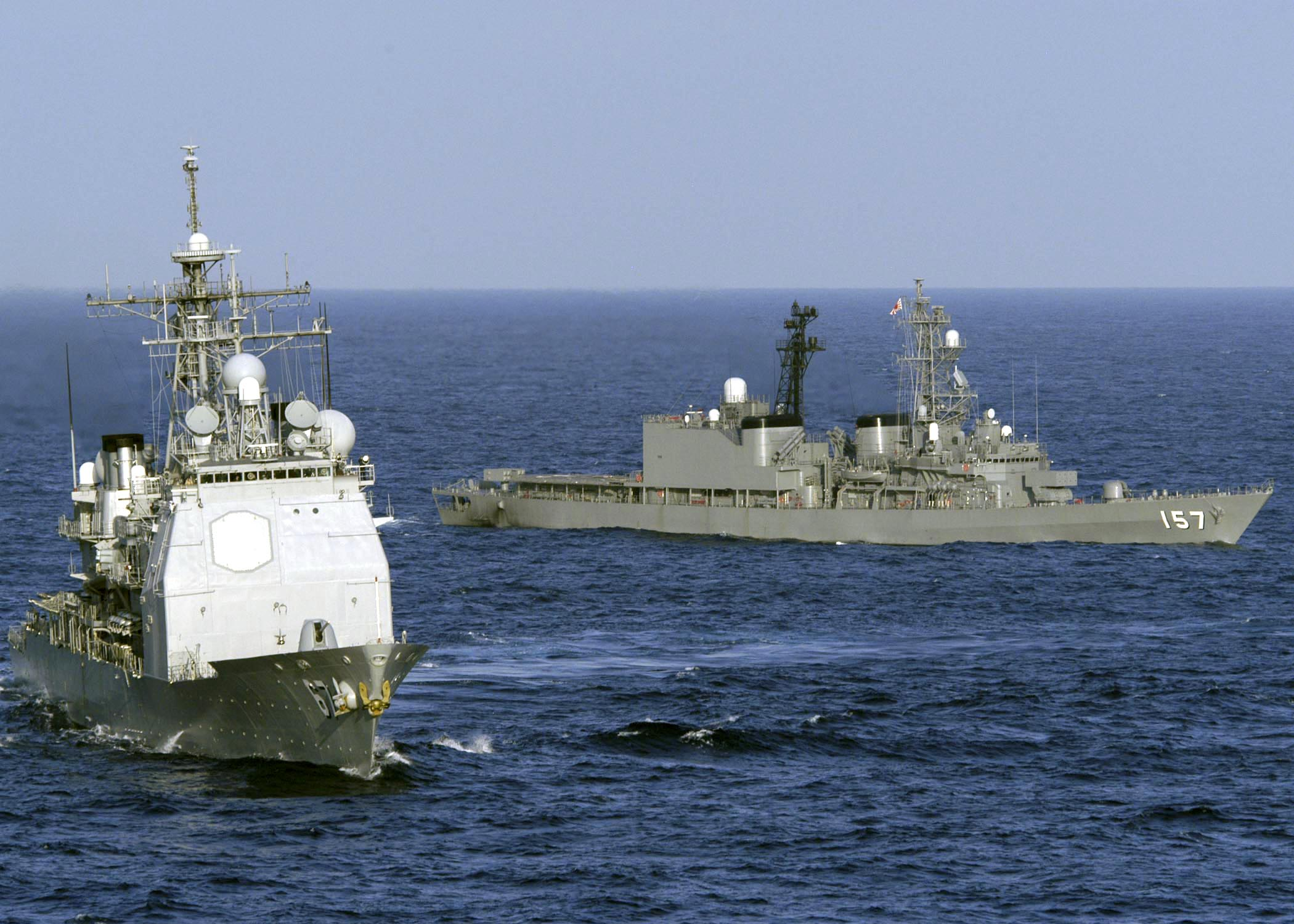
JS Sawagiri with USS Shiloh on 18 December 2004.

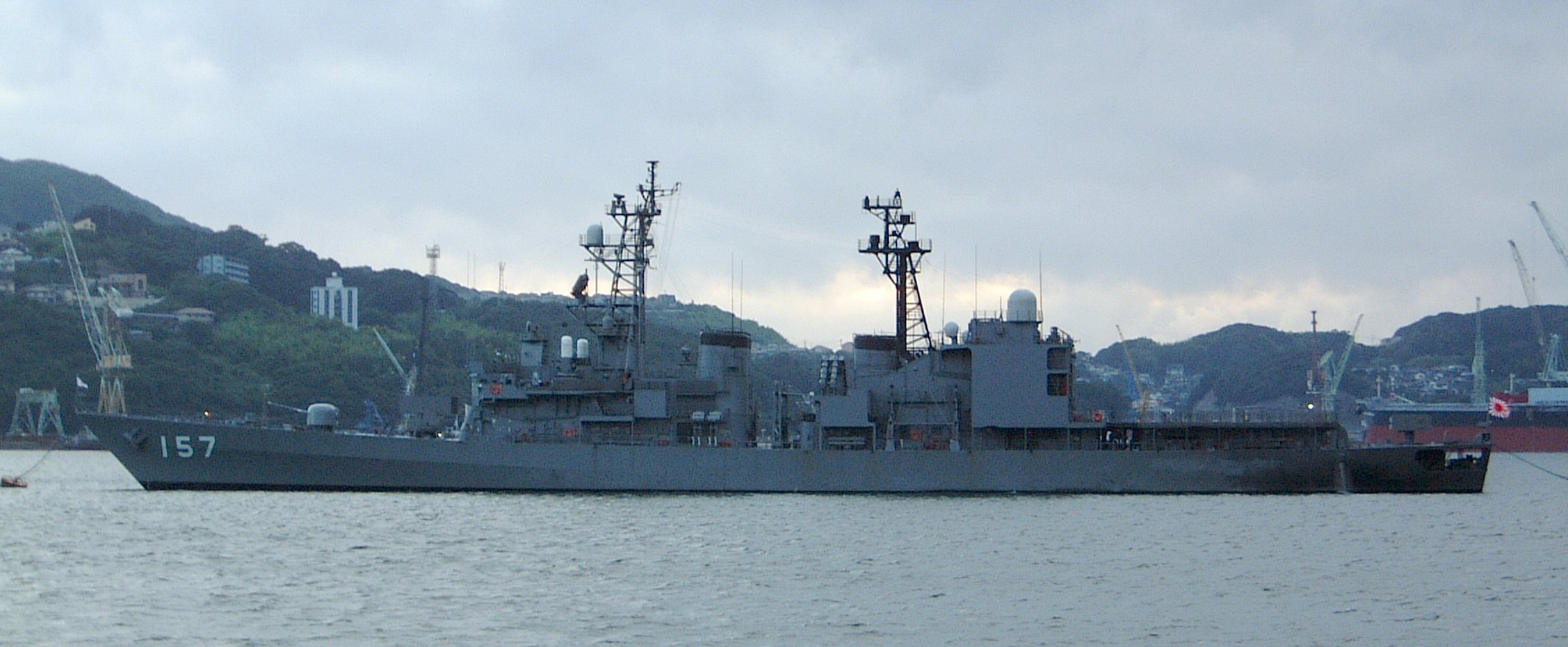
JS Sawagiri on 16 July 2006.

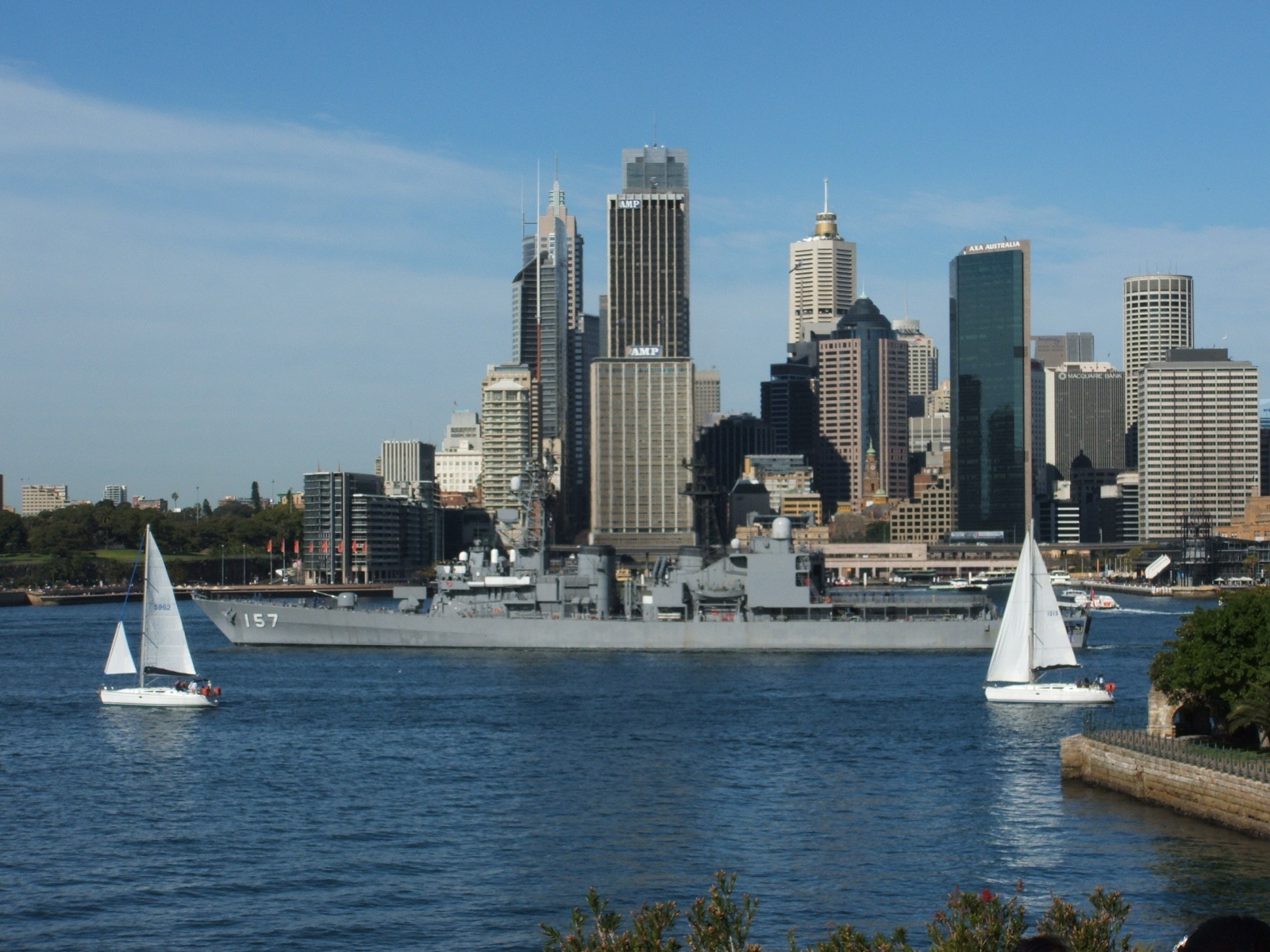
JS Sawagiri at Sydney on 10 August 2007.

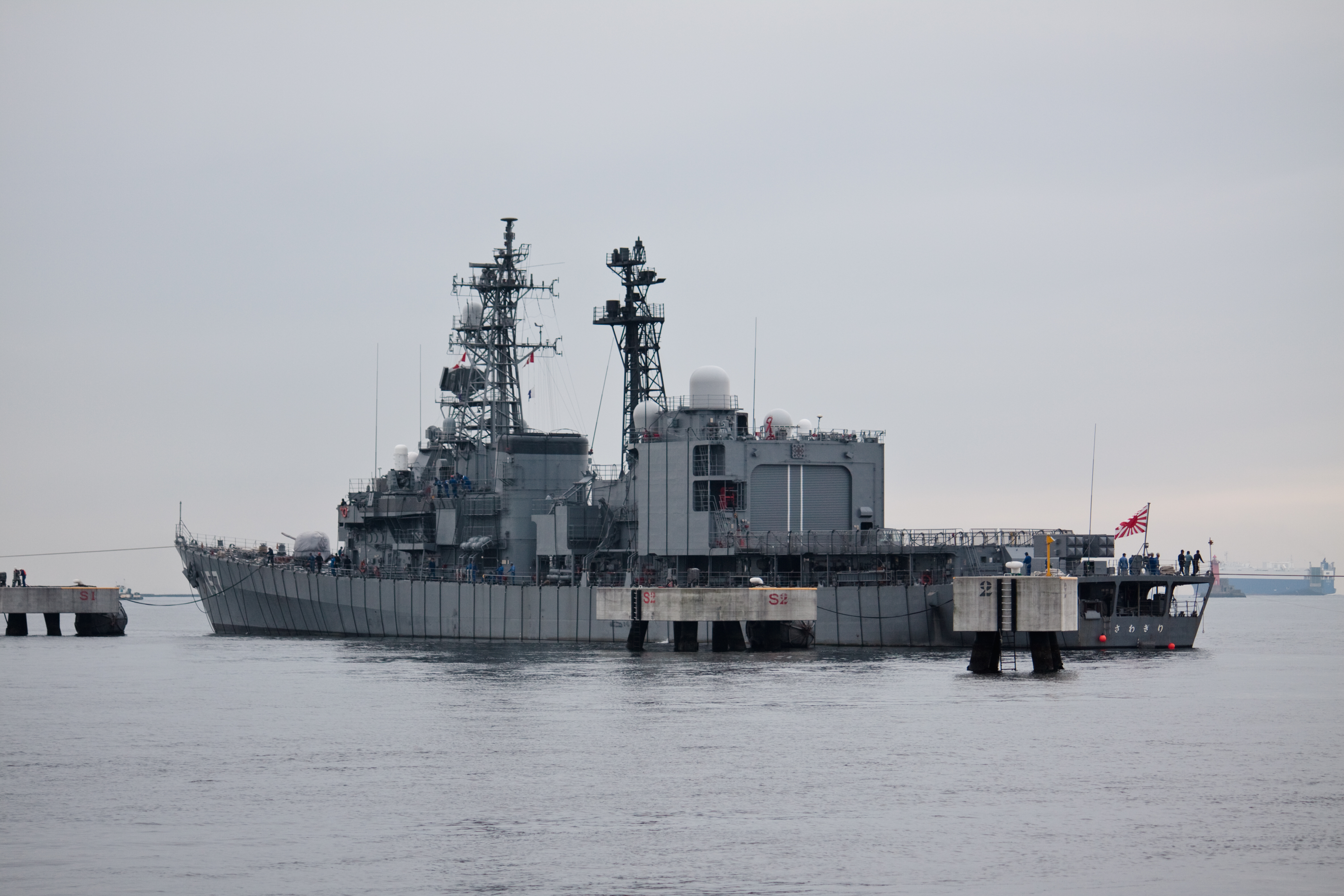
JS Sawagiri on 5 August 2009.

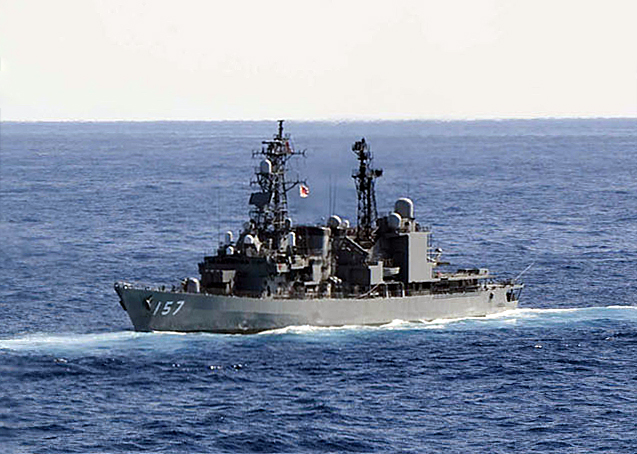
JS Sawagiri underway on 10 December 2010.

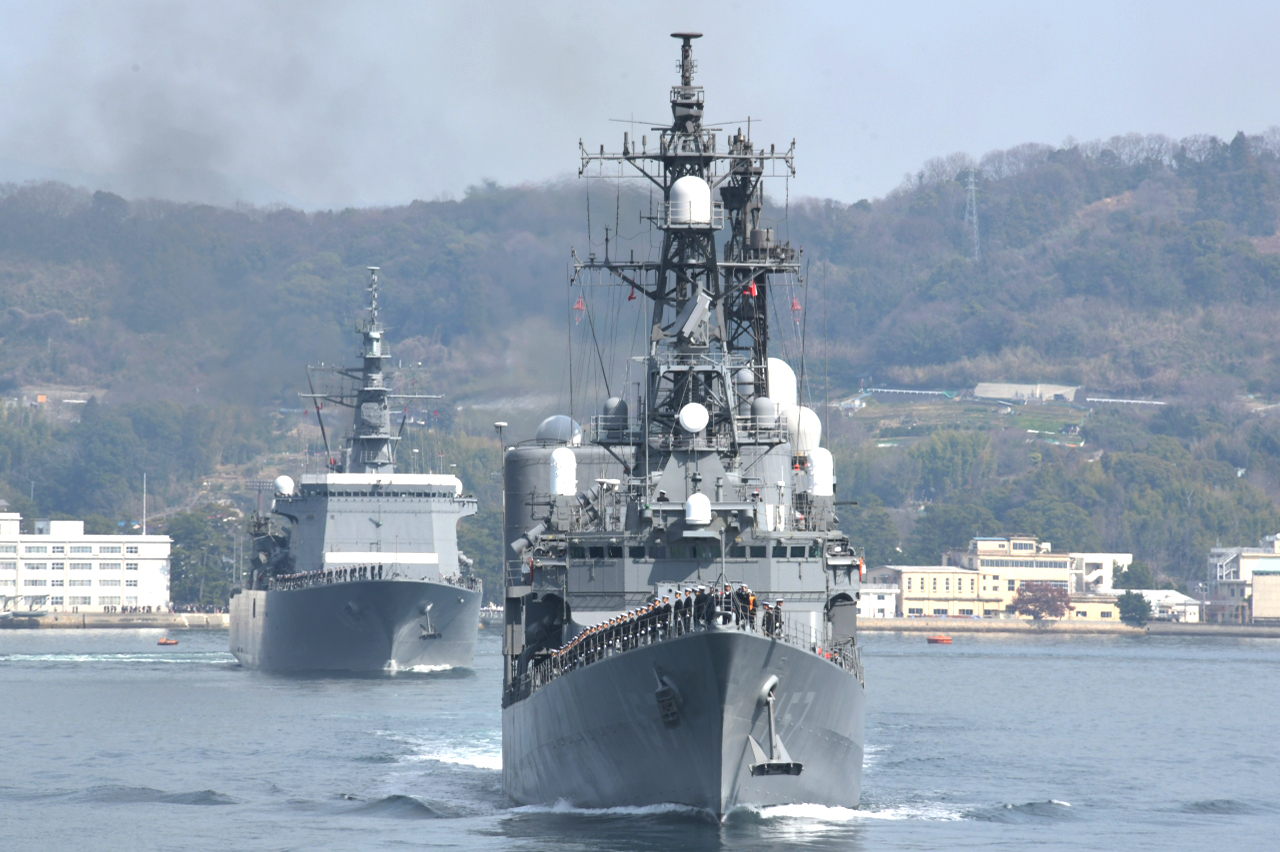
JS Sawagiri and JS Uraga leave Etajima Bay, 16 March 2024.
