= Asagiri-class destroyer =

Destroyer class in the Japanese Maritime Self-Defense Forces

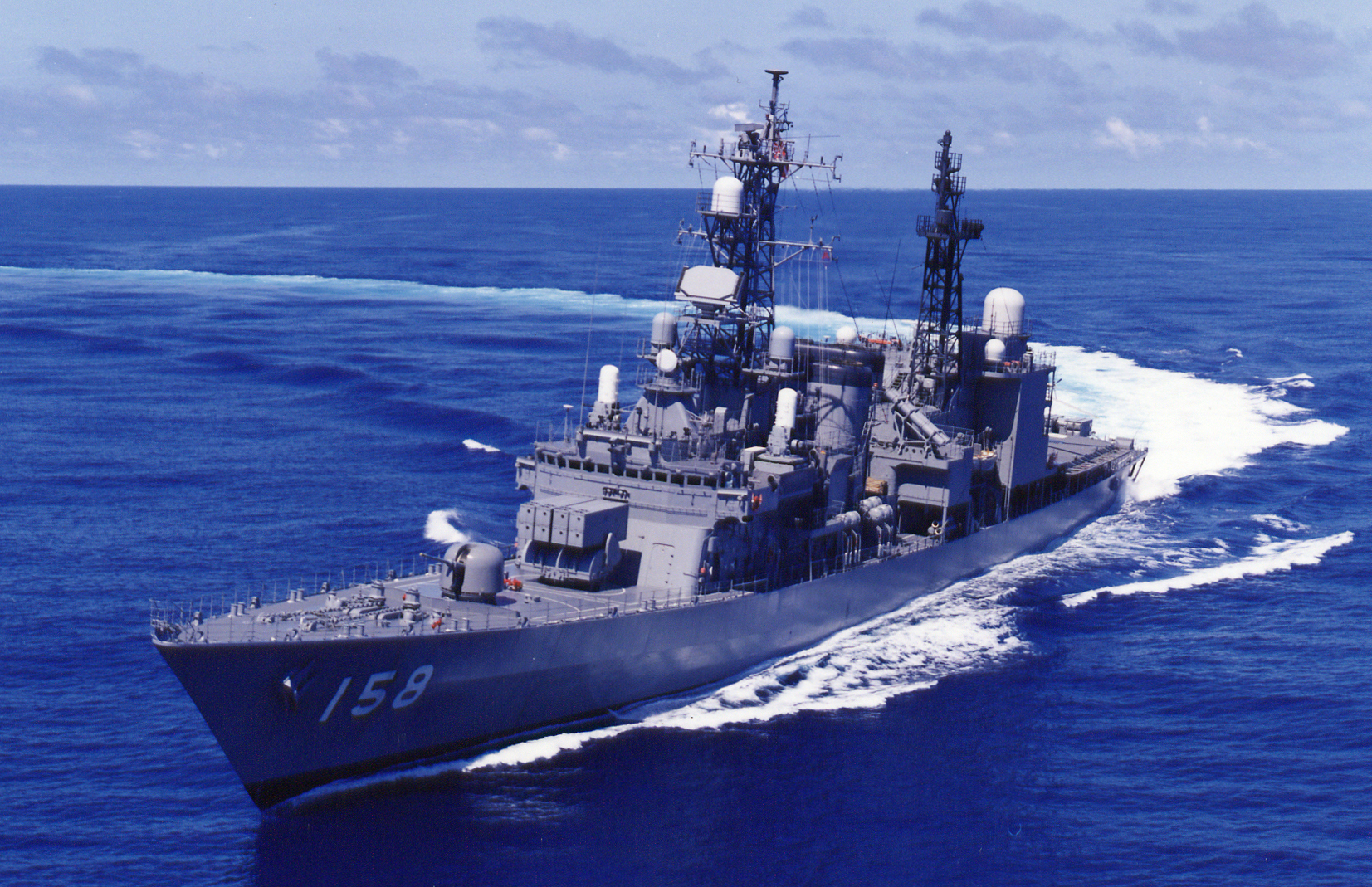
- JS Umigiri

Class overview
- Name: Asagiri-class destroyer
- Builders: Ishikawajima-Harima Heavy Industries (3); Hitachi Zosen Corporation (2); Sumitomo Heavy Industries (1); Mitsui Eng. & Shipbuilding (1); Mitsubishi Heavy Industries; Nagasaki Shipyard (1)
- Operators: Japan Maritime Self-Defense Force
- Preceded by: Hatsuyuki class
- Succeeded by: Murasame class
- Built: 1986–1989
- In commission: 1988–present
- Completed: 8 (1 converted to training ship)
- Active: 7

General characteristics
- Type: General-purpose destroyer
- Displacement: 3,500 tons standard, 4,900 tons full load
- Length: 137.0 m (449 ft 6 in)
- Beam: 14.6 m (47 ft 11 in)
- Draft: 4.5 m (14 ft 9 in)
- Depth: 8.8 m (28 ft 10 in)
- Propulsion: 4 × KHI-RR SM1A gas turbines; 54,000 shp (40,268 kW); 2 shafts, cp props
- Speed: 30 knots (56 km/h)
- Range: 6,000 nmi (11,000 km) at 20 kn (37 km/h)
- Complement: 220
- Sensors & processing systems: OYQ-6/7 CDS (w/ Link-11); OPS-14/24 air search radar; OPS-28 surface search radar; OQS-4A hull sonar; OQR-1 TASS
- Electronic warfare & decoys: NOLR-8 intercept; OLT-3 jammer; Mark 36 SRBOC; AN/SLQ-25 torpedo decoys
- Armament: 1 × OTO Melara 76 mm gun; 2 × 20 mm Phalanx CIWS; 2 × Harpoon SSM quad canisters; 1 × Sea Sparrow SAM octuple launcher; 1 × ASROC octuple launcher; 2 × triple 324 mm (12.8 in) torpedo tubes
- Aircraft carried: 1 × SH-60J/K anti-submarine helicopter

The Asagiri-class destroyer (あさぎり型護衛艦, Asagiri-gata-goei-kan) is a class of destroyer, serving with the Japan Maritime Self-Defense Force (JMSDF). It was the second class of first-generation general-purpose destroyers of the JMSDF.

== Background ==
The JMSDF started construction of a Hatsuyuki-class destroyer since FY1977. This was the first class of general-purpose destroyers (汎用護衛艦, Hanyou-goei-kan) under the eight ships / eight helicopters concept. In this concept, each flotilla would be composed of one helicopter destroyer (DDH), five general-purpose destroyers (DD), and two guided-missile destroyers (DDG).

However, due to constraints such as budget, the design of the Hatsuyuki class was compelled to compromise in terms of C4I function, resistance, and durability. Thus, destroyers to be built after FY1983, Asagiri class were changed to an evolved design with expanded hull and enhanced equipment.

In May 2026, there are talks between Jakarta and Tokyo for potentially transferring the Asagiri-class ships to the Indonesian Navy.

== Design ==
The hull is an enlarged type of Hatsuyuki class, and the hull form is of the shelter deck style. Also, as the latter batch of the Hatsuyuki class, the upper structure is made of steel, but since it was incorporated into the design from the beginning, the adverse effect on the movement performance was solved.

The engine room was greatly renovated. Instead of the COGOG propulsion system of the Hatsuyuki class, this class has the COGAG propulsion system with four Kawasaki-Rolls-Royce Spey SM1A gas turbines. With these powerful engines, it was possible to run at 26 knots (48 km/h; 30 mph) by driving only two of the four engines, and the benefits of tracking a submarine were especially great. An alternating arrangement was introduced to improve resistance and durability, as in the steam turbine driven destroyers.

== Equipment ==
The earlier batch was equipped with the OYQ-6 combat direction system (CDS). This system employed one AN/UYK-20 computer as the same as the OYQ-5 tactical data processing system of the Hatsuyuki class, but with expanded memories, it can exchange tactical data via Link-11, which the OYQ-5 does not support. Later, all OYQ-6 systems were upgraded to the OYQ-7, integrated with the OYQ-101 ASW Direction System. All ships of this class were later retrofitted with the terminal for the MOF system, the key operational C4I system of the JMSDF which uses the Superbird SHF-SATCOM.

The surface-search radars were replaced by OPS-28. The air-search radars were updated to OPS-14C in the earlier batch, and in the latter batch, OPS-24 3D radars were introduced. This was a maritime version of the land-based J/FPS-3 early-warning radar, and first shipboard active electronically scanned array radar in the world. In the latter batch, electronic warfare support measures systems were also replaced by NOLR-8, completely newly developed with emphasis on anti-ship missile defense.

Its weapon system is basically the same as the Hatsuyuki class except for the minor change on its FCS. However, a new SH-60J was installed as a shipboard helicopter, so a large capacity data link device was installed. The hangar is enlarged in order to accommodate two helicopters, but only one helicopter is used operationally.

== Ships in the class ==
Yamagiri and Asagiri were converted into training vessels for a few years. Yamagiri converted again in 2025.

Pennant no.	Name	Laid down	Launched	Commissioned	Decommissioned	Builder	Home port	Note
DD-151; TV-3516	Asagiri	13 February 1985	19 September 1986	17 March 1988	23 March 2026	IHI Corporation, Tokyo	Maizuru	Converted to training vessel (TV-3516) on 16 February 2005 re-converted to DD-151 on 14 March 2012
TV-3515; DD-152	Yamagiri	3 March 1986	10 October 1987	25 January 1989		Mitsui, Tamano	Yokosuka	Converted to training vessel (TV-3515) on 18 March 2004 re-converted to DD-152 in March 2011 re-converted to TV-3515 in 2025
DD-153	Yūgiri	25 February 1986	21 September 1987	28 February 1989		Sumitomo Heavy Industries, Uraga	Yokosuka	4 June 1996 - accidentally shot down USN A-6E Intruder during live-fire CIWS exercise (part of RIMPAC '96); two aviators ejected safely & rescued by Yūgiri; malfunction in Phalanx CIWS initially implicated as cause of incident but human error later blamed
DD-154	Amagiri	3 March 1986	9 September 1987	28 February 1989		IHI Corporation, Tokyo	Yokosuka	
DD-155	Hamagiri	20 January 1987	4 June 1988	31 January 1990		Hitachi, Maizuru	Ominato	
DD-156	Setogiri	9 March 1987	12 September 1988	14 February 1990		Hitachi Zosen Corporation	Maizuru	
DD-157	Sawagiri	14 January 1987	25 September 1988	6 March 1990		Mitsubishi Heavy Industries Nagasaki	Sasebo	
DD-158	Umigiri	31 October 1988	9 November 1989	12 March 1991		IHI Corporation, Tokyo	Kure	

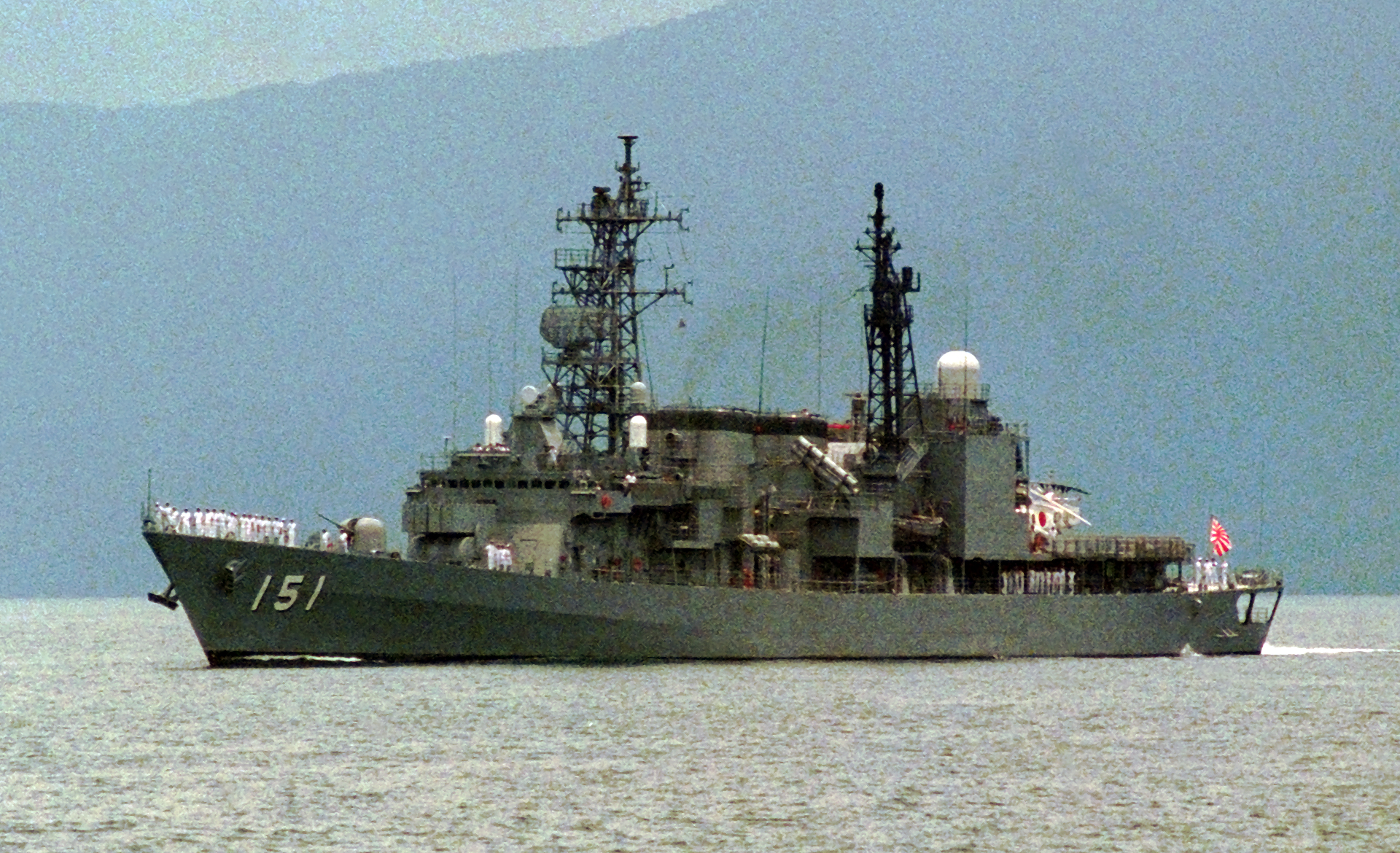
JS Asagiri (DD-151)

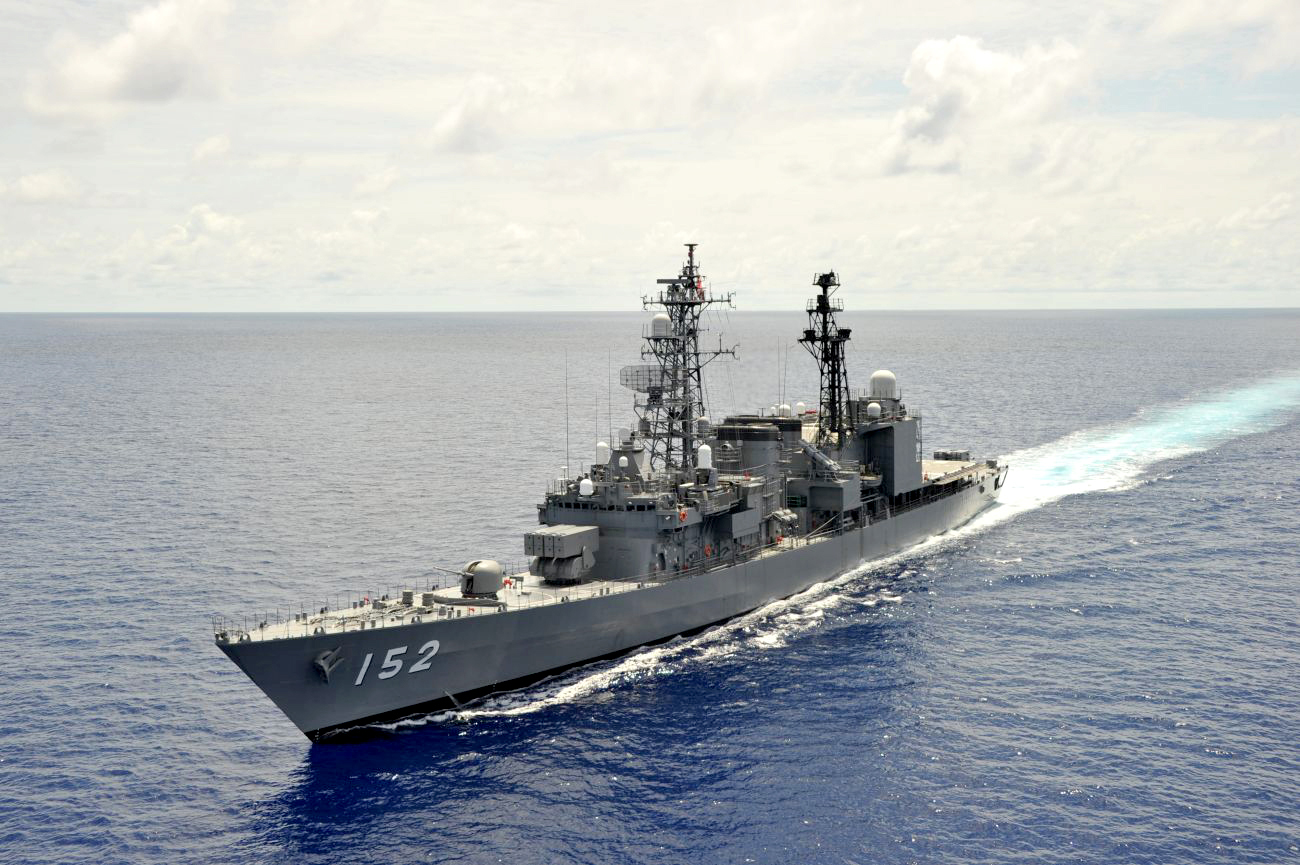
JS Yamagiri (DD-152)

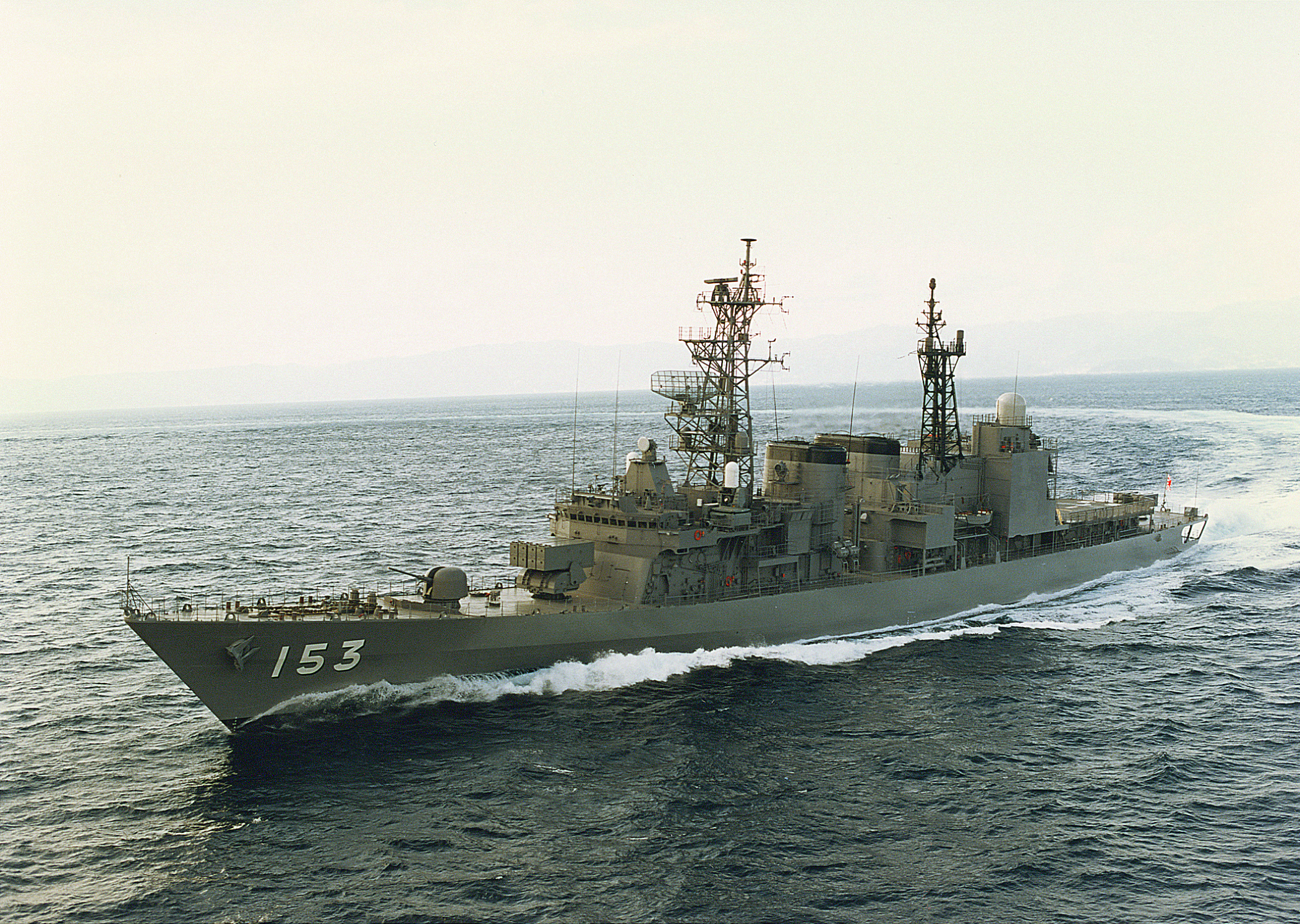
JS Yūgiri (DD-153)

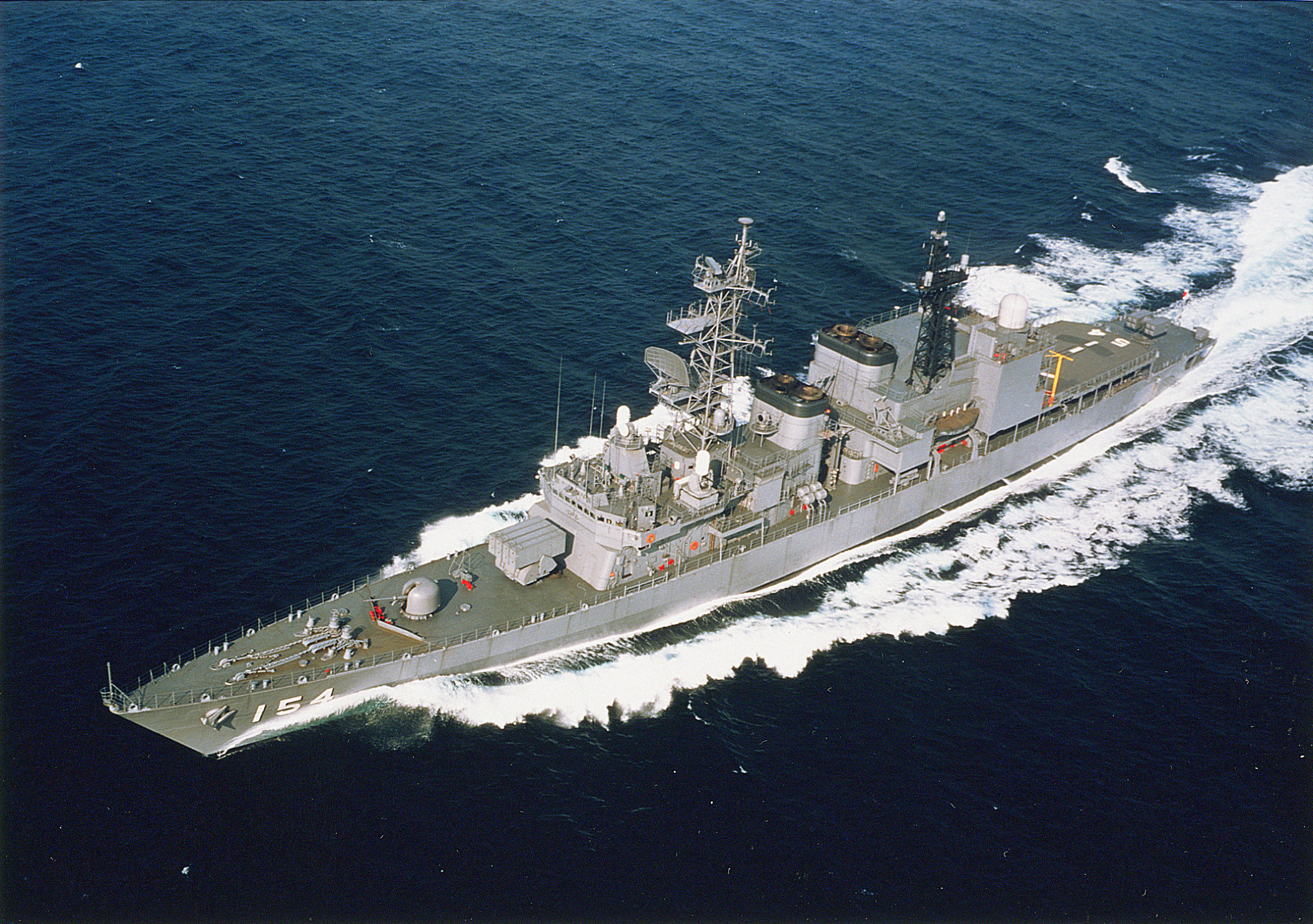
JS Amagiri (DD-154)

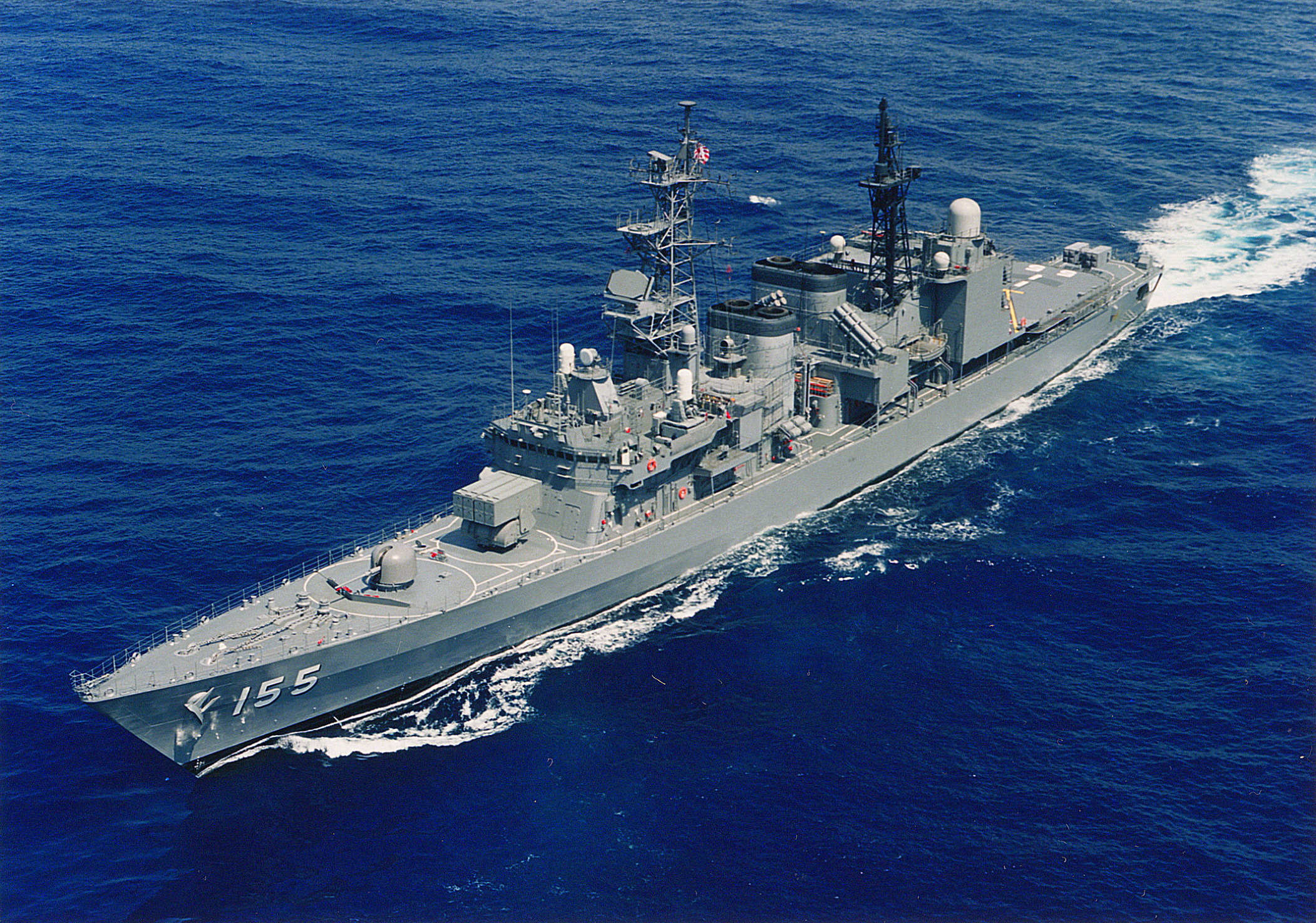
JS Hamagiri (DD-155)

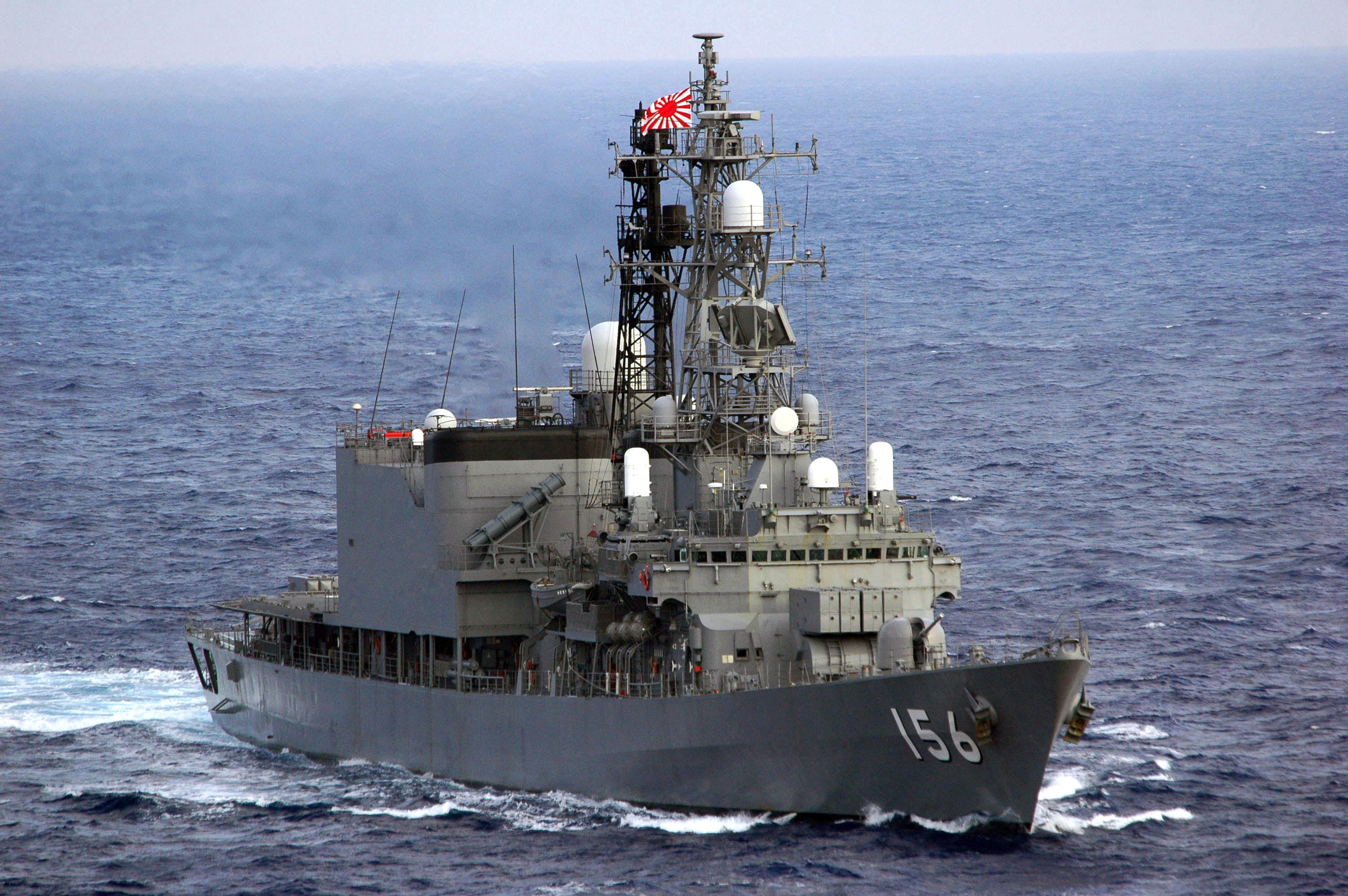
JS Setogiri (DD-156)

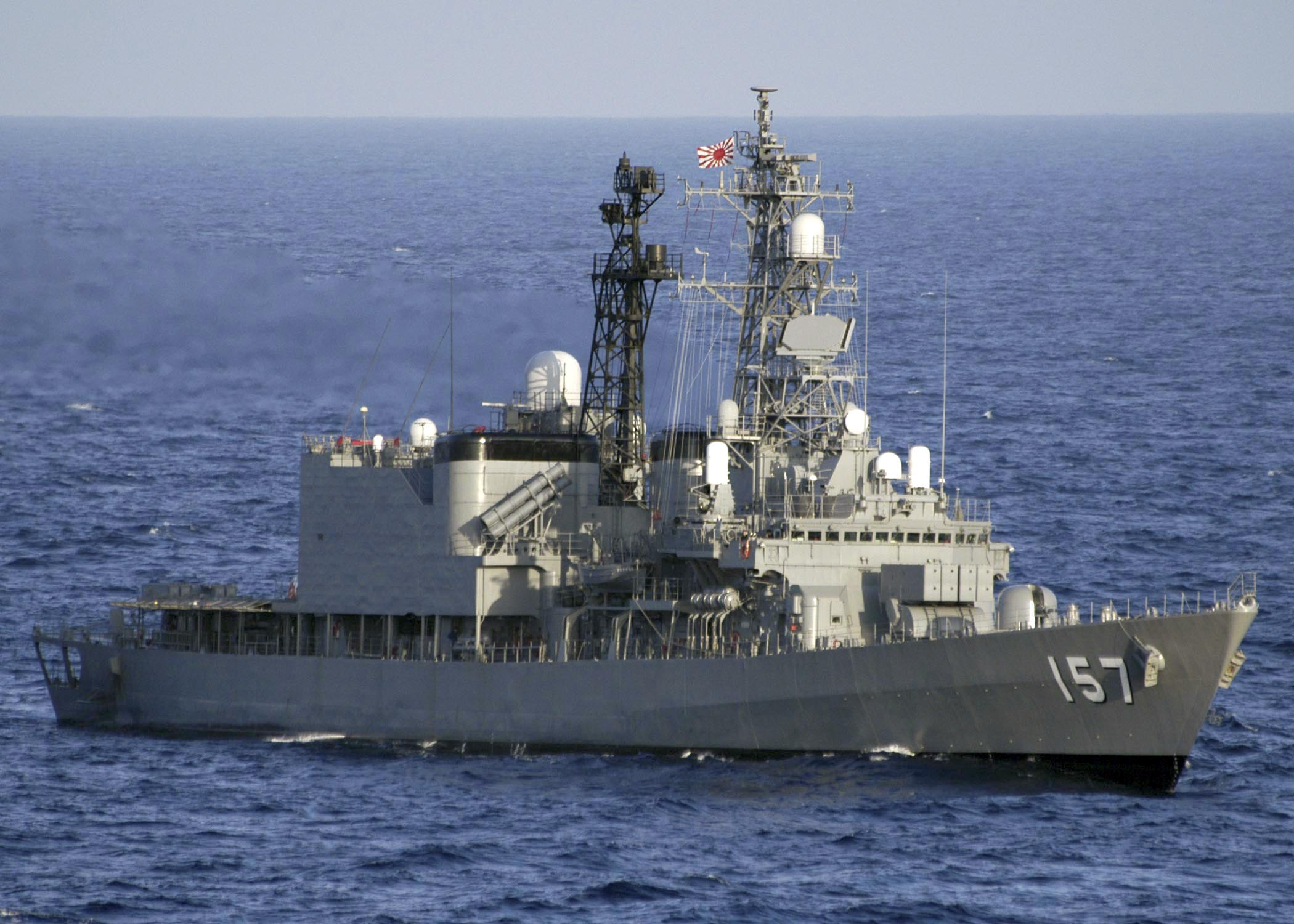
JS Sawagiri (DD-157)

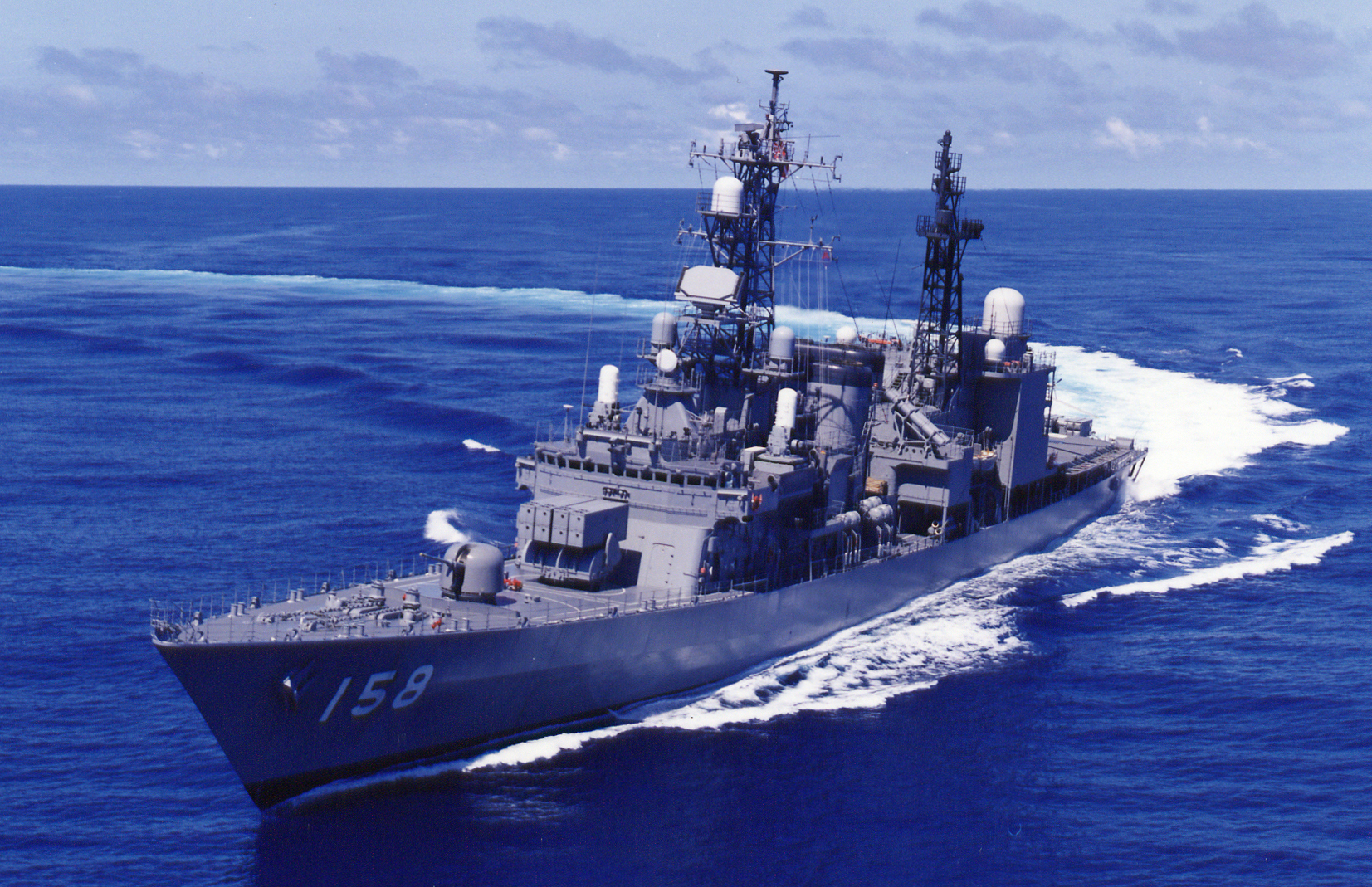
JS Umigiri (DD-158)

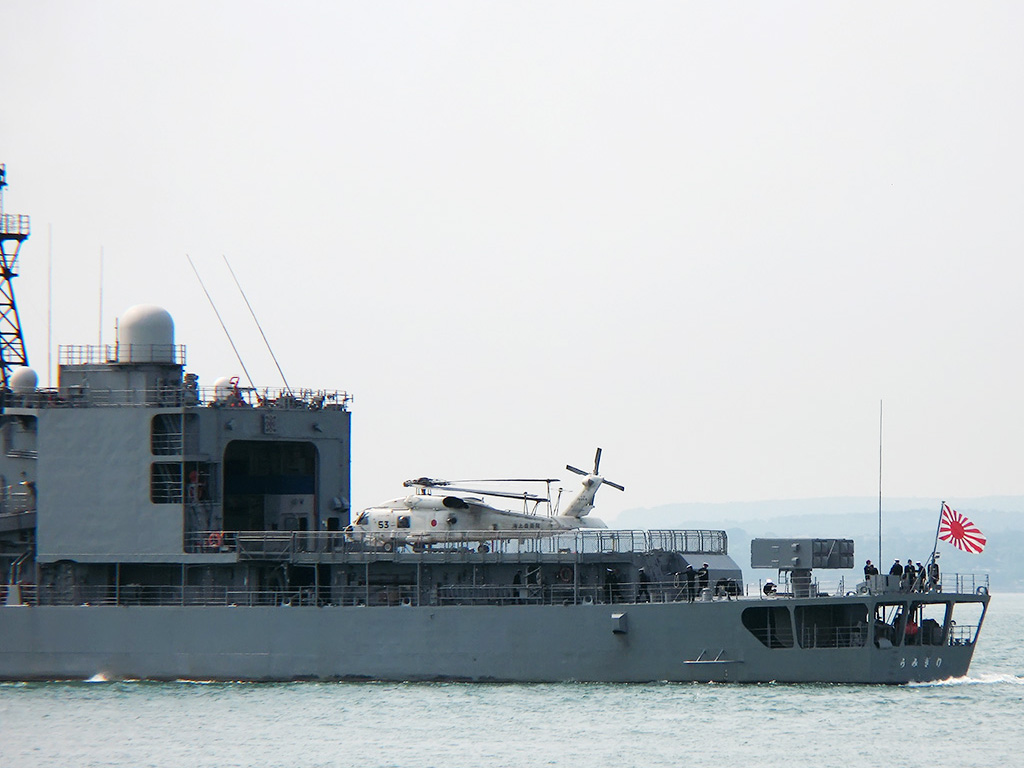
The hangar deck of JS Umigiri (DD-158)

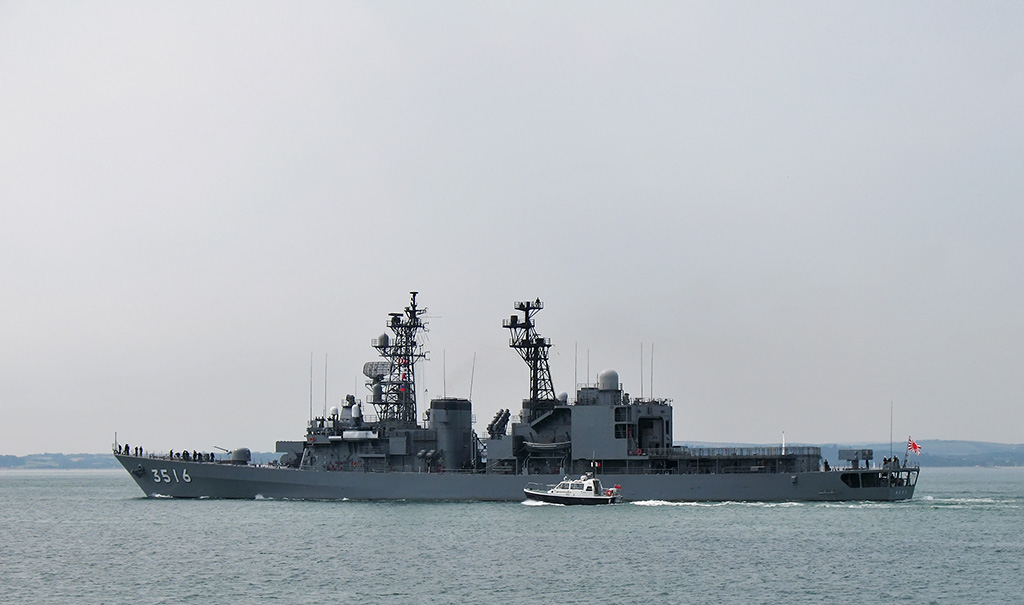
JS Asagiri (TV-3516)
