= JS Amagiri =

Asagiri-class destroyer

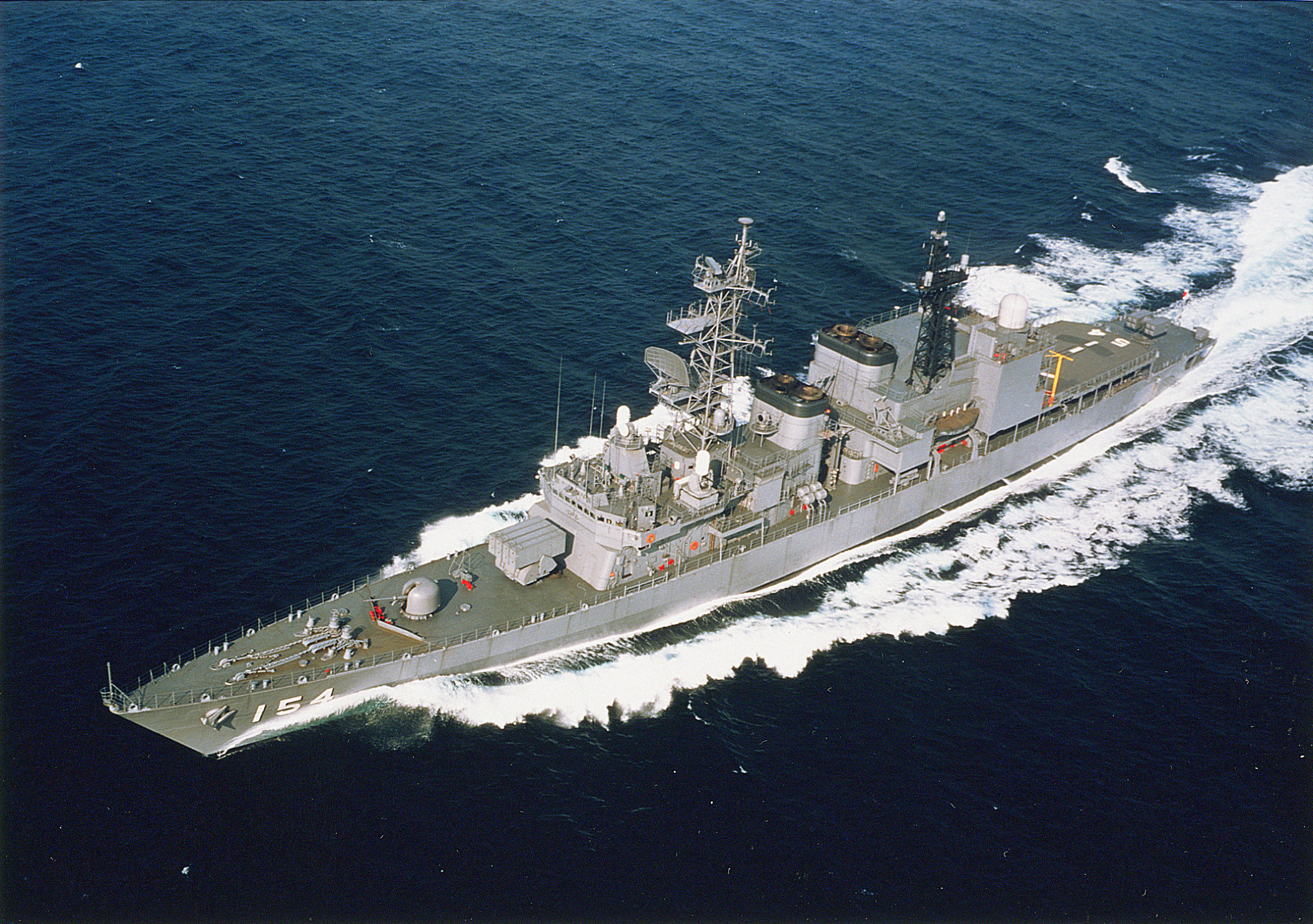
- JS Amagiri (DD-154)

History

Japan
- Name: Amagiri; (あまぎり)
- Laid down: March 3, 1986
- Launched: September 9, 1987
- Commissioned: February 28, 1989
- Identification: MMSI number: 431999537
- Status: in active service

General characteristics
- Class & type: Asagiri-class destroyer
- Length: 137 m (449 ft 6 in)
- Beam: 14.6 m (47 ft 11 in)
- Draft: 4.5 m (14 ft 9 in)
- Propulsion: 4 gas turbines 54,000 shp (40,000 kW)
- Speed: 30 knots (56 km/h; 35 mph)
- Range: 8,030 nmi (14,870 km; 9,240 mi) at 14 knots (26 km/h; 16 mph)
- Complement: 220
- Sensors & processing systems: OYQ-6/7 CDS (w/ Link-11); OPS-14/24 air search radar; OPS-28 surface search radar; OQS-4A hull sonar; OQR-1 TACTASS
- Electronic warfare & decoys: NOLR-8 intercept; OLT-3 jammer; Mark 36 SRBOC
- Armament: 1 × Otobreda 76 mm gun; 2 × missile canister up to 8 Harpoon SSM; 2 × 20 mm Phalanx CIWS; 1 × Mk.29 Sea Sparrow SAM octuple launcher; 1 × Mk.16 ASROC anti-submarine rocket octuple launcher; 2 × HOS-302A triple 324 mm (12.8 in) torpedo tubes
- Aircraft carried: 1 SH-60J(K) anti-submarine helicopter

JS Amagiri (DD-154) is an Asagiri-class destroyer of the Japan Maritime Self-Defense Force. Amagiri is currently in active service, homeported in Maizuru, Kyoto, Japan.

== Description ==
=== Armaments ===
Amagiri is equipped for combat and interception missions and is primarily armed with anti-ship weapons. Amagiri carries two of the Mk-141 Guided Missile Launching System (GMLS), which are anti-ship missile systems. The ship is also fitted to be used against submarines. She also carries the Mk-32 Surface Vessel Torpedo Tubes (SVTT), which can be used as an anti-submarine weapon. The ship has two of these systems abeam to starboard and to port. Amagiri is also fitted with an Oto-Melara 62-caliber gun to be used against sea and air targets.

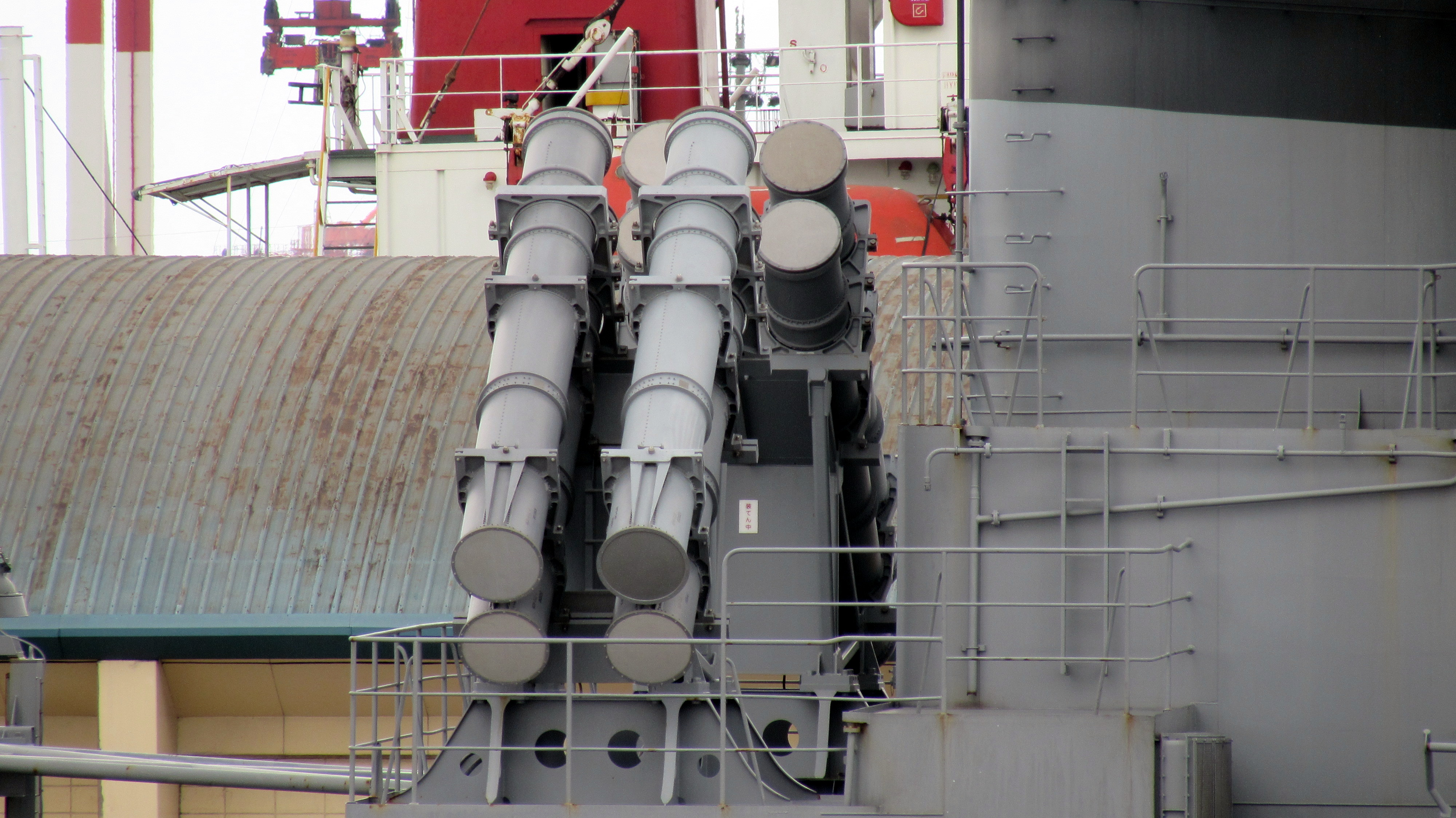
Mk-141 Guided Missile Launching System

=== Specifications ===
Amagiri is 137 m (449 ft 6 in) long. The ship has a range of 8,000 nautical miles (15,000 km; 9,200 mi) at 14 knots (26 km/h; 16 mph) with a top speed of 30 knots (56 km/h; 35 mph). The ship can have up to 220 personnel on board. The ship is also fitted to accommodate for one aircraft. The ship's flight deck can be used to service a SH-60J9(K) Seahawk helicopter.

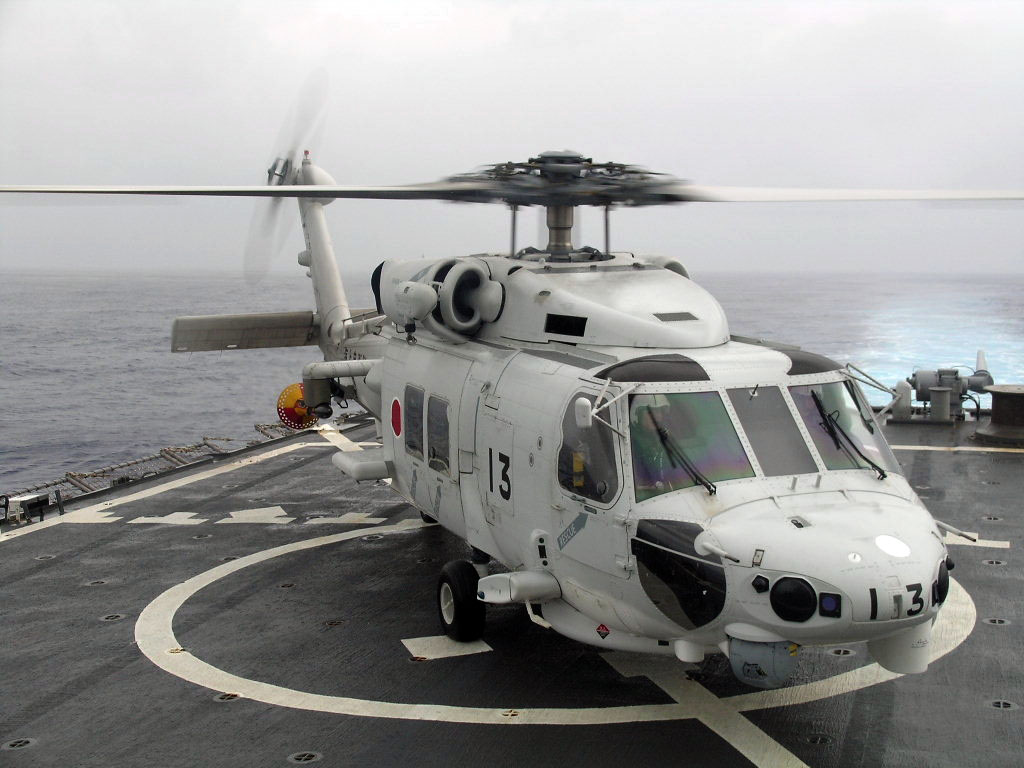
A SH-60J SeaHawk that can be used on Amagiri.

== History ==
Amagiri was laid down on March 3, 1986, launched on September 9, 1987, and commissioned on February 28, 1989.
