= OPS-9 =

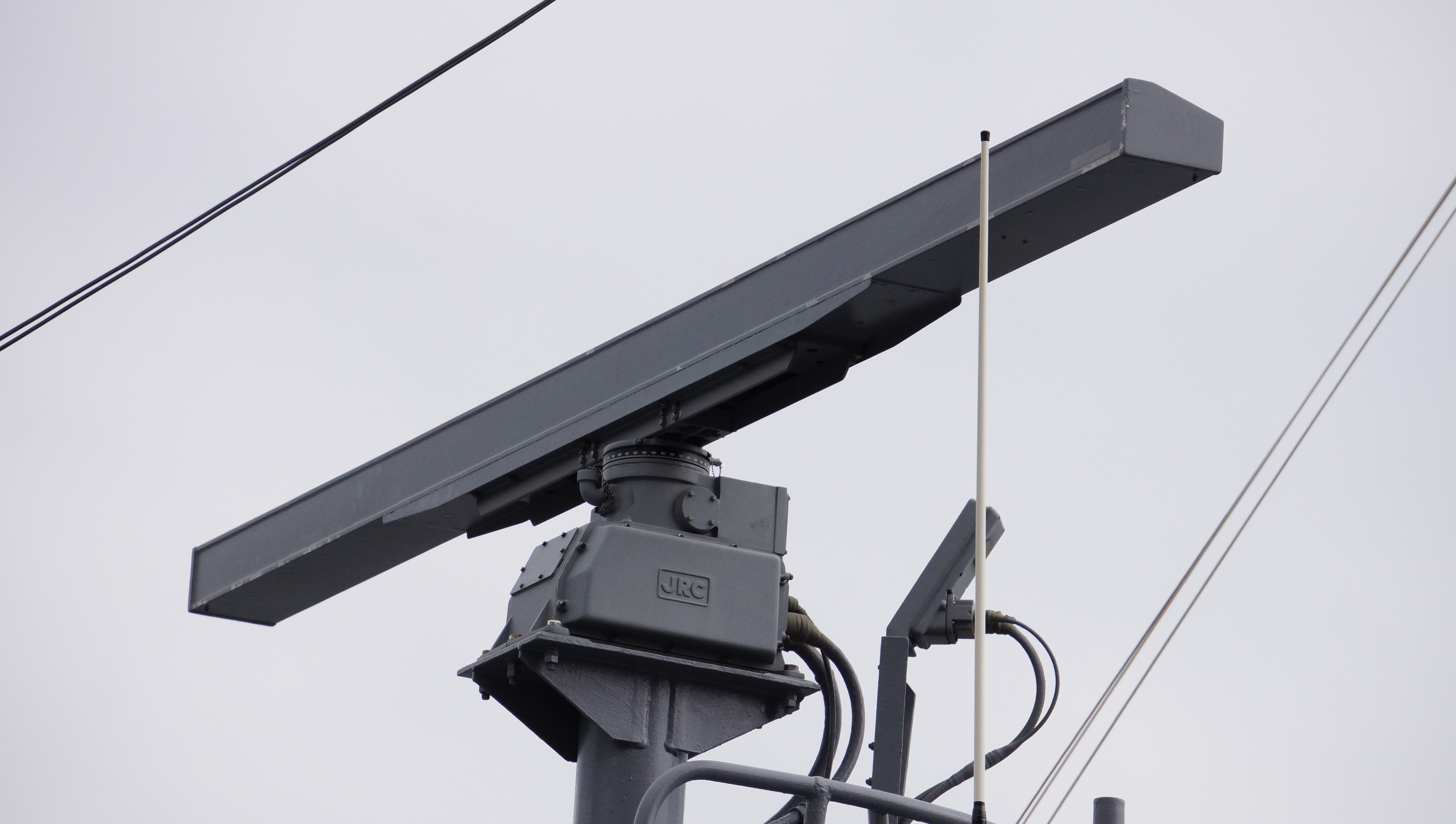
- OPS-39-Y aboard JS Makishima
- Country of origin: Japan
- Manufacturer: Fujitsu
- Introduced: 1966
- Type: 2D
- Frequency: X band
- Power: 20 kW

OPS-9 is a two-dimensional radar manufactured by Fujitsu. It is installed as an anti-water search radar on the Maritime Self-Defense Force's escort ship. Variations include OPS-9B and OPS-9C.

The model numbers of the Maritime Self-Defense Force's electronic devices, including this machine, are generally based on the naming rules for military electronic devices of the U.S. military. It is for radar mounted on surface vessels, for detection / distance direction measurement / search.

== Overview ==
This model was developed as a higher resolution X band radar for minesweepers, the successor to Oki Electric Industry's OPS-4. The development was to be carried out by Fujitsu, which was increasing its share of radar for fishing boats at that time. It is also said that British made Type 978 radar technology was introduced.

The feature of OPS-9 is that it has a total length of 4 meters, which is unusual for a waveguide slot array antenna. The waveguide slot array antenna has a structure in which slot holes for microwave emission / reception are provided at equal intervals on the side surface of the waveguide. At the time of oscillation, the microwaves emitted from each slot hole interfere with each other to form a sharp beam in the horizontal direction. This can be expected to improve the directional accuracy. In a general waveguide slot array antenna, the microwaves flowing through the waveguide are arranged so that they flow from end to end, but since this radar has a long overall length, the microwaves flowing through the waveguide during oscillation flow from the center. Arranged to flow towards both ends.

In addition to the prototype OPS-9, OPS-9B and OPS-9C were developed in sequence. Initially, the OPS-9 consisted of a transmitter / receiver, an antenna, an indicator, and a true direction indicator, but with the OPS-9B, the true direction indicator can be incorporated into the indicator and the direction information can be transmitted to the outside. The weight is also reduced by incorporating a synchro oscillator and making it a solid state.

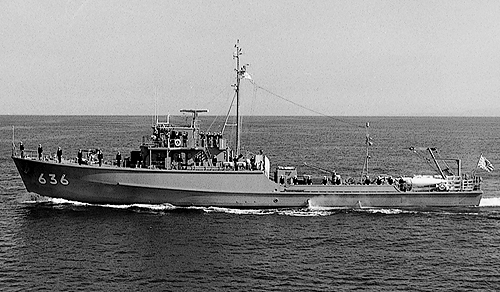
OPS-9 aboard JDS Teuri

=== On board ships ===
- Kasado-class minesweeper
- Takami-class minesweeper
- Hatsushima-class minesweeper
- Atsumi-class tank landing ship
- Yura-class utility landing ship
- JDS Hamana
- JDS Akashi
- JS Suma
- JS Kurihama

== OPS-39 ==
After being put into practical use in 1966, the OPS-9 was widely installed on auxiliary ships and support ships in addition to minesweepers, like the OPS-4. After that, in 1993, the advanced OPS-39 was developed by Japan Radio and became the successor to this machine. However, since OPS-20 and other nautical radars are currently deployed, the deployment of OPS-39 is generally limited to mine sweepers.

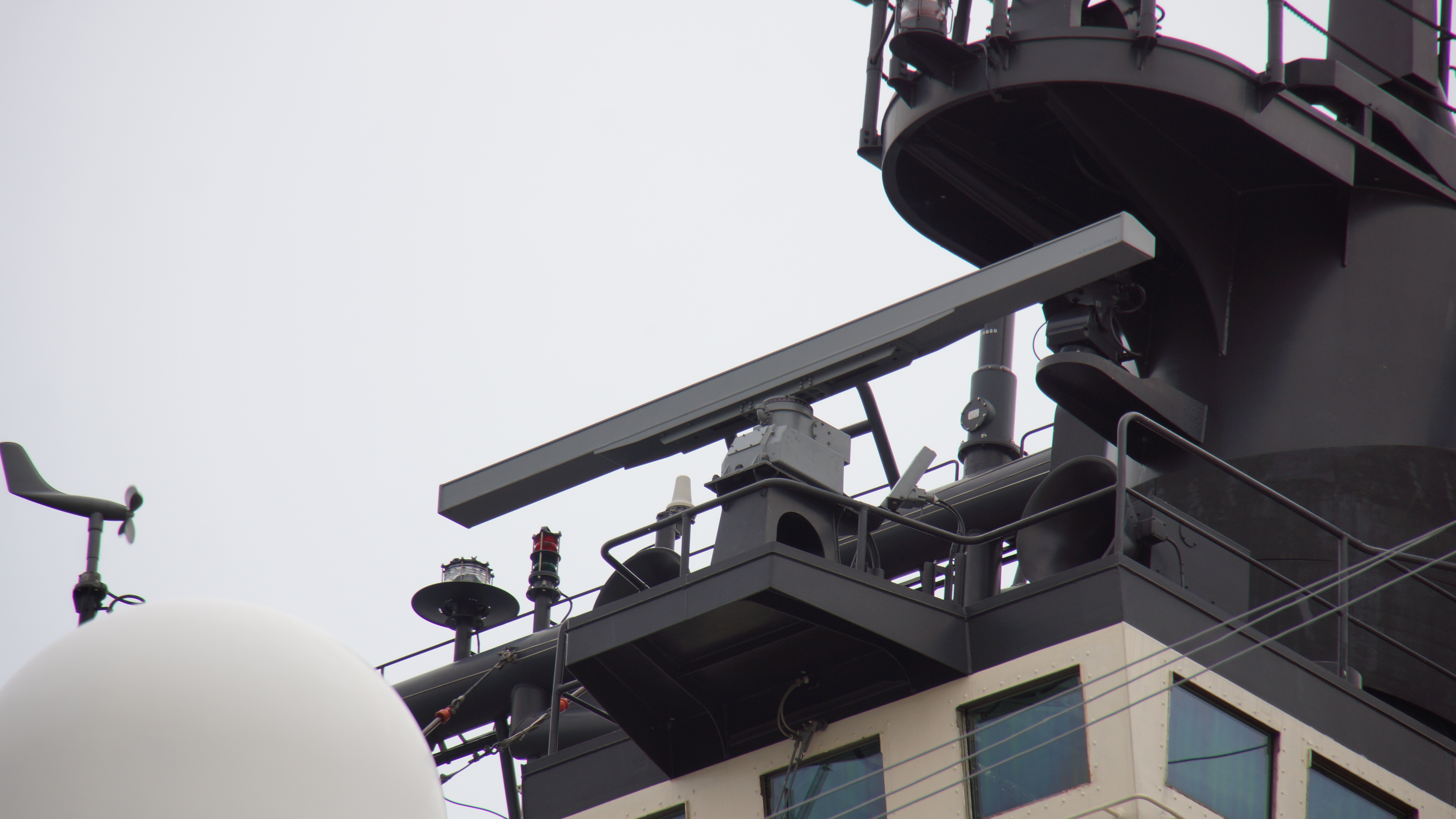
OPS-39D aboard Shirase

=== On board ships ===
- Uwajima-class minesweeper
- Sugashima-class minesweeper
- Hirashima-class minesweeper
- Enoshima-class minesweeper
- Yaeyama-class minesweeper
- Awaji-class minesweeper
- Shirase

== Gallery ==
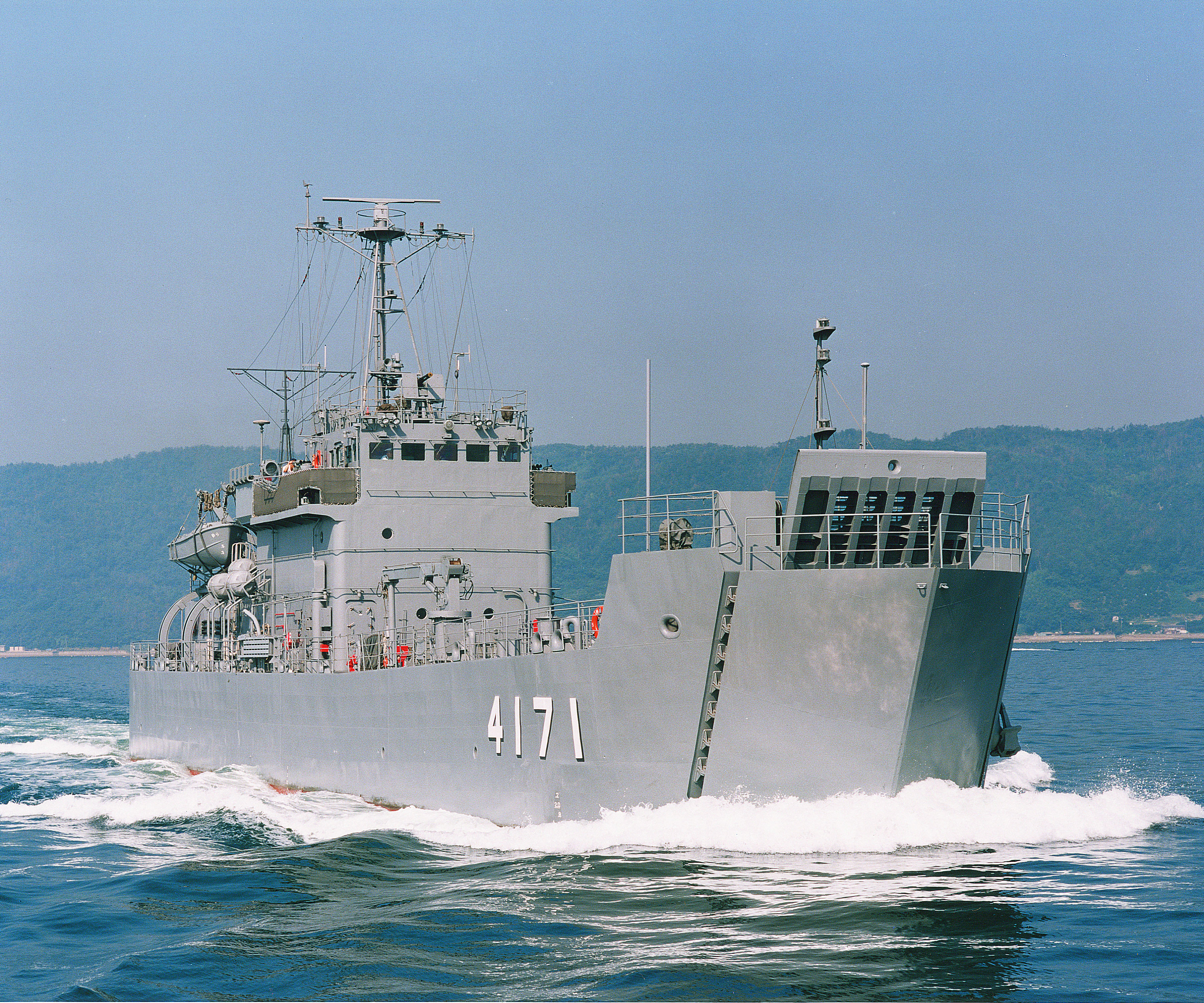
OPS-9 aboard JS Yura

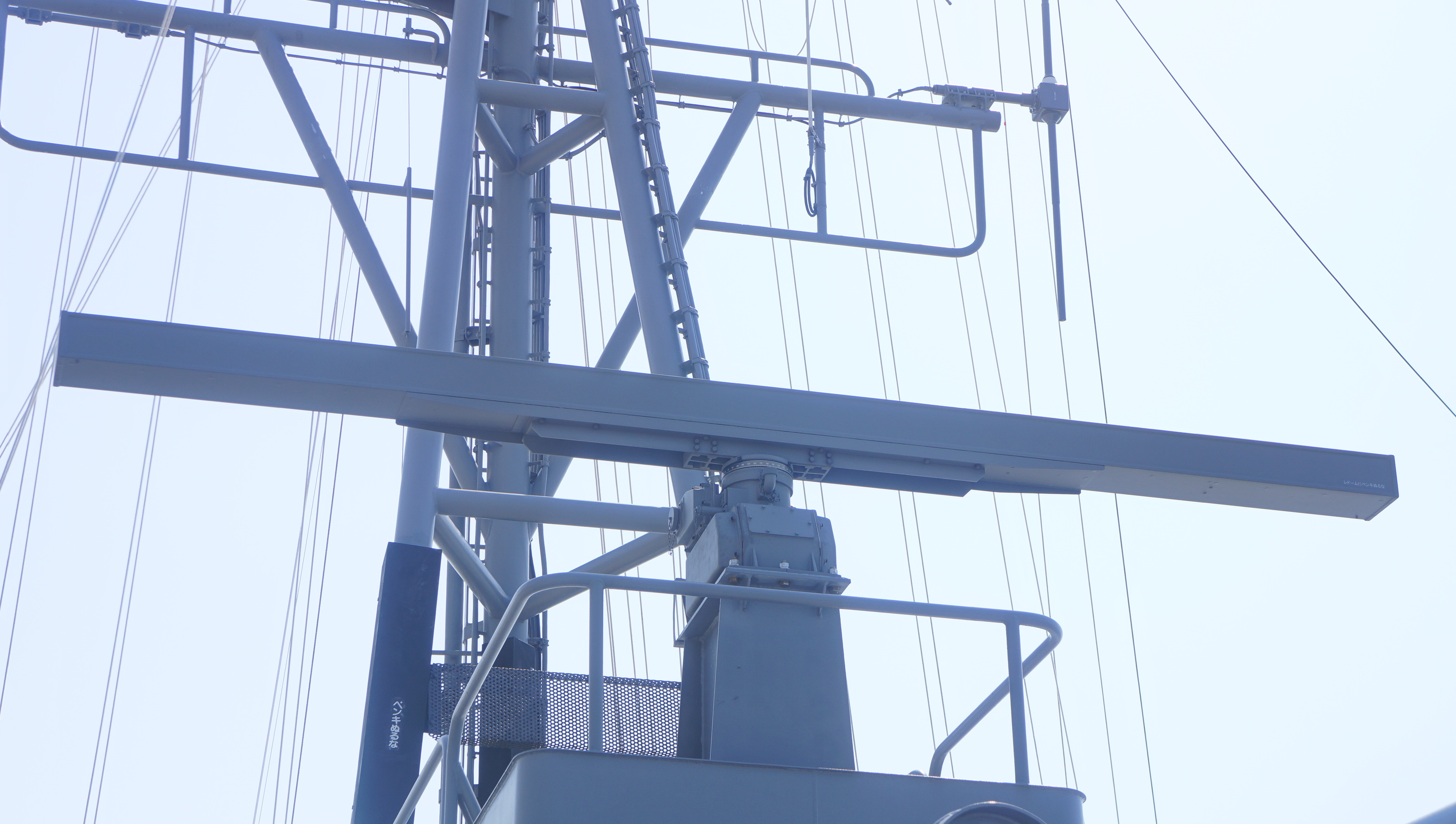
OPS-39-Y aboard JS Naoshima
