= Enoshima-class minesweeper =

Coastal minesweepers of JMSDF

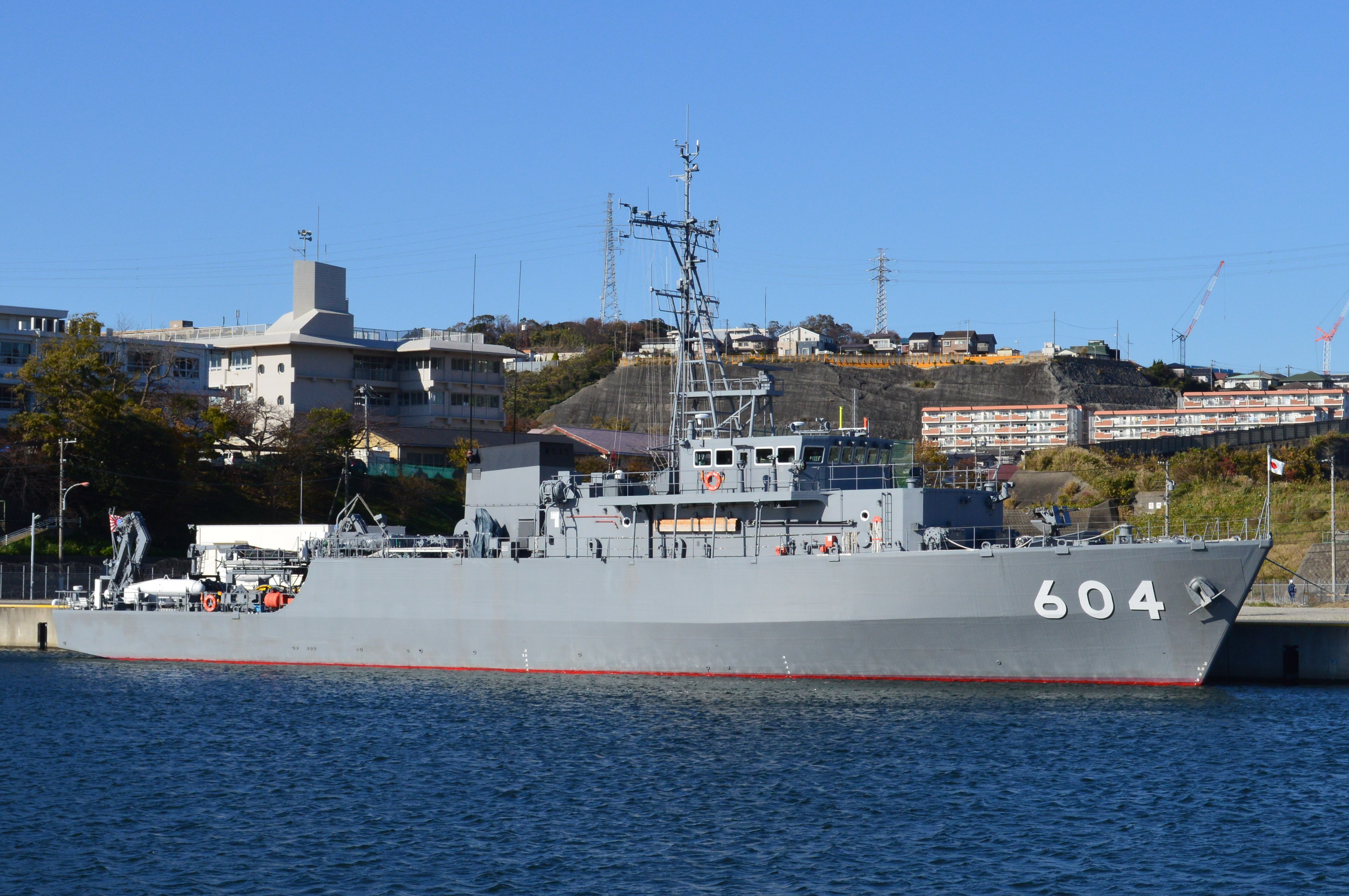
- JS Enoshima on 29 November 2013

Class overview
- Name: Enoshima
- Builders: USC, Keihin; JMU, Yokohama
- Preceded by: Harishima class
- Built: 2009–2013
- In commission: 2012–present
- Planned: 3
- Completed: 3
- Active: 3

General characteristics
- Type: Minesweeper
- Displacement: 570 t (560 long tons) standard; 650 t (640 long tons) full load
- Length: 57 m (187 ft 0 in)
- Beam: 9.8 m (32 ft 2 in)
- Depth: 4.4 m (14 ft 5 in)
- Propulsion: 2 × Mitsubishi 6NMU diesel electric engines; 2 × shafts
- Speed: 14 kn (26 km/h; 16 mph)
- Complement: 48
- Sensors & processing systems: OPS-39 surface-search radar; OYQ-201 sonar; ZQS-4 sonar
- Armament: 1 × single JM61R-MS 20 mm gun

The Enoshima class is a class of coastal minesweepers of the Japan Maritime Self-Defense Force (JMSDF).

== Development ==
From lessons learned from the 1991 deployment of the Japanese Self-Defense Forces to the Persian Gulf, the Japan Maritime Self-Defense Force (JMSDF) took the inspiration from the Royal Navy's Sandown-class minehunter, which was built after the 1994 plan to enhance mine clearance capabilities. However, since the Sandown class is essentially a minesweeper without actual minesweeping capability, and given that many waters around Japan have muddy seabeds which can complicate minesweeping operations by obscuring or interfering with mine detection, the JMSDF found it unacceptable to abandon minesweeping functionality. To address this, the Enoshima class were equipped with Australian-made Dyad Influence Minesweeping Systems (DIMS), which are sensitive minesweepers. However, due to magnetic management issues, it was decided that the minesweeping equipment would not be permanently installed but instead deployed from a mother ship at sea as needed. This approach reduces the vessel's magnetic signature when not actively sweeping mines, minimizing the risk of prematurely triggering magnetic mines.

However, it introduced operational delays, logistical challenges, and reduced flexibility, limiting the vessel's ability to conduct immediate or independent minesweeping operations. This resulted in significant operational restrictions and limited mobility.

For these reasons, the Enoshima class was developed as a new type of minesweeper, featuring a domestically designed system with performance equivalent to the foreign-made minesweeping system used in the Sugashima class.

== Ships in the class ==
Pennant no.	Name	Builders	Laid down	Launched	Commissioned	Home port
MSC-604	Enoshima	Universal Shipbuilding Corporation, Keihin	14 May 2009	25 October 2010	21 March 2012	Yokosuka
MSC-605	Chichijima	Universal Shipbuilding Corporation, Keihin	24 May 2010	24 November 2011	21 March 2013	Yokosuka
MSC-606	Hatsushima	Japan Marine United, Yokohama	26 April 2012	6 December 2013	19 March 2015	Yokosuka
