= Japan Maritime Self-Defense Force =

Navy branch of the Japan Self-Defense Forces

- 海上自衛隊 (Japanese)
- Emblem of the Japan Maritime Self-Defense Force
- Founded: 1 July 1954; 72 years ago
- Country: Japan
- Type: Navy
- Role: Naval warfare
- Size: 50,800 personnel 160 ships 346 aircraft
- Part of: Japan Self-Defense Forces
- Garrison/HQ: Ichigaya, Shinjuku, Tokyo, Japan
- March: Gunkan kōshinkyoku (Warship March)
- Fleet: 2 light aircraft carriers 2 helicopter carriers 24 submarines 36 destroyers 8 frigates 6 destroyer escorts 4 landing ships 30 minesweepers 6 patrol boats 8 training ships (21 auxiliaries)
- Website: mod.go.jp/msdf

Commanders
- Commander-in-Chief: Prime Minister Sanae Takaichi
- Minister of Defense: Shinjirō Koizumi
- Chief of Staff, Joint Staff: General Hiroaki Uchikura
- Chief of Staff, Maritime Self-Defense Force: Admiral Akira Saitō

Insignia
- Commissioning pennant

- Ensign

The Japan Maritime Self-Defense Force (Japanese: 海上自衛隊, Hepburn: Kaijō Jieitai), abbreviated JMSDF (海自, Kaiji), also simply known as the Japanese Navy, is the naval branch of the Japan Self-Defense Forces, tasked with the naval defense of Japan. The JMSDF was formed on 1 July 1954, 9 years after the dissolution of the Imperial Japanese Navy (IJN) in 1945, following their defeat in World War II. The JMSDF has a fleet of 160 ships, 346 aircraft and 50,800 personnel.

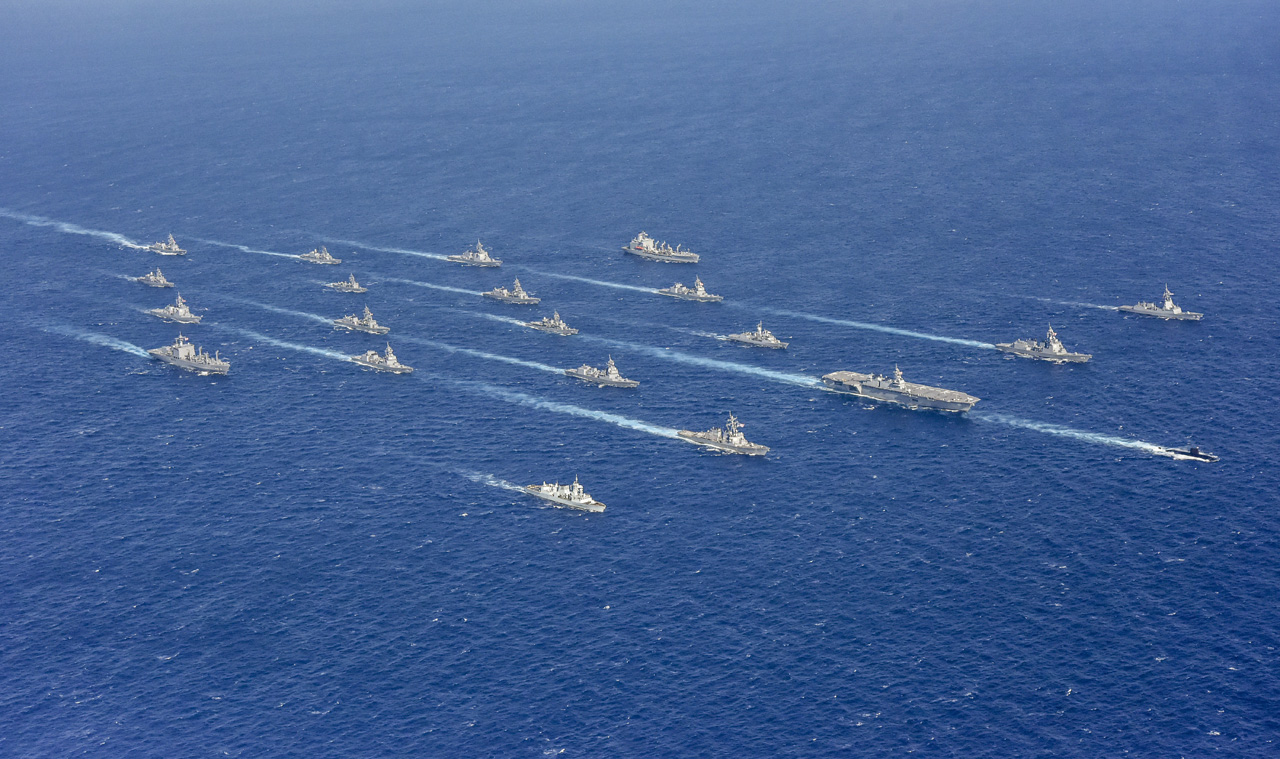
JMSDF during fleet maneuvers in 2019

== History ==
=== Origin ===
Following Japan's defeat in World War II, the Imperial Japanese Navy was dissolved by the Potsdam Declaration acceptance. Ships were disarmed, and some of them, such as the battleship Nagato, were taken by the Allied Powers as reparations. The remaining ships were used for repatriation of the Japanese soldiers from abroad and also for minesweeping in the area around Japan, initially under the control of the Second Bureau of the Demobilization Ministry. The minesweeping fleet was eventually transferred to the newly formed Maritime Safety Agency, which helped maintain the resources and expertise of the navy.

Japan's 1947 Constitution was drawn up after the conclusion of the war, which contained Article 9, which specified that "The Japanese people forever renounce war as a sovereign right of the nation and the threat or use of force as a means of settling international disputes." The prevalent view in Japan is that this article allows for military forces to be kept for the purposes of self-defense. Due to Cold War pressures, the United States was also happy for Japan to provide part of its own defense, rather than have it fully rely on American forces.

In 1952, the Safety Security Force was formed within the Maritime Safety Agency, incorporating the minesweeping fleet and other military vessels, mainly destroyers, given by the United States. In 1954, the SSF was separated, and the JMSDF was formally created as the naval branch of the Japan Self-Defense Forces (JSDF), following the passage of the 1954 Self-Defense Forces Law.

The first ships in the JMSDF were former U.S. Navy destroyers, transferred to Japanese control in 1954. In 1956, the JMSDF received its first domestically produced destroyer since World War II, Harukaze. Due to the Cold War threat posed by the Soviet Navy's sizable and powerful submarine fleet, the JMSDF was primarily tasked with an anti-submarine role.

=== Post-Cold War ===
Following the end of the Cold War, the role of the JMSDF has vastly changed. In 1991, after international pressure, the JMSDF dispatched four minesweepers, a fleet oiler (JDS Tokiwa) and a minesweeping tender (JDS Hayase) to the Persian Gulf in the aftermath of the Gulf War, under the name of Operation Gulf Dawn, to clear mines sown by Saddam Hussein's defending forces. Starting with a mission to Cambodia in 1993 when JSDF personnel were supported by JDS Towada, it has been active in a number of UN-led peacekeeping operations throughout Asia.

In 1993, the JMSDF commissioned its first Aegis-equipped destroyer, Kongō. It has also been active in joint naval exercises with other countries, such as the United States. The JMSDF has dispatched a number of its destroyers on a rotating schedule to the Indian Ocean in an escort role for allied vessels as part of the UN-led Operation Enduring Freedom.

=== 21st century ===
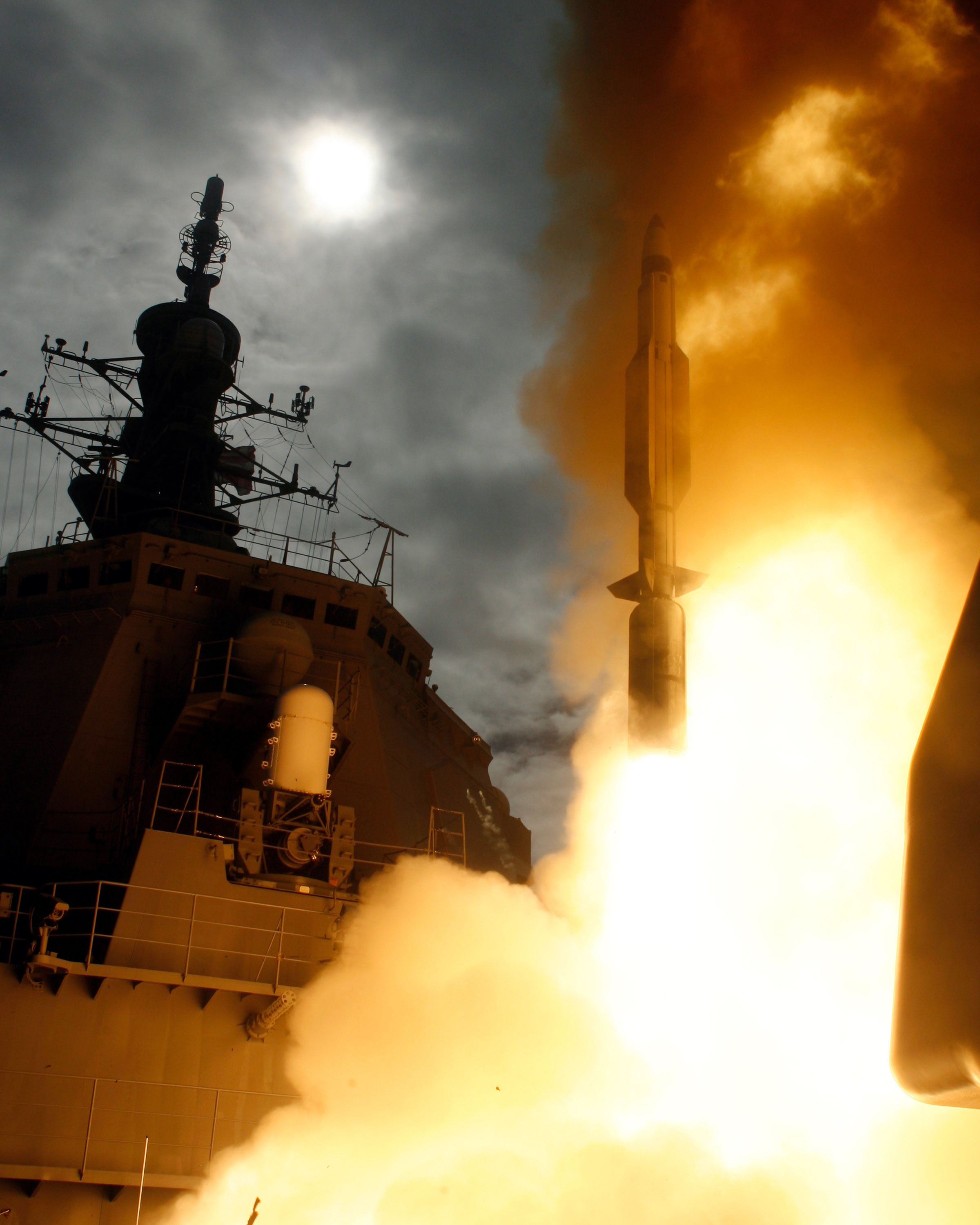
A RIM-161 Standard Missile 3 launched from JS Kongō, an Aegis destroyer

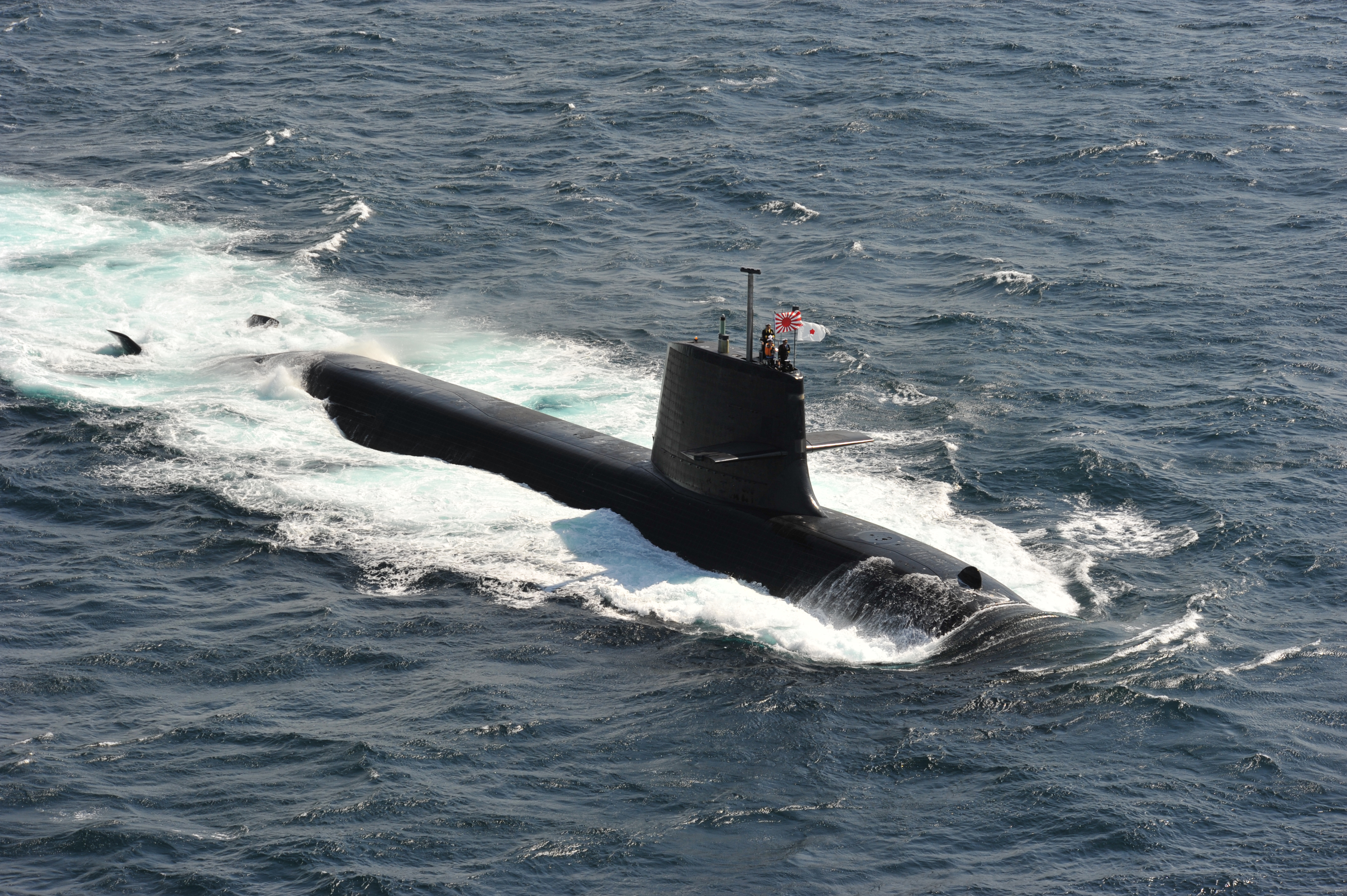
The Sōryū-class attack submarine Kenryū

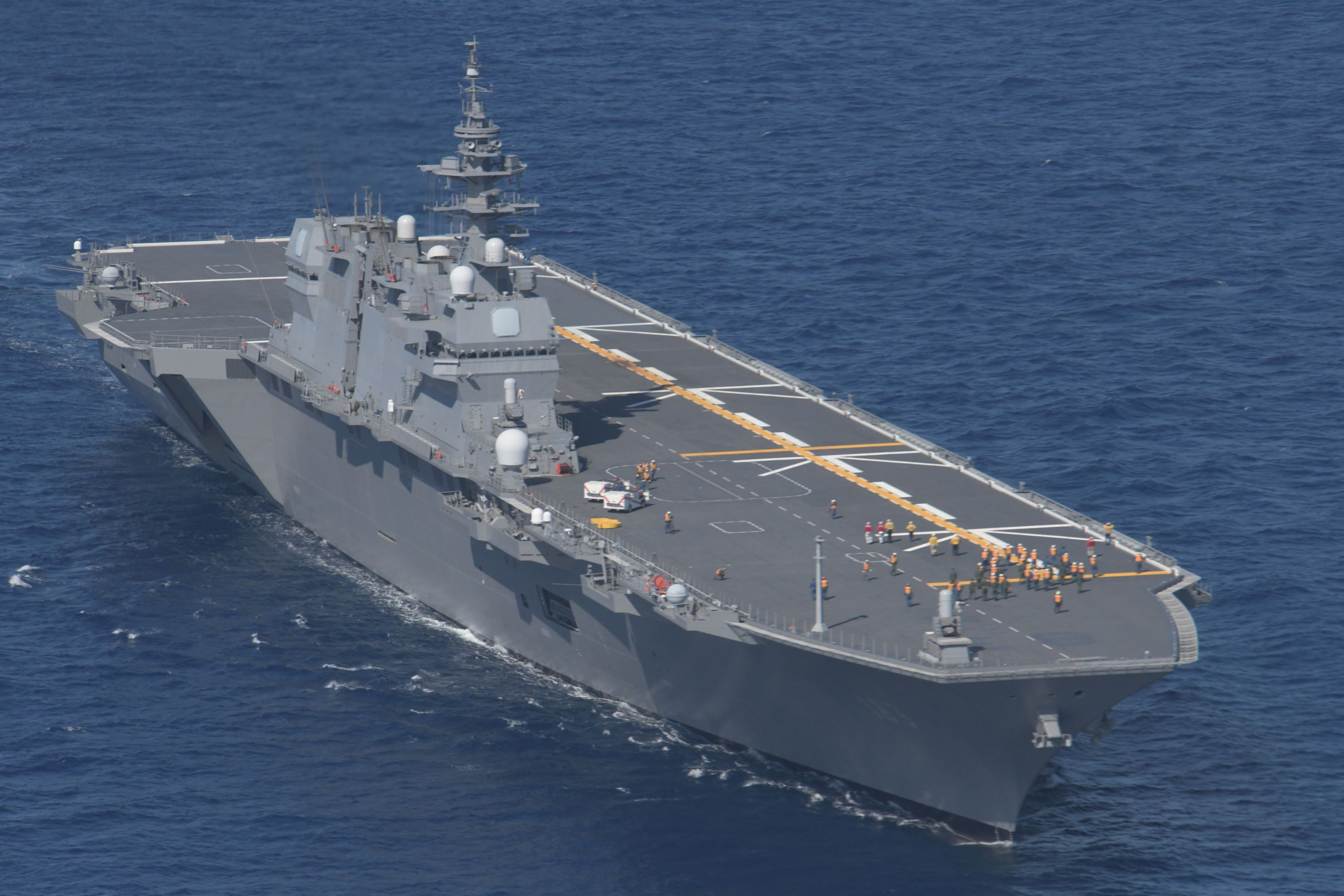
JS Izumo, a multi-role aircraft-carrying cruiser being refitted to carry F-35B stealth fighters

The JMSDF, along with the Japan Coast Guard, has also been active in preventing North Korean infiltrators from reaching Japan and on 22 December 2001, engaged and sank a North Korean spy ship in the Battle of Amami-Ōshima.

In 2002, the JMSDF deployed ships to the Arabian Sea in support of Operation Anaconda during the War in Afghanistan.

In August 2003, a new "helicopter carrier" class was ordered, the Hyūga-class helicopter destroyer. Due to the size and features of the ship, including a full-length flight deck, it was classified as a helicopter carrier by Lloyd's Register — similar to the United Kingdom's HMS Ocean. The Self-Defense Forces are not allowed to possess ICBMs, strategic bombers, or "attack aircraft carriers". However, according to the Japanese government's definition, "attack aircraft carriers" refer specifically to carriers designed solely for nuclear bombers to conduct nuclear strikes. Aircraft carriers equipped with helicopters, conventional fighter jets or attack aircraft—whether they are small light carriers or large nuclear-powered carriers—are not considered illegal.

With an increase in tensions with North Korea following the 1993 test of the Nodong-1 missile and the 1998 test of the Taepodong-1 missile over northern Japan, the JMSDF has increased its efforts in air defense. A ship-based anti-ballistic missile system was successfully test-fired on 18 December 2007 and has been installed on Japan's Aegis-equipped destroyers.

In November 2009, the JMSDF announced plans for a larger "helicopter carrier", the Izumo-class helicopter destroyer. In 2025, these vessels were re-classified as "multi-role aircraft-carrying cruisers" as part of their conversion to operate F-35B V/STOL fighters. This made them de facto aircraft carriers. To avoid controversy, the ruling parties initially classified the vessels "multi-purpose operation destroyers" and then, in 2025, as "multi-role aircraft-carrying cruisers". The first of these ships was laid down in 2012 and was launched on 6 August 2013. Two vessels of the class were in service as of 2025.

The submarine fleet of the JMSDF consists of some of the most technologically advanced diesel-electric submarines in the world. This is due to careful defense planning in which the submarines are routinely retired from service ahead of schedule and replaced by more advanced models. In 2010 it was announced that the Japanese submarine fleet would be increased in size for the first time in 36 years.

After a meeting between the Japanese Foreign Minister Fumio Kishida (Second Abe Cabinet) and U.S. Ambassador to Japan Caroline Kennedy on 4 March 2014, the Japanese Defense Ministry and U.S. Department of Defense announced they would hold studies for the joint development of the littoral vessel under the bilateral Mutual Defense Assistance Agreement. The vessel is planned to be a high-speed trimaran designed for operations in shallow coastal waters capable of carrying helicopters, possibly a lighter variant of the American 3,000-tonne (3,000-long-ton) littoral combat ship.

The study was conducted in response to the growth of the Chinese People's Liberation Army Navy and budgetary issues with the U.S. military that may affect their ability to operate in the Pacific. The J-LCS would be used to intervene during Chinese ship incursions near the Senkaku Islands and other contested areas in the East China Sea, and possibly counter similar Chinese vessels like the Type 056 corvette and Type 022 missile boat. A 1,000-tonne (980-long-ton) J-LCS with an enlarged hull could operate the SH-60K anti-submarine helicopter or the MCH-101 airborne mine countermeasures (AMCM) helicopter.

On May 1, 2017, JS Izumo was dispatched to protect a U.S. Navy supply vessel in the Pacific. This was the first time the JMSDF was used to defend allied vessels since the 2016 amendment to the Japanese Constitution.

Japan christened the 84 m (275 ft 7 in) long, 2,950 t (2,900-long-ton) JS Ōryū submarine on October 4, 2018. It is Japan's first submarine powered by lithium-ion batteries and was developed by Mitsubishi Heavy Industries. It was commissioned in March 2020.

Japan and the United States conducted the biggest military exercise around Japan in the biennial Keen Sword from 29 October to 2 November 2018. It included a total of 57,000 sailors, marines and airmen. 47,000 service members were from the JSDF and 10,000 from the U.S. Armed Forces. A naval supply ship and a frigate of the Royal Canadian Navy also participated. There were simulations of air combat, ballistic missile defense and amphibious landings.

On 23 May 2019, retired MSDF vice-admiral Toshiyuki Ito stated that Japan requires at least four Izumo-class destroyers to be viable for real naval combat operations. He said "If you only have two vessels, you can only use them for training personnel for taking off and landing operations, so this plan doesn't make sense for MSDF officers, frankly speaking." As aircraft carriers, the Izumo-class destroyers are relatively small, only able to carry approximately 10 F-35Bs, which Ito argued were too few to provide effective air defense.

In 2019, the National Diet of Japan approved the order of 42 STOVL Lockheed Martin F-35 Lightning II aircraft in addition to 135 F-35A model conventional takeoff and landing fighters for the Japan Air Self-Defense Force to operate from their land bases; the F-35B is same model aircraft that the US Marines operate from US Navy aircraft carriers and amphibious assault ships, the US Marines also plan to fly from the Japanese Izumo class after the STOVL modifications and refit.

On October 14, 2020, the 3,000-ton submarine Taigei was unveiled. This is the first vessel of the Taigei class and the 22nd submarine vessel of the JMSDF. The Taigei entered service in 2022, and the second ship of the class, Hakugei, was commissioned in 2023.

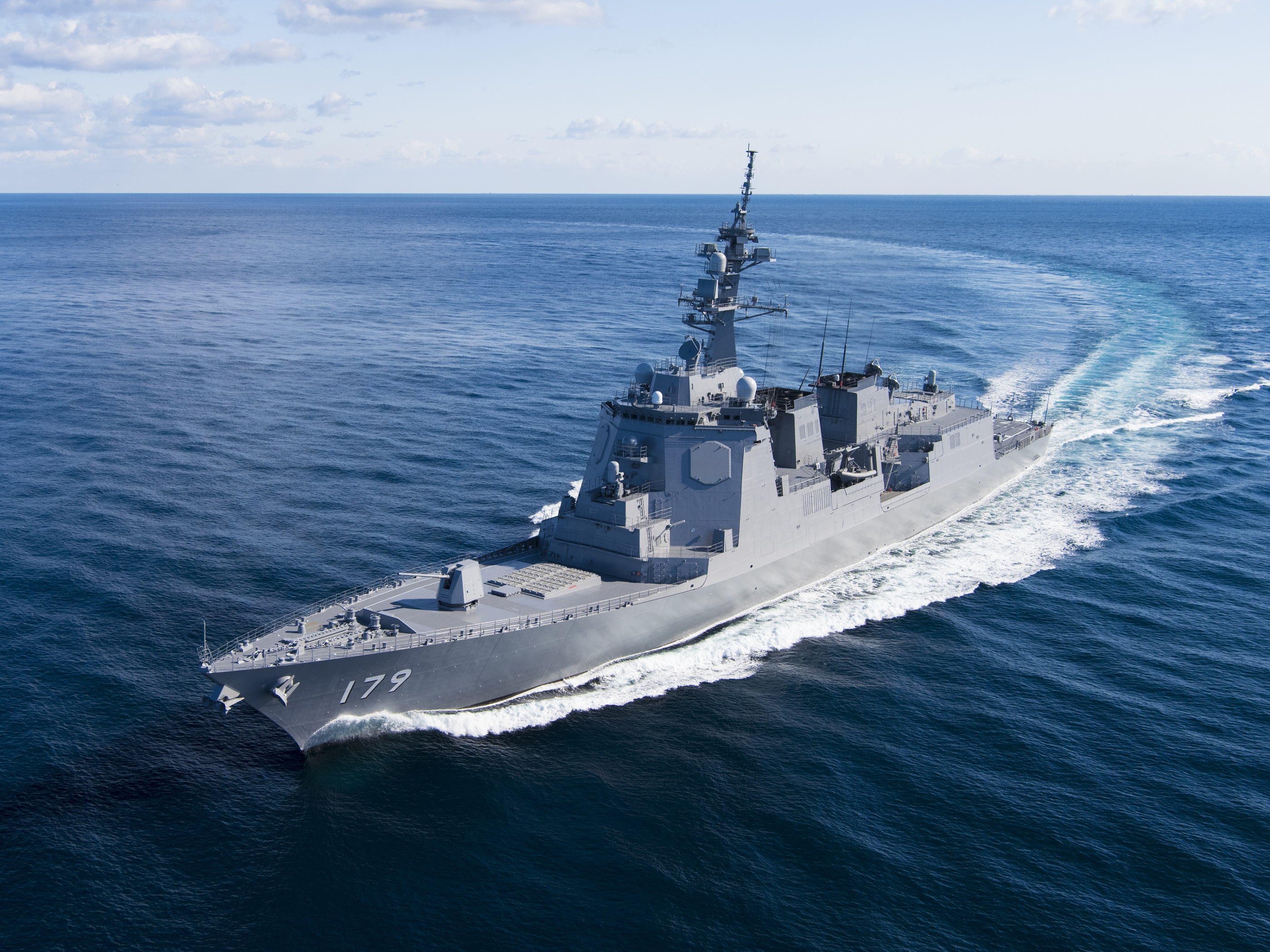
Aegis guided-missile destroyer destroyer JS Maya

On 30 June 2022, the Japan Ministry of Defense announced the construction of 12 offshore patrol vessels (OPVs) by Japan Marine United Corporation (JMU) for the Japan Maritime Self-Defense Force (JMSDF) at a cost of ¥ 9 billion (US$66 million) per ship. The purpose of this OPV program is to provide enhanced maritime security, particularly around the southwestern Ryukyu Islands, including the disputed Senkaku/Diaoyu Islands in the East China Sea, by boosting JMSDF patrol activities in the region. These vessels are highly automated and configurable to meet a wide range of missions involving "enhanced steady-state intelligence, surveillance, and reconnaissance (ISR) in the waters around Japan". Under the contract, JMU is charged with delivering the 12 vessels to the JMSDF from fiscal year 2023, which starts on April 1, 2023.

On August 31, 2022, the Japan Ministry of Defense announced that JMSDF will operate two "Aegis system equipped ships" (イージス・システム搭載艦 in Japanese) to replace the earlier plan of Aegis Ashore installations, commissioning one by the end of fiscal year 2027, and the other by the end of FY2028. The budget for design and other related expenses are to be submitted in the form of "item requests", without specific amounts, and the initial procurement of the lead items are expected to clear legislation by FY2023. Construction is to begin in the following year of FY2024. At 20,000 tons each, both vessels will be the largest surface combatant warships operated by the JMSDF, and according to Popular Mechanics, they will "arguably [be] the largest deployable surface warships in the world".

On 16 November 2022, the guided-missile destroyer Maya fired an SM-3 Block IIA missile, successfully intercepting the target outside the atmosphere in the first launch of the missile from a Japanese warship. On 18 November 2022, the Haguro likewise fired an SM-3 Block IB missile with a successful hit outside the atmosphere. Both test firings were conducted at the Pacific Missile Range Facility on Kauaʻi Island, Hawaii, in cooperation with the U.S. Navy and U.S. Missile Defense Agency. This was the first time the two ships conducted SM-3 firings in the same time period, and the tests validated the ballistic missile defense capabilities of Japan's newest Maya-class destroyers.

On 16 December 2022, Second Kishida Reshuffled Cabinet approved a trio of defense-related policy documents, including its new National Security Strategy (NSS or 国家安全保障戦略), the strategic guideline document for the Japanese government's policies regarding diplomacy, defense, and economic security for the next decade. Based on the NSS, the National Defense Strategy (国家防衛戦略) outlined Japan's defense policy goals and the means to achieve them while the Defense Buildup Program (防衛力整備計画) outlined the scale of the introduction of specific defense equipment within the budgetary objectives. According to the Defense Buildup Program, the Japan Maritime Self-Defense Force (JMSDF) will increase the number of Aegis-equipped guided-missile destroyers (DDG) from the current eight to ten, as well as two Aegis system-equipped vessels (ASEV) to be deployed in ballistic missile defense (BMD) operations. By the end of the decade, the JMSDF will operate 12 ships equipped with Aegis Weapon System (AWS) and likewise plans to replace its fleet of older, less capable destroyers and destroyer escorts with Mogami-class frigates.

== Capabilities ==
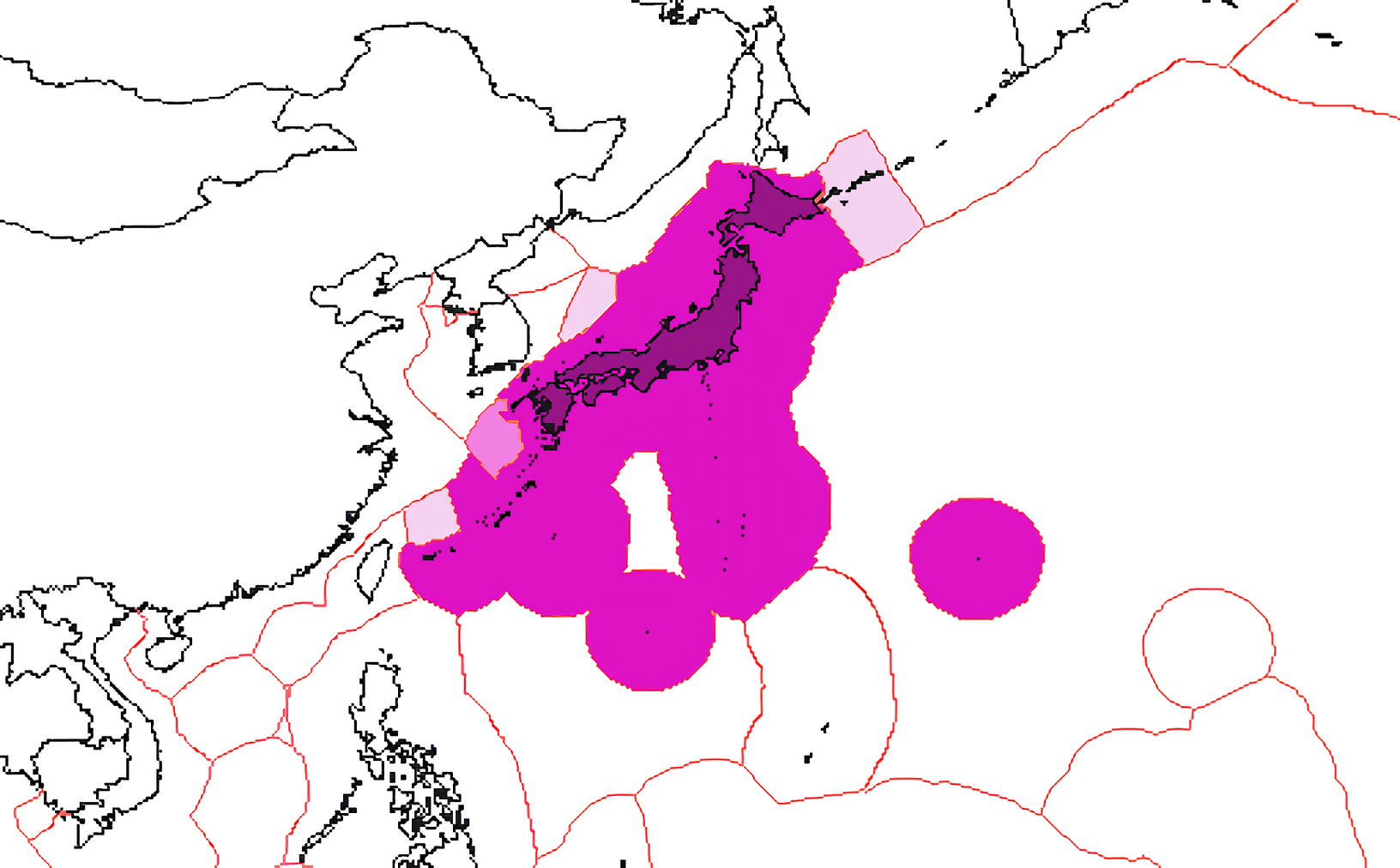
Japan's exclusive economic zones: Japan's EEZ Joint regime with Republic of Korea EEZ claimed by Japan, disputed by others

The JMSDF has an official strength of 50,000 personnel, but presently numbers around 50,800 active personnel.

As a result of continuing effective defense investment due to Japan's economic development and an end to the Cold War, the JMSDF became the world's fourth largest navy by total tonnage by 2000. Japan has the eighth largest Exclusive Economic Zone (EEZ) in the world, and the JMSDF is responsible for protecting this large area. As an island nation, dependent on maritime trade for the majority of its resources, including food and raw materials, maritime operations are a very important aspect of Japanese defense policy.

The JMSDF is known in particular for its anti-submarine warfare and minesweeping capabilities. Defense planners believe the most effective approach to combating hostile submarines entails mobilizing all available weapons, including surface combatants, submarines, patrol planes, and helicopters. They are also known to operate at least fourteen listening stations all over the country that have ELINT and marine surveillance radar warning systems.

Historically, the Japan Air Self-Defense Force (JASDF) has been relied on to provide air cover at sea, a role that is subordinate to the JASDF's primary mission of air defense of the home islands. Extended patrols over sea lanes are beyond the JASDF's current capabilities.

The Japanese fleet's capacity to provide ship-based antiaircraft warfare protection is limited by the absence of full-sized aircraft carriers, though its destroyers and frigates equipped with the Aegis combat system provide a formidable capability in antiaircraft and antimissile warfare. Additionally, the deployment of F-35B V/STOL fighters on the Izumo-class aircraft-carrying cruisers are force multipliers for the Japanese fleet, allowing force projection of Japan's sizable surface combatant force far from home waters. Acquiring such capabilities has been contentious in the context of Japan's "passive" defense policy after World War II.

Long-range strike capability will be introduced as soon as Tomahawk cruise missiles are deployed on JMSDF destroyers.

== Activities ==
=== International activities ===
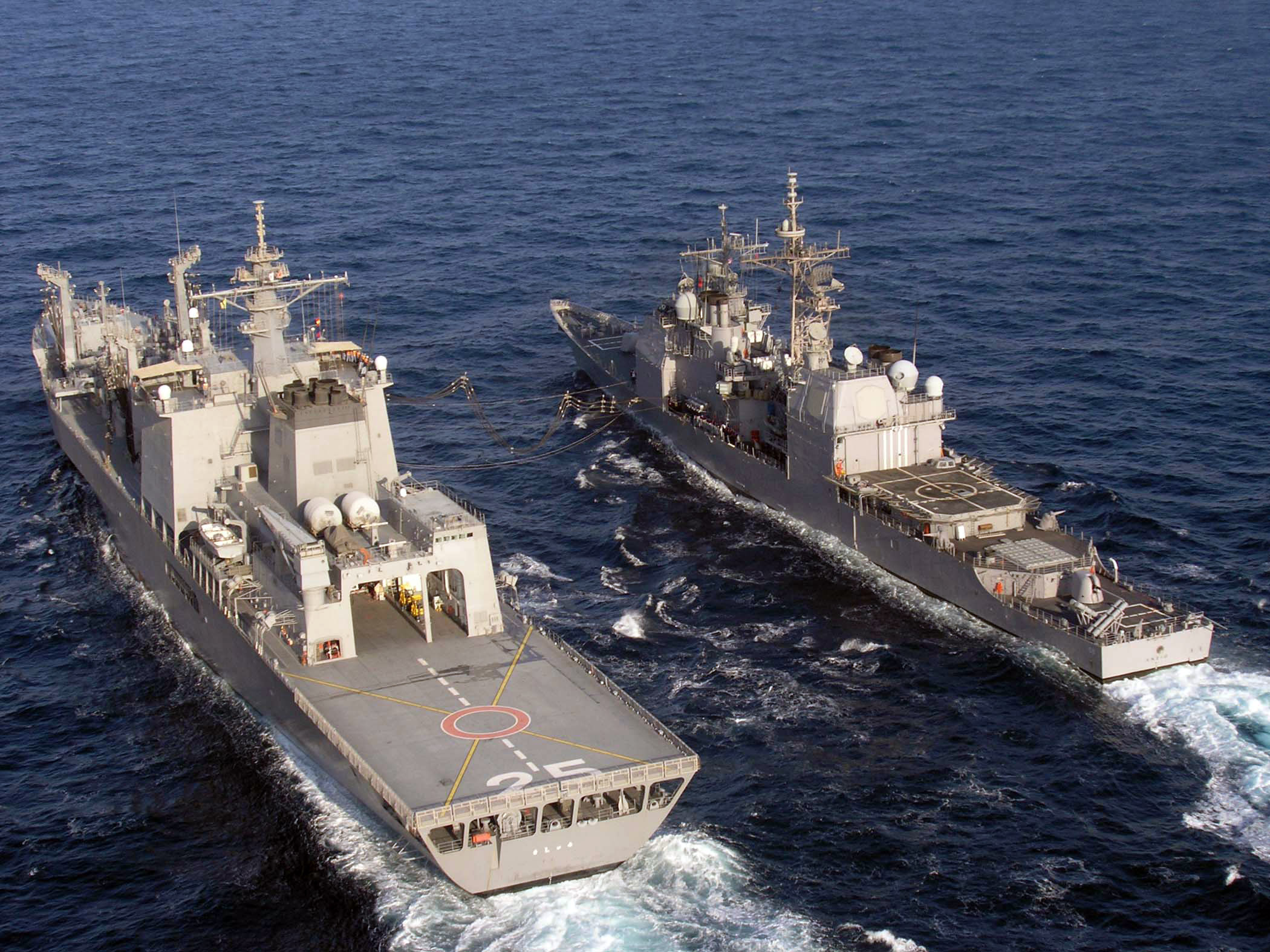
The Japanese fast combat support ship JS Mashu (left) conducts a replenishment at sea (RAS) with the guided-missile cruiser USS Anzio in the Arabian Sea, November 2006

==== Mission in the Indian Ocean ====
Destroyers and combat support ships of Japan Maritime Self-Defense Force were dispatched to the Indian Ocean from 2001 to 2008 to participate in OEF-MIO (Operation Enduring Freedom-Maritime Interdiction Operation). Their mission is to prevent the marine transportation of illegal weapons and ammunition, and the drugs which fund terrorist activity. Since 2004, the JMSDF has provided ships of foreign forces with fuel for their ships and ship-based helicopters, as well as freshwater.

This was the third time Japanese military vessels had been dispatched overseas since World War II, following the deployments of mine-sweeping units during the Korean War and the Persian Gulf War. The law enabling the mission expired on 2 November 2007, and the operation was temporarily canceled due to a veto of a new bill authorizing the mission by the opposition-controlled upper chamber of the Japanese Diet.

In January 2010, the defense minister ordered the JMSDF to return from the Indian Ocean, fulfilling a government pledge to end the eight-year refueling mission. Prime Minister Yukio Hatoyama refused to renew the law authorizing the mission, ignoring requests from the American government for continuation. Both the Western alliance country typified by the Royal Australian Navy and the Royal Danish Navy, doing friendship activities in the Indian Ocean.

==== Mission in Somalia ====
In May 2010, Japan announced its intention to build a permanent naval base in Djibouti, from which it will conduct operations to protect merchant shipping from Somali pirates.

==== Military exercises and exchanges ====
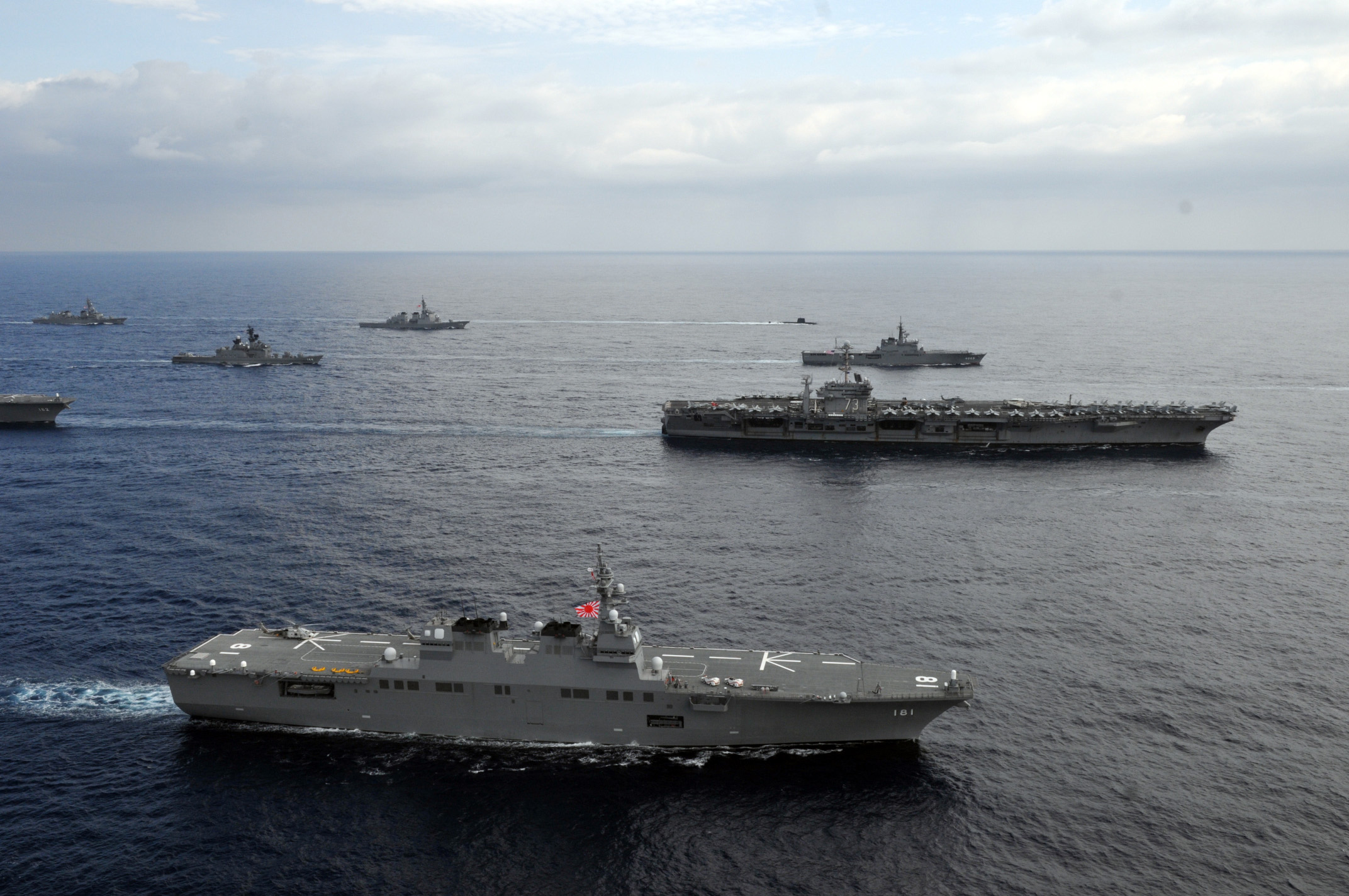
JS Hyūga, USS George Washington and JS Kunisaki in formation with other JMSDF ships at the culmination of Exercise Keen Sword 2013, East China Sea

The JMSDF and the U.S. Navy frequently carry out joint exercises and "U.S. Navy officials have claimed that they have a closer daily relationship with the JMSDF than any other navy in the world". The JMSDF participates in RIMPAC, the annual multi-national military exercise near Hawaii that has been hosted by the U.S. Navy since 1980. The JMSDF dispatched a ship to the Russian Vladivostok harbor in July 1996 to participate in the Russian Navy's 300th Anniversary Naval Review. In return, Admiral Vinogradov, an Udaloy-class destroyer, called at Tokyo Bay in June 1997. The JMSDF has also conducted joint naval exercises with the Indian Navy.

- RIMPAC: Japan Maritime Self-Defense Force participated in RIMPAC after 1980.
- Pacific Shield (PSI): The Japan Maritime Self-Defense Force has participated in Pacific Shield after 2004; and in 2007, the Japan Maritime Self-Defense Force hosted the exercise.
- Pacific Reach: The Japan Maritime Self-Defense Force has participated in the bi-annual submarine rescue exercise since 2000. In 2002, the Japan Maritime Self-Defense Force hosted the exercise.
- Navy to Navy Talks: The Japan Maritime Self-Defense Force holds regular naval conferences with its counterparts of Indonesia, Malaysia, Australia, the United Kingdom, and the United States of America.
- AEGIS Ballistic Missile Defense FTM: The Japan Maritime Self-Defense Force has participated in the FTM after FTM-10. The Japan Maritime Self-Defense Force carried out JFTM-1 in December 2007.
- The Japan Maritime Self-Defense Force participates in the United States Navy's Personnel Exchange Program (PEP) in which officers and enlisted personnel from each country serve fully integrated into the other country's navy for two years.
- Keen Sword is the biggest biennial military exercise around Japan. The participants are primarily Japan and the United States.

=== JMSDF Aegis Afloat ===
==== Operational concept ====
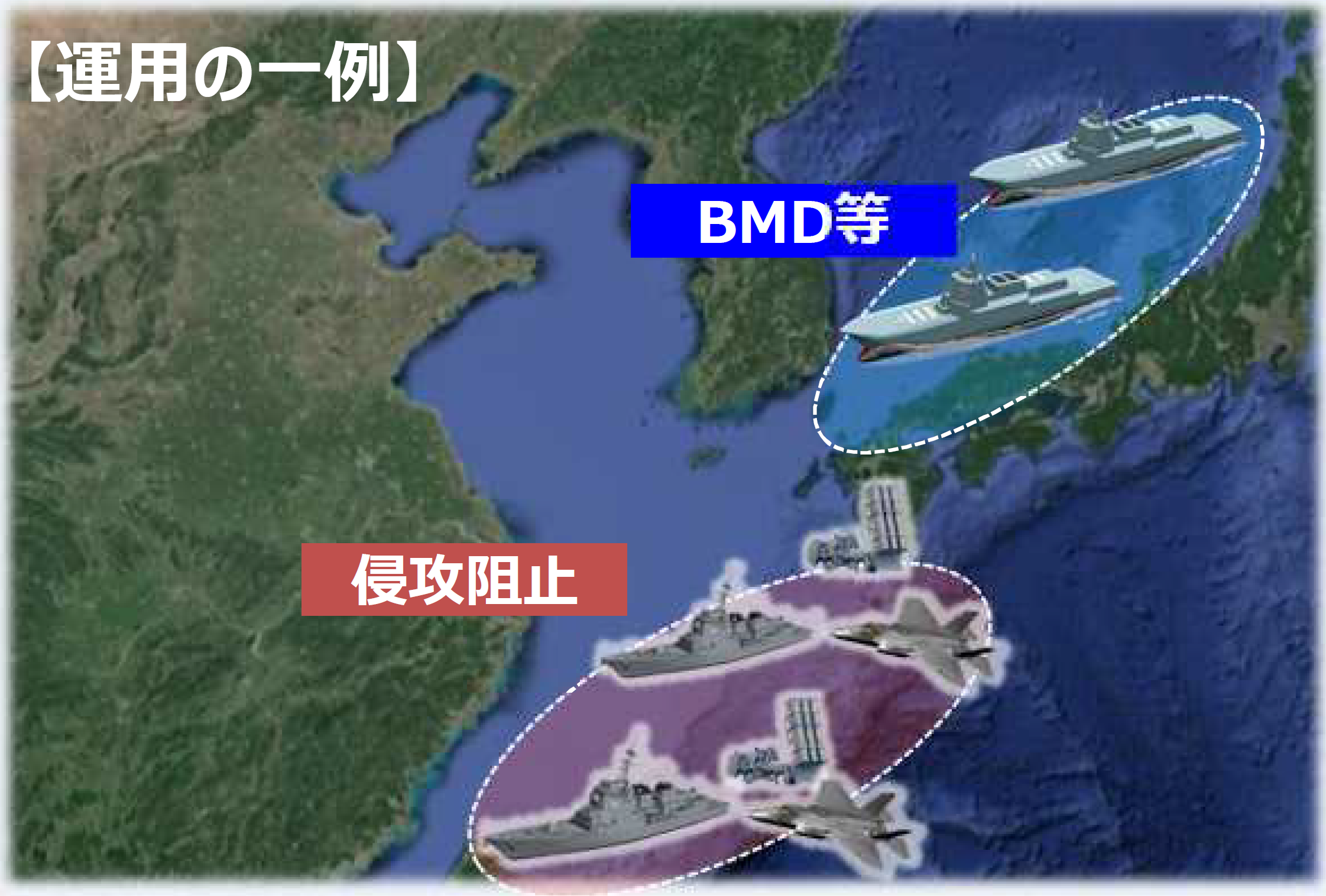
Examples of operations (JSDF image)

On 16 December 2022, the Japanese Cabinet approved a trio of defense-related policy documents, including its new National Security Strategy (NSS or 国家安全保障戦略), the strategic guideline document for the Japanese government's policies regarding diplomacy, defense, and economic security for the next decade. Based on the NSS, the National Defense Strategy (NDS or 国家防衛戦略) document outlined Japan's defense policy goals and the means to achieve them while the Defense Buildup Program (DBP or 防衛力整備計画) document outlined the scale of the introduction of specific defense equipment within the budgetary objectives. According to the Defense Buildup Program document, the JMSDF will increase the number of Aegis-equipped guided-missile destroyers (DDG) from the current 8 to 10 warships, as well as the introduction of two Aegis system-equipped vessels (ASEV) to be deployed in ballistic missile defense (BMD) operations. By the end of the decade, the JMSDF will operate 12 ships equipped with Aegis Weapon System (AWS) and likewise plans to replace its fleet of older, less capable destroyers and destroyer escorts with Mogami-class frigates.

On 23 December 2022, the Japanese Ministry of Defense's 2023 budget and program guidance documented provided examples of operations (運用の一例) for the Aegis-equipped naval forces of the Japanese Maritime Self Defense Force (MSDF). The two ASEV warship would be exclusively tasked for dedicated ballistic missile defense (BDM) missions (BMD等) and operate off the Korean peninsula in the Sea of Japan, allowing the other Aegis guided-missile destroyers to meet other contingencies (侵攻阻止) while operating independently to maintain the maritime domain awareness (MDA) and keep the sea lines of communication (SLOC) open in the East China Sea southwest of the Japanese home islands (pictured).

==== BMD exercises ====
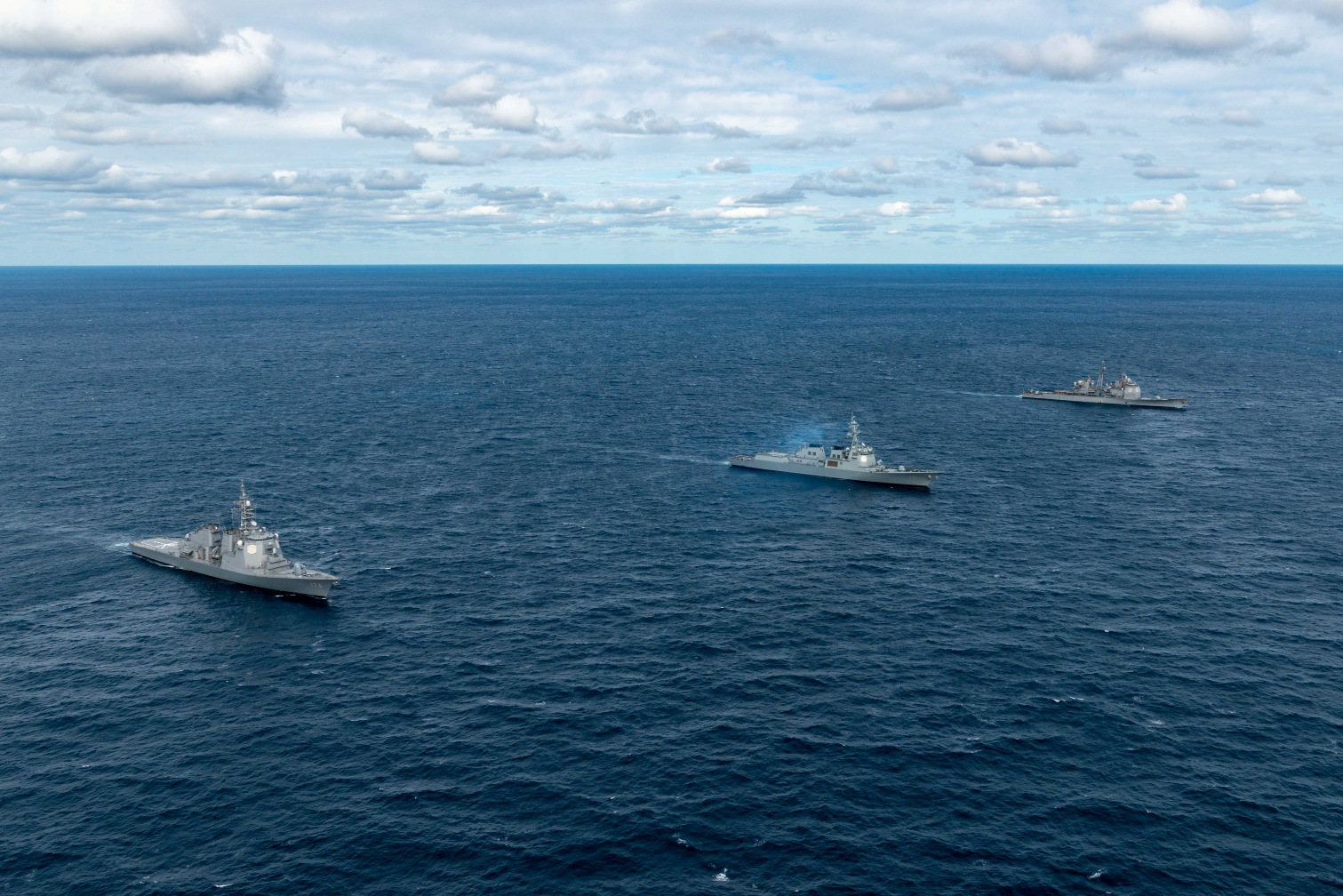
BMD maneuvers, October 2022)

On 6 October 2022, five warships from the United States, Japan, and South Korea held a multilateral ballistic missile defense exercise in the Sea of Japan (pictured) as part of the military response to ongoing North Korean intermediate-range ballistic missile tests over the Japanese home islands. On 16 November 2022, the guided-missile destroyer Maya fired an SM-3 Block IIA missile, successfully intercepting the target outside the atmosphere in the first launch of the missile from a Japanese warship. Two days later, the Haguro fired an SM-3 Block IB missile with a successful hit outside the atmosphere. Both test firings were conducted at the U.S. Pacific Missile Range Facility on Kauaʻi Island, Hawaii, in cooperation with the U.S. Navy and U.S. Missile Defense Agency. This was the first time the two ships conducted SM-3 firings in the same time period, and the tests validated the ballistic missile defense capabilities of Japan's newest Maya-class destroyers.

On 22 February 2023, five warships from the United States, Japan, and South Korea held a multilateral ballistic missile defense exercise in the Sea of Japan in response to the launch of a North Korean Hwasong-15 ballistic missile on 18 February 2023, landing in Japan's exclusive economic zone (EEZ) in the Sea of Japan, in an area 125 miles west of the island of Ōshima, which lies 30 miles (48 km) west of the main island of Hokkaido. Two additional IBCBMs were subsequently launched on 20 February 2023, with both landing in the Sea of Japan off the east coast of the Korean Peninsula. On 19 December 2023, United States, Japan, and South Korea announced the activation of a real-time North Korea missile warning system as well as jointly established a multi-year trilateral exercise plan in response to North Korea's continued ballistic missile launches.

== Equipment ==
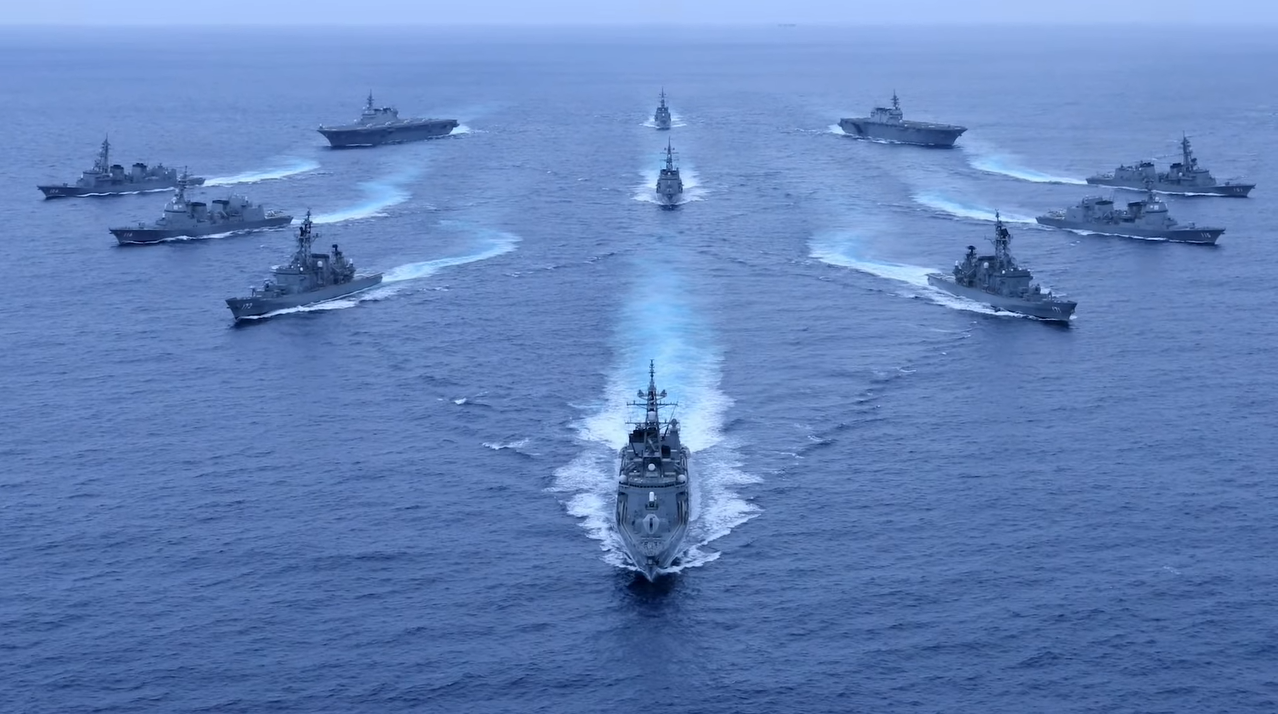
A Maritime Self-Defense Force formation.

=== Ships and submarines ===
The ship prefix JDS (Japanese Defense Ship) was used until 2008, at which time JMSDF ships started using the prefix JS (Japanese Ship) to reflect the upgrade of the Japanese Defense Agency to the Ministry of Defense. The JMSDF operates two multi-purpose operation destroyers (de facto aircraft carriers), two helicopter carriers (called helicopter destroyers), 36 destroyers, six frigates, six destroyer escorts, 23 attack submarines, 19 mine countermeasure vessels, six patrol vessels, three landing ship tanks, seven training vessels, and a fleet of various auxiliary ships. The fleet has a total displacement of approximately 624,000 tonnes, excluding auxiliary vessels.

=== Aircraft ===
The Japan Maritime Self-Defense Force aviation maintains a large naval air force, including 201 fixed-wing aircraft and 145 helicopters. Most of these aircraft are used in anti-submarine warfare operations.

== Organization, formations and structure ==
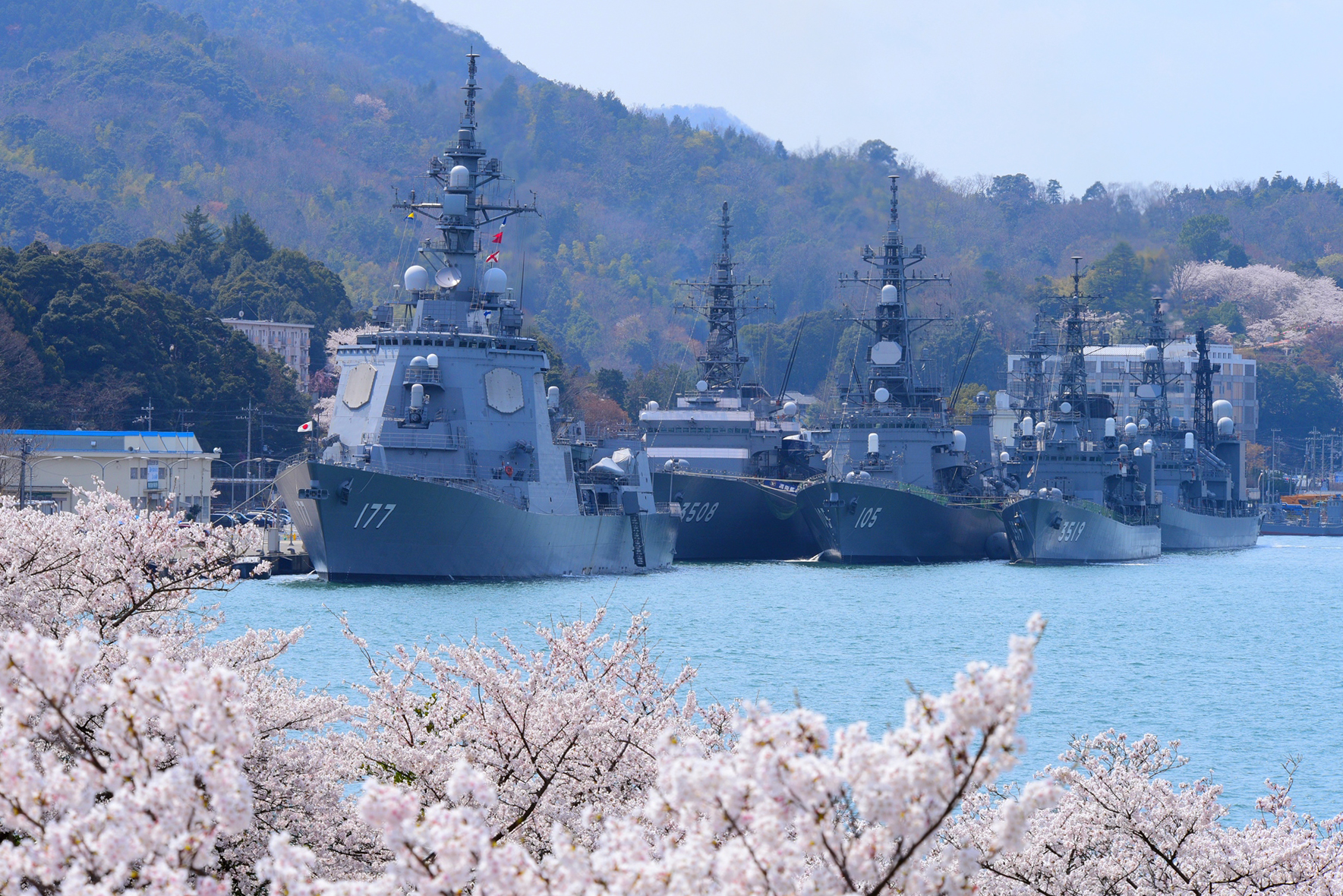
JMSDF destroyers and training ships docked at Maizuru Naval Base

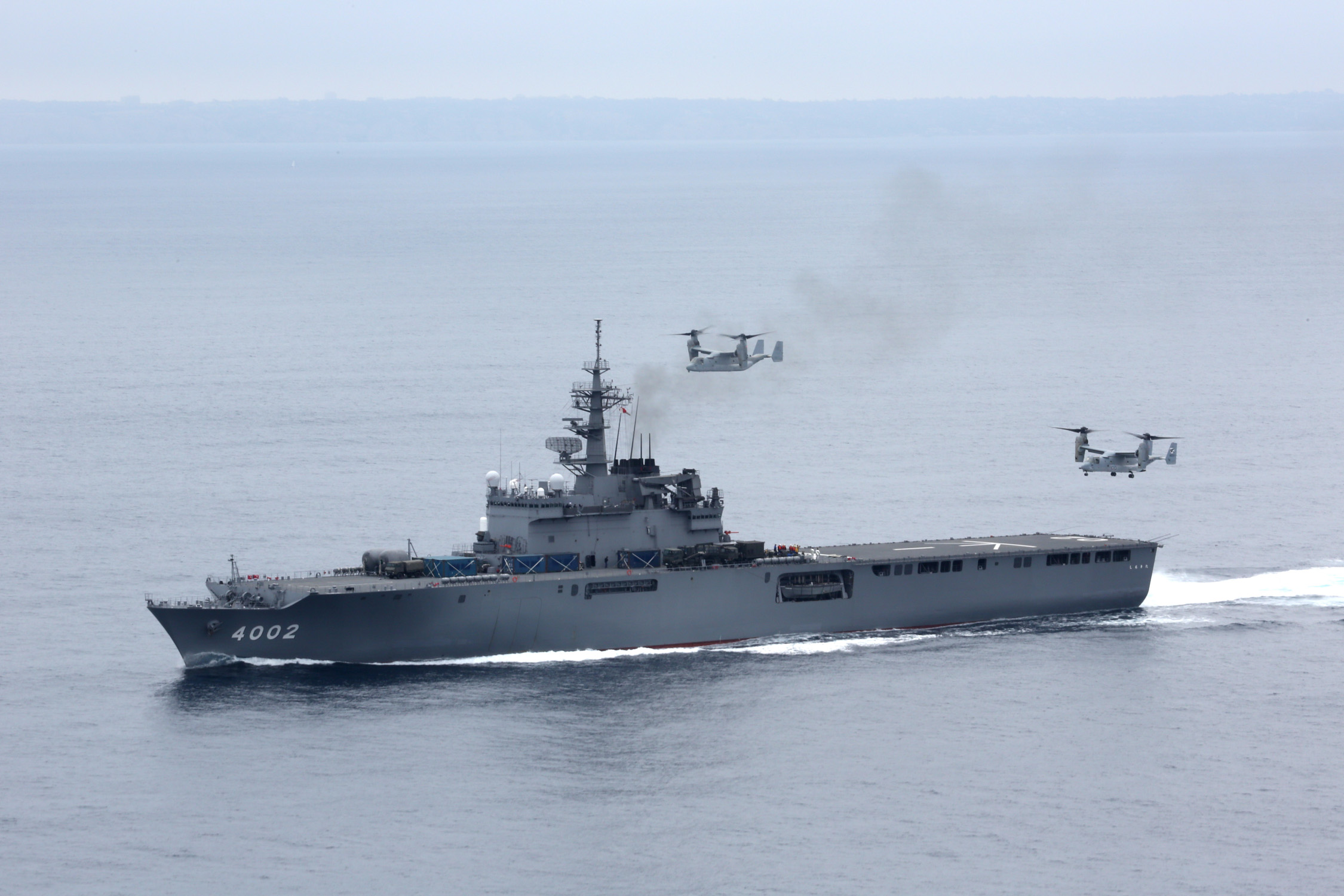
MV-22Bs landing on JS Shimokita

The JMSDF is commanded by the Chief of the Maritime Staff. Its structure consists of the Maritime Staff Office, the Self Defense Fleet, five regional district commands, the air-training squadron and various support units, such as hospitals and schools. The Maritime Staff Office, located in Tokyo, serves the Chief of Staff in commanding and supervising the force.

The Self-Defense Fleet, headquartered at Yokosuka, consists of the JMSDF's military shipping. It is composed of Fleet Surface Force, based in Yokosuka, Sasebo, Maizuru and Kure, the Fleet Air Force headquartered at Atsugi, the Fleet Submarine Force based at Yokosuka and Kure, the Mine Warfare Force based at Yokosuka and the Fleet Training Command at Yokosuka.

In March 2018, Ryoko Azuma became the first female squadron commander in the JMSDF. Her unit includes the flagship Izumo, the largest warship in the JMSDF. She commands four warships making up a division with a total of 1,000 crew members.

Each Escort Flotilla is formed as a fleet of eight destroyers and eight on-board helicopters. Each force is composed of one helicopter destroyer (DDH)/aircraft carrier (CVM) acting as a command ship, two guided-missile destroyers (DDG) and five standard or ASW destroyers (DD). The JMSDF is planning to reorganize the respective Escort Flotillas into a DDH/CVM group and DDG group, enabling faster overseas deployments.

- Prime Minister of Japan
  - Minister of Defense
    - JMSDF Chief of Staff / Maritime Staff Office
      - Self-Defense Fleet
        - Fleet Surface Force
          - Escort Flotilla 1 (Yokosuka)
            - Escort Division 1: CVM-183 Izumo; DDG-179 Maya; DD-101 Murasame; DD-107 Ikazuchi (Yokosuka)
            - Escort Division 5: DDG-173 Kongō; DD-108 Akebono; DD-109 Ariake; DD-115 Akizuki (Sasebo)
          - Escort Flotilla 2 (Sasebo)
            - Escort Division 2: DDH-182 Ise; DDG-178 Ashigara; DD-102 Harusame; DD-119 Asahi (Sasebo)
            - Escort Division 6: DDG-174 Kirishima; DD-110 Takanami; DD-111 Ōnami; DD-116 Teruzuki (Yokosuka)
          - Escort Flotilla 3 (Maizuru)
            - Escort Division 3: DDH-181 Hyūga; DDG-175 Myōkō; DDG-177 Atago; DD-118 Fuyuzuki (Maizuru)
            - Escort Division 7: DD-103 Yūdachi; DD-112 Makinami; DD-114 Suzunami; DD-120 Shiranui (Ominato)
          - Escort Flotilla 4 (Kure)
            - Escort Division 4: CVM-184 Kaga; DD-105 Inazuma; DD-106 Samidare; DD-113 Sazanami (Kure)
            - Escort Division 8: DDG-180 Haguro; DDG-176 Chōkai; DD-104 Kirisame; DD-117 Suzutsuki (Sasebo)
          - Naval District Forces:
            - Escort Division 11: DD-152 Yamagiri; DD-153 Yūgiri; DD-154 Amagiri; FFM-1 Mogami; FFM-2 Kumano (Yokosuka)
            - Escort Division 12: DD-158 Umigiri; DE-229 Abukuma; DE-234 Tone (Kure)
            - Escort Division 13: DD-157 Sawagiri; DE-230 Jintsū; FFM-3 Noshiro; FFM-4 Mikuma (Sasebo)
            - Escort Division 14: DD-151 Asagiri; DE-232 Sendai; DD-156 Setogiri; FFM-5 Yahagi; FFM-6 Agano (Maizuru)
            - Escort Division 15: DD-155 Hamagiri; DE-231 Ōyodo; DE-233 Chikuma (Ominato)
          - 1st Replenishment-at-Sea Squadron (Yokosuka): AOE-422 Towada (Kure); AOE-423 Tokiwa (Yokosuka); AOE-424 Hamana (Sasebo); AOE-425 Mashu (Maizuru); AOE-426 Ōmi (Sasebo)
          - 1st Training Support Squadron: ATS-4202 Kurobe; ATS-4203 Tenryu (Kure)
          - Fleet Training Command (Yokosuka)
        - Fleet Air Force
          - Fleet Air Wing 1 (P-3C UH-60J)
          - Fleet Air Wing 2 (P-3C UH-60J)
          - Fleet Air Wing 4 (P-3C UH-60J)
          - Fleet Air Wing 5 (P-3C UH-60J)
          - Fleet Air Wing 21 (SH-60J/K)
          - Fleet Air Wing 22 (SH-60J)
          - Fleet Air Wing 31 (US-1A US-2 EP-3 OP-3C UP-3D LC-90 U-36A)
          - Fleet Squadron 51 (P-1, P-3C UP-3C/D OP-3 SH-60J/K OH-6DA)
          - Fleet Squadron 61 (C-130R LC-90)
          - Mine Countermeasures Helicopter Squadron 111 (MCH-101)
        - Fleet Submarine Force (Yokosuka)
          - Submarine Flotilla 1 (Kure)
            - Flotilla HQ: ASR-403 Chihaya
            - Submarine Squadron 1: SS-594 Isoshio; SS-507 Jinryū; SS-510 Shōryū; SS-514 Hakugei; SS-516 Raigei
            - Submarine Squadron 3: SS-504 Kenryū; SS-511 Ōryū; SS-596 Kuroshio; SS-600 Mochishio
            - Submarine Squadron 5: SS-501 Sōryū; SS-502 Unryū; SS-503 Hakuryū; SS-508 Sekiryū
            - Kure Submarine Base Support Squadron
          - Submarine Flotilla 2 (Yokosuka)
            - Flotilla HQ: ASR-404 Chiyoda
            - Submarine Squadron 2: SS-592 Uzushio; SS-595 Narushio; SS-597 Takashio
            - Submarine Squadron 4: SS-598 Yaeshio; SS-599 Setoshio; SS-512 Tōryū; SS-515 Jingei
            - Submarine Squadron 6: SS-505 Zuiryū; SS-506 Kokuryū; SS-509 Seiryū
            - Yokosuka Submarine Base Support Squadron
          - 1st Submarine Training Squadron (Kure): TSS-3609 Michishio; TSS-3610 Makishio; SSE-6201 Taigei
          - Submarine Training Command (Kure)
            - Yokosuka Submarine Training Detachment
        - Mine Warfare Force (Yokosuka)
          - Minesweeper Squadron 1 (Yokosuka): MST-463 Uraga; MSO-304 Awaji; MSO-305 Hirado; MSC-606 Hatsushima
          - Minesweeper Squadron 2 (Sasebo): MSC-601 Hirashima; MSC-602 Yakushima; MSC-603 Takashima (all Hirashima-class minesweepers)
          - Minesweeper Squadron 3 (Kure): MST-464 Bungo; MSC-688 Aishima; MSC-690 Miyajima
          - Minesweeper Squadron 101 (Kure): MSC-679 Yugeshima; MSC-680 Nagashima (both Uwajima-class minesweepers); 4 minesweeping unmanned surface vehicles (SAM 1 - 4)
          - Landing Ship Squadron 1 (Kure): LST-4001 Ōsumi; LST-4002 Shimokita; LST-4003 Kunisaki
            - 1st Landing Craft Air Cushion Unit (Kure): LCAC-2101 - 2106
          - Mine Warfare Support Center (Yokosuka)
            - Mine Warfare Support Detachment Kure
        - Fleet Research & Development Command
        - Fleet Intelligence Command
        - Oceanographic and ASW Support Command
      - Air Training Command
        - Shimofusa Air Training Group (P-3C YS-11TA UH-60J)
        - Tokushima Air Training Group (202nd Naval Air Training Squadron) (TC-90) (UC-90) (UH-60J)
        - Ozuki Air Training Group (T-5 UH-60J)
      - Maritime Material Command
        - Ship Supply Depot
        - Air Supply Depot
      - Training Division (Kure)
        - Division HQ: TV-3508 Kashima
        - Training Squadron 1: TV-3520 Hatakaze; TV-3521 Shimakaze
      - Communication Command
      - Criminal Investigation Command
      - Service Activity Tokyo
      - Printing Supply Unit
      - JMSDF Staff College
      - Maritime Officer Candidate School
      - 1st Service School
      - 2nd Service School
      - 3rd Service School
      - 4th Service School
      - Sub Area Activity Hanshin
      - Yokosuka District
      - Kure District
      - Sasebo District
      - Maizuru District
      - Ominato District

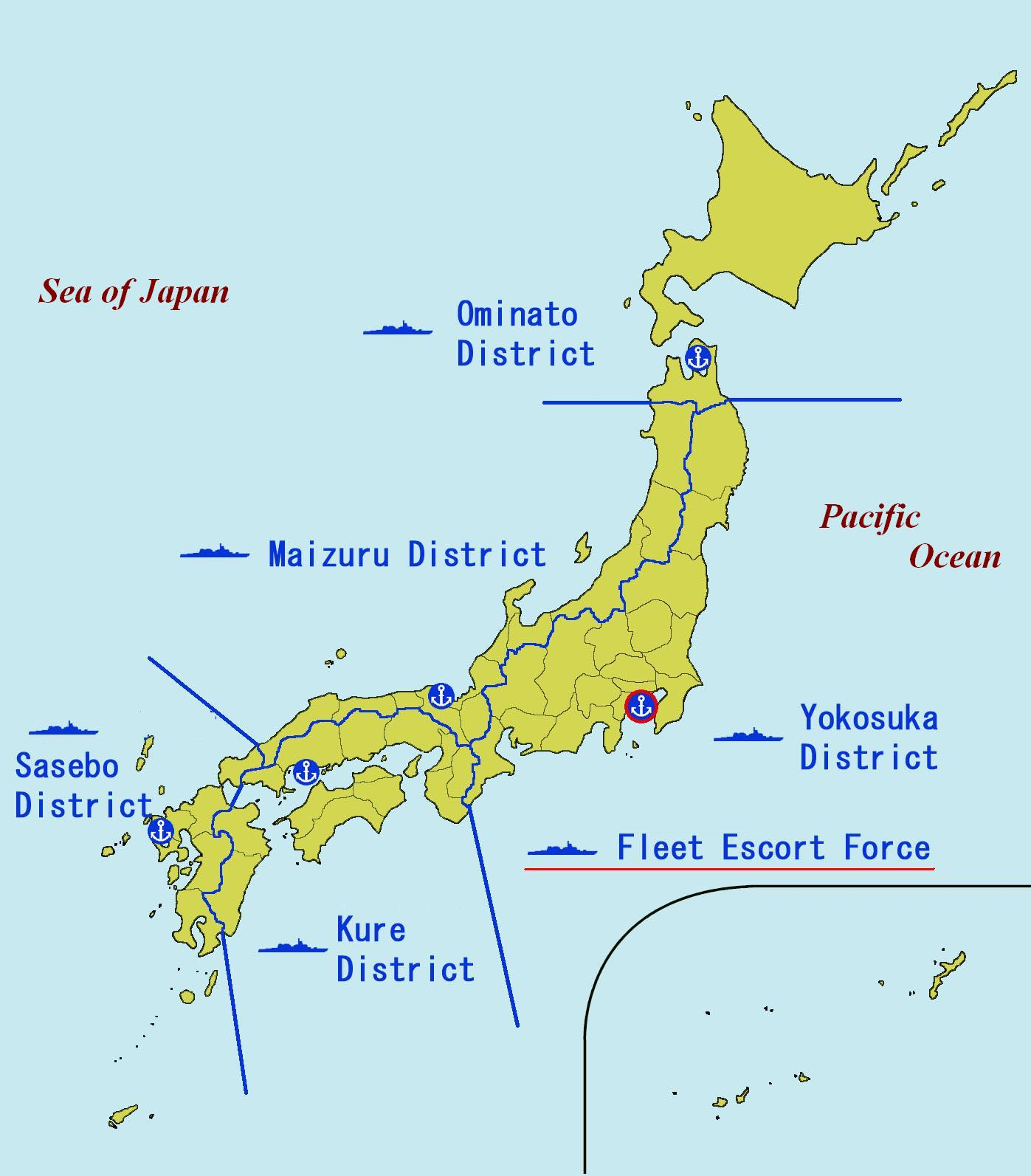
JMSDF District Forces

=== District Forces ===
Five district units act in concert with the fleet to guard the waters of their jurisdictions and provide shore-based support. Each district is home to a major JMSDF base and its supporting personnel and staff. Each district is home to one or two regional escort squadrons, composed of two to three destroyers or destroyer escorts (DE). The destroyers tend to be of older classes, mainly former escort force ships. The destroyer escorts tend to be purpose built vessels. Each district has a number of minesweeping ships.

=== Fleet Air Force ===
The Fleet Air Force is tasked with patrol, ASW and rescue tasks. It is composed primarily of seven aviation groups. Prominent bases are maintained at Kanoya, Hachinohe, Atsugi, Naha, Tateyama, Omura and Iwakuni. The Fleet Air Force is built up mainly with patrol aircraft such as the Lockheed P-3 Orion, rescue aircraft such as the Shin Meiwa US-1A and helicopters such as the Mitsubishi SH-60J. In the JMSDF, helicopters deployed to each escort force are actually members of Fleet Air Force squadrons based on land.

=== Special Forces and Security Units ===
Special forces and tactical boarding units consist of the following:

Special Boarding Unit (SBU): The JMSDF's designated special forces unit, trained for high-risk, non-compliant maritime interdictions, hostage rescue, and counter-terrorism.

Maritime Interception Teams (MIT) (Tachiri Kensatai): Standard, shipboard VBSS (Visit, Board, Search, and Seizure) teams organically assigned to individual destroyers and frigates. Composed of regular ship crew members with specialized security training, they are used for routine, compliant boarding operations and maritime law enforcement.

=== Ranks ===
==== Commissioned officer ranks ====
The rank insignia of commissioned officers.

Rank group	General / flag officers			Senior officers			Junior officers
Japan Maritime Self-Defense Force
Japan Maritime Self-Defense Force	幕僚長および統合作戦司令官たる海将; Bakuryōchō-oyobi-Tōgōsakusenshireikan-taru-kaishō	海将; Kaishō	海将補; Kaishō-ho	1等海佐; Ittō kaisa	2等海佐; Nitō kaisa	3等海佐; Santō kaisa	1等海尉; Ittō kaii	2等海尉; Nitō kaii	3等海尉; Santō kaii	准海尉; Jun kaii

==== Other ranks ====
The rank insignia of non-commissioned officers and enlisted personnel.

Rank group	Senior NCOs				Junior NCOs		Enlisted
Japan Maritime Self-Defense Force
Japan Maritime Self-Defense Force	海曹長; Kaisōchō	1等海曹; Ittō kaisō	2等海曹; Nitō kaisō	3等海曹; Santō kaisō	海士長; Kaishichō	1等海士; Ittō kaishi	2等海士; Nitō kaishi	自衛官候補生; Jieikan kōhosei

== Culture and traditions ==
=== Flag and insignia ===
The Imperial Japanese Navy first adopted the off-set naval ensign Jūrokujō-Kyokujitsu-ki (十六条旭日旗) on May 15, 1870, and it was used until the end of World War II in 1945. On June 30, 1954, when the JSDF was established, the JSDF and JGSDF adopted a different rising sun flag with 8-rays and an 8:9 ratio. The old off-set navy flag with the sun and 16 rays was re-adopted as the ensign of the Maritime Self-Defense Force, but it was modified with a brighter red color. The original flag is darker red (RGB #b12d3d) while the post-WW2 version is brighter red (RGB #bd0029).

The "Z" maritime signal flag was used by Admiral Tōgō as a victory flag at the Battle of Tsushima, and has been used on occasion by the JMSDF as an unofficial ensign to avoid controversy with the Rising Sun flag.

=== Music and traditions ===
The JMSDF has maintained some historic links with the Imperial Japanese Navy. Today's JMSDF continues to use the same martial songs, naval flags, signs, and technical terms as the IJN. The JMSDF still uses the Warship March, the old service march of the IJN, as its official service march. It also maintains the IJN bugle calls tradition, as every ship and shore establishment command maintain a platoon or squad of bugle players.

The JMSDF band has also added popular anime soundtracks to their repertoire, with the soundtrack from Space Battleship Yamato becoming a signature song for the band.

=== Collaboration ===
The JMSDF started an official collaboration with the warship game franchise Kantai Collection, notably using girls from the franchise as mascots for their ship using the same name. For example, JS Kaga has the ship girl wearing the JMSDF women uniform as her official mascot, and the game introduced the "Kaga Kai Ni Go" ship remodel, notably featuring amament from the early JMSDF, and a flight deck copied from JS Kaga. The girl Shigure is even the official mascot for the Sasebo Naval District.

=== Food ===
Curry was introduced to Japan by the British Royal Navy. It soon gained popularity among the civilian population and it's not clear whether it became popular as returning Japanese military veterans introduced it, or that the Japanese military adopted it as a staple due to its popularity, however the Japanese Navy discovered its high thiamine content help combat beriberi, then a constant threat due to the difficulty in providing fresh vegetables on long sea voyages, and dictated it should be served weekly. It quickly became known as a quintessential Navy dish, as Navy cooks adapted the dish to the Japanese palate and further cemented its place in Japanese cuisine.

Up until her decommission, the JS Hachijō (MSO-303) continued the tradition of serving curry every Friday. Each ship's galley would unofficially competing to make the best curry in the fleet, with recipes closely guarded as a matter of pride.

=== Ship names ===
The ship prefix JDS (Japanese Defense Ship) was used until 2008, at which time JMSDF ships started using the prefix JS (Japanese Ship) to reflect the upgrade of the Japanese Defense Agency to the Ministry of Defense.

Ships of the JMSDF, known as Japan Ships (自衛艦; Ji'ei-Kan), are classified according to the following criteria:

The naming convention of Japanese ships
Class		Type	Symbol	Building #	#	Naming
Major class	Minor class	Type	Symbol	Building #	#	Naming
Combatant Ship	Principle Surface Combatants	Frigate	FFM		1-	Names of the rivers
Combatant Ship	Principle Surface Combatants	Destroyer	DD	1601-	101-	Names of natural phenomena in the heavens or the atmosphere, mountains, rivers or regions
Combatant Ship	Principle Surface Combatants	Destroyer escort	DE	1201-	201-	Names of natural phenomena in the heavens or the atmosphere, mountains, rivers or regions
Combatant Ship	Principle Surface Combatants	Destroyer, Guided Missile	DDG		173-	Names of places in Japan, such as mountains and provinces
Combatant Ship	Principle Surface Combatants	Destroyer, Helicopter	DDH		141- 181-	Names of places in Japan, such as mountains and provinces
Combatant Ship	Principle Surface Combatants	Aircraft Carrier, Multi-role	CVM		183-	Names of places in Japan, such as mountains and provinces
Combatant Ship	Principle Surface Combatants	Cruiser, Guided Missile	CG	1901-	191-	Names of places in Japan, such as mountains and provinces
Combatant Ship	Submarine	Submarine	SS	8001-	501-	Names of natural phenomena in the ocean or maritime animals
Combatant Ship	Mine Warfare Ship	Minesweeper Ocean	MSO	201-	301-	Names of islands, straits, channels or one that added a number to the type
Combatant Ship	Mine Warfare Ship	Minesweeper Coast	MSC	301-	601-	Names of islands, straits, channels or one that added a number to the type
Combatant Ship	Mine Warfare Ship	Minesweeping Controller	MCL	-	721-	Names of islands, straits, channels or one that added a number to the type
Combatant Ship	Mine Warfare Ship	Minesweeper Tender	MST	462-	461-	Names of islands, straits, channels or one that added a number to the type
Combatant Ship	Patrol Combatant Craft	Patrol Guided Missile Boat	PG	821-	821-	Names of birds, grass or one that added a number to the type
Combatant Ship	Patrol Combatant Craft	Patrol Boat	PB	921-	901-	Names of birds, grass or one that added a number to the type
Combatant Ship	Amphibious Ship	Landing Ship, Tank	LST	4101-	4001-	Names of peninsulas, capes or one that added a number to the type
Combatant Ship	Amphibious Ship	Landing Ship Utility	LSU	4171-	4171-	Names of peninsulas, capes or one that added a number to the type
Combatant Ship	Amphibious Ship	Landing Craft Utility	LCU	2001–	2001–	Names of peninsulas, capes or one that added a number to the type
Landing Craft Air Cushioned	Amphibious Ship	LCAC	-	2001–		Names of peninsulas, capes or one that added a number to the type
Auxiliary Ship	Auxiliary Ship	Training Ship	TV	3501-	3501-	Names of places of natural beauty and historic interest or one that added a number to the type or the model
Auxiliary Ship	Auxiliary Ship	Training Submarine	TSS	-	-	Names of places of natural beauty and historic interest or one that added a number to the type or the model
Auxiliary Ship	Auxiliary Ship	Training Support Ship	ATS	4201-	4201-	Names of places of natural beauty and historic interest or one that added a number to the type or the model
Auxiliary Ship	Auxiliary Ship	Multipurpose Support Ship	AMS	-	-	Names of places of natural beauty and historic interest or one that added a number to the type or the model
Auxiliary Ship	Auxiliary Ship	Oceanographic Research Ship	AGS	5101-	5101-	Names of places of natural beauty and historic interest or one that added a number to the type or the model
Auxiliary Ship	Auxiliary Ship	Ocean Surveillance Ship	AOS	5201-	5201-	Names of places of natural beauty and historic interest or one that added a number to the type or the model
Auxiliary Ship	Auxiliary Ship	Ice breaker	AGB	5001-	5001-	Names of places of natural beauty and historic interest or one that added a number to the type or the model
Auxiliary Ship	Auxiliary Ship	Cable Repairing Ship	ARC	1001-	481-	Names of places of natural beauty and historic interest or one that added a number to the type or the model
Auxiliary Ship	Auxiliary Ship	Submarine Rescue Ship	ASR	1101-	401-	Names of places of natural beauty and historic interest or one that added a number to the type or the model
Auxiliary Ship	Auxiliary Ship	Submarine Rescue Tender	AS	1111-	405-	Names of places of natural beauty and historic interest or one that added a number to the type or the model
Auxiliary Ship	Auxiliary Ship	Experimental Ship	ASE	6101-	6101-	Names of places of natural beauty and historic interest or one that added a number to the type or the model
Auxiliary Ship	Auxiliary Ship	Fast Combat Support Ship	AOE	4011-	421-	Names of places of natural beauty and historic interest or one that added a number to the type or the model
Auxiliary Ship	Auxiliary Ship	Service Utility Ship	ASU	-	7001-	Names of places of natural beauty and historic interest or one that added a number to the type or the model
Auxiliary Ship	Auxiliary Ship	Service Utility Craft	ASU	81-	61-	Names of places of natural beauty and historic interest or one that added a number to the type or the model
Auxiliary Ship	Auxiliary Ship	Service Yacht	ASY	91-	91-	Names of places of natural beauty and historic interest or one that added a number to the type or the model

== Recruitment and training ==
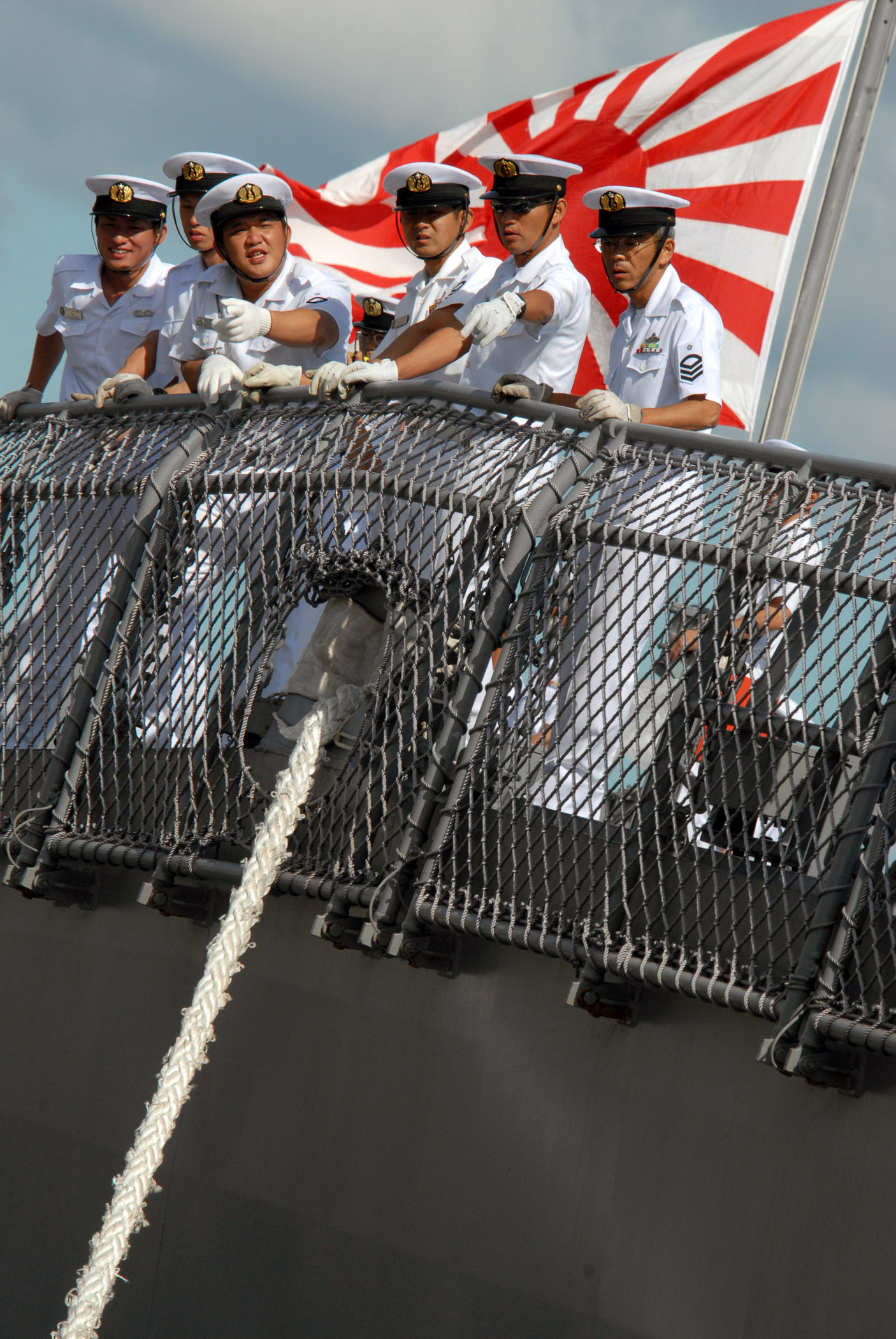
Members of the crew of JS Kongō

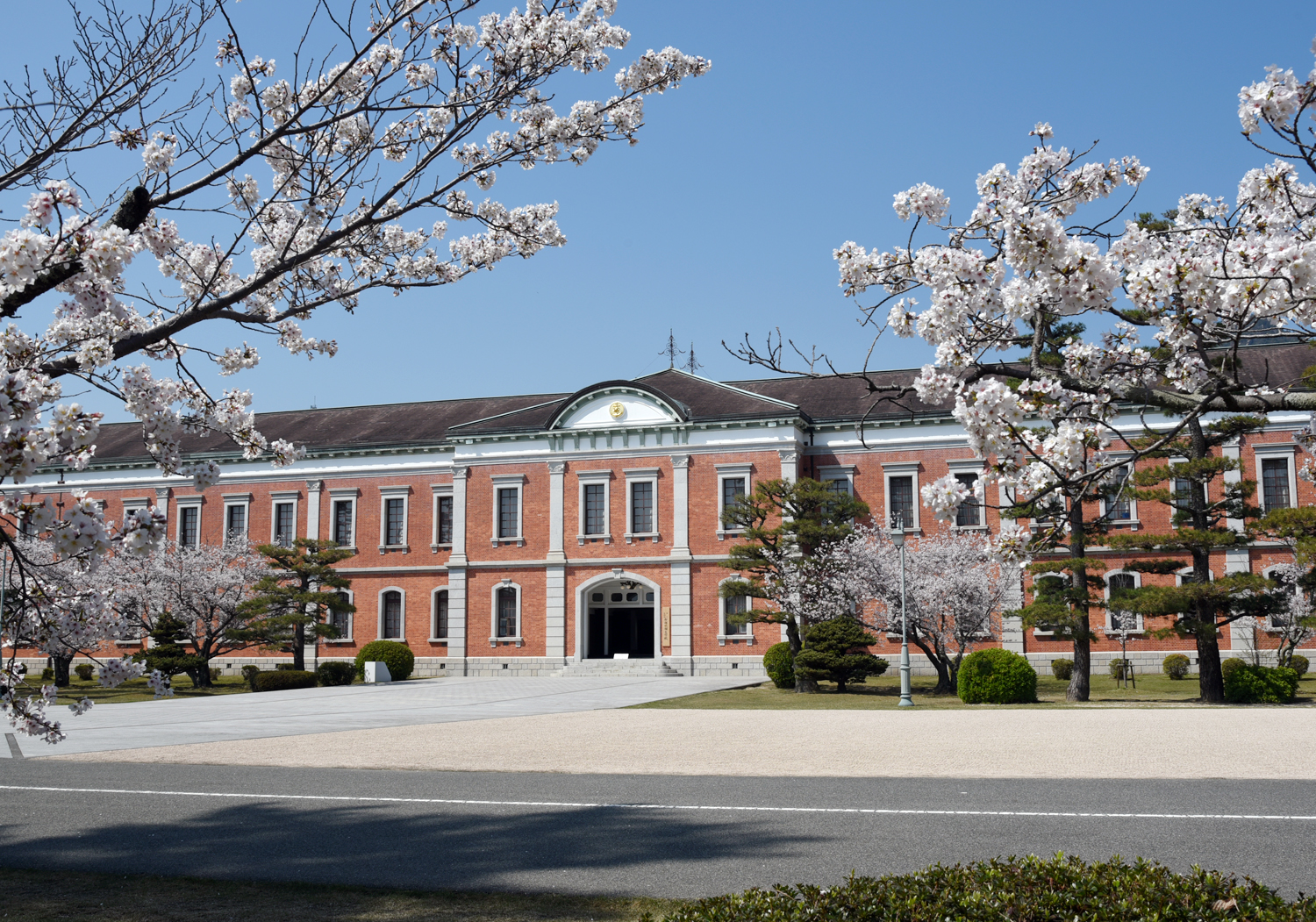
The Officer Candidate School

JMSDF recruits receive three months of basic training followed by courses in patrol, gunnery, minesweeping, convoy operations, and maritime transportation. Flight students, all upper-secondary school graduates, enter a two-year course. Officer candidate schools offer six-month courses to qualified enlisted personnel and those who have completed flight school.

Graduates of four-year universities, the four-year National Defense Academy, and particularly outstanding enlisted personnel undergo a one-year officer course at the Officer Candidate School at Etajima, site of the former Imperial Naval Academy. The JMSDF operates a staff college in Tokyo for senior officers.

The large volume of coastal commercial fishing and maritime traffic around Japan limits in-service sea training, especially in the relatively shallow waters required for mine laying, minesweeping, and submarine rescue practice. Training days are scheduled around slack fishing seasons in winter and summer—providing about ten days during the year.

The JMSDF maintains two oceangoing training ships and conducted annual long-distance on-the-job training for graduates of the one-year officer candidate school.

== See also ==
- Imperial Japanese Navy - dissolved following WW2
- Japanese ship naming conventions
- Maritime Safety Agency - predecessor to JMSDF - would become the Japan Coast Guard
- Naval Academy Etajima - JMSDF officer candidate and enlisted technical school
- Naval Computer and Telecommunications Station Yokosuka, Japan – US Navy facility key to MSDF/USN operational coordination.
- Shipping Control Authority for the Japanese Merchant Marine – Post-WWII Occupation era organisation
- Ships transferred from the United States Navy to the Japan Maritime Self-Defense Force [Category]
