= Uwajima-class minesweeper =

Coastal minesweepers of JMSDF

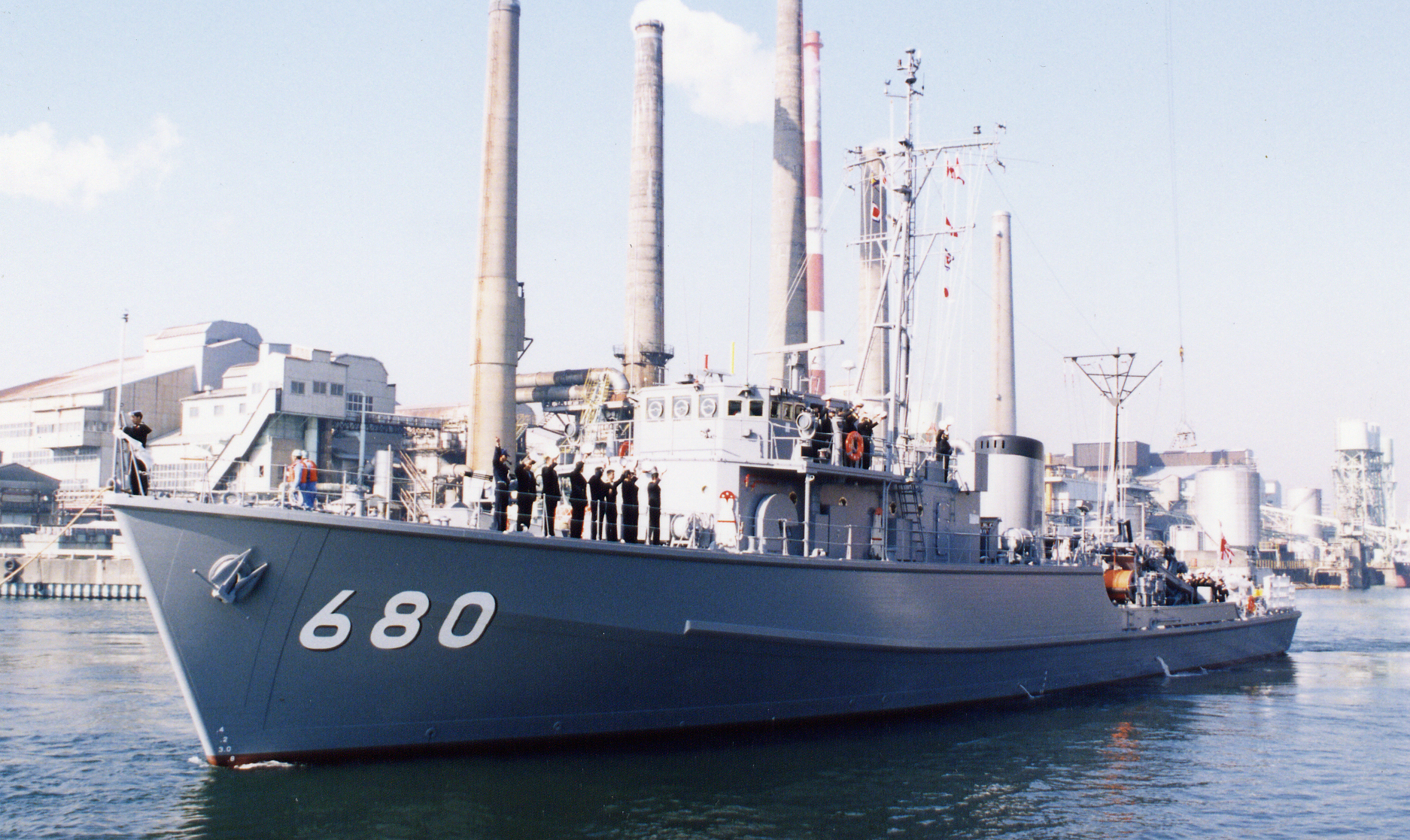
- JS Nagashima

Class overview
- Name: Uwajima
- Builders: NKK, Keihin; Hitachi, Kanagawa
- Preceded by: Hatsushima class
- Succeeded by: Sugashima class
- Built: 1989-1996
- In commission: 1990-2020
- Planned: 9
- Completed: 9
- Retired: 9

General characteristics
- Type: Minesweeper
- Displacement: 490 t (480 long tons) standard; 570 t (560 long tons) full load
- Length: 58 m (190 ft 3 in)
- Beam: 9.4 m (30 ft 10 in)
- Draft: 2.9 m (9 ft 6 in)
- Depth: 4.2 m (13 ft 9 in)
- Propulsion: 2 × Mitsubishi 6NM-TA diesel electric engines; 2 × shafts
- Speed: 14 kn (26 km/h; 16 mph)
- Complement: 45
- Sensors & processing systems: OPS-39-Y surface-search radar; ZQS-3-1 sonar
- Armament: 1 × single JM61R-MS 20mm guns

The Uwajima class is a class of coastal minesweepers of the Japan Maritime Self-Defense Force.

== Development ==
From the lessons learned from the 1991 dispatch of the Self-Defense Forces to the Persian Gulf, the Maritime Self-Defense Force took the example of the Royal Navy's Sandown class minehunter, built after the 1994 plan, especially in order to improve its capabilities regarding mine clearance. However, while the Sandown class is basically a minesweeper that does not have minesweeping ability. The waters around Japan have many muddy seabeds that are not suitable for minesweeping, and abandonment of minesweeping ability is unacceptable. For this reason, the class is also given the ability to sweep with Australian-made DYAD-sensitive minesweepers, but due to magnetic management issues, it was decided that it would not be installed all the time, but would be received from the mother ship at sea as needed. Operational restrictions were large, and mobility was also restricted.

For this reason, it was built as a new type of minesweeper equipped with a domestic system that has the same performance as the overseas-made minesweeping system equipped in the Sugashima class, as well as realizing the installation of minesweepers on its own boat.

== Ships in the class ==
| Pennant no. | Name | Builders | Laid down | Launched | Commissioned | Decommissioned | Home port |
|---|---|---|---|---|---|---|---|
| MSC-672 | Uwajima | Nippon Kokan, Keihin | 18 May 1989 | 23 May 1990 | 19 December 1990 | 24 June 2010 | Yokosuka |
| MSC-673 | Ieshima | Hitachi Zosen Corporation, Kanagawa | 12 May 1989 | 12 June 1990 | 19 December 1990 | 16 May 2014 | Yokosuka |
| MSC-674 | Tsukishima | Hitachi Zosen Corporation, Kanagawa | 27 May 1991 | 23 July 1992 | 23 July 1993 | 21 March 2012 | Yokosuka |
| MSC-675 | Maejima | Hitachi Zosen Corporation, Kanagawa | 1 June 1992 | 10 June 1993 | 15 December 1993 | 27 March 2017 | Yokosuka |
| MSC-676 | Kumejima | Nippon Kokan, Keihin | 17 February 1993 | 9 December 1993 | 12 December 1994 | 27 March 2018 | Kure |
| MSC-677 | Makishima | Hitachi Zosen Corporation, Kanagawa | 12 May 1993 | 26 May 1993 | 12 December 1994 | 2 April 2014 | Kure |
| MSC-678 | Tobishima | Nippon Kokan, Keihin | 22 June 1993 | 30 August 1994 | 10 March 1995 | 12 May 2014 | Kure |
| MSC-679 | Yugeshima | Hitachi Zosen Corporation, Kanagawa | 10 April 1995 | 24 May 1995 | 11 December 1996 | 1 October 2020 | Kure |
| MSC-680 | Nagashima | Nippon Kokan, Keihin | 14 April 1995 | 30 May 1996 | 25 December 1996 | 1 October 2020 | Kure |
