= Harishima-class minesweeper =

Coastal minesweepers of JMSDF

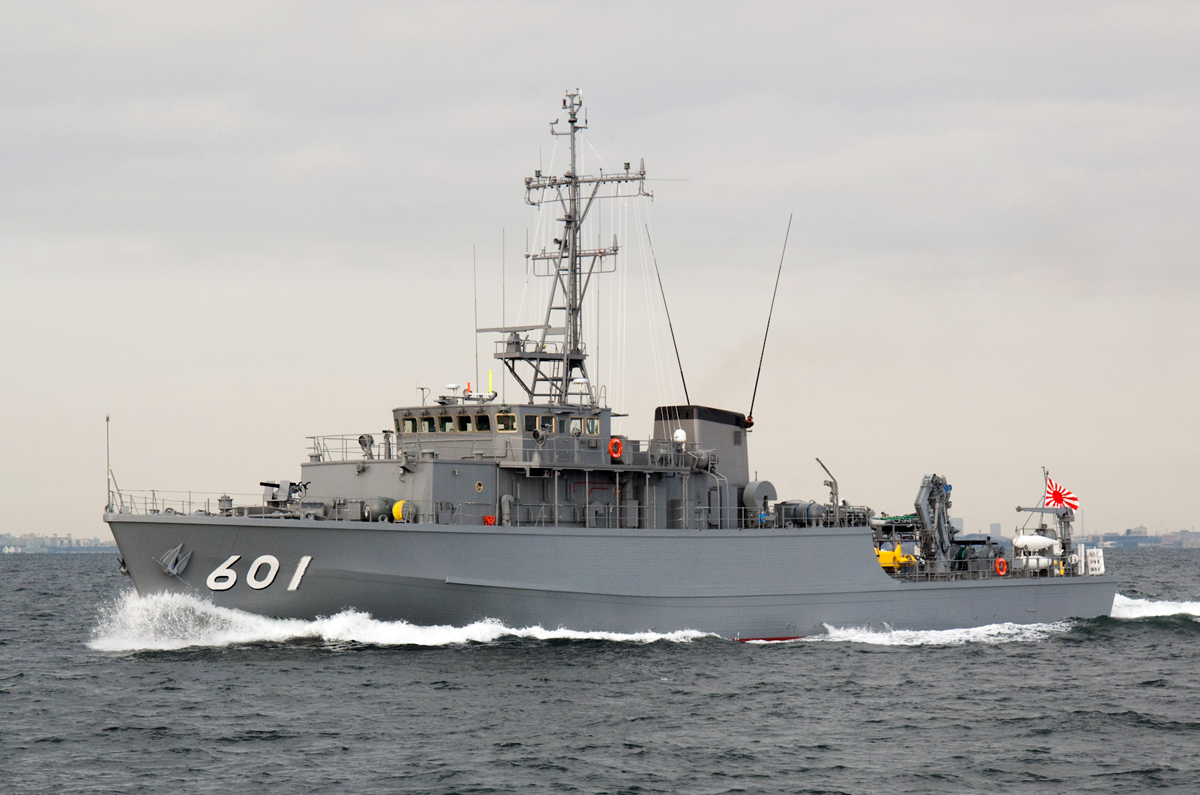
- JS Hirashima

Class overview
- Name: Hirashima
- Builders: USC, Keihin
- Preceded by: Sugashima class
- Succeeded by: Enoshima class
- Built: 2005-2008
- In commission: 2008-present
- Planned: 3
- Completed: 3
- Active: 3

General characteristics
- Type: Minesweeper
- Displacement: 570 t (560 long tons) standard; 650 t (640 long tons) full load
- Length: 57 m (187 ft 0 in)
- Beam: 9.8 m (32 ft 2 in)
- Depth: 4.4 m (14 ft 5 in)
- Propulsion: 2 × Mitsubishi 6NMU diesel electric engines; 2 × shafts
- Speed: 14 kn (26 km/h; 16 mph)
- Complement: 48
- Sensors & processing systems: OPS-39 surface-search radar; OYQ-201 sonar; ZQS-4 sonar
- Armament: 1 × single JM61R-MS 20mm guns

The Hirashima class is a class of coastal minesweepers of the Japan Maritime Self-Defense Force (JMSDF).

== Development ==
From the lessons learned in the 1991 dispatch of the Japanese Self-Defense Forces to the Persian Gulf, the Maritime Self-Defense Force took the example of the Royal Navy's Sandown-class minehunter, built after the 1994 plan especially in order to improve its capabilities regarding mine clearance. However, due to the fact that the Sandown-class is basically a minesweeper that does not have minesweeping ability and the fact that the waters around Japan have many muddy seabeds that are not suitable for minesweeping, the abandonment of minesweeping ability was unacceptable to the JMSDF. For these reasons, ships were given the ability to sweep with Australian-made DYAD-sensitive minesweepers, but, due to magnetic management issues, it was decided that it would not be installed all the time but would be received from a mother ship at sea as needed. Operational restrictions were large, and mobility was also restricted.

For these reasons, the Hirashima-class was built as a new type of minesweeper equipped with a domestic system that had the same performance as the overseas-made minesweeping system equipped in the Sugashima-class.

== Ships in the class ==
Pennant no.	Name	Builders	Laid down	Launched	Commissioned	Home port
MSC-601	Hirashima	Universal Shipbuilding Corporation, Keihin	17 May 2005	27 September 2006	11 March 2008	Sasebo
MSC-602	Yakushima	Universal Shipbuilding Corporation, Keihin	17 May 2006	26 September 2007	6 March 2009	Sasebo
MSC-603	Takashima	Universal Shipbuilding Corporation, Keihin	10 May 2007	29 September 2008	26 February 2010	Sasebo
