= Naval Computer and Telecommunications Station, Far East =

Coordinates: 35.293°N 139.670°E

- Active: 1951–present
- Country: United States of America
- Branch: United States Navy
- Type: Operational Shore
- Role: Communications and Information Systems
- Nickname: NCTS Far East
- Mottos: Ready, Reliable, Resilient
- Equipment: Computer Networks, Communications Equipment, Cryptographic Devices

Commanders
- Current commander: Commanding Officer: CAPT Michael R. Laraya Executive Officer: CMDR Karrie “Panda” Lang Command Master Chief: CMDCM Robert A. Lewis

The Naval Computer and Telecommunications Station (NCTS) Far East is a Navy military unit headquartered in Yokosuka, Japan. The unit consists of nine geographically dispersed sites in Japan, South Korea, Singapore, and Diego Garcia. NCTS Far East's mission is to "operate and defend mission critical, Navy warfighting networks and communications systems necessary for U.S. Naval, Joint, and Coalition Commanders to conduct secure command and control in the United States Indo-Pacific Command (USINDOPACOM) theater of operations."

== History ==
=== 1951–1960 ===
NAVCOMTELSTA Far East was originally designated as Naval Communications Facility, Yokosuka Japan; it was commissioned on 8 January 1951, after the outbreak of the Korean War. In December 1952 U.S. Naval Radio Receiving Facility Kami Seya, Japan was completed, and the Security Group Department and general-service receivers were moved to Kami Seya. During the war, the rest of NAVCOMMFAC Yokosuka moved to Kami Seya. In 1960, the command was re-designated U.S. Naval Communications Facility Japan and relocated to Yokosuka. The following year, the command was again re-designated as U.S. Naval Communications Station, Japan.

=== 1990s–present ===
This name lasted until 1991, when it was changed to U.S. Naval Computer and Telecommunications Station, Japan to acknowledge the increasing reliance on computers and telephones in telecommunications. Also in 1991, NTCCs Atsugi and Sasebo and NAVCOMM Dets Okinawa and Misawa were functionally transferred to NAVCOMTELSTA Japan. 1993 saw the transfer of Base Communications Offices (BCOs) at Atsugi, Sasebo and Yokosuka to NAVCOMTELSTA Japan. In 1995 another name change to U.S. Naval Computer and Telecommunications Station, Far East occurred, with the transfer of the Communications Department from Commander Fleet Activities Chinhae, Korea to this command and the establishment of NAVCOMM Det Chinhae.
