= Sugashima-class minesweeper =

Coastal minesweepers of JMSDF

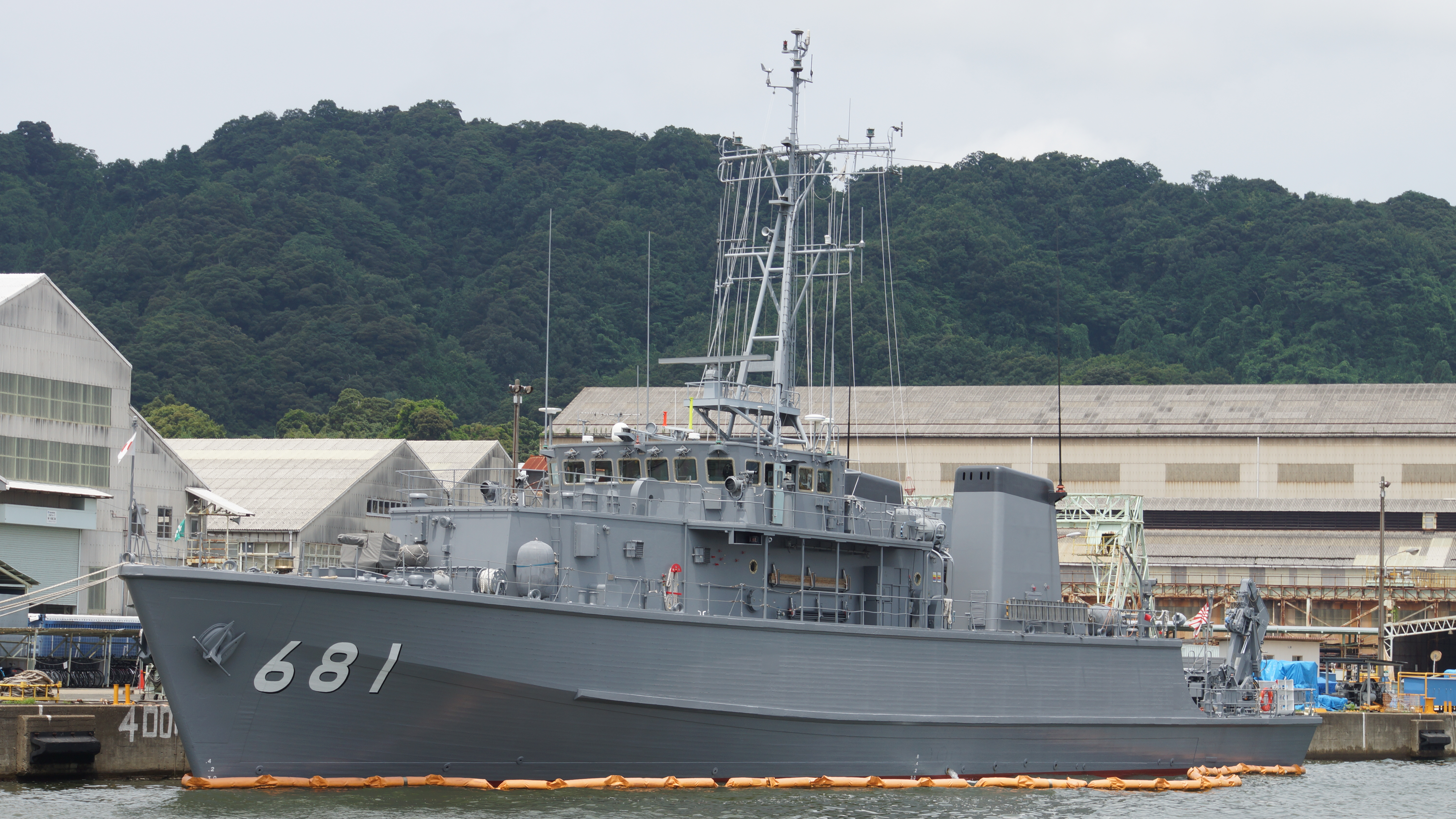
- JS Sugashima

Class overview
- Name: Sugashima
- Builders: NKK, Keihin; Hitachi, Kanagawa; USC, Keihin
- Preceded by: Uwajima class
- Succeeded by: Harishima class
- Built: 1996-2005
- In commission: 2001-present
- Planned: 12
- Completed: 12
- Active: 6
- Lost: 1
- Retired: 5

General characteristics
- Type: Minesweeper
- Displacement: 570 t (560 long tons) standard; 650 t (640 long tons) full load
- Length: 57 m (187 ft 0 in)
- Beam: 9.8 m (32 ft 2 in)
- Depth: 4.4 m (14 ft 5 in)
- Propulsion: 2 × Mitsubishi 6NMU diesel electric engines; 2 × shafts
- Speed: 14 kn (26 km/h; 16 mph)
- Complement: 48
- Sensors & processing systems: OPS-39 surface-search radar; OYQ-201 sonar; ZQS-4 sonar
- Armament: 1 × single JM61R-MS 20mm guns

The Sugashima class is a class of coastal minesweepers of the Japan Maritime Self-Defense Force (JMSDF).

== Development ==
From the lessons learned in the 1991 dispatch of the Japanese Self-Defense Forces to the Persian Gulf, the JMSDF took the example of the Royal Navy's Sandown-class minehunter, built after the 1994 plan especially in order to improve its capabilities regarding mine clearance. However, due to the fact that Sandown-class was basically a minesweeper that did not have minesweeping ability and the fact that the waters around Japan have many muddy seabeds that are not suitable for minesweeping, the abandonment of minesweeping ability was unacceptable to the JMSDF. For these reasons, the ships have the ability to sweep with Australian-made DYAD-sensitive minesweepers, but, due to magnetic management issues, it was decided that it would not be installed all the time but would be received from a mother ship at sea as needed. Operational restrictions were large, and mobility was also restricted.

== Ships in the class ==
Pennant no.	Name	Builders	Laid down	Launched	Commissioned	Decommissioned	Home port
MSC-681	Sugashima	Universal Shipbuilding Corporation, Keihin	8 May 1996	25 August 1997	16 March 1999	15 March 2023	Maizuru
MSC-682	Notojima	Hitachi Zosen Corporation, Kanagawa	8 May 1996	3 September 1997	16 March 1999	12 June 2020, after collision with civilian cargo ship on 26 June 2019	Maizuru
MSC-683	Tsunoshima	Hitachi Zosen Corporation, Kanagawa	7 August 1997	22 October 1998	13 March 2000	3 March 2024	Kure
MSC-684	Naoshima	Nippon Kokan, Keihin	17 April 1998	7 October 1999	16 March 2001	12 March 2025	Kure
MSC-685	Toyoshima	Hitachi Zosen Corporation, Kanagawa	26 April 1999	13 September 2000	14 March 2002	25 March 2026	Sasebo
MSC-686	Ukushima	Nippon Kokan, Keihin	17 May 2000	17 September 2001	18 March 2003	Sunk off Oshima 10 November 2024 after catching fire in engine room & capsizing, one sailor (Petty Officer Third Class Tatsunori Koga) killed	Sasebo
MSC-687	Izushima	Hitachi Zosen Corporation, Kanagawa	27 April 2000	31 October 2001	18 March 2003		Ominato
MSC-688	Aishima	Nippon Kokan, Keihin	17 April 2001	8 October 2002	26 February 2004		Maizuru
MSC-689	Aoshima	Hitachi Zosen Corporation, Kanagawa	15 April 2002	16 September 2003	9 February 2005		Ominato
MSC-690	Miyajima	Hitachi Zosen Corporation, Kanagawa	28 May 2002	10 October 2003	9 February 2005		Kure
MSC-691	Shishijima	Universal Shipbuilding Corporation, Keihin	23 May 2003	29 September 2004	8 February 2006		Sasebo
MSC-692	Kuroshima	Universal Shipbuilding Corporation, Keihin	12 May 2004	31 August 2005	23 February 2007		Sasebo
