= Hirado (disambiguation) =

Hirado is a city in Nagasaki Prefecture, Japan.

Hirado may also refer to:

== Places ==
- Híradó, a Hungarian news program
- Hirado Bridge, a suspension bridge in Nagasaki Prefecture
- Hirado Castle, was the seat of the Matsura clan, the daimyō of Hirado Domain
- Hirado Domain, was a Japanese domain of the Edo period
- Hirado Dutch Trading Post, a trading base of the Dutch East India Company
- Hirado Island, the island in Nagasaki Prefecture

== People ==
- Kota Hirado (平戸 航太; born 1987), Japanese politician

== Other use ==
- Hirado ware, a type of Japanese porcelain
- Japanese ship Hirado (disambiguation)
- JS Hirado the second ship of the Awaji-class minesweepers
