= Japanese ship Hirado =

Three ships of the Japanese Navy have been named Hirado:

- Japanese cruiser Hirado was a Chikuma-class cruiser launched in 1911 and struck in 1940
- Japanese escort ship Hirado was an Etorofu-class escort ship launched in 1943 and scrapped in 1947
- JS Hirado (MSO-305) is an Awaji-class minesweeper
