= Japanese ship Tsugaru =

Three ships of the Japanese Navy have been named Tsugaru:

- Japanese cruiser Tsugaru was previously the Russian cruiser Pallada launched in 1899 and renamed following capture by Japan in 1908. She was stricken in 1922 and scuttled in 1924
- Japanese minelayer Tsugaru was a minelayer launched in 1940 and sunk in 1944
- JDS Tsugaru was a minelayer launched in 1955 and converted to a cable ship 1957
