= Mine Warfare Force (Japan) =

Mine warfare force of the JMSDF

- 掃海隊群
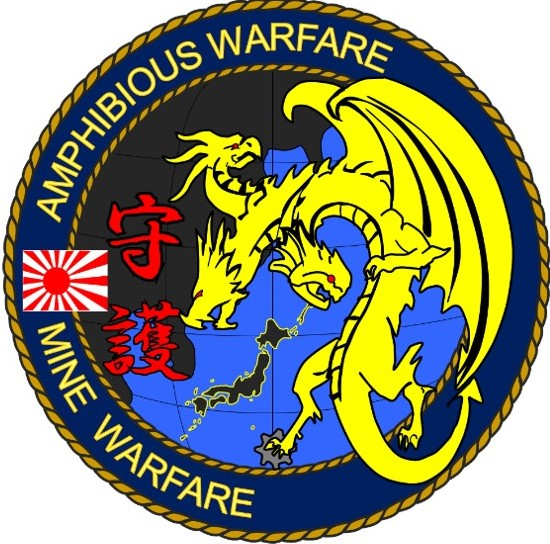
- Mine Warfare Group emblem
- Active: 1 October 1954 – present
- Country: Japan
- Allegiance: Japan
- Branch: Japan Maritime Self-Defense Force
- Role: Minesweeping; Amphibious Warfare Support
- Size: approx 900 people
- Part of: Self-Defense Fleet
- Garrison/HQ: Yokosuka
- Anniversaries: 1 October
- Website: https://www.mod.go.jp/msdf/mf/

Commanders
- Commander: Major general Tatsuya Fukuda
- Chief of Staff: Colonel Keiji Yoshida
- Operation Chief Staff: Colonel Kiyoo Omatsu
- Commander of Amphibious Warfare: Colonel Toshihiro Takaiwa

The Mine Warfare Force belonged to the minesweeping force for the self-defense fleet of the Maritime Self-Defense Forces. Its main task is to lay naval mines in the event of an emergency, and it also helps to dispose of mines installed during World War II.

== 1st Mine Warfare Force ==
With the surrender of 1945, Japan was demilitarized based on the Potsdam Declaration, and the Imperial Japanese Navy was also dissolved. However, at the end of the war, 55,347 moored minesweepers of the Japanese Navy and 6,546 minesweepers of the Allied Forces remained in the waters near Japan. Based on the instructions of the Commander-in-Chief General Headquarters (GHQ), a minesweeping department was set up by the Military Affairs Bureau of the Ministry of the Navy on September 18, and 6 local minesweeping departments and 17 local minesweeping branches were set up on October 10. Then, the minesweeping force was revived. With the end of the war, the Ministry of the Navy was gradually reduced and dismantled, but under the command of Colonel Kyuzo Tamura, the minesweeping unit changed to the Minesweeping Division of the General Affairs Department of the Demobilization Agency and the Minesweeping Supervision Department, and after the Demobilization Agency closed. It was moved to the Minesweeper Division of the Minesweeper Department of the Ministry of the Navy.

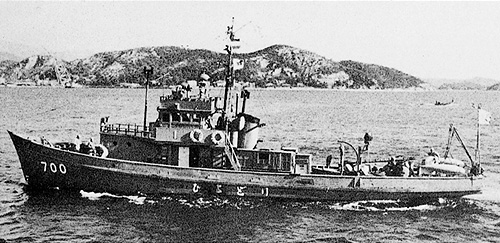
JDS Hiyodori

On the other hand, as the deterioration of maritime security due to the disappearance of the Japanese Navy became more serious, in 1948, the Japan Coast Guard was established as a law enforcement agency under the Ministry of Transport, incorporating these minesweeping units derived from the former Navy. On June 1, 1950, the Minesweeping Division was separated from the Guard and Rescue Department, and the Route Enlightenment Headquarters was established in the center and the Route Enlightenment Department was established in the regions as an organization under the direct control of the Secretary. In addition, along with the revision of the organization on June 1, 1951, the whole country was divided into nine coast guard zones, and a route enlightenment department was set up at the coast guard headquarters of each district, and minesweepers were distributed and deployed in each district. Meanwhile, in 1950, the Japanese Special Sweeping Corps was dispatched in response to the Korean War. Although the minesweeping work produced one line of duty, it was highly evaluated by the UN forces during this period when the minesweeping force was extremely weak, and it also led to the improvement of the conditions of the San Francisco Peace Treaty.

When the National Safety Agency Guard was established on August 1, 1952, the route enlightenment work was transferred to this place, and the scavenging boats of the route enlightenment department of each district maritime security headquarters became the Yokosuka District Force. It was incorporated into the Yokosuka District Force, Yokosuka, Hakodate, Seibu, Kure, Osaka, Tokuyama, Shimonoseki, and Sasebo Route Enlightenment Corps (Maizuru District Force, Maizuru, Niigata Route Enlightenment Corps). In order to improve the efficiency of minesweeping work, the 1st to 10th minesweeping forces were formed on November 1 and incorporated into each route enlightenment team, and on September 16, 1953, the route enlightenment team was in charge. As the operations were transferred to the new base corps and base guard, the route enlightenment corps was progressively disbanded. In addition, on October 16, the Second Staff Office and the Route Enlightenment Department of each district were abolished, and a minesweeping section was set up in the security department.

The National Safety Agency Guard was renamed on July 1, 1954, to the Maritime Self-Defense Force. Minesweeping ships JDS Sōei Maru, JDS Yū Chidori and since the 7th Navy Warfare Force and the 1st Mine Warfare Force was formed as a unit under the direct control of the Secretary.

=== 1st Mine Warfare Force ===
- JDS Sōei Maru
- JDS Yū Chidori
- 4th Mine Warfare Group - Kurushima, Iwatsubame, Tomozuru, Hiyodori
- 7th Mine Warfare Group - Kamoshima, Yoshikiri, Nishikidori

== 2nd Mine Warfare Force ==
On January 18, 1955, one Bluebird-class minesweeper was acquired and recommissioned as JDS Yashima, and on March 15, seven Albatross-class (Ujishima-class) vessels were received and the 11th. Formed 12 minesweepers. After receiving three more Bluebird-class vessels, the 21st Minesweeper was formed on January 16, 1956, and two Albatross-class vessels were added, and the 13th Mine Warfare Force was formed on October 1, 1959. Was done. The 1953 from the Atada-class minesweeper of domestic minesweeper deployed also initiated as beginning and 1954 was built from level No. 1-class minesweeper was incorporated into the 101st Mine Warfare Group.

The Kasado-class minesweeper built from 1955 formed the 32nd to 40th Mine Warfare Force in place of the retired and transferred boats, and became the main force of the Mine Warfare Force. As a result of these measures on September 1, 1961, the 2nd Mine Warfare Force was formed.

=== 1st Minesweeper Flotilla ===
- JDS Hayato (Flagship, Kure)
- JDS Nasami (Kure)
- JDS Suma (Kure)
- 3rd Mine Warfare Force (Kure) - Hatsutaka, Hayatori, Hiyodori
- 21st Mine Warfare Force (Sasebo) -Yashima, Tsushima, Hashima
- 31st Mine Warfare Force (Kure) - Atada, Itsuki, Yashiro
- 35th Mine Warfare Force (Sasebo) - Shikine, Hirado, Toshima
- 101st Minesweeper Corps (Kure) - Miho, No.1-class minesweeper

=== 2nd Minesweeper Flotilla ===
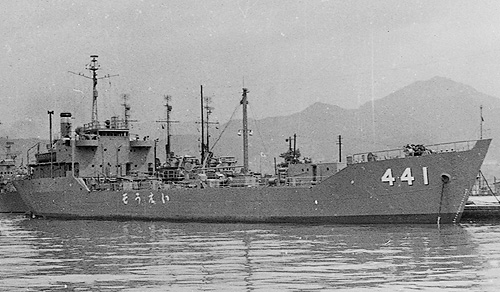
JDS Sōei Maru

- JDS Kiri (Flagship, Yokosuka)
- JDS Sōei Maru (Kure)
- JDS Tsugaru (Yokosuka)
- JDS Erimo (Kure)
- 32nd Mine Warfare Force (Yokosuka) - Kasado, Shisaka, Kanawa
- 33rd Mine Warfare Force (Yokosuka) - Sakito, Habushi, Kodzu, Tatara, Tsukumi, Mikura

On this occasion, a plan to set up a minesweeper fleet of the same rank as the escort fleet was also considered, but this did not happen, the first minesweeper group responsible for mine sweeping remained the same, and the newly established second minesweeper group was incorporated into the Self-Defense Fleet and was in charge of general coordination of research and development and education and training for minesweeping. However, during this period, a plan was made to clear the remaining dangerous sea level, and along with the first minesweeper group based in western Japan, the second minesweeper group based in eastern Japan was also put into commercial minesweeping. In March 1969, when the minesweeping area was largely cleared, the 1st Mine Warfare Force was also incorporated into the Self-Defense Fleet.

During this period, underwater disposal teams were being formed in each district unit due to the need for mine hunting, but in 1965, an underwater disposal team consisting of seven members was set up at the Mine Warfare Force Command. The 1976 degrees was built from Hatsushima-class in, remote control of an unmanned underwater vehicle (ROV) mine disposal device S-4 is mounted. With the commissioning of the same type, the 10th Mine Warfare Group below the 11th Mine Warfare Group was revived and assigned to each Mine Warfare Force, the 40th Mine Warfare Group became the local force while the 30th Mine Warfare Group became a support ship.

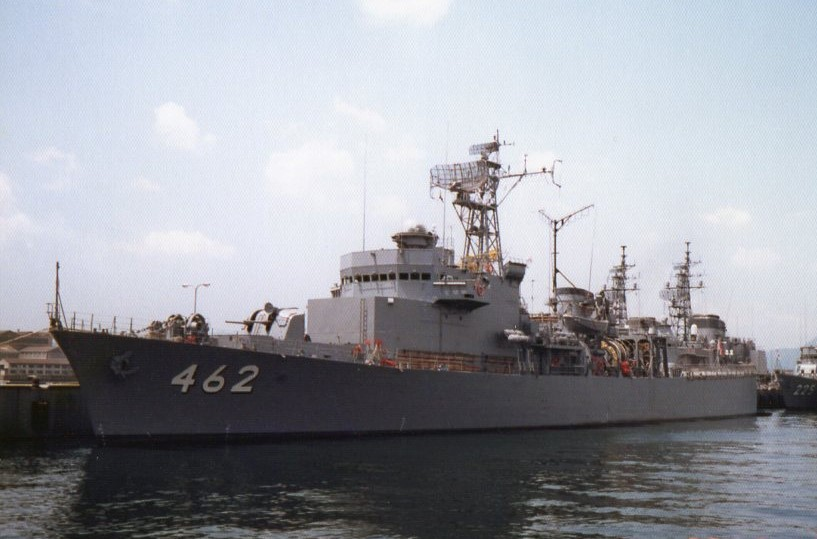
JDS Hayase

=== 1st Minesweeper Flotilla ===
- JDS Hayase (Flagship, Kure)
- 14th Mine Warfare Group (Sasebo) - Yakushima, Narushima, Hikoshima
- 16th Mine Warfare Group (Kure) - Nuwajima, Etajima
- 18th Mine Warfare Group (Kure) -Takashima, Himeshima
- 19th Mine Warfare Group (Kure) - Ogishima, Moroshima, Yurishima

=== 2nd Minesweeper Flotilla ===
- JDS Sōya (Flagship, Yokosuka)
- 13th Mine Warfare Group (Yokosuka) - Oshima, Niijima
- 15th Mine Warfare Group (Yokosuka) - Chichijima, Torishima
- 17th Mine Warfare Group (Yokosuka) - Hahajima, Kamishima
- 20th Mine Warfare Group (Yokosuka) - Ukishima, Awashima, Sakushima

== Mine Warfare Force ==
1970s than the Soviet Navy had promoted the development of anti-submarine mines, the Maritime Self-Defense Force in the, especially the Bungo Channel, Uraga Channel when installed mines in two choke points, each Kure bases of the 1st underwater disposal team. As the activities of the 2nd Submarine Force at Yokosuka Naval Base were greatly affected, the development of the ability to deal with deep anti-submarine mines became extremely urgent. For this reason, the Uwajima-class, which has the ability to deal with mines in the mid-depth range, and the Yaeyama-class, which has the ability to deal with deep mines, were built in the 61st medium-term defense.

On the other hand, the dispatch of the Self-Defense Forces to Persian Gulf in 1991, was the first overseas dispatch for actual missions after the war, but the Prime Minister received the first special certificate of the Self-Defense Forces, and foreign navies praised the high degree of training. Received high praise from home and abroad. But through this dispatch, from the fact that compared to the United States and Europe that the mechanization and automation of mine sweeping capability has lagged behind large it has been keenly aware of. Uwajima-class based on the design of the Royal Navy of Sandown-class. Construction of the Sugashima-class has introduced a mine sweeping boat system.

The construction cost of a conventional minesweeper was about 5 billion yen, but with the same type, it was 14.6 billion yen, which jumped nearly three times. During this period, the prices of other equipment such as escort vessels and submarines also soared, while the Japanese economy remained in a slump after the period of stable growth, and as a result, the defense budget was required to be restrained. The number of minesweepers was further reduced.

The two minesweeping forces were consolidated into one, and the quantity was reduced, while the headquarters personnel that had been dispersed in the two minesweeping forces were integrated to form the group headquarters. In addition to strengthening the team by establishing a new chief of staff and increasing the number of staff, the quality has improved, such as the establishment of a minesweeping operation support team that manages data on mine tactics and waterway surveys and supports operations against mines. It is planned. In line with this, the name was changed from Minesweeper Flotilla to Mine Warfare Force, and from 2005, the group commander was upgraded to a designated assistant general, and in line with the escort fleet and submarine fleet. Became one of the four Forces that make up the Self-Defense Fleet.

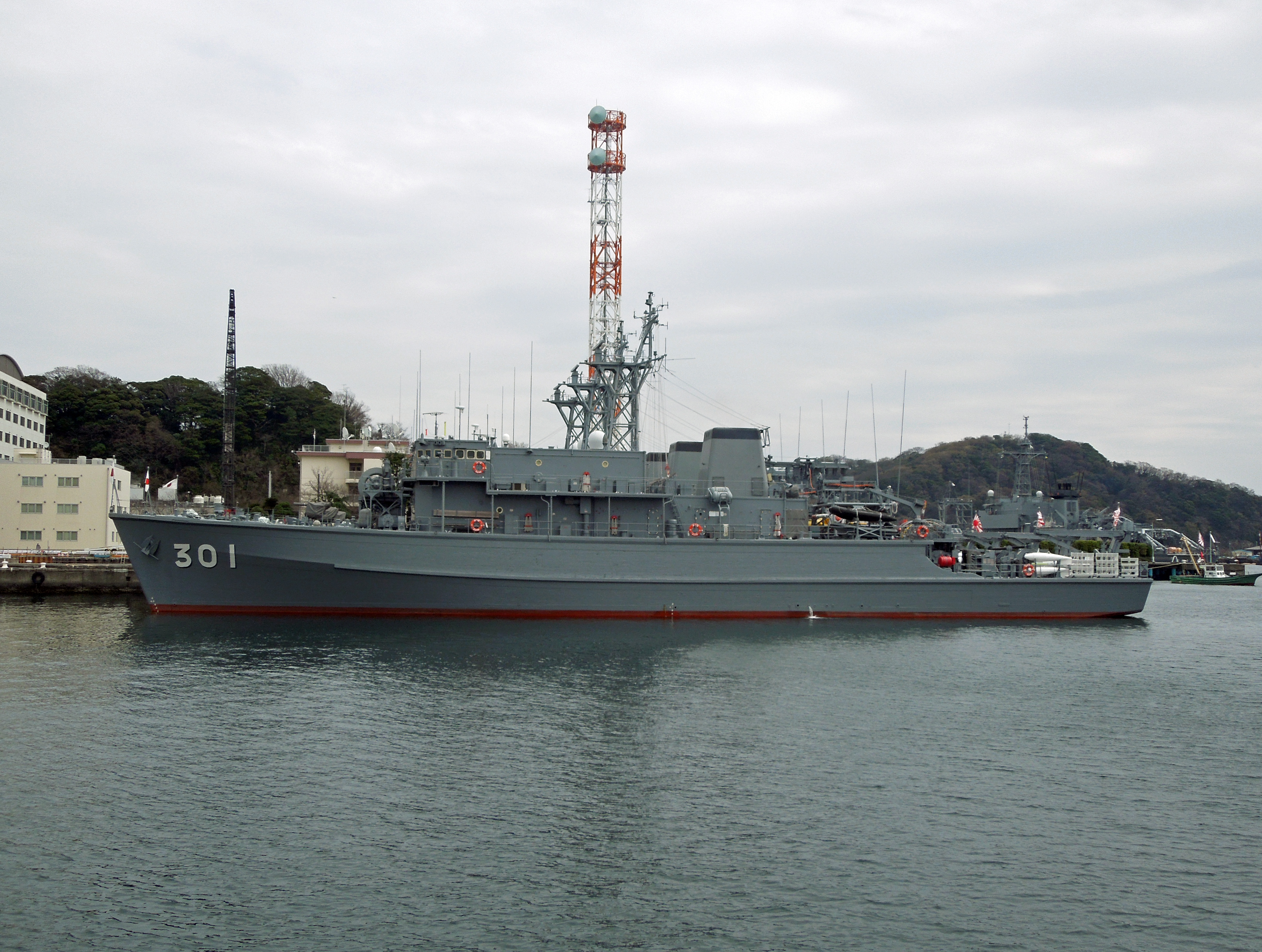
JS Yaeyama

=== Mine Warfare Force ===
- JS Uraga
- JS Bungo
- 1st Mine Warfare Group (Kure) - Tobishima, Yugeshima, Nagashima
- 2nd Mine Warfare Group (Sasebo) - Ogishima, Naoshima, Toyoshima
- 3rd Mine Warfare Group (Yokosuka) - Sugashima, Notojima, Tsushima
- 51st Mine Warfare Group (Yokosuka) - Yaeyama, Tsushima, Hachijō
- 101st Minesweeping Corps (Kure) - Yakushima, Hahajima
- Minesweeping Support Team (Yokosuka)

== Amphibious Operations ==
In May 2013, the Ground Self-Defense Force of the Western Army Infantry Regiment with, Maritime Self-Defense Force is the United States Navy, Marine Corps Dawn Blitz 13 exercises (Operation Dawn Blitz) participated in. At this point, any of the Minesweeping Group and the convoy group amphibious warfare not fixed is either responsible for, all of the exercises participation naval vessels escort fleet since it was the affiliation, the 2nd Convoy Group Commander (Major General Hideki Yuasa) became a training controller on the Japanese side.

However, in the 7th Fleet, which is the counterpart on the US side, CTF 76, which was in charge of amphibious operations, has put the anti-thunder warfare unit and the landing operation unit together under the control, so from the aspect of cooperation between Japan and the United States It was more rational for the Japanese side to have a similar system. In addition, in support activities for the 2011 Great East Japan Earthquake, the 4th Maritime Disaster Unit, which is a Minesweeping Group, entered deep into the bay by taking advantage of the characteristics that the draft is shallow and it can turn around quickly and that foreign substances in the water can be detected and avoided by the mine detector. However, it was active in relief activities such as searching and transporting goods.

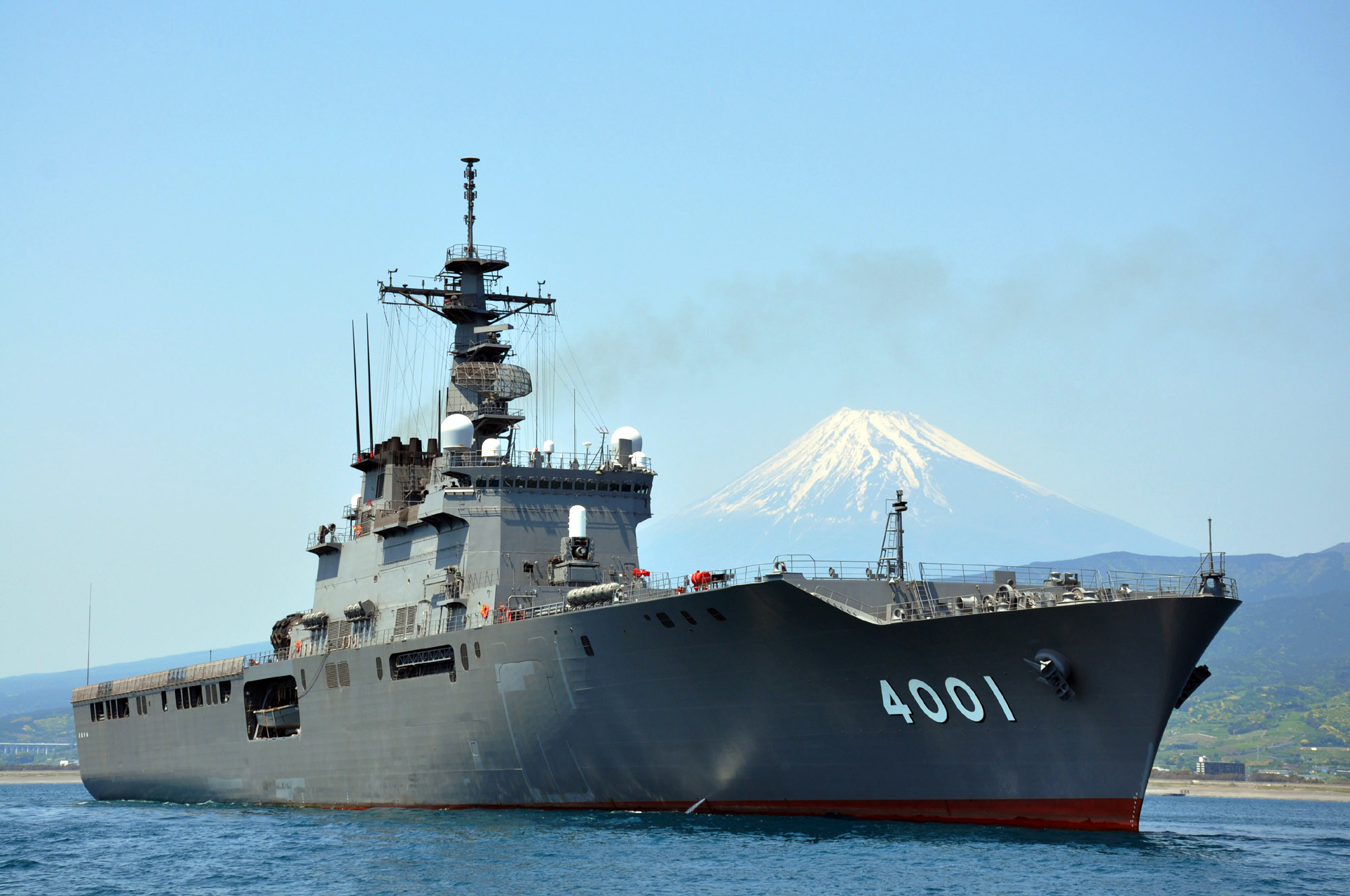
JS Ōsumi

Since the spring of 2013, the Mine Warfare Force has begun preparations such as demonstrations related to amphibious warfare on the JS Hyūga, and on August 9, the Mine Warfare Force was ready to take charge of amphibious warfare. It was reported that it was done. In September, a dual-purpose war staff member was dispatched to the Mine Warfare Force, and a liaison officer was dispatched from the Ground Self-Defense Force . In 2015, under the command of the Mine Warfare Force, participated in the Dawn Blitz 15 exercise and the US dispatch training, and in San Diego and the sea near it, a series of amphibious operations such as island defense training with the US military and the Ground Self-Defense Force .

In March 2016, Major General Yuasa, who was the training controller on the Japanese side in the Dawn Blitz 13 exercise, became the commander of the Mine Warfare Force, and on July 1, the 1st Transport Corps and the 1st Air Cushion Corpss. On this occasion, the ships under the direct control of the group and the 51st Mine Warfare Group were abolished, the 1st Mine Warfare Group was reorganized, and the 3rd Mine Warfare Group was newly formed. As a result of this amphibious operation, the staff organization, which was initially less than 20 people, has been increased to more than 50 people in total.

And in the 30 outlines decided by the Cabinet on December 18, 2018, when the outlines are completed, the number of MSCs and MSOs will be reduced to 12 in total, and to supplement this, the Mogami-class frigate will be given a mine warfare function. It was decided to secure the prescribed function. Six minesweepers and seven frigates are to be organized into two groups.

On October 1, 2020, due to the reorganization of the unit, the minesweeping boats JS Yugeshima and JS Nagashima were decommissioned and the 101st Minesweeping Corps was abolished. The minesweeping business support corps was abolished, and the amphibious and Mine Tactical Support Corps, Amphibious and Mine Warfare Center (AMWC) was newly added. In addition to conventional minesweeping operations, the team will also develop tactics for amphibious warfare and provide education and training to the crew of the new frigates, which has a minesweeping function. In addition, the Mine Warfare Force Command was relocated to the new Maritime Operations Center, a new government building of the Self-Defense Fleet Command completed in the Funakoshi area.

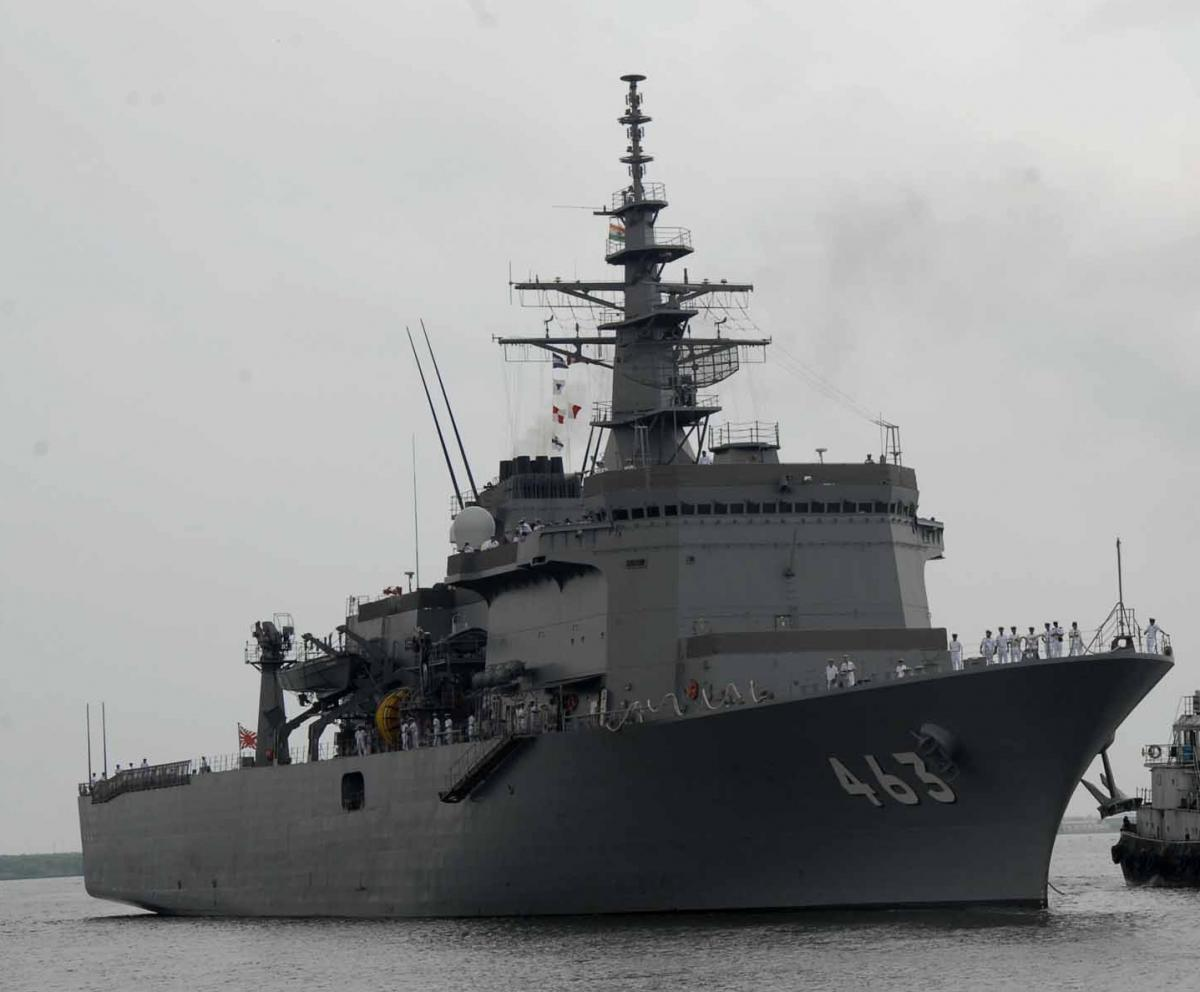
JS Uraga

=== Mine Warfare Force ===
- Mine Warfare Force Headquarters (Yokosuka)
- 1st Mine Warfare Group (Yokosuka) - Uraga, Awaji, Hirado, Hatsushima
- 2nd Mine Warfare Group (Sasebo) - Hirashima, Yakushima, Takashima
- 3rd Mine Warfare Group (Kure) - Bungo, Etajima, Miyajima
- Amphibious Warfare / Mine Tactical Support Team (Yokosuka)
  - Kure Amphibious Warfare / Mine Tactical Support Detachment (Kure)
- 1st Transport Corps (Kure) - Ōsumi, Shimokita, Kunisaki
  - 1st Air Cushion Boat Corps (Kure)
