= JS Nōmi =

Awaji-class minesweeper

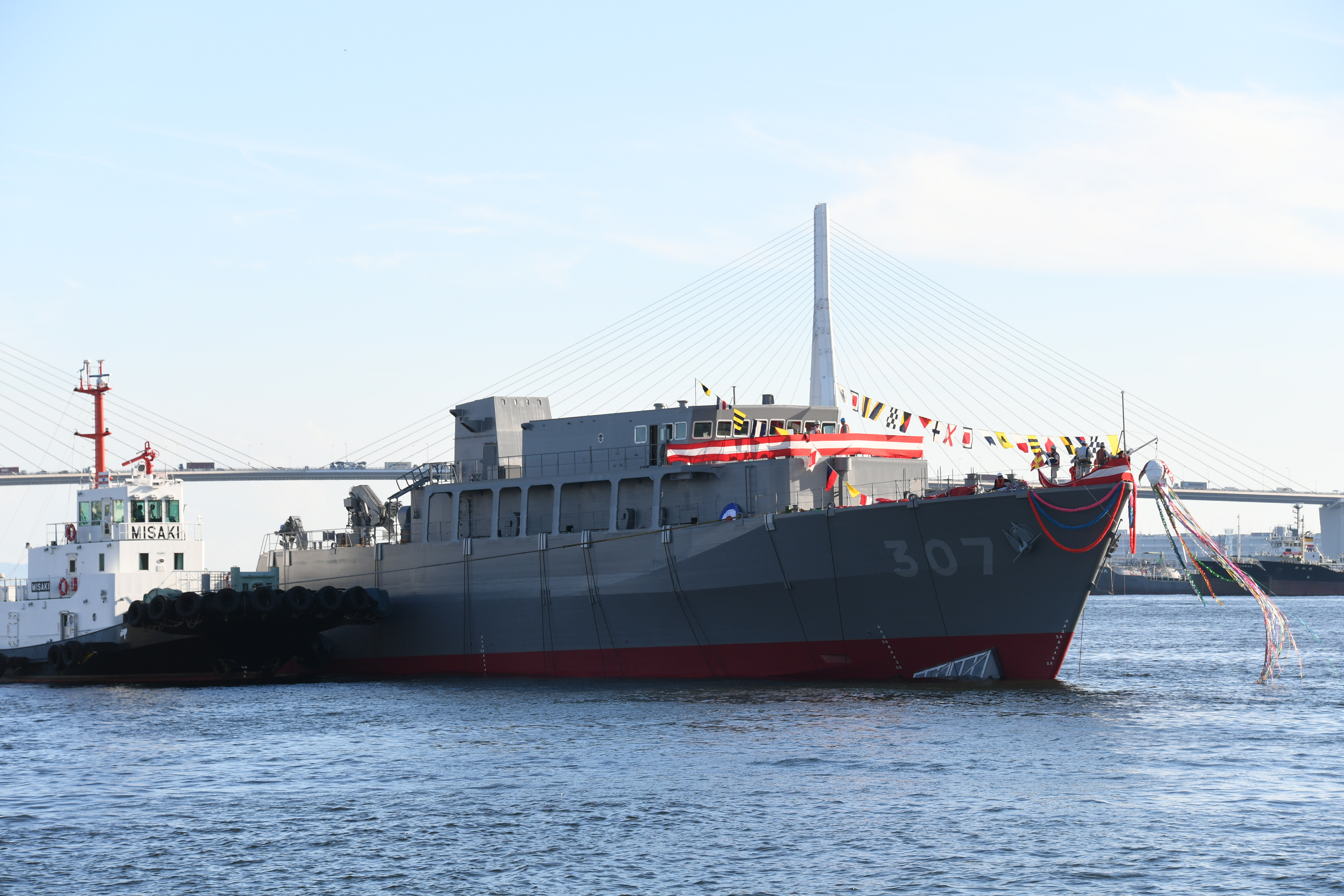
- Nōmi after being launched

History

Japan
- Name: Nōmi
- Namesake: Nōmi Island
- Builder: Japan Marine United, Yokohama
- Cost: 12.6 Billion yen
- Laid down: 19 May 2021
- Launched: 24 October 2023
- Commissioned: 12 March 2025
- Identification: Pennant number: MSO-307
- Status: Active

General characteristics
- Class & type: Awaji-class minesweeper
- Displacement: 690 t (680 long tons) standard
- Length: 67 m (219 ft 10 in)
- Beam: 11 m (36 ft 1 in)
- Draft: 2.7 m (8 ft 10 in)
- Depth: 5.2 m (17 ft 1 in)
- Propulsion: 2 × diesel electric engines; 2 × shafts
- Speed: 14 kn (26 km/h; 16 mph)
- Crew: around 50
- Sensors & processing systems: OPS-39H surface-search radar; OQQ-10-1 sonar; ZQS-4 sonar; OZZ-4 UUV
- Armament: 1 × single JM61R-MS 20mm gun

Nōmi (のうみ) is a minesweeper of the Japan Maritime Self-Defense Force (JMSDF), and the fourth ship of the Awaji class. She is named after Nomi Island of Hiroshima Prefecture, and the second ship to be named in this manner, after the Imperial Japanese Navy's Mikura-class escort ship Nōmi, as well as the first in the JMSDF era.

== Design and description ==
As with the other Awaji-class minesweepers, Nōmi's hull was built using fibre-reinforced plastic, which has better resistance against corrosion and allowed a longer lifespan of 10 more years, compared to the 20-year design life of the wooden-hulled predecessors. The LIDAR system Nōmi is equipped with allowed detection of underwater objects at long ranges. To aid in mine detection, the ship has an expendable mine disposal and variable depth sonar systems supplied by Mitsui and Hitachi respectively.

== Construction and career ==
Nōmi was laid down on 19 May 2021 at the JMU Yokohama Works Tsurumi Plant as the 307th minesweeper planned for fiscal year 2020, and she was named and launched on 24 October 2023. She was commissioned on 12 March 2025, after a period of being fitted out and undergoing sea trials.

On completion, Nōmi was assigned to the 3rd Minesweeping Squadron of the Kure Naval District, allowing Miyajima to be transferred to the 42nd Minesweeping Squadron, in turn forcing Naoshima into retirement.

== See also ==
- List of active Japan Maritime Self-Defense Force ships
