= JS Muroto (2012) =

Cable laying ship of Japan

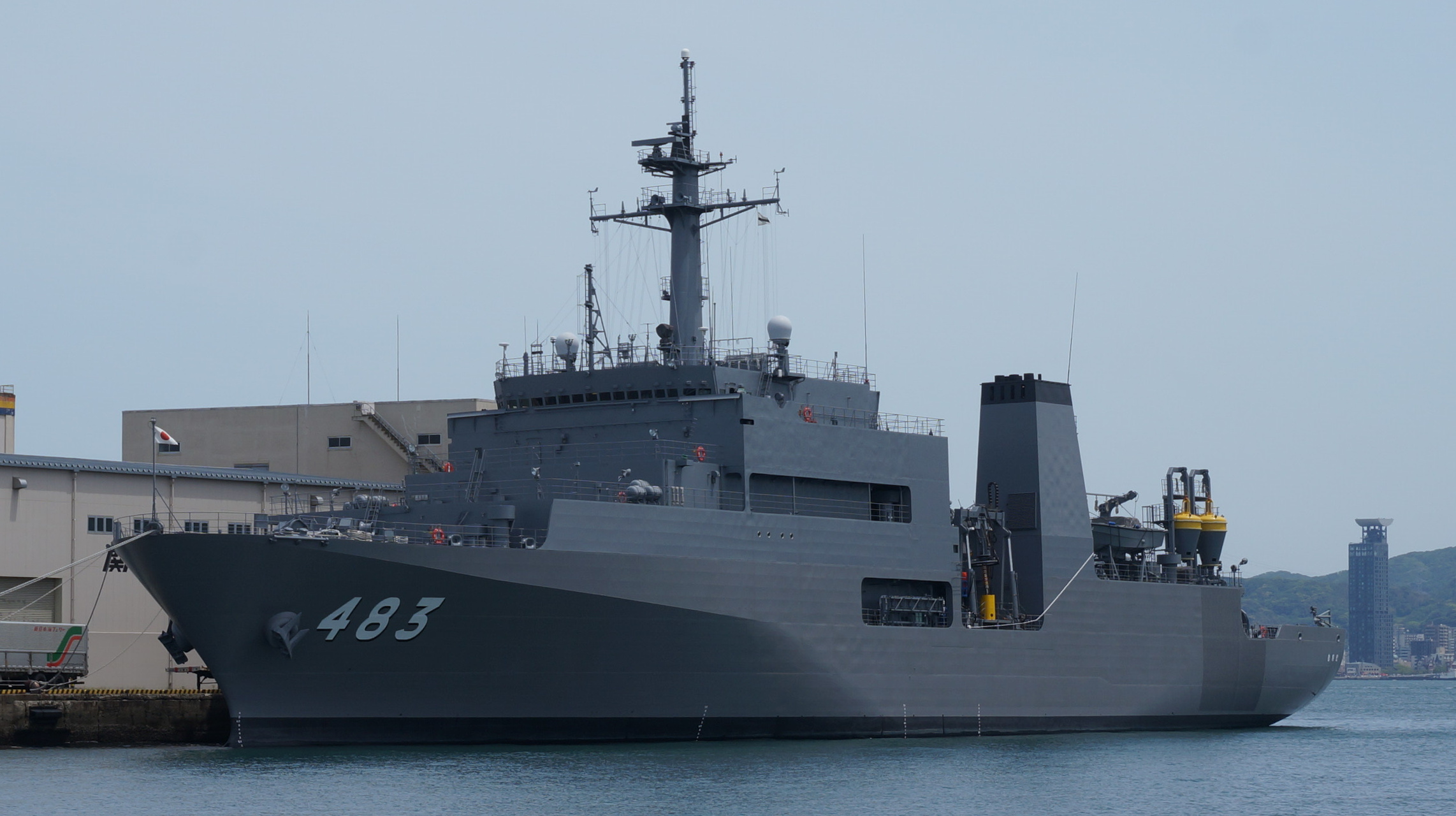
- JS Muroto on 5 May 2016

History

Japan
- Name: Muroto; (むろと)
- Namesake: Muroto
- Ordered: 2009
- Builder: Mitsubishi, Tokyo
- Laid down: 7 September 2011
- Launched: 5 July 2012
- Commissioned: 15 March 2013
- Identification: MMSI number: 431999601; Callsign: JSSR; Pennant number: ARC-483
- Status: Active

Class overview
- Preceded by: Muroto class (1979)

General characteristics
- Type: Cable layer
- Displacement: 4,950 long tons (5,030 t), standard; 6,400 long tons (6,500 t), maximum
- Length: 131 m (429 ft 9 in)
- Beam: 19 m (62 ft 4 in)
- Draft: 5.7 m (18 ft 8 in)
- Depth: 11 m (36 ft 1 in)
- Propulsion: 3 × Diesel engines; 2 × Electric motors
- Speed: 16 knots (30 km/h; 18 mph)
- Complement: 110
- Sensors & processing systems: 1 × Buried equipment; 1 × Ocean observation device

JS Muroto (ARC-483) is a cable laying ship of the Japanese Maritime Self-Defense Force.

== Development and design ==
The second generation Muroto was built with a budget in 2009 as a successor ship due to the deterioration of the predecessor Muroto (ARC-482). As with its predecessor, it seems that its main task is to install underwater hearing monitoring equipment at bases, ports, strategic sea areas, but details are not disclosed. It is equipped with cable laying equipment and various underwater equipment related to marine surveys, and the hull is equipped with bow thrusters and azimuth thrusters for smooth operation. In addition, the hull has a commercial ship structure as much as possible in order to keep the ship price down, and it is within the range that can demonstrate the minimum capacity as a laying ship.

The construction cost is about 28.4 billion yen. The predecessor Muroto was retired on 4 April 2012 without waiting for the commissioning of this ship.

== Construction and career ==
The vessel was laid down on 7 September 2011 and launched on 5 July 2012 at Mitsubishi Heavy Industries Shipyard in Tokyo. Muroto was commissioned on 15 March 2013. From 7 September to 30 October of the same year, she participated in the 33rd Guam Island Dispatch Training and conducted laying training in the Guyam Island area.

From 19 August to 8 November 2014, Muroto participated in the 34th Guam Island Dispatch Training and conducted laying training in the Guam Island area. From 31 July to 24 September 2015, the ship participated in the 35th Guam Island Dispatch Training, and with the cooperation of the United States Navy, conducted laying training in the Guam Island area. On 1 December 2015, the Oceanographic Command was reorganized into the Oceanographic Command/Anti-submarine Support Group.

From 1 July to 18 August 2016, Muroto participated in the 36th Guam Island Dispatch Training and conducted laying training in the Guam Island area with the cooperation of the United States Navy. From 10 June to 3 August 2017, she participated in the 37th Guam Island Dispatch Training and conducted laying training in the Guam Island area with the cooperation of the United States Navy.

From 20 October to 17 December 2018, Muroto participated in the 2018 Guam Island Dispatch Training (38th) and conducted laying training in the Guam Island area with the cooperation of the United States Navy. From 17 October to 5 December 2019, she participated in the Guam Island dispatch training (39th) in the first year of Reiwa, and with the cooperation of the United States Navy, conducted laying training in the Guam Island area. From 2 October to 15 November 2020, the vessel participated in the second year of Reiwa dispatch training for Guam Island (40th), and with the cooperation of the United States Navy, carry out laying training, in the direction of Guam Island.

== Gallery ==
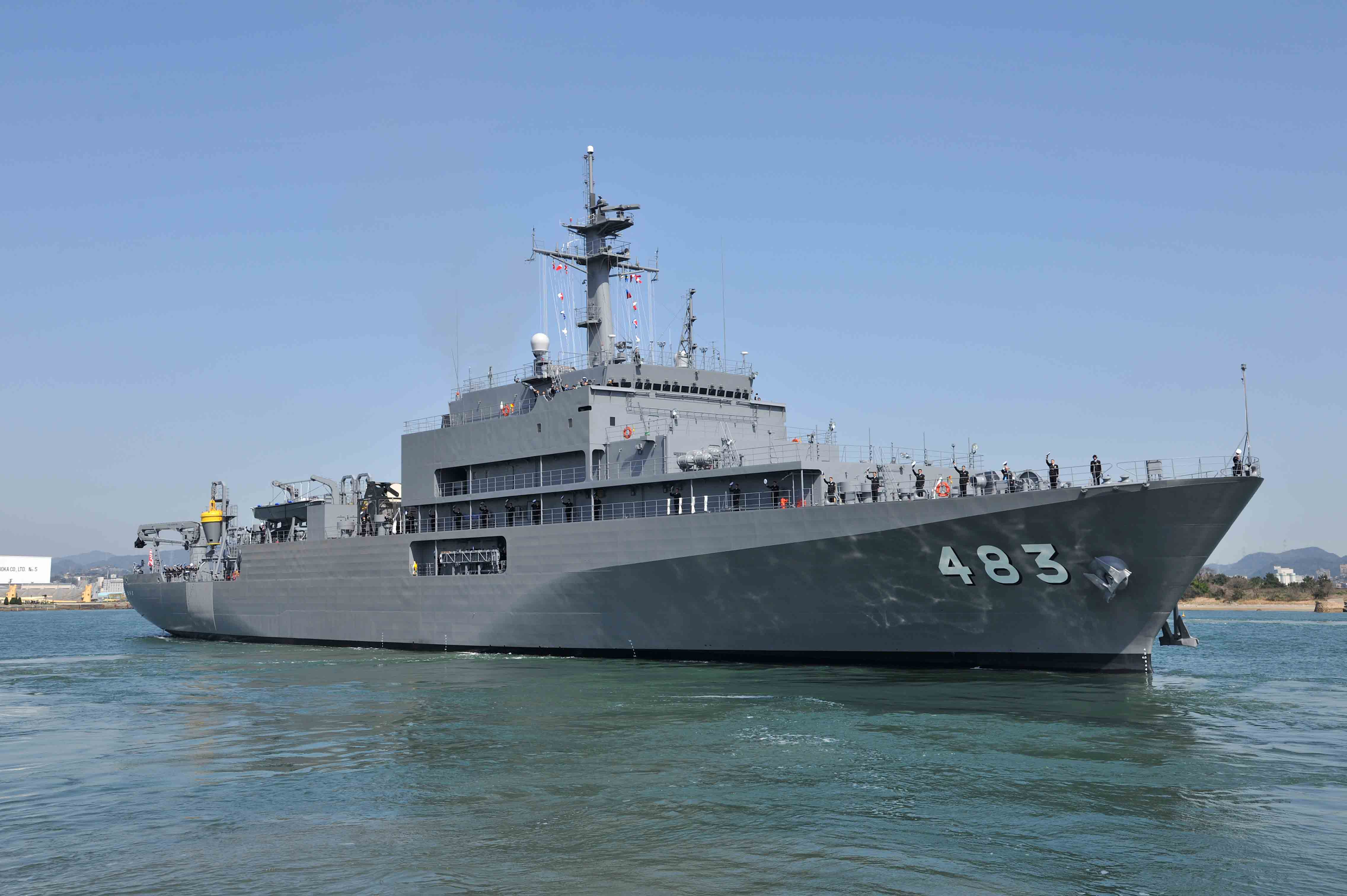
JS Muroto, date unknown.

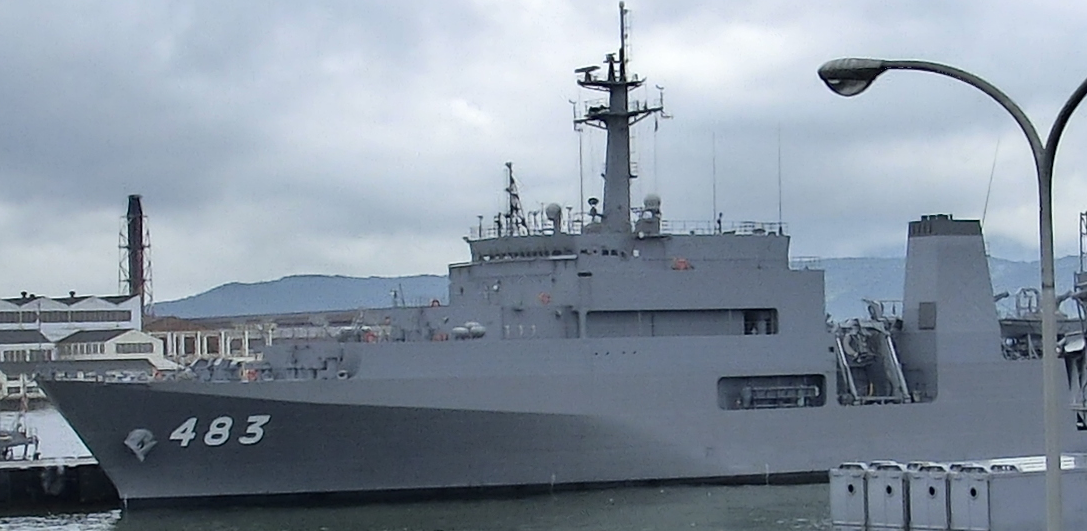
JS Muroto on 25 August 2013.

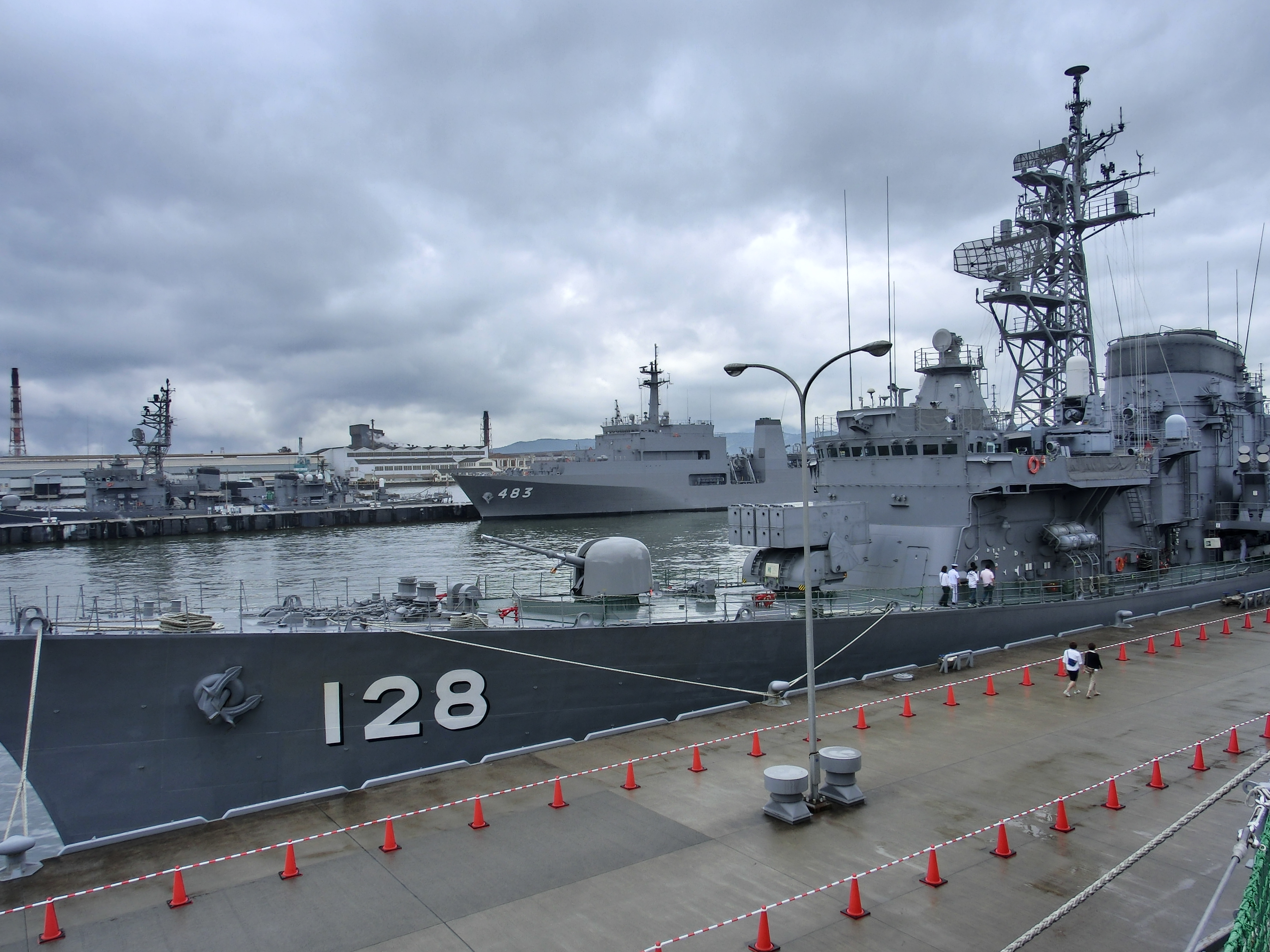
JS Muroto and JS Haruyuki on 25 August 2013.
