= JS Etajima =

Awaji-class minesweeper of JMSDF

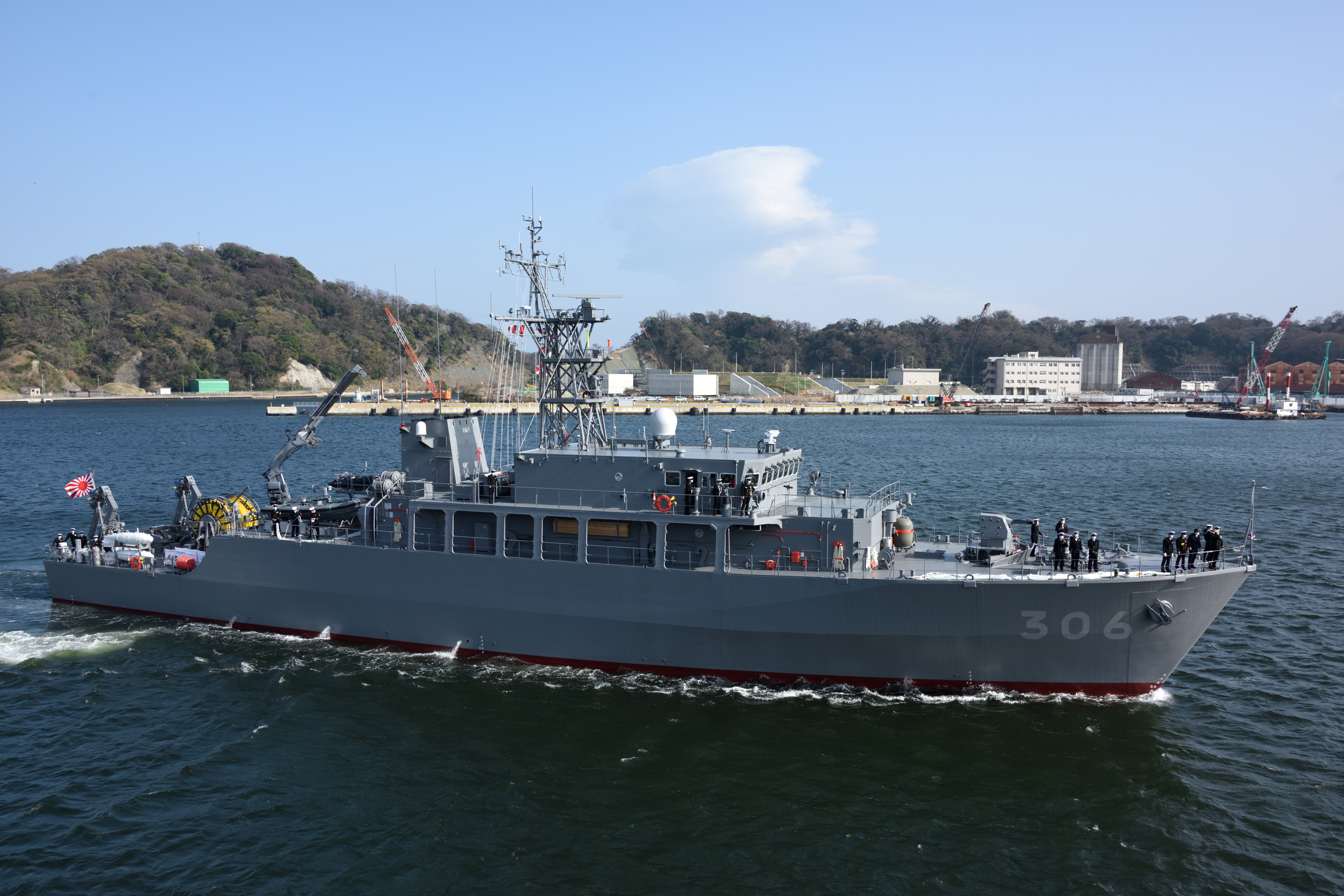
- JS Etajima underway on 16 March 2021

History

Japan
- Name: Etajima; (えたじま)
- Namesake: Etajima
- Ordered: 2017
- Builder: JMU, Yokohama
- Laid down: 22 February 2018
- Launched: 12 December 2019
- Commissioned: 16 March 2021
- Home port: Kure
- Identification: Pennant number: MSO-306
- Status: Active

General characteristics
- Class & type: Awaji-class minesweeper
- Displacement: 690 t (680 long tons) standard
- Length: 66.8 m (219 ft 2 in)
- Beam: 11 m (36 ft 1 in)
- Draft: 2.7 m (8 ft 10 in)
- Depth: 5.2 m (17 ft 1 in)
- Propulsion: 2 × diesel electric engines; 2 × shafts
- Speed: 14 kn (26 km/h; 16 mph)
- Complement: 54
- Sensors & processing systems: OPS-39H surface-search radar; OQQ-10-1 sonar; ZQS-4 sonar; OZZ-2 UUV
- Armament: 1 × single JM61R-MS 20mm gun

JS Etajima (MSO-306) is the third ship of the Awaji-class minesweepers of the Japan Maritime Self-Defense Force (JMSDF).

== Construction and career ==
Etajima was laid down on 22 February 2018 and launched on 12 December 2019 by Japan Marine United (JMU) Yokohama Shipyard. She was commissioned on 16 March 2021, and she was then incorporated into the 3rd Mine Warfare Group and deployed to Kure.

On 1 April 2025, Etajima along with JS Bungo arrived at the Port of Colombo, Sri Lanka for a goodwill visit scheduled to last until 4 April.

== Gallery ==
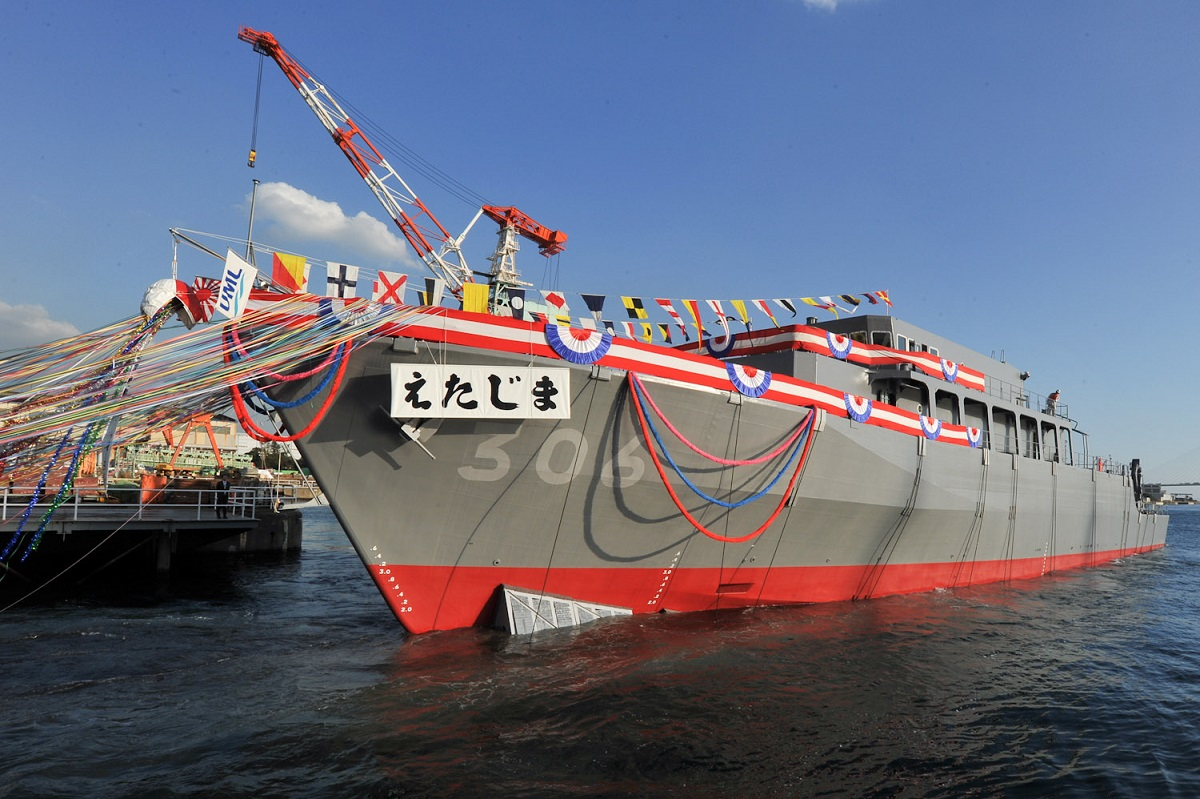
JS Etajima being launched on 12 December 2019
