= JS Muroto (1979) =

Cable laying ship of Japan

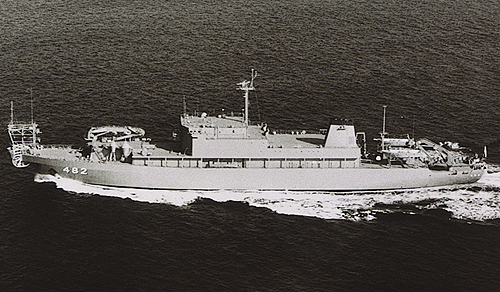
- JS Muroto

History

Japan
- Name: Muroto; (むろと)
- Namesake: Muroto
- Ordered: 1977
- Builder: Mitsubishi, Tokyo
- Laid down: 28 November 1977
- Launched: 25 July 1979
- Commissioned: 27 March 1980
- Decommissioned: 4 April 2012
- Stricken: October 2012
- Home port: Kure
- Identification: Pennant number: ARC-482
- Fate: Scrapped

Class overview
- Preceded by: Tsugaru class
- Succeeded by: Muroto class (2012)

General characteristics
- Type: Cable layer
- Displacement: 4,500 long tons (4,600 t), standard; 6,000 long tons (6,100 t), maximum
- Length: 133 m (436 ft 4 in)
- Beam: 17.4 m (57 ft 1 in)
- Draft: 5.7 m (18 ft 8 in)
- Depth: 8.6 m (28 ft 3 in)
- Propulsion: 4 × Kawasaki diesel engines; 2 × shafts
- Speed: 18 knots (33 km/h; 21 mph)
- Complement: 135
- Sensors & processing systems: 1 × OPS-9 radar

JS Muroto (ARC-482) was a cable laying ship of the Japanese Maritime Self-Defense Force.

== Development and design ==
It was planned in 1977 as a substitute for the aging laying ship Tsugaru (ARC-481). As with its predecessor, its main task is to install underwater hearing monitoring equipment at bases, ports, strategic sea areas. For the first time, a laying device was installed on the stern to support long-distance laying work.

This made it possible to bury submarine cables in the mud instead of the conventional bare laying, which was easy to cut in the bottom trawling fishery represented by trawling nets. The vessel had sheaves on the bow and stern, and a large cable tank was installed inside the ship, and cables were laid via the cable engine.

Since delicate maneuvering was required during laying work, the propeller is a variable pitch floperer, and the bow and stern were equipped with side thrusters. In addition, the ocean observation equipment was also substantial, equipped with precision sounding, mud sampling, water sampling equipment, thermometer, satellite navigation equipment, Omega navigation, Loran C and other navigation support equipment, and was placed in the central control room to concentrate.

Controlled and route monitoring was performed. The overall ship type was similar to the submarine cable laying ship Kuroshio Maru of the Nippon Telegraph and Telephone Public Corporation, and is said to be used as a reference for the design of this ship.

== Construction and career ==
The ship was laid down on 28 November 1977 and launched on 25 July 1979 at Mitsubishi Heavy Industries Shipyard in Tokyo. Muroto commissioned on 27 March 1980.

She was retired on 4 April 2012 without waiting for the commissioning of the successor ship Muroto (ARC-483). After that, in October 2012, she left Kure base for Dokai Bay, Kitakyushu for dismantling. Parts of her are on display at JMSDF Kure Museum.

== Gallery ==
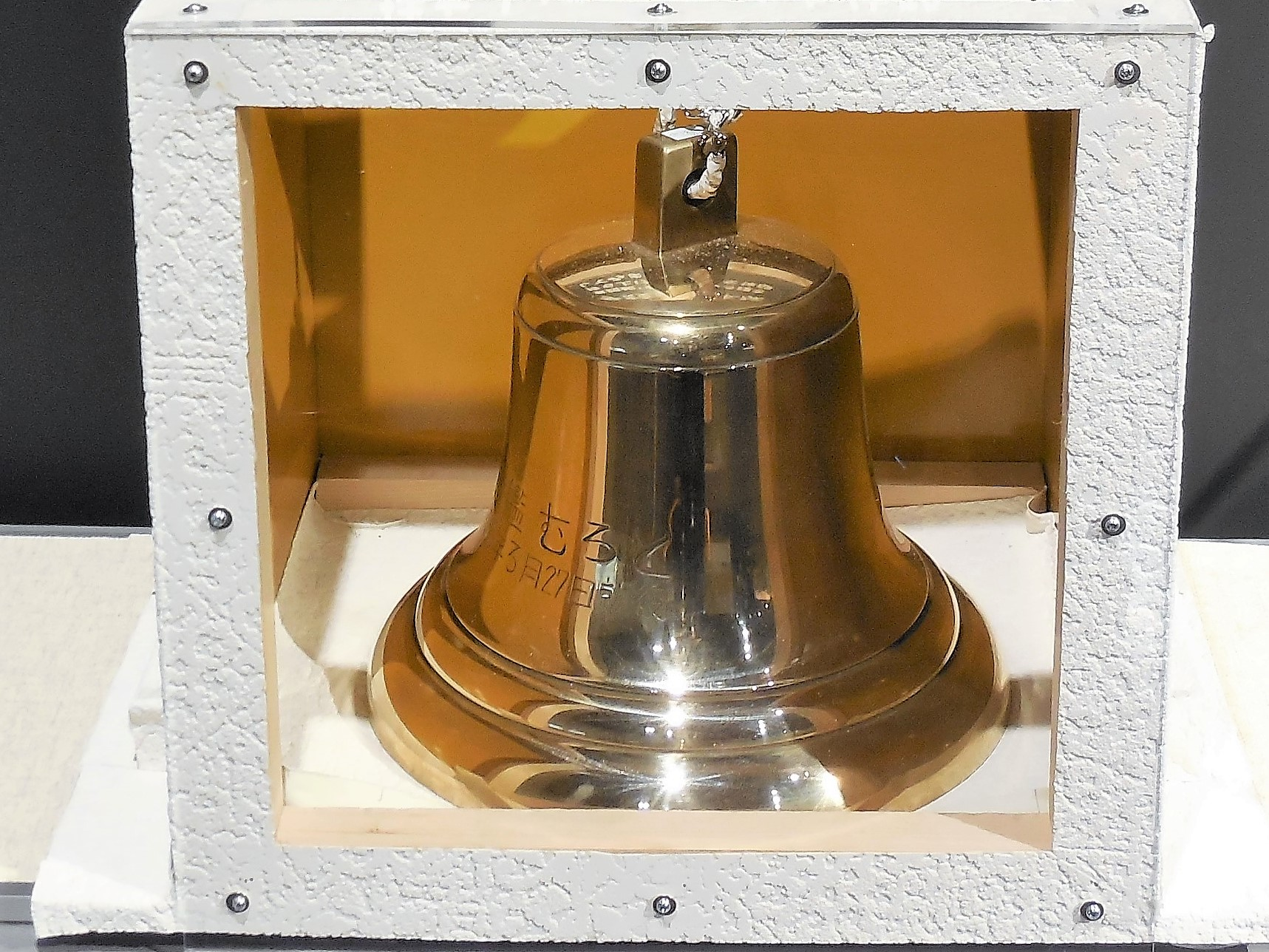
JS Muroto's bell on display.

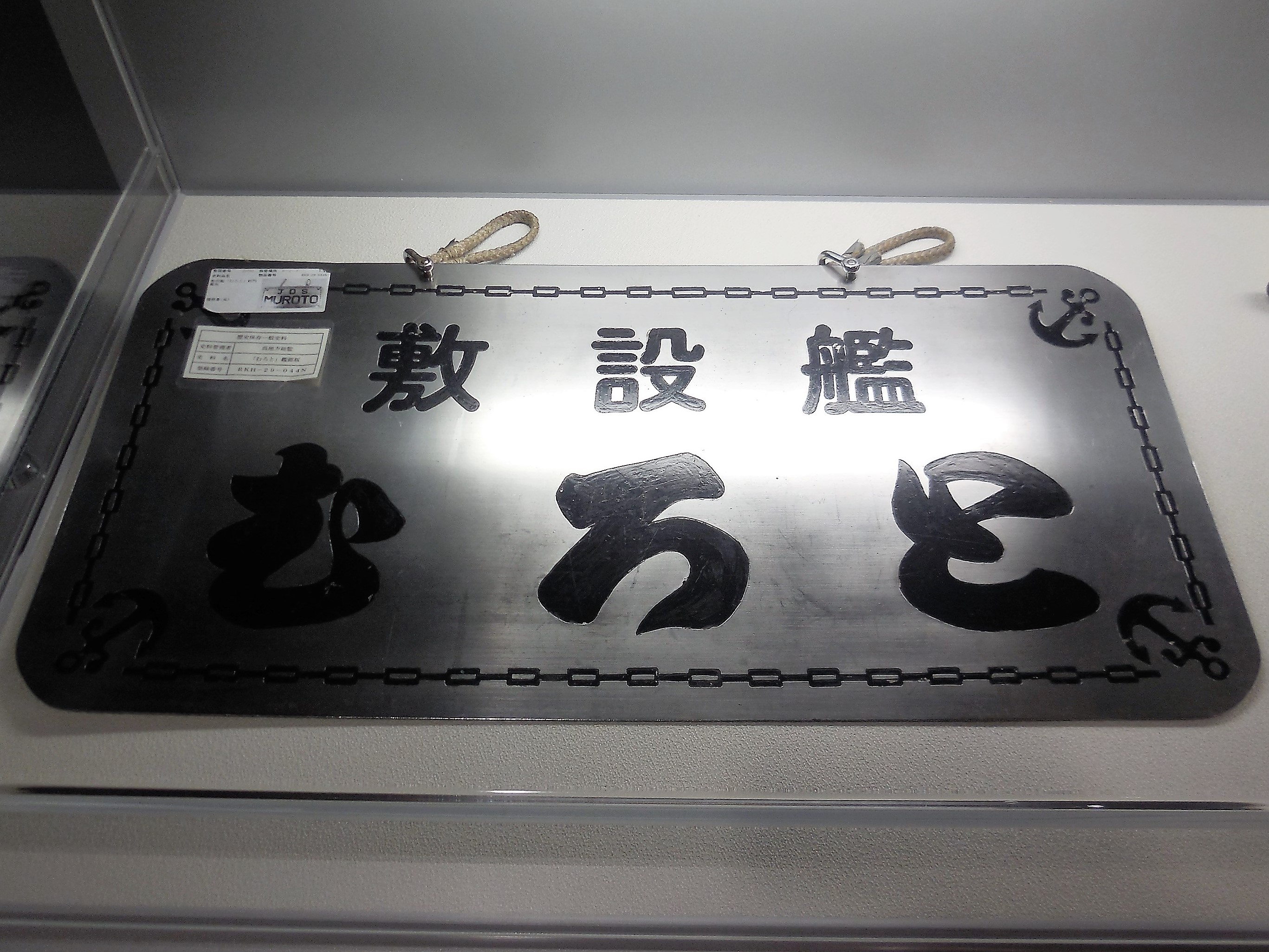
JS Muroto's name plate on display.

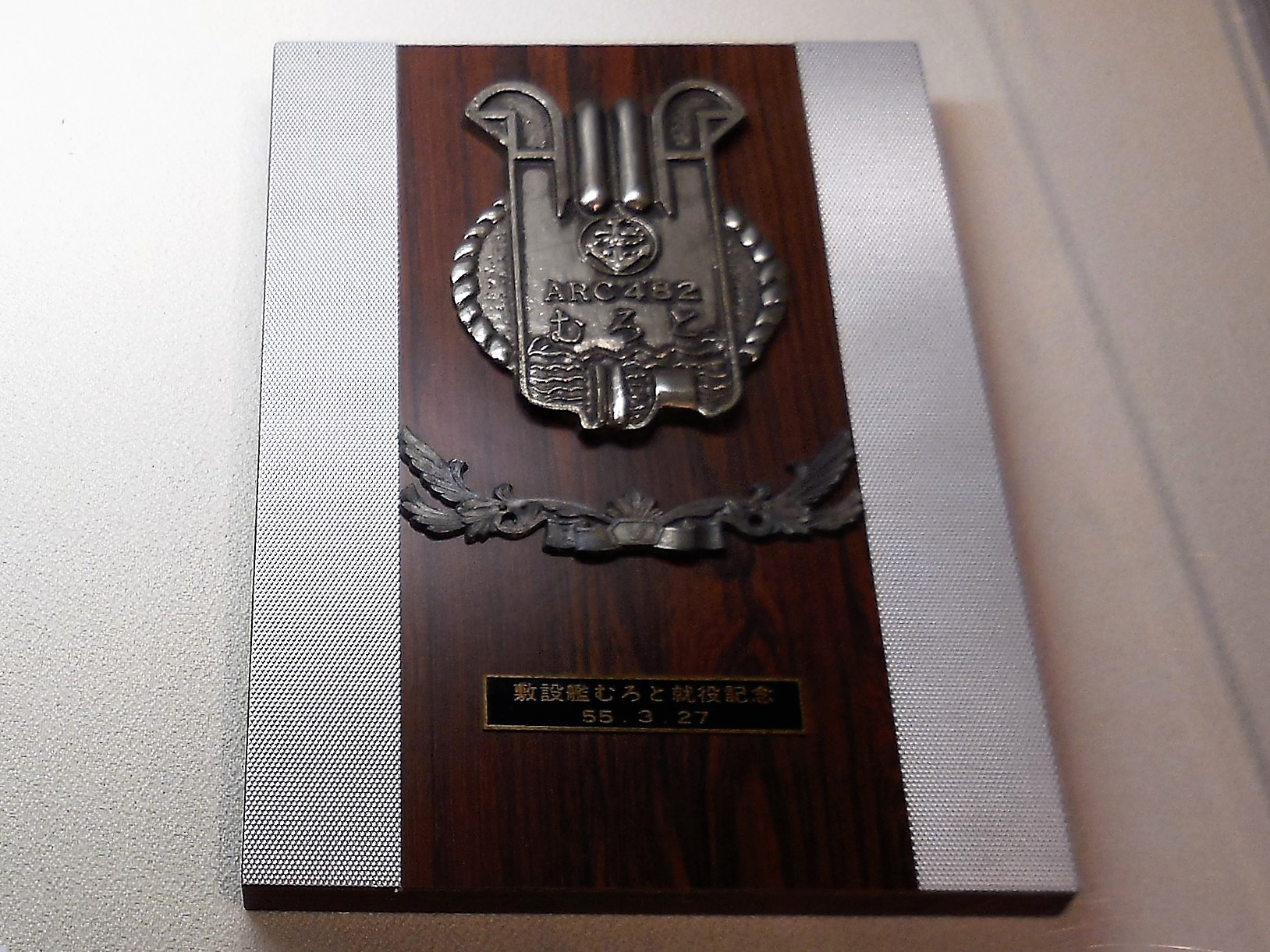
JS Muroto's commissioning commemorative shield on display.

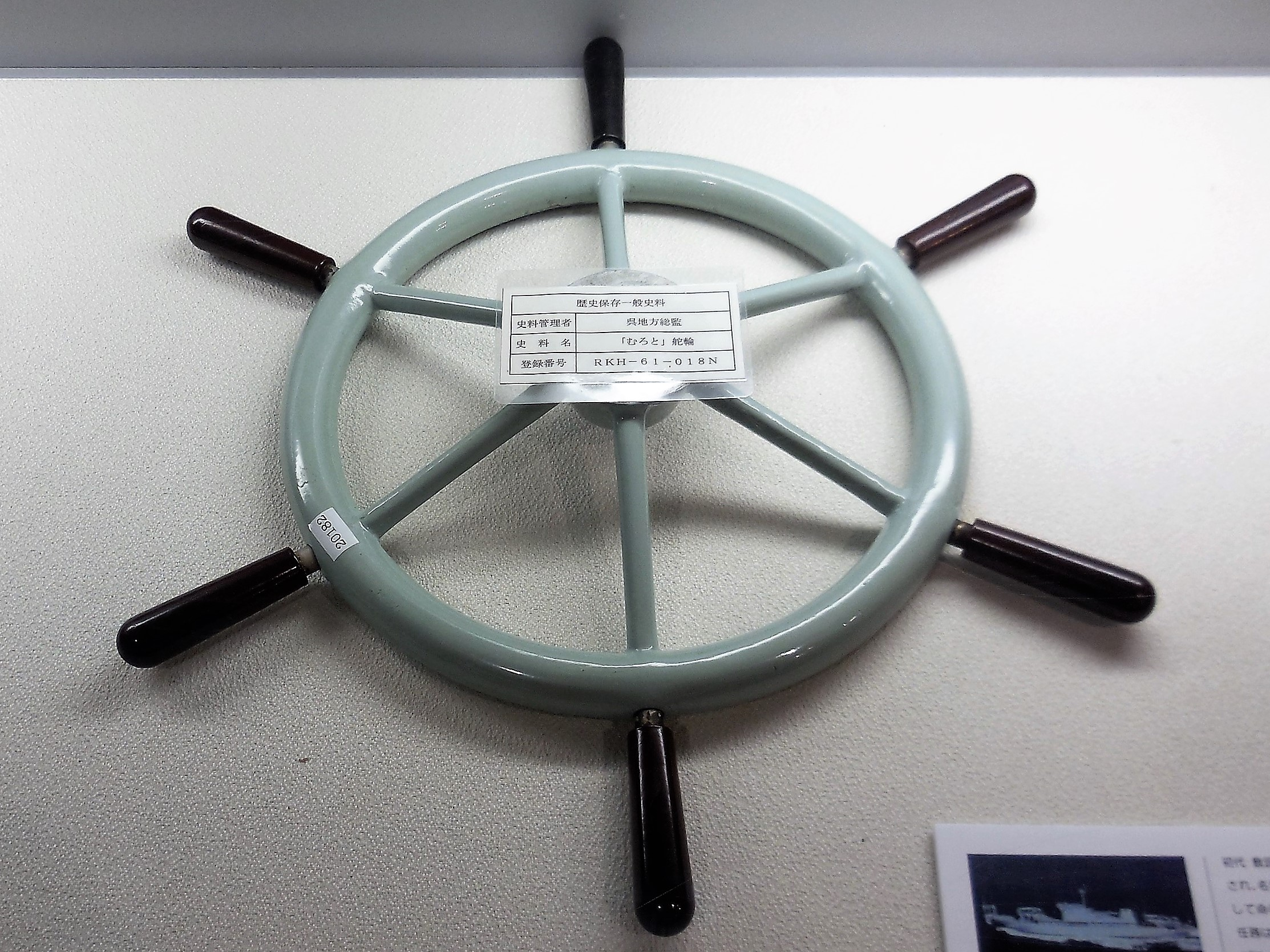
JS Muroto's ship wheel on display.
