= JS Kerama =

Awaji-class minesweeper

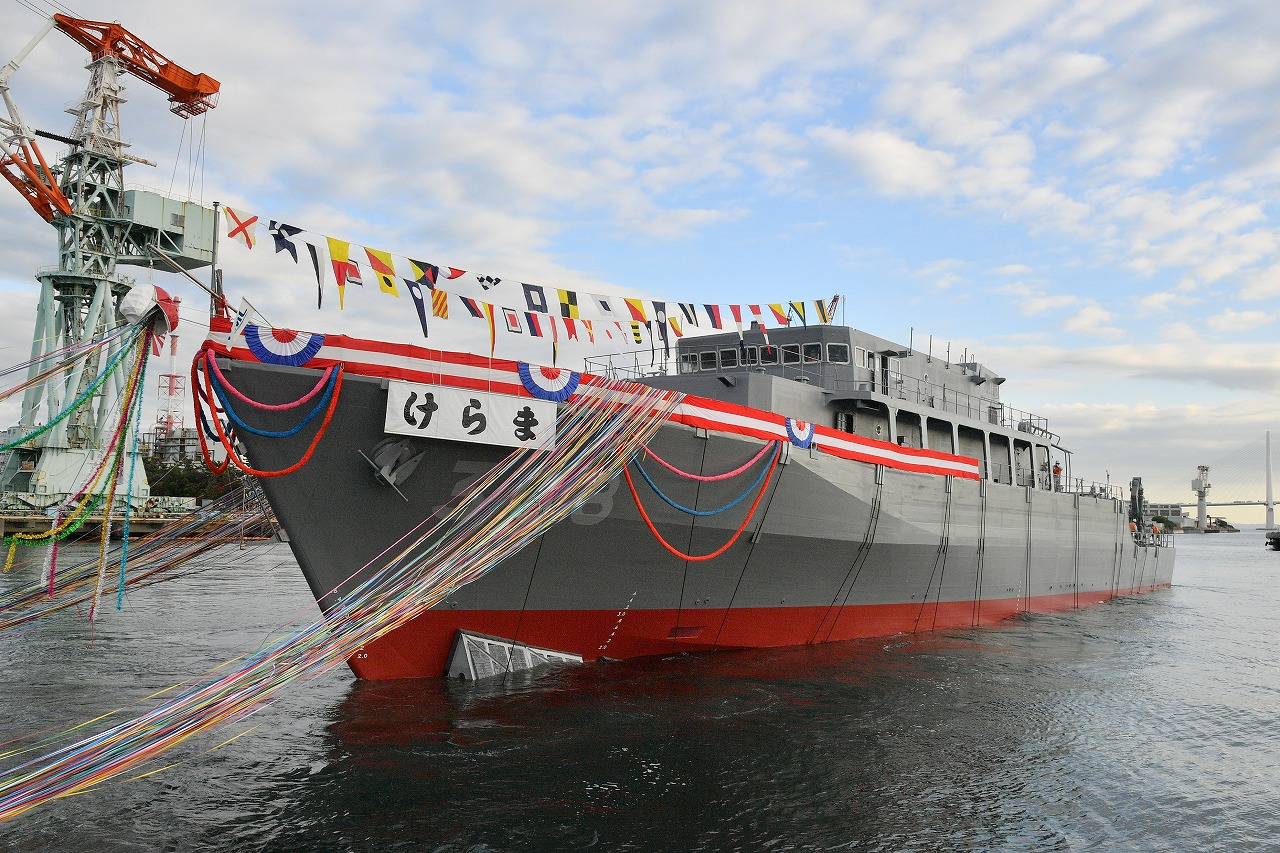
- JS Kerama during her launch ceremony

History

Japan
- Name: Kerama; (けらま)
- Namesake: Kerama Islands
- Ordered: 2022
- Builder: JMU, Yokohama
- Laid down: 20 July 2023
- Launched: 18 December 2025
- Commissioned: 2026 (scheduled)
- Identification: Pennant number: MSO-308
- Status: To be commissioned

General characteristics
- Class & type: Awaji-class minesweeper
- Displacement: 690 t (680 long tons) standard
- Length: 66.8 m (219 ft 2 in)
- Beam: 11 m (36 ft 1 in)
- Draft: 2.7 m (8 ft 10 in)
- Depth: 5.2 m (17 ft 1 in)
- Propulsion: 2 × diesel electric engines; 2 × shafts
- Speed: 14 kn (26 km/h; 16 mph)
- Complement: 54
- Sensors & processing systems: OPS-39H surface-search radar; OQQ-10-1 sonar; ZQS-4 sonar; OZZ-2 UUV
- Armament: 1 × single JM61R-MS 20mm gun

JS Kerama (Japanese: けらま; Hull number: MSO-308) is a minesweeper of the Japan Maritime Self-Defense Force, and is the fifth ship of the Awaji class. She is named after the Kerama Islands, which are located near Okinawa Island; she is the first warship to bear this name, as the Imperial Japanese Navy had never used the name for its ships.

== Construction and career ==
Kerama was laid down at JMU's Yokohama Shipyard on 20 July 2023, and was later launched on 18 December 2025. She is scheduled to be commissioned in 2026 after a period of fitting out and sea trials, intended to be assigned to the Amphibious Mine Warfare Group (水陸両用戦機雷戦群) under the Surface Fleet (艦隊).
