= JS Awaji =

Awaji-class minesweeper of JMSDF

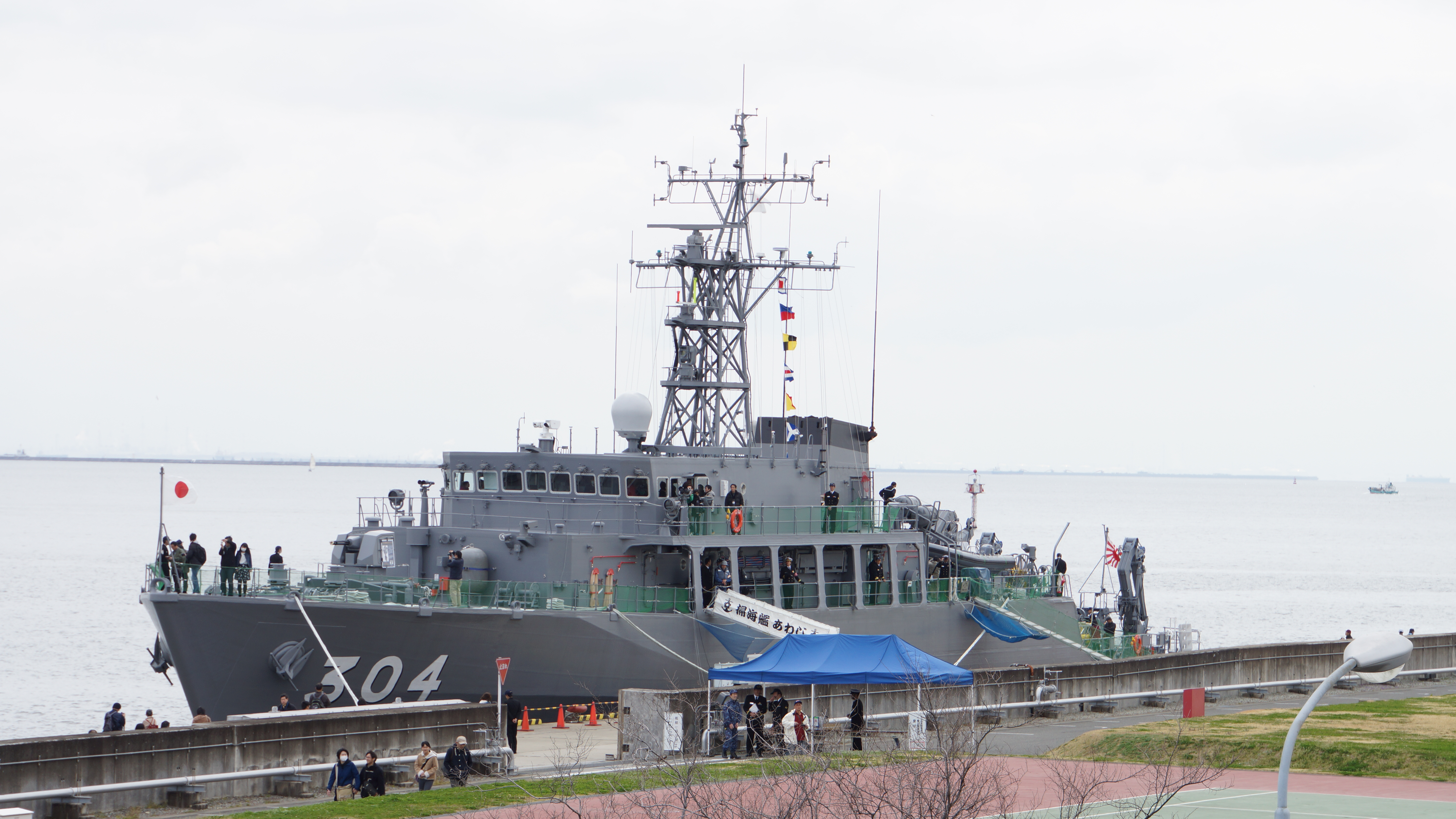
- JS Awaji on 1 April 2017

History

Japan
- Name: Awaji; (あわじ)
- Namesake: Awaji
- Ordered: 2013
- Builder: JMU, Yokohama
- Laid down: 27 February 2014
- Launched: 27 October 2015
- Commissioned: 16 March 2017
- Home port: Yokosuka
- Identification: Pennant number: MSO-304
- Status: Active

General characteristics
- Class & type: Awaji-class minesweeper
- Displacement: 690 t (680 long tons) standard
- Length: 66.8 m (219 ft 2 in)
- Beam: 11 m (36 ft 1 in)
- Draft: 2.7 m (8 ft 10 in)
- Depth: 5.2 m (17 ft 1 in)
- Propulsion: 2 × diesel electric engines; 2 × shafts
- Speed: 14 kn (26 km/h; 16 mph)
- Complement: 54
- Sensors & processing systems: OPS-39H surface-search radar; OQQ-10-1 sonar; ZQS-4 sonar; OZZ-2 UUV
- Armament: 1 × single JM61R-MS 20mm gun

JS Awaji (MSO-304) is the lead ship of the Awaji-class minesweeper of Japan Maritime Self-Defense Force (JMSDF).

== Construction and career ==
Awaji was laid down on 27 February 2014 and launched on 27 October 2015 by Japan Marine United (JMU) Yokohama Shipyard. She was commissioned on 16 March 2017, and then she was incorporated into the 1st Mine Warfare Group and deployed to Yokosuka. From July 18 to July 30, 2027, she participated in mine warfare training and minesweeping special training in Mutsu Bay.

From July 18 to July 30, 2018, she conducted mine warfare training and some Japan-US-India joint minesweeping special training in Mutsu Bay.

== Gallery ==
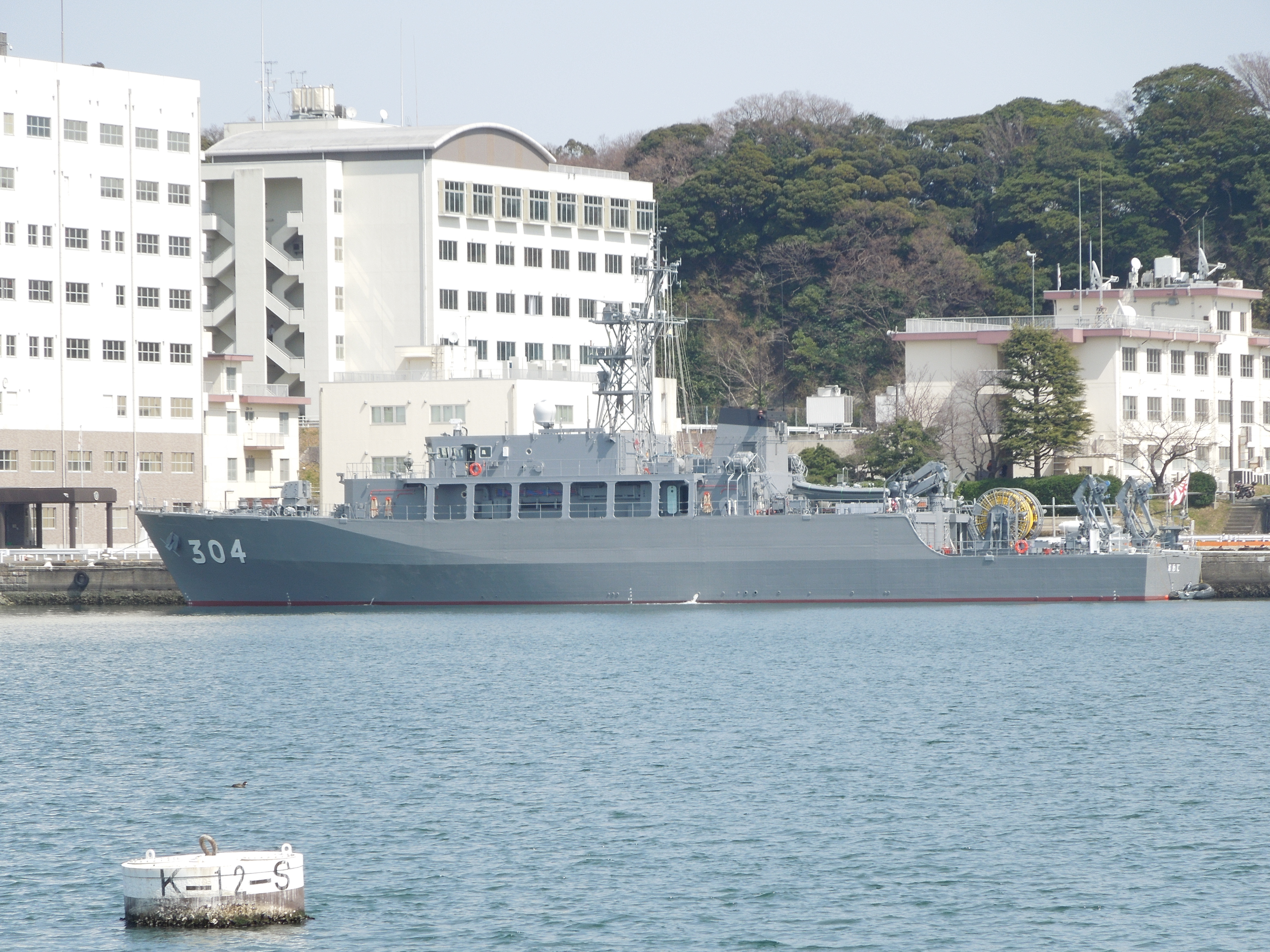
JS Awaji on 18 March 2017

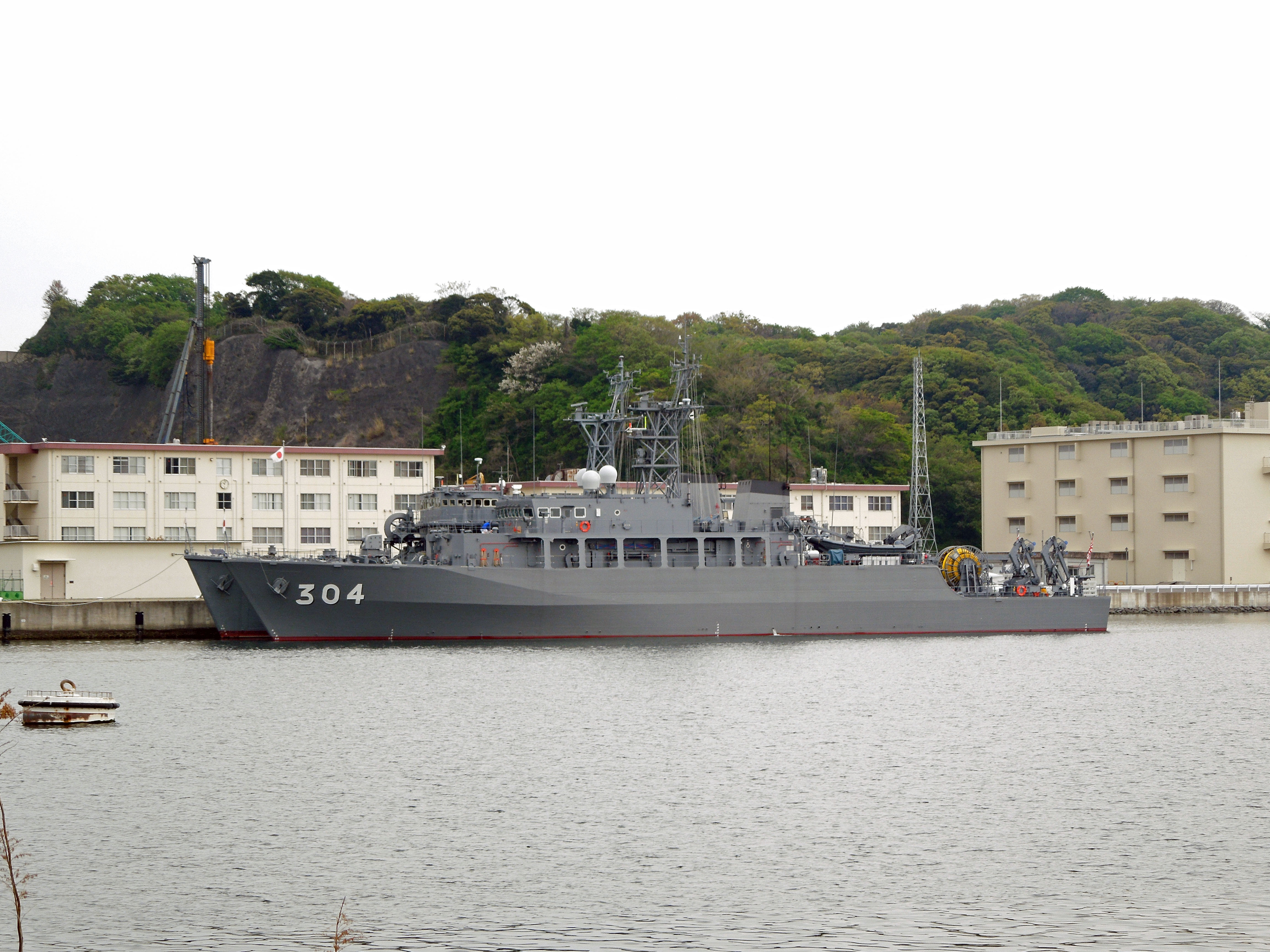
JS Awaji on 22 April 2017

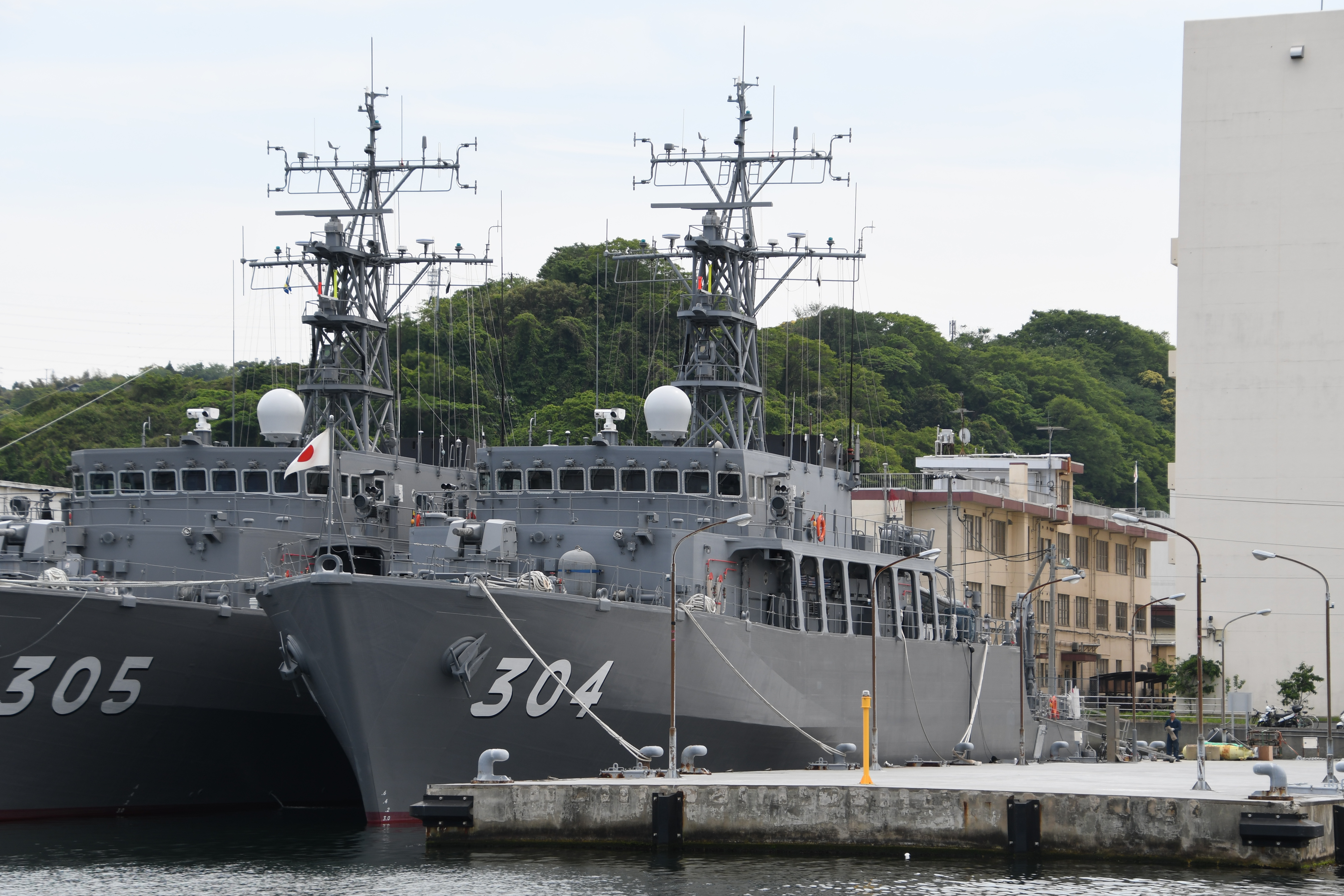
JS Awaji and JS Hirado on 30 April 2018
