= Awaji-class minesweeper =

Minesweeper of JMSDF

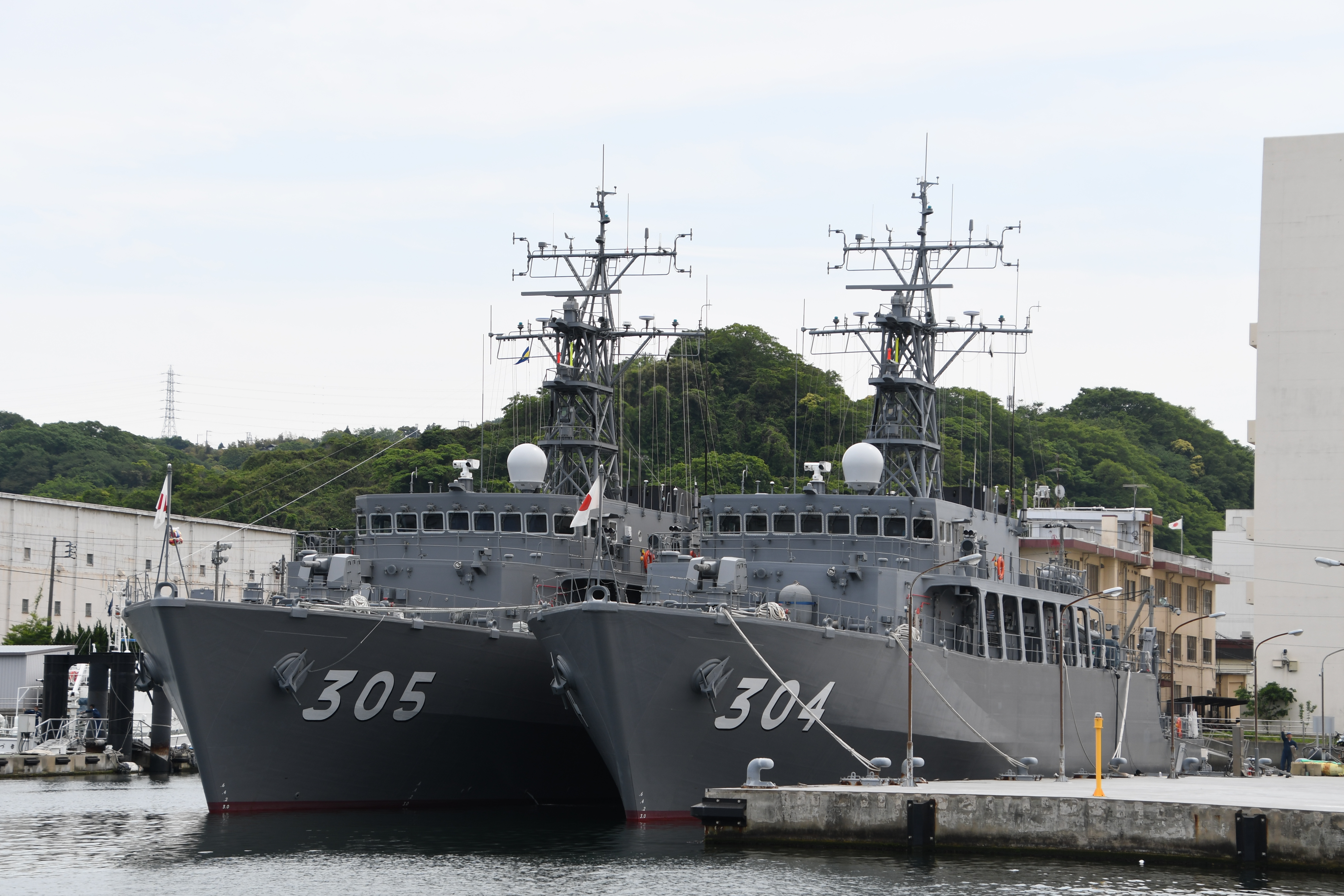
- JS Awaji and JS Hirado on 29 November 2013

Class overview
- Name: Awaji
- Builders: JMU, Yokohama
- Preceded by: Yaeyama class
- Built: 2014-present
- In commission: 2017-present
- Planned: 9
- Completed: 4
- Active: 4

General characteristics
- Type: Minesweeper
- Displacement: 690 t (680 long tons) standard
- Length: 66.8 m (219 ft 2 in)
- Beam: 11 m (36 ft 1 in)
- Draft: 2.7 m (8 ft 10 in)
- Depth: 5.2 m (17 ft 1 in)
- Propulsion: 2 × diesel electric engines; 2 × shafts
- Speed: 14 knots (26 km/h; 16 mph)
- Complement: 54
- Sensors & processing systems: OPS-39H surface-search radar; OQQ-10-1 sonar; ZQS-4 sonar; OZZ-2 UUV
- Armament: 1 × JM61R-MS 20 mm gun

The Awaji class is a class of minesweepers of the Japan Maritime Self-Defense Force (JMSDF).

== Development ==
The Awaji-class is the successor to the Yaeyama class. The hulls are constructed of fiber-reinforced plastic (FRP) along the lines of the Enoshima class. Since many naval mines are of the magnetic type, it was necessary to avoid the use of metal in the hull of minesweepers that dispose of that type, and, previously, most minesweepers were constructed of wood. By making the Awaji-class FRP, the standard displacement of the ships is reduced by 30%, and the life of the hulls are extended, although - it has almost the same dimensions as the previous wooden Yaeyama-class. In the image diagram of the budget request for the 2013 government budget, stealth was improved, but, in the budget request for the following year, the Enoshima-class was enlarged.

This class of ships is one of the largest FRP ships in the world. Japan Marine United (JMU), which possesses the construction technology and equipment for large FRP vessels, handed over the third ship Etajima to the Maritime Self-Defense Force on 16 March 2021. The Ministry of Defense and the Maritime Self-Defense Force budgeted 12.6 Billion yen for the construction of the fourth Awaji-class ship, following Etajima, in the 2020 budget.

== Ships in the class ==
Pennant no.	Name	Builders	Laid down	Launched	Commissioned	Home port
MSO-304	Awaji	Japan Marine United, Yokohama	27 February 2014	27 October 2015	16 March 2017	Yokosuka
MSO-305	Hirado	Japan Marine United, Yokohama	10 April 2015	10 February 2017	16 March 2018	Yokosuka
MSO-306	Etajima	Japan Marine United, Yokohama	22 February 2018	12 December 2019	16 March 2021	Kure
MSO-307	Nōmi	Japan Marine United, Yokohama	19 May 2021	24 October 2023	12 March 2025	Kure
MSO-	Kerama	Japan Marine United, Yokohama	2023	18 December 2025	2026 (scheduled)	
MSO-	06MOS	Japan Marine United, Yokohama	2025			
MSO-	TBA					
MSO-	TBA					
MSO-	TBA					
