= JS Hirado =

Awaji-class minesweeper of JMSDF

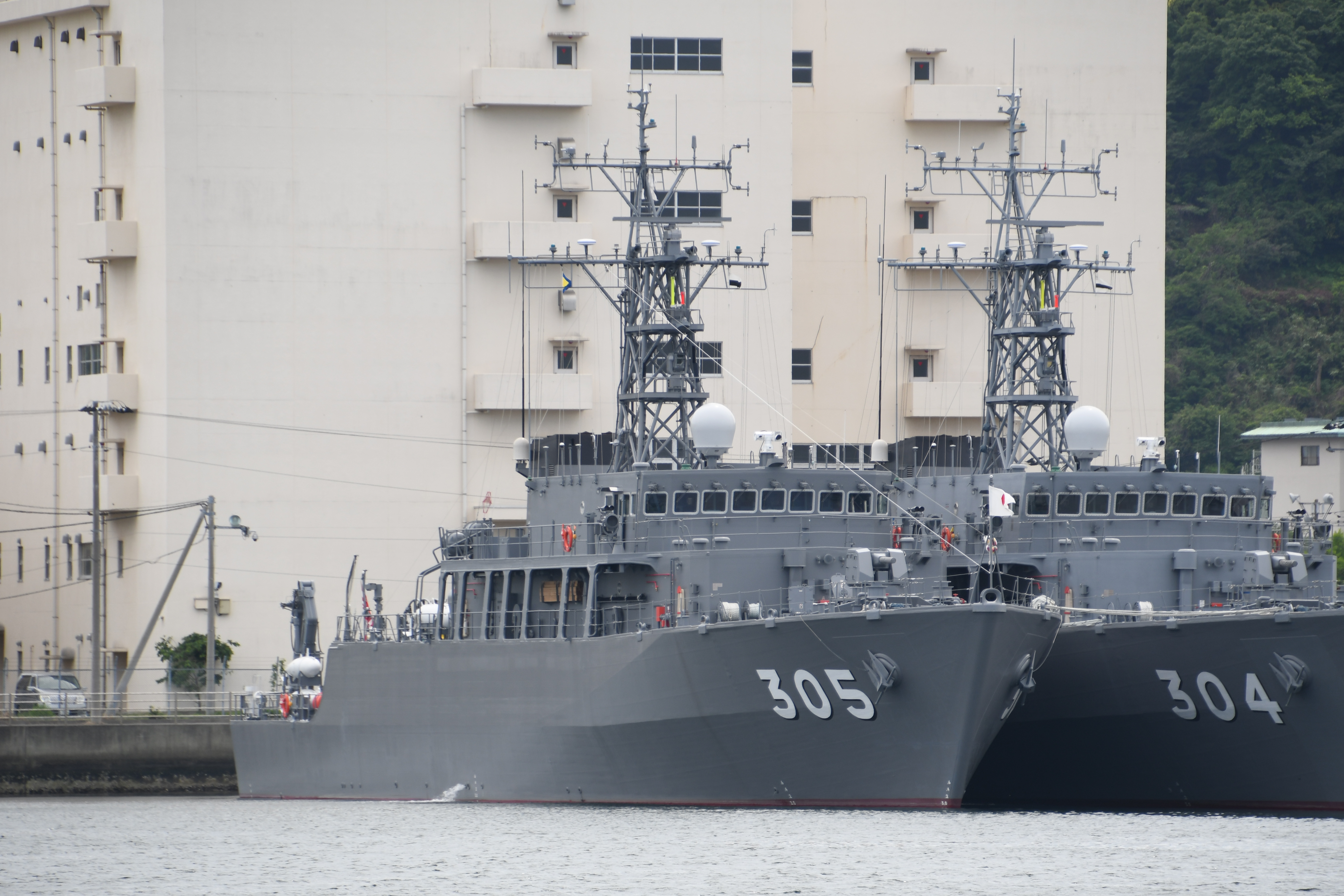
- JS Hirado and JS Awaji on 30 April 2018

History

Japan
- Name: Hirado; (ひらど)
- Namesake: Hirado
- Ordered: 2014
- Builder: JMU, Yokohama
- Laid down: 10 April 2015
- Launched: 10 February 2017
- Commissioned: 16 March 2018
- Home port: Yokosuka
- Identification: Pennant number: MSO-305
- Status: Active

General characteristics
- Class & type: Awaji-class minesweeper
- Displacement: 690 t (680 long tons) standard
- Length: 66.8 m (219 ft 2 in)
- Beam: 11 m (36 ft 1 in)
- Draft: 2.7 m (8 ft 10 in)
- Depth: 5.2 m (17 ft 1 in)
- Propulsion: 2 × diesel electric engines; 2 × shafts
- Speed: 14 kn (26 km/h; 16 mph)
- Complement: 54
- Sensors & processing systems: OPS-39H surface-search radar; OQQ-10-1 sonar; ZQS-4 sonar; OZZ-2 UUV
- Armament: 1 × single JM61R-MS 20mm gun

JS Hirado (MSO-305) is the second ship of the Awaji-class minesweepers of the Japan Maritime Self-Defense Force (JMSDF).

== Construction and career ==
Hirado was laid down on 10 April 2015 and launched on 10 February 2017 by Japan Marine United (JMU) Yokohama Shipyard. She was commissioned on 16 March 2018, and she was then incorporated into the 1st Mine Warfare Group and deployed to Yokosuka.

From July 18 to July 30, 2018, she conducted mine warfare training and some Japan-US-India joint minesweeping special training in Mutsu Bay.

== Gallery ==
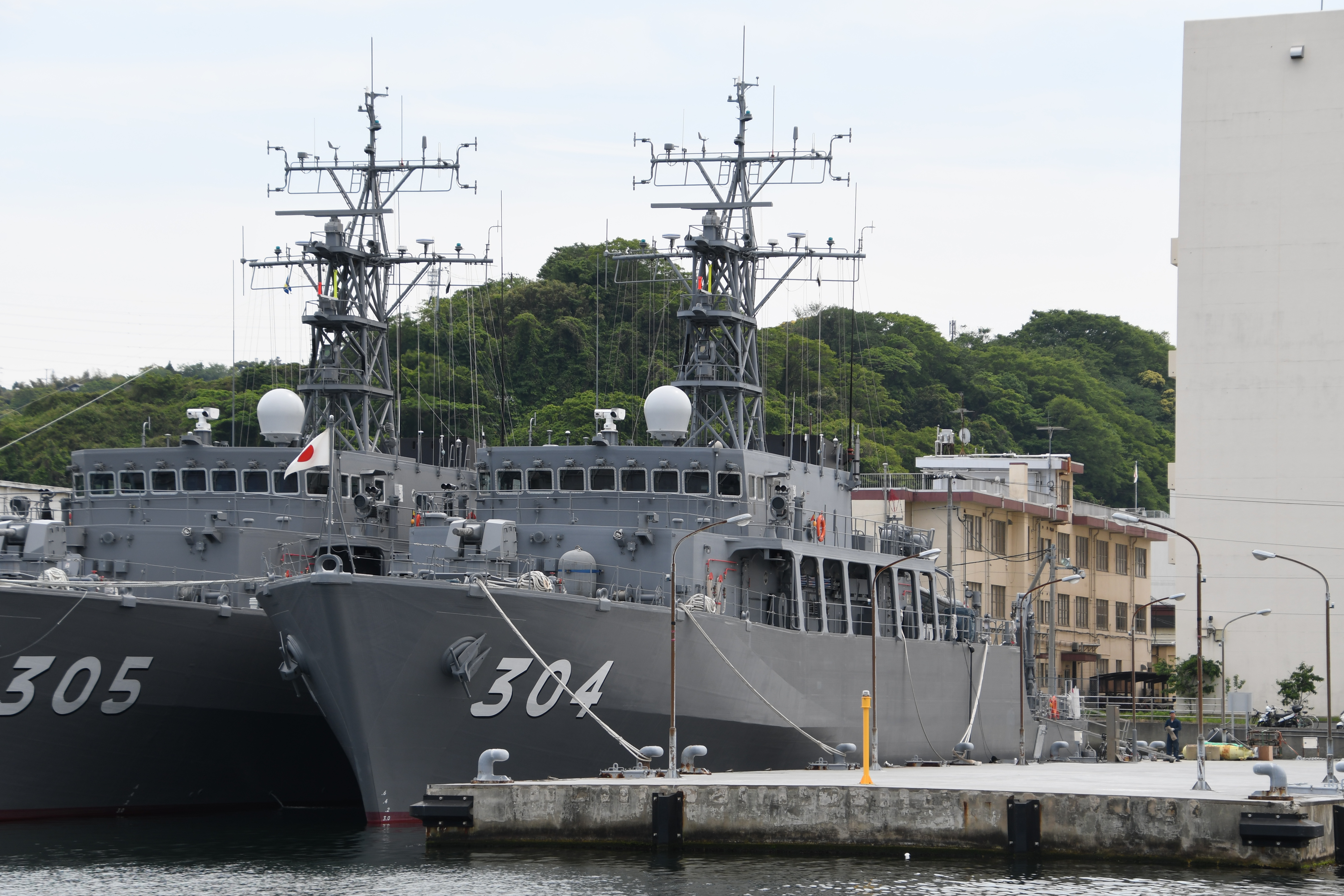
JS Awaji and JS Awaji on 30 April 2018

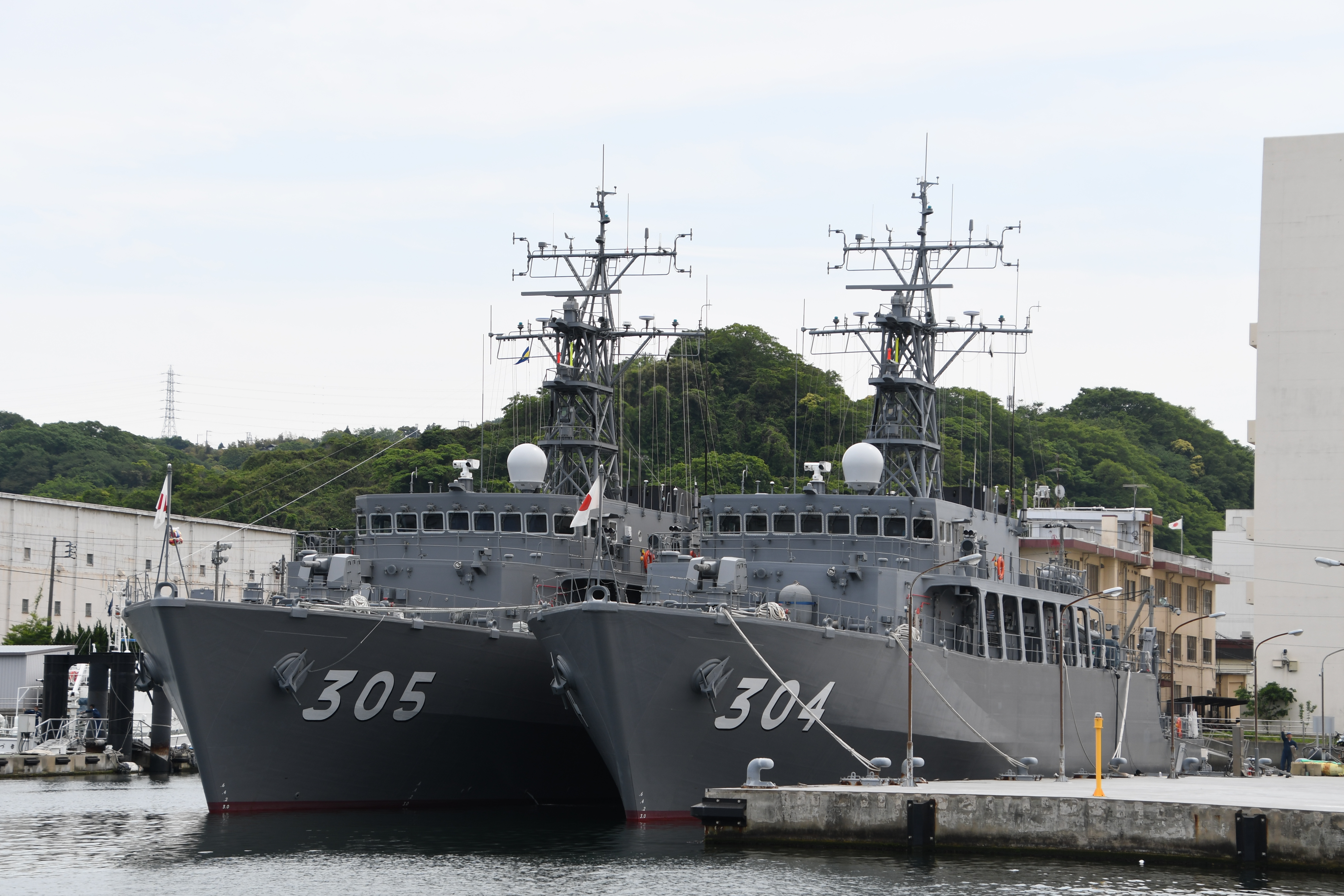

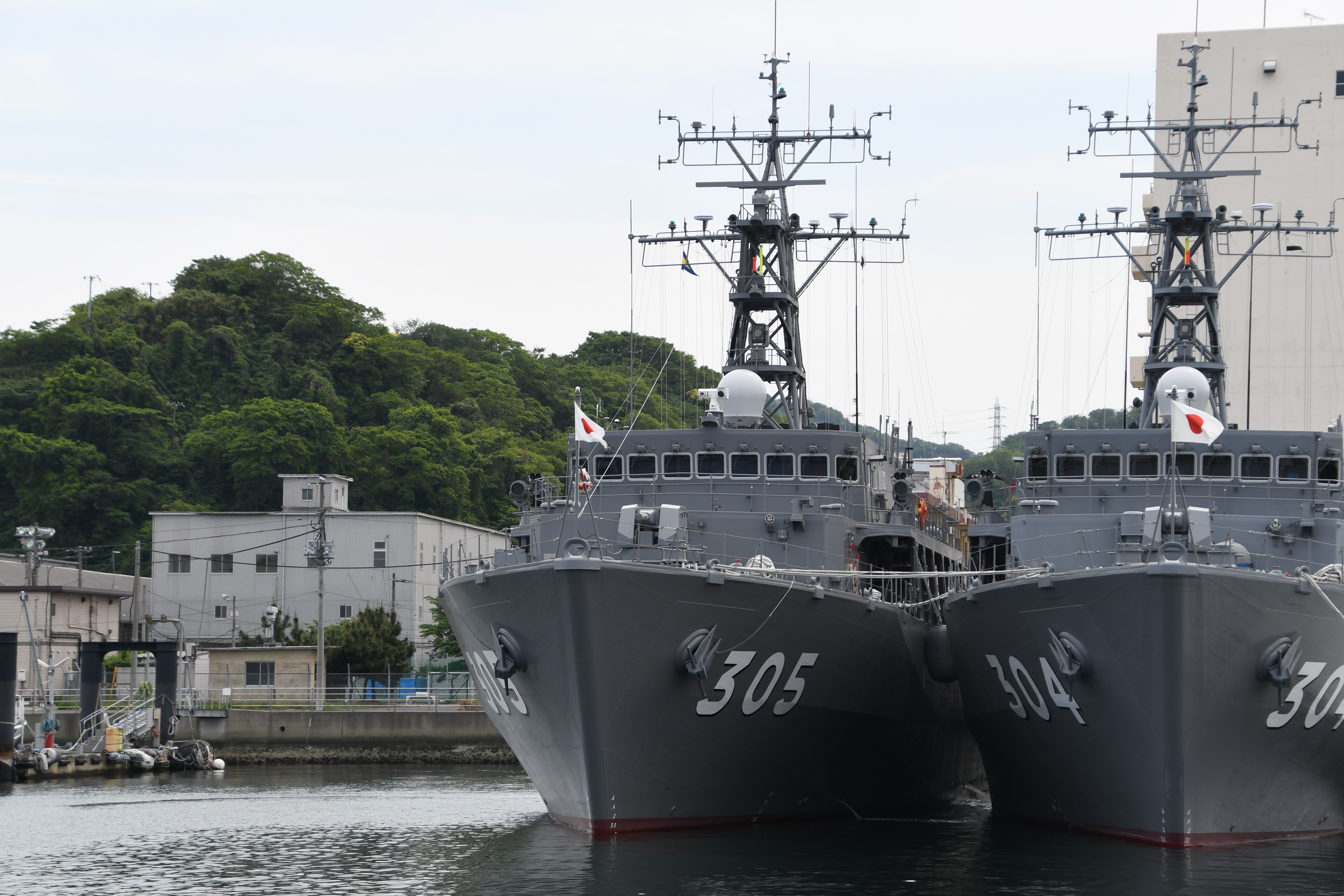

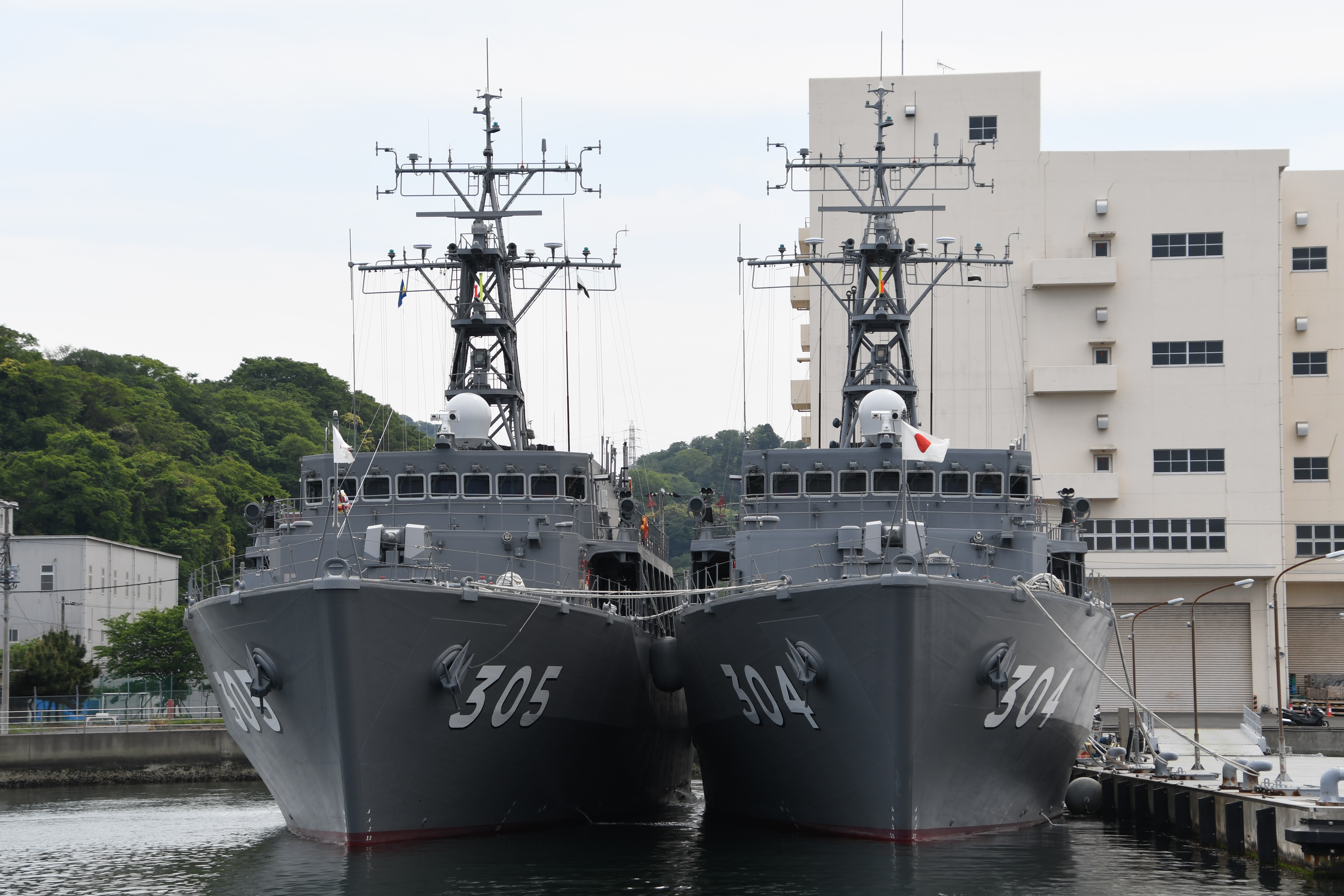

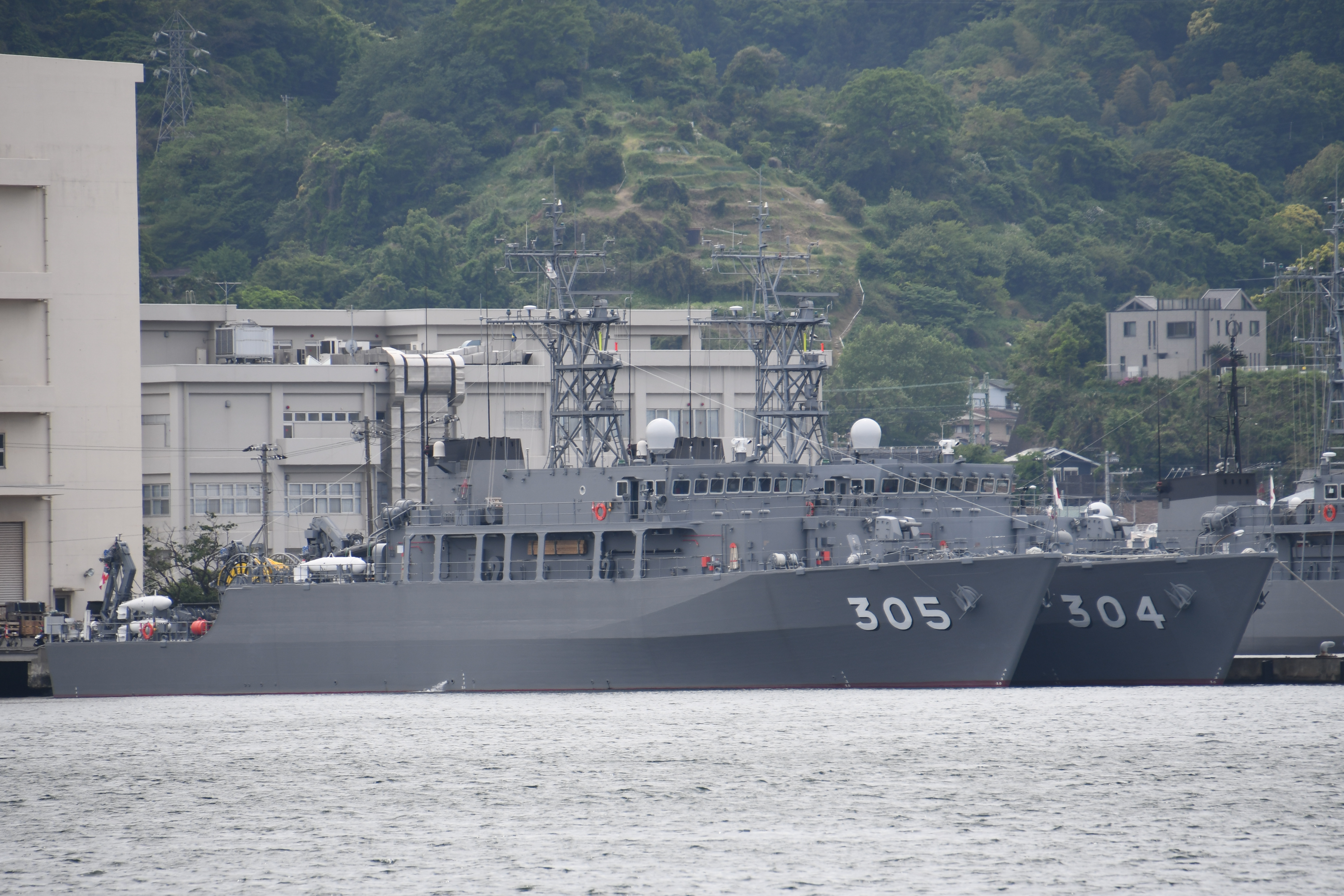

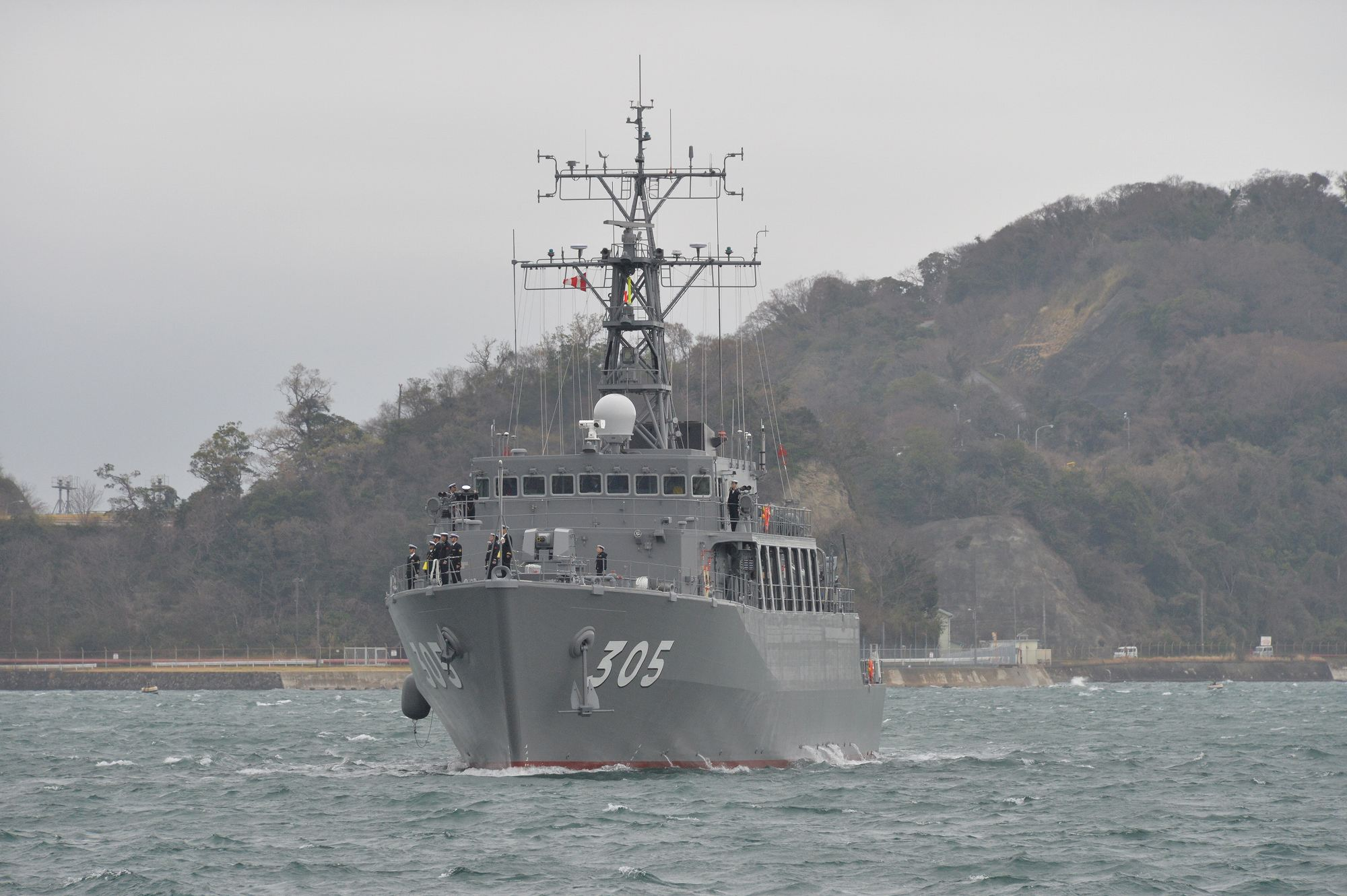
JS Hirado underway on 16 September 2019
