= JDS Tsugaru =

Cable laying ship of Japan

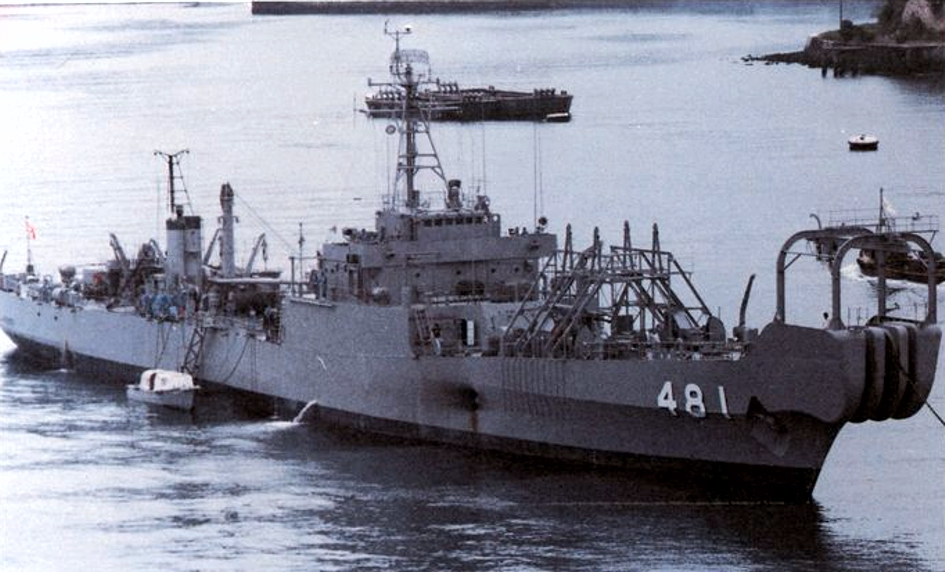
- JDS Tsugaru in the 1980s

History

Japan
- Name: Tsugaru; (つがる)
- Namesake: Tsugaru
- Ordered: 1953
- Builder: Mitsubishi, Tokyo
- Laid down: 18 December 1954
- Launched: 19 July 1955
- Commissioned: 15 December 1955
- Decommissioned: 15 March 1990
- Reclassified: ASU-7001, 1980
- Home port: Kure
- Identification: Pennant number: ARC-481
- Fate: Sunk as target

Class overview
- Succeeded by: Muroto class (1979)

General characteristics
- Type: Cable layer
- Displacement: 926 long tons (941 t), standard; Later 2,150 long tons (2,180 t); 1,400 long tons (1,400 t), maximum; Later 2,600 long tons (2,600 t)
- Length: 72 m (236 ft 3 in); Later 103 m (337 ft 11 in)
- Beam: 10.4 m (34 ft 1 in); Later 12.4 m (40 ft 8 in)
- Draft: 3.37 m (11 ft 1 in); Later 4.9 m (16 ft 1 in)
- Depth: 5.6 m (18 ft 4 in); Later 8 m (26 ft 3 in)
- Propulsion: 2 × Harima Sulzer diesel engines; 2 × shafts
- Speed: 13 knots (24 km/h; 15 mph)
- Complement: 100–103
- Sensors & processing systems: 1 × SPS-5 radar; Mk.51 Fire control system; Sonar
- Armament: 2 × Mk.10 20 mm guns; 4 × K-guns; 1 × Depth charge drop rail; 2 × Minelaying rails
- Aviation facilities: Helipad

JDS Tsugaru (ARC-481) was a cable laying ship of the Japanese Maritime Self-Defense Force.

== Development and design ==
The ship was designed by requesting the Ship Design Association, which consists of former Navy engineers, with reference to the Hatsushima class cable laying boat of the Imperial Japanese Navy. Its main task was to lay an underwater hearing monitoring device in the waters around the base and harbor, and due to its characteristics, there were many secrets and it was called a supply repair ship at the beginning of construction.

The structure of the ship was equipped with a sheave for laying submarine cables on the bow, a large cable drum under the bridge, two electric wire storages in the center, and a 5-ton derrick. Other than that, it was equipped with minelaying equipment and anti-submarine warfare equipment including sonar, but this equipment were the result required of the comprehensive design policy and were not very meaningful in operation.

== Construction and career ==
Tsugaru was laid down on 18 December 1954 and launched on 19 July 1955 at Mitsubishi Heavy Industries Shipyard in Tokyo. She commissioned on 15 December 1955. The vessel transferred to the Yokosuka District Force on 1 September 1957. On 1 September 1961, the 2nd Mine Warfare Force was newly formed and incorporated Tsugaru under direct control.

Equipped with a precision sounding instrument for the deep sea in 1967, a special remodeling was carried out by Tsugaru at the Mitsubishi Heavy Industries Yokohama Shipyard from 10 July 1969 to 20 April 1970. Weapons except the 20 mm gun were removed and new underwater equipment laying equipment was added. Due to this modification, the bow and bridge were greatly changed, and the displacement was more than double that of at the time of construction.

At 0:42 am on 21 August 1972, Tsugaru collided with the small cargo ship Daini Tenjinmaru in the Akashi Strait. The left part of the bow of Tsugaru collided with the center of the starboard side of Daini Tenjinmaru. The cargo ship sank, and two of the three crew members were rescued by Tsugaru, but one went missing. In addition, the damage to Tsugaru was only a dent on the bow.

On 12 January 1977, the laying ship (ARC) was categorized from a mine ship to a special service ship. On 17 March 1980, due to aging, the vessel's type was changed from a laying ship to a special service ship, the ship registration number was changed to ASU-7001, and it was reorganized into the Oceanographic Command.

Tsugaru was removed from the register on 15 March 1990. The following year, in April 1991, equipment was removed and the ship was remodeled into a target ship by installing a heating plate. In April 1992, Tsugaru was circulated to Wakasa Bay, used as a target, and disposed of.
