= Japanese ship Haguro =

At least two warships of Japan have borne the name Haguro:

- Japanese cruiser Haguro, was a Myōkō-class cruiser launched in 1928 and sunk in 1945
- JS Haguro, is a Maya-class destroyer launched in 2019
