= List of destroyer classes in service =

The list of destroyer classes in service includes all those currently with navies or armed forces and auxiliaries in the world. Ships are grouped by type, and listed alphabetically within.

== Type 051B destroyer (NATO codename Luhai) ==
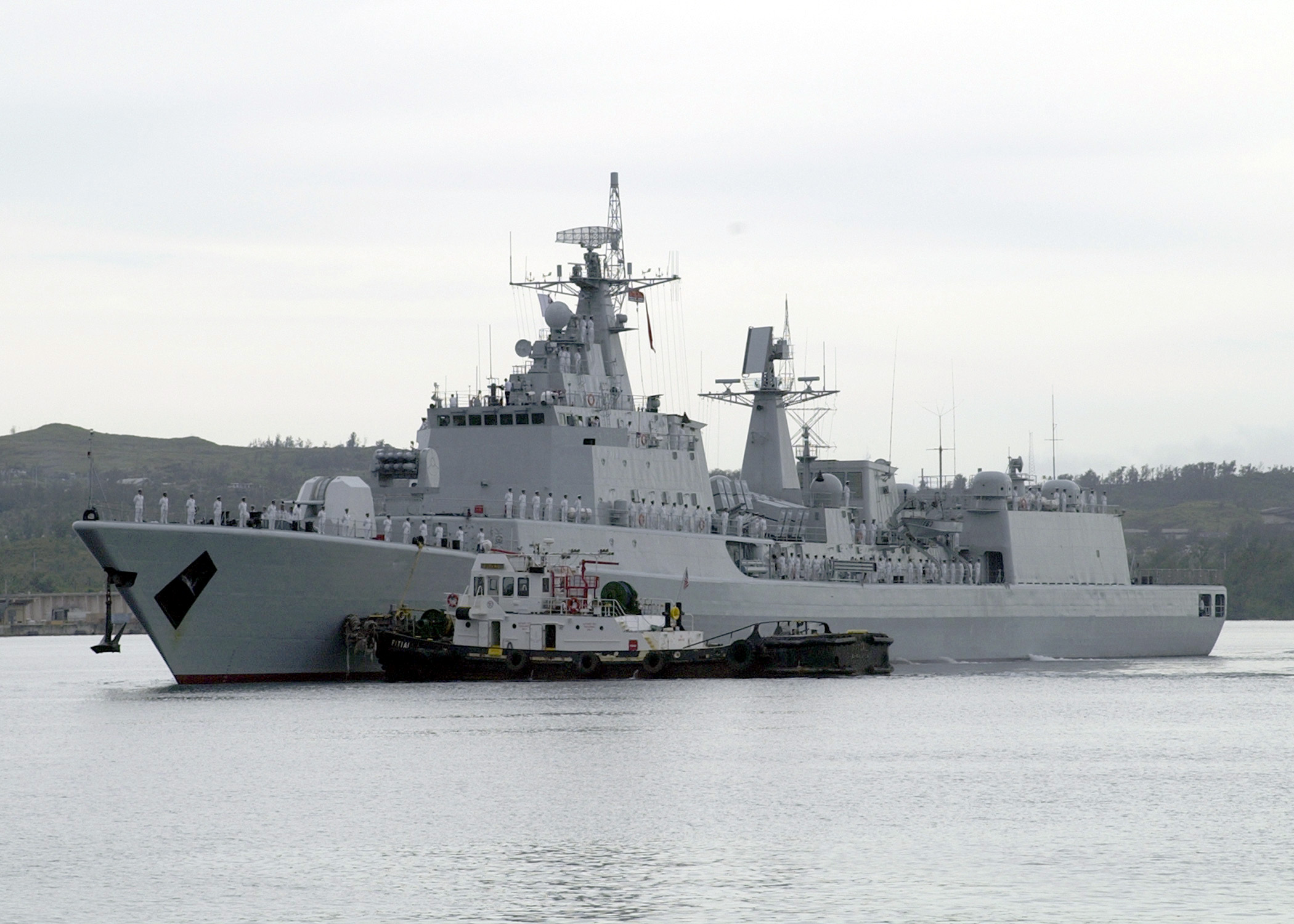
Shenzhen

- Builders: China (Dalian Shipyard in Dalian)
- Type: Multi-role guided-missile destroyer
- Displacement: 6,100 tons
- Aircraft: 1 × Z-9C Haitun helicopter
- Armament: After refit: 16 × YJ-12 SSM; 32-cell H/AJK16 VLS HQ-16; 1 × dual Type 79A 100 mm naval gun; 2 × Type 1130 CIWS
- Powerplant: 2 × steam turbines; 48,600 shp (36.2 MW) total power
- Speed: 31 knots (57 km/h)
- Range: 13,000 nmi (24,000 km) at 14 knots (26 km/h)
- Ships in class: 1
- Operator: People's Liberation Army Navy
- Commissioned: 1999
- Status: in active service

== Type 051C destroyer (NATO codename Luzhou) ==
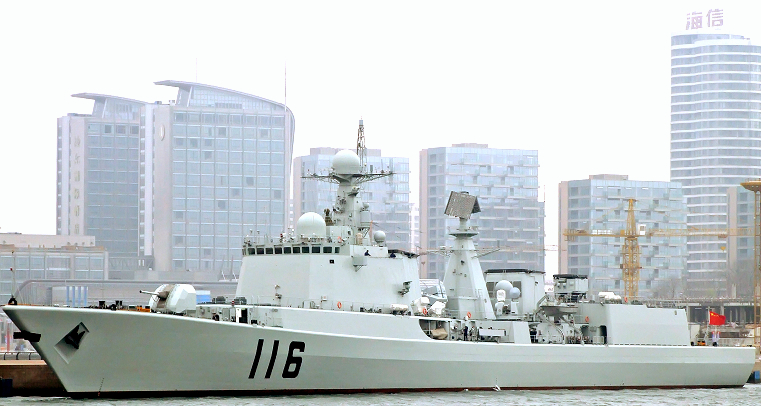
Shijiazhuang

- Builders: China (Dalian Shipyard in Dalian)
- Type: Air defense guided-missile destroyer
- Displacement: 7,100 tons
- Aircraft: 1 Kamov Ka-28 helicopter
- Armament: 8 YJ-83, 48 vertically launched S-300FM (SA-N-20) SAM, 1 × 100 mm gun; 2 × 30 mm Type 730 CIWS; 4 × 18 barrel multiple rocket launcher, 2 triple 324 mm ASW torpedo tubes
- Powerplant: 2 indigenous steam turbines
- Speed: 30 knots
- Ships in class: 2
- Operator: People's Liberation Army Navy
- Commissioned: 2006
- Status: In active service

== Type 052 destroyer (NATO codename Luhu) ==
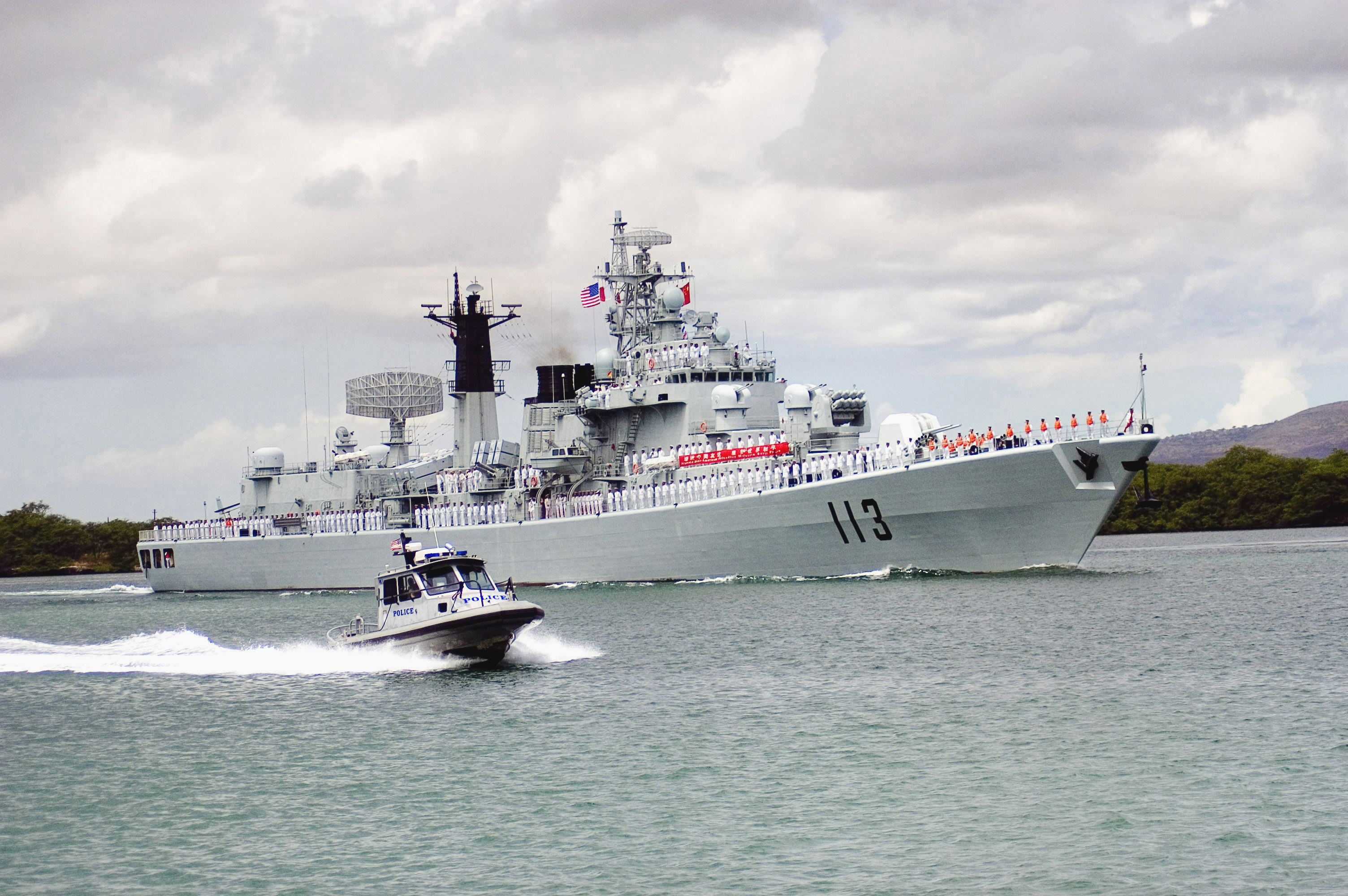
Qingdao

- Builders: China (Jiangnan Shipyard in Shanghai)
- Type: Multi-role guided-missile destroyer
- Displacement: 4,800 tons
- Aircraft: 2 × Z-9 Haitun helicopters
- Armament: 16 × C-802 SSM; 8 × HQ-7 SAM + reloads; 1 × dual-100 mm gun; 2 × 30mm Type 730 CIWS (after 2011 refit); 6 × 533 mm torpedo tubes
- Powerplant: CODOG arrangement; 2 MTU diesels plus 2 LM2500 gas turbines; 2 shafts; 53,600 shp total power
- Speed: 30 knots
- Range: 5,000 nmi at 15 knots
- Ships in class: 2
- Operator: People's Liberation Army Navy
- Commissioned: 1993
- Status: In active service

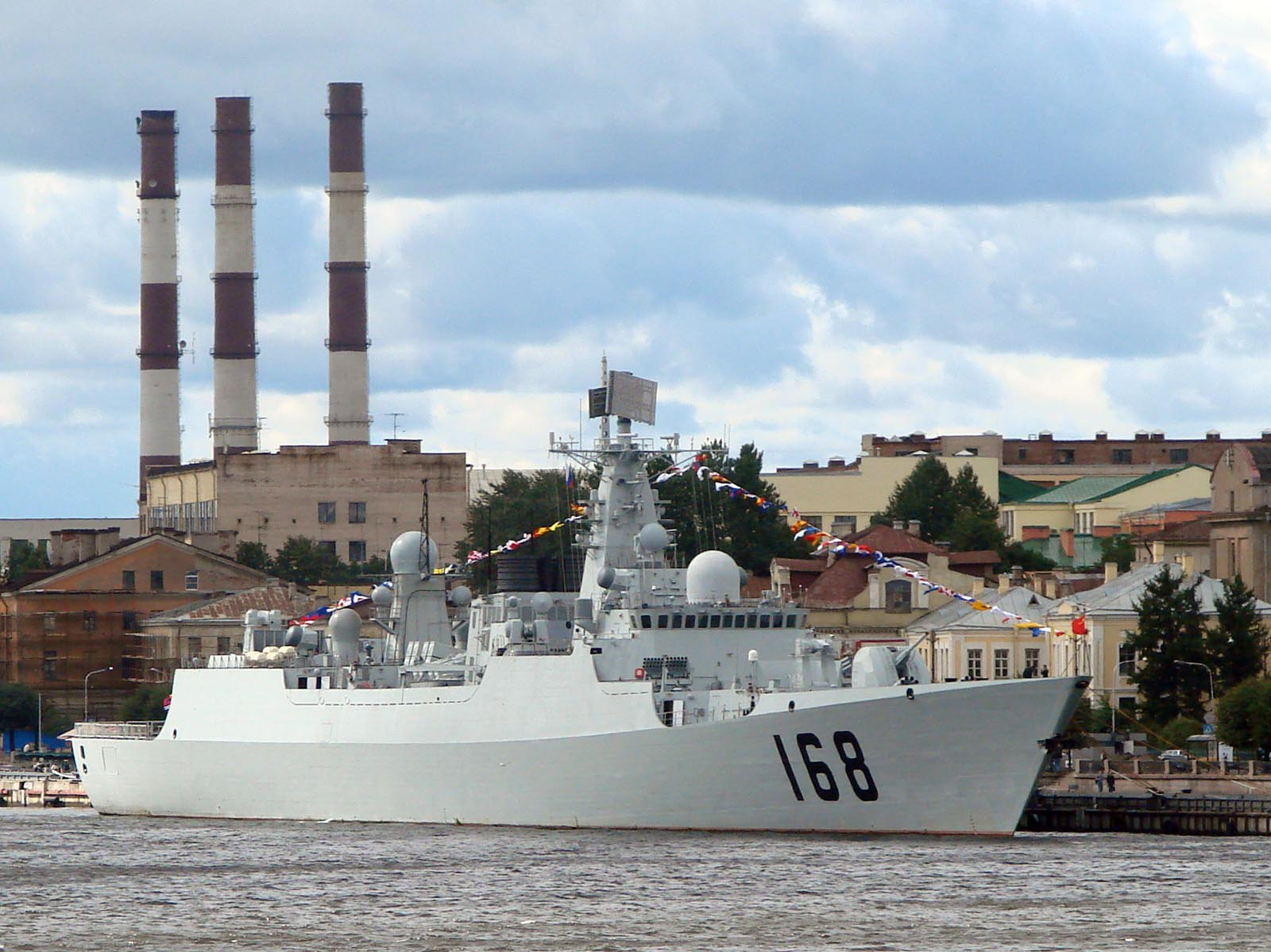
Guangzhou

Type 052B destroyer (NATO codename Luyang I)

- Builders: China (Jiangnan Shipyard in Shanghai)
- Type: Multi-role guided-missile destroyer
- Displacement: 6,200 tons
- Aircraft: 1 Kamov Ka-28 helicopter
- Armament: 16 × YJ-83 SSM, 48 × SA-N-12 SAM, 1 × 100 mm gun, 2 × 30 mm Type 730 CIWS, 2 × Triple 324 mm ASW torpedo tubes, 2 × Type 75, 12-barrel 240 mm antisubmarine rocket launchers, 4 × 18-barrel multiple rocket launcher
- Powerplant: 2 Ukraine DN80 gas-turbines and 2 MTU Friedrichshafen 12V 1163TB83 diesels
- Speed: 30 knots
- Ships in class: 2
- Operator: People's Liberation Army Navy
- Commissioned: July 2004
- Status: In active service

== Type 052C destroyer (NATO codename Luyang II) ==
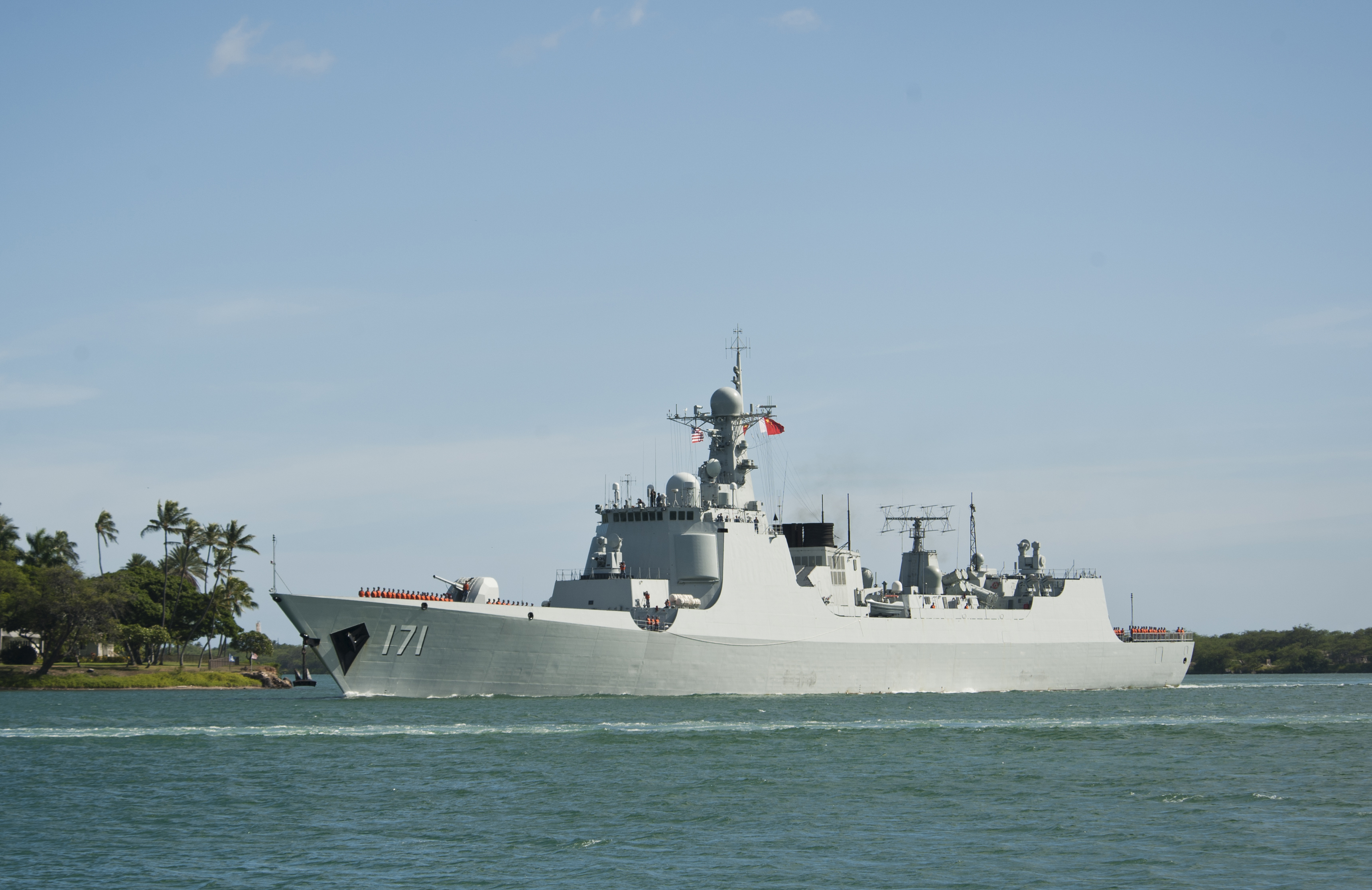
Lanzhou

- Builders: China (Jiangnan Shipyard in Shanghai)
- Type: Air defense guided-missile destroyer
- Displacement: 7,000 tons
- Aircraft: 1 -2 Kamov Ka-28 helicopter
- Armament: 8 × large Anti-ship missile in 2 × quad cells, possibly YJ-62 (C-602), 48 × vertically launched HHQ-9 SAM, 1 × 100 mm gun; 2 × 30 mm Type 730 CIWS; 4 × 18 barrel Multiple rocket launcher, 2 × triple 324 mm ASW torpedo tubes
- Powerplant: 2 Ukraine DN80 gas-turbines and 2 MTU Friedrichshafen 12V 1163TB83 diesels
- Speed: 30 knots
- Ships in class: 6
- Operator: People's Liberation Army Navy
- Commissioned: July 2004
- Status: In active service

== Type 052D destroyer (NATO codename Luyang III) ==
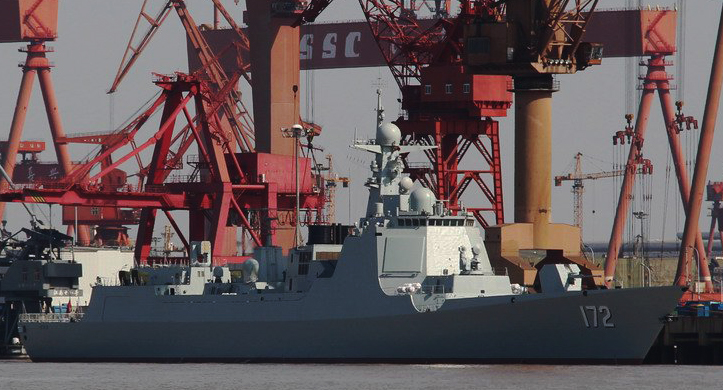
Kunming

- Builders: China (Jiangnan Shipyard in Shanghai)
- Type: Air defense guided-missile destroyer
- Displacement: 7,500 tons
- Aircraft: 1 -2 Kamov Ka-28 helicopter
- Armament: Anti-ship missiles, 64 × vertically launched SAM, 1 × 130 mm gun; 1 × Type 730 CIWS; 2 × triple ASW torpedo tubes
- Powerplant: 2 gas-turbines and 2 MTU diesel engines
- Speed: 30 knots
- Ships in class: 35 in service
- Operator: People's Liberation Army Navy
- Commissioned: March 2014
- Status: 35 in active service

== Type 055 destroyer (NATO codename Renhai) ==
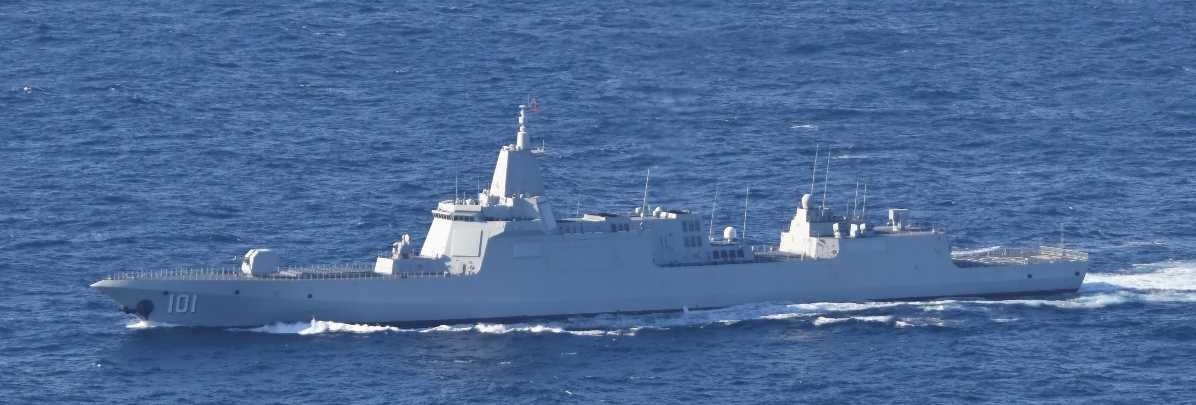
Nanchang

- Builders: China (Jiangnan Shipyard in Shanghai, Dalian Shipyard in Dalian)
- Type: Guided-missile destroyer
- Displacement: 12–13,000 tons
- Aircraft: 2 medium-lift helicopters
- Armament: 1 × H/PJ-38 130 mm gun; 1 × H/PJ-11 CIWS; 1 × HHQ-10 short-range SAM 24-cell launcher; 112 VLS cells for: HHQ-9 surface-to-air missiles, YJ-18 anti-ship cruise missiles, CJ-10 land-attack cruise missiles, Missile-launched anti-submarine torpedoes; 2 × sets of 324 mm torpedo tubes, Yu-7 torpedoes
- Powerplant: 6 × QD-50 turbine generators (5 MW (6,700 hp) each)
- Speed: 30 knots
- Ships in class: 10 in service; a total of 16 are planned
- Operator: People's Liberation Army Navy
- Commissioned: January 2020
- Status: 8 in active service

== Akizuki-class destroyer ==
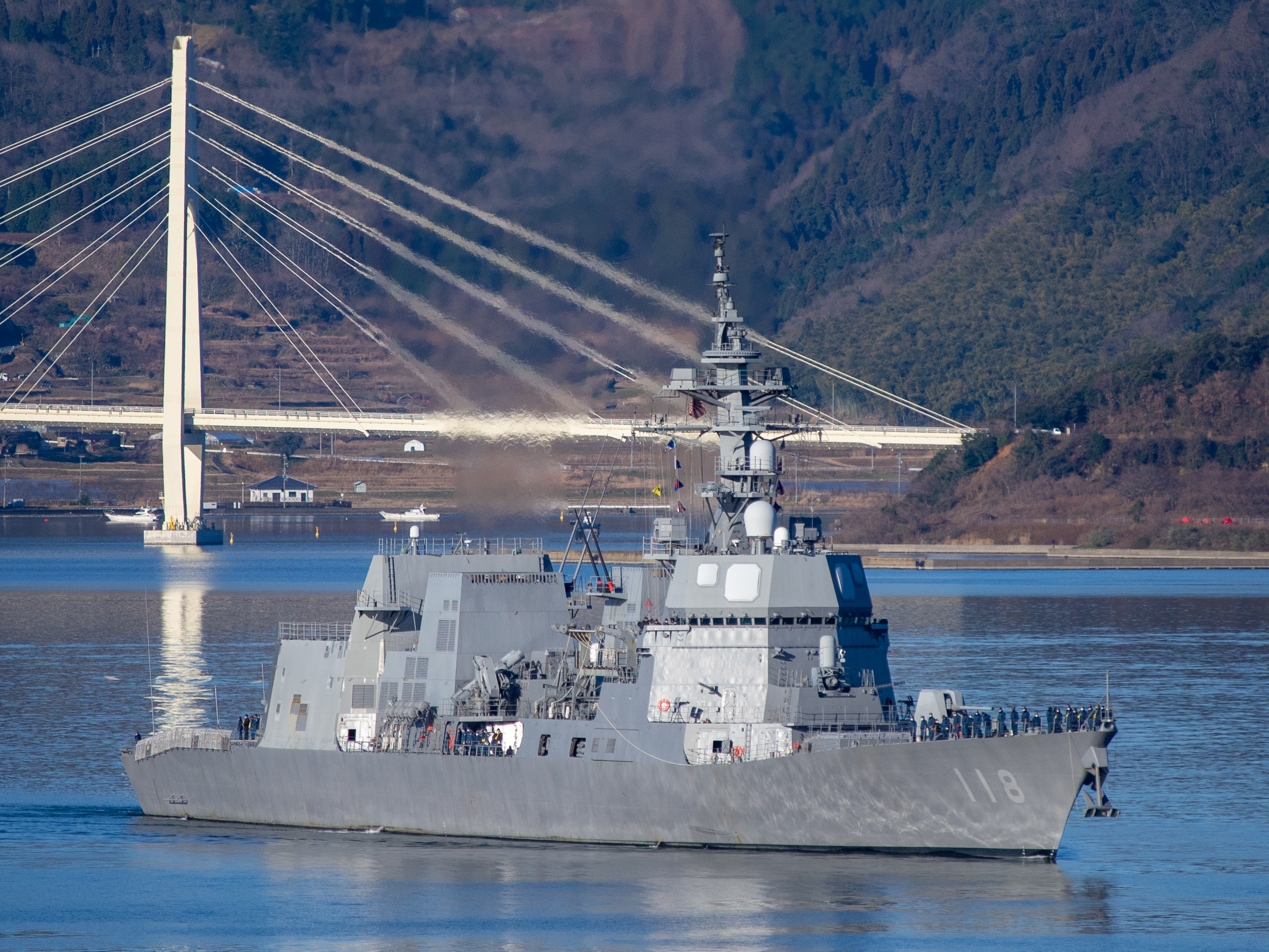
Fuyuzuki

- Type: Guided-missile destroyer
- Builder: Japan
- Displacement: 5,000 tons (empty); 6,800 tons (full load)
- Operator: Japan Maritime Self-Defense Force: 4 in service

== Almirante Brown-class destroyer (MEKO 360H2 type) ==
- Builder: Germany
- Displacement: 2,900 tons (empty); 3,360 tons (full load)
- Operator: Argentine Navy: 3 in service

== Arleigh Burke-class destroyer ==
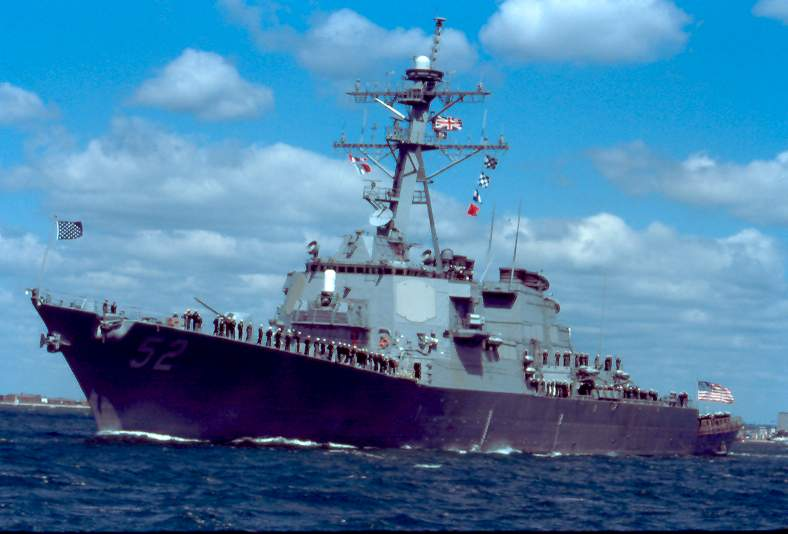
Barry

- Type: Large multi-role guided-missile destroyer
- Builder: United States (Bath Iron Works in Bath, Maine, and Northrop Grumman Ship Systems in Pascagoula, Mississippi)
- Displacement:
  - Flight I: 8,315 tons
  - Flight II: 8,400 tons
  - Flight IIA: 9,500 tons
  - Flight III: 9,700 tons
- Aircraft: 2 SH-60 Seahawk helicopters (Flight IIA only)
- Armament: 96 cell vertical launch system for SM-2, SM-3, SM-6, quad-packed ESSM, Tomahawk, or VL-Asroc; 1 × 5-inch DP gun; 6 × Mk 46 torpedo tubes
- Propulsion: 4 × LM2500 gas turbines (100,000 shp)
- Speed: 30 knots (56 km/h)
- Ships in class: 70
  - 21 Flight I
  - 7 Flight II
  - 2 Flight IIA (with 5"/54 gun)
  - 4 Flight IIA (with 5"/62 guns)
  - 28 Flight IIA (with 5"/62 guns), one 20mm CIWS variant
  - 2 Flight IIA Restart (1 additional Ships planned)
  - Flight IIA Technology Insertion (10 planned)
  - Flight III (14 currently planned)
- Operator: United States Navy
- Commissioned: 4 July 1991
- Status: In active service

== Asagiri-class destroyer ==
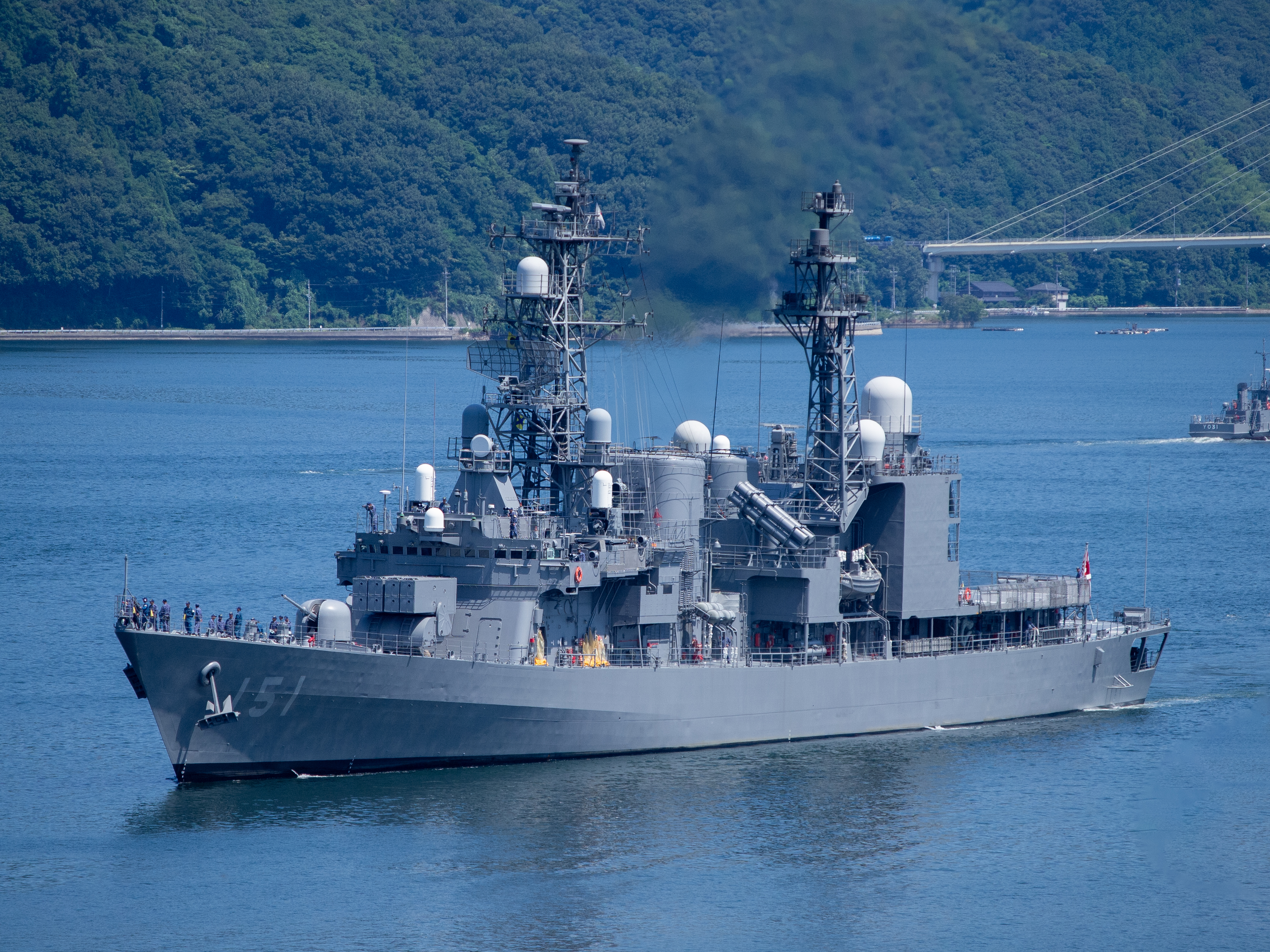
Asagiri(Low visibility paint)

- Type: Multi-role destroyer
- Builder: Japan (IHI in Tokyo and others)
- Displacement: 3,500 tons (empty); 5,200 tons (full load)
- Armament: RGM-84 Harpoon SSM, Sea Sparrow, ASROC anti-submarine rocket, 1 × 76 mm 62cal rapid fire gun (OTO Melara 3), 2 × 20mm CIWS, 2 × Type 68 triple torpedo tubes
- Propulsion: 4 gas turbines, two shafts (54,000 shaft horsepower)
- Speed: 30 knots (56 km/h)
- Ships in class: 8
- Operator: Japan Maritime Self-Defense Force
- Commissioned: 17 March 1988
- Status: In active service; 2 converted to training vessels

== Atago-class destroyer ==
- Builder: Japan (MHI)
- Type: Large guided-missile destroyer
- Displacement: 10,000 tons
- Armament: 1 × 5-inch (127 mm/L62) Mk 45 Mod 4 naval gun in a stealth-shaped mount. (Made by Japan Steel Works licensed from its original manufacturer); 2 × missile canister up to 8 Type 90 (SSM-1B); 2 × 20 mm Phalanx CIWS; 2 × Type 68 triple torpedo tubes (6 × Mk 46 or Type 73 torpedoes); 96-cell Mk 41 VLS: (64 at the bow / 32 cells at the stern aft) for a mix of: SM-2MR Standard missile, SM-3 anti-ballistic missile and RUM-139 vertical launch ASROC (anti-submarine)
- Powerplant: CODOG
- Speed: 30 knots
- Ships in class: 2
- Operator: Japan Maritime Self-Defense Force
- Commissioned: 15 March 2007
- Status: In active service

== Chungmugong Yi Sun-sin (KDX-II)-class destroyer ==
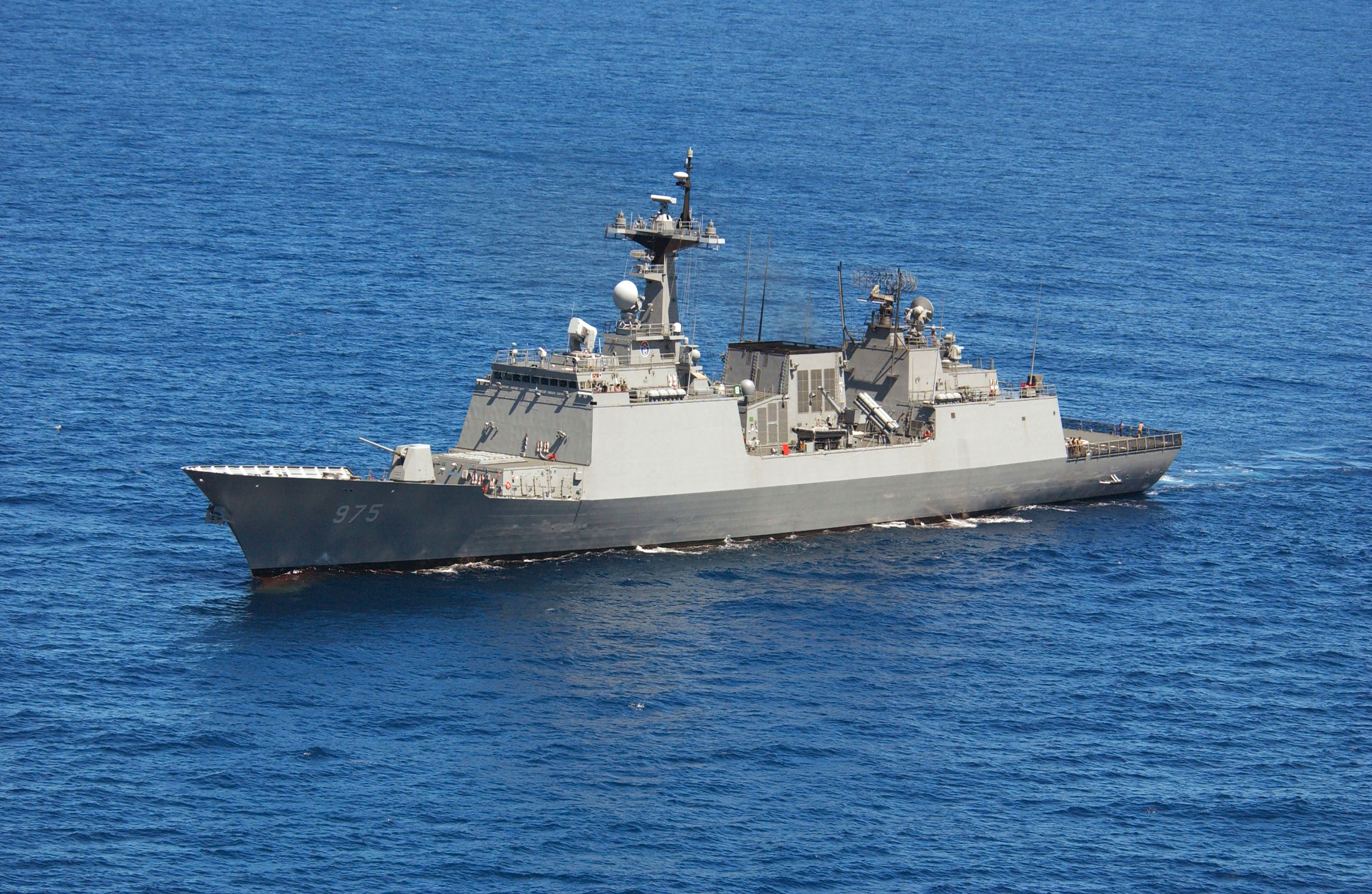
Chungmugong Yi Sun-sin

- Builders: South Korea
- Type: Guided-missile destroyer
- Displacement: 6,520 tons
- Armament: 1 32-cell Mk 41 VLS for SM-2 SM-2 Block IIIA SAM, 1 21-round RAM launcher, 1 30 mm Goalkeeper CIWS, 1 Mk 45 Mod4 127 mm gun, 8 Harpoon SSM, 2 triple 324 mm torpedo tubes
- Powerplant: CODOG 2 MTU 20V 956 TB 82 diesel, 2 LM2500 gas turbines, 2 shafts
- Speed: 30 knots
- Ships in class: 6
- Operator: Republic of Korea Navy
- Commissioned: December 2003
- Status: In active service

== Delhi-class destroyer ==
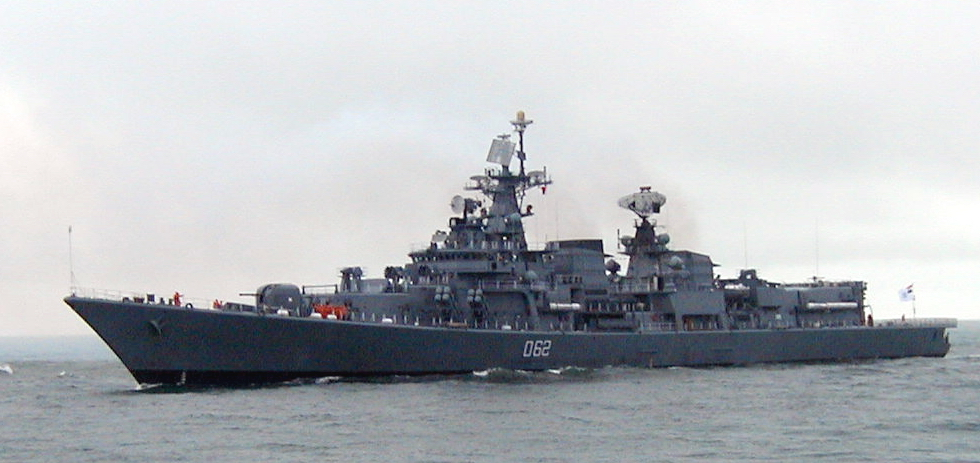
Mumbai

- Builders: India (Mazgaon Dockyard in Mumbai)
- Type: Guided-missile destroyer
- Displacement: 6,200 tons
- Aircraft: 2 Sea King helicopters
- Armament: 8 × BhraMos slant launchers; 2 × 3S-90 launchers fitted with Shtil SAM system; 1 × 100 mm AK-100; 4 × 30 mm AK-630; 5 × 533 mm PTA 533 quintuple torpedo tube launchers; 2 × RBU-6000 Anti-submarine rocket launchers
- Powerplant: 2 cruise diesels and 2 AM-50 boost gas turbines, 60,000 shp total power
- Speed: 32+ knots
- Ships in class: 3 total
- Operator: Indian Navy
- Commissioned: 15 November 1997
- Status: All in active service

== Durand de la Penne-class destroyer ==
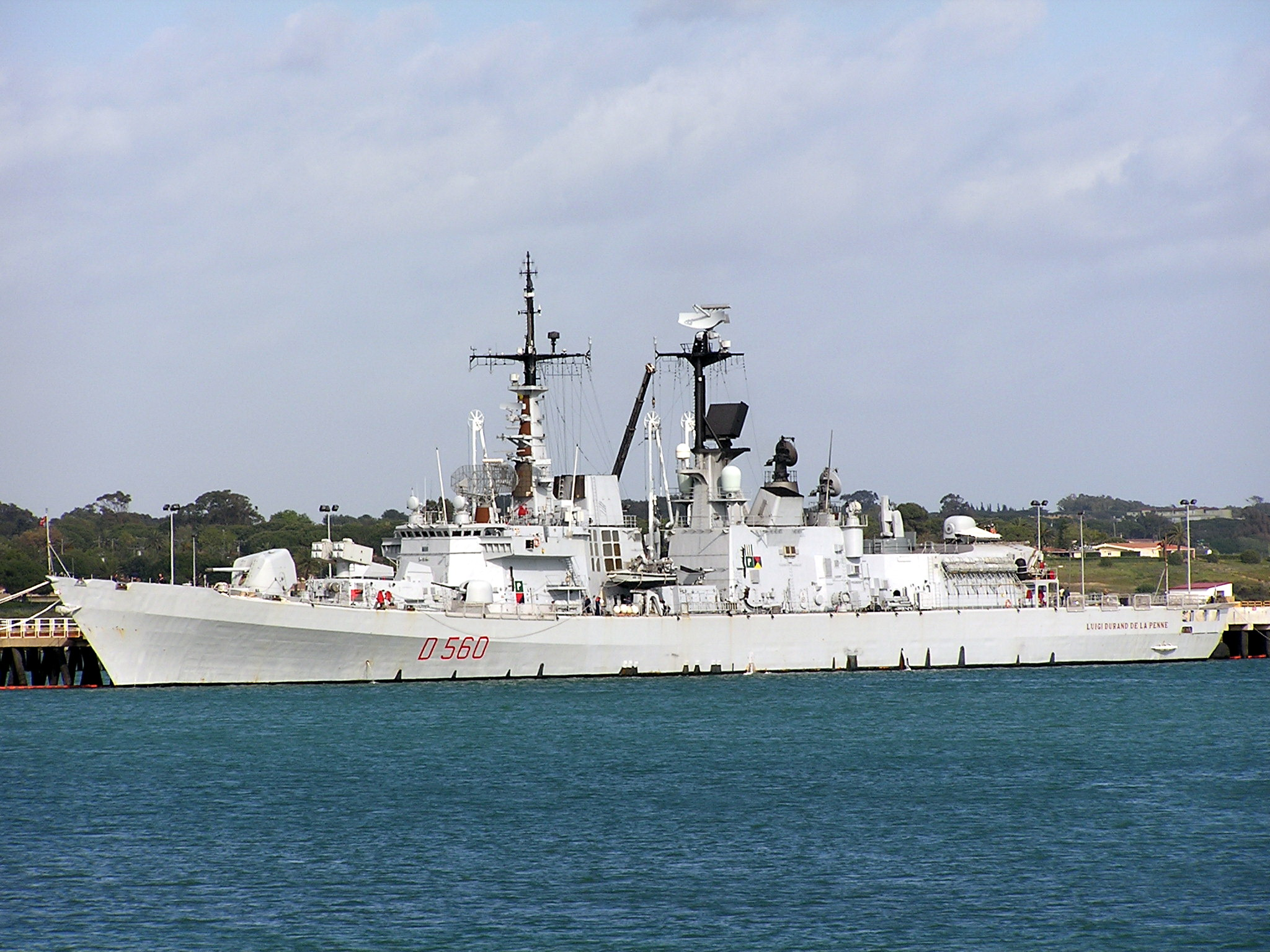
Durand de la Penne

- Builders: Italy
- Displacement: 5,560 tons
- Armament: 1 Standard SAM launcher, 1 octuple Aspide SAM missile launcher, 8 Otomat SSM, 1 127 mm gun, 3 Otobreda 76 mm guns, 6 324 mm torpedo tubes
- Powerplant: 2 LM-2500 gas turbines, 2 Diesels
- Speed: 31.5 knots
- Ships in class: 2
- Operator: Marina Militare
- Commissioned: 1993
- Status: In active service

== Gwanggaeto the Great (KDX-1 Okpo)-class destroyer ==
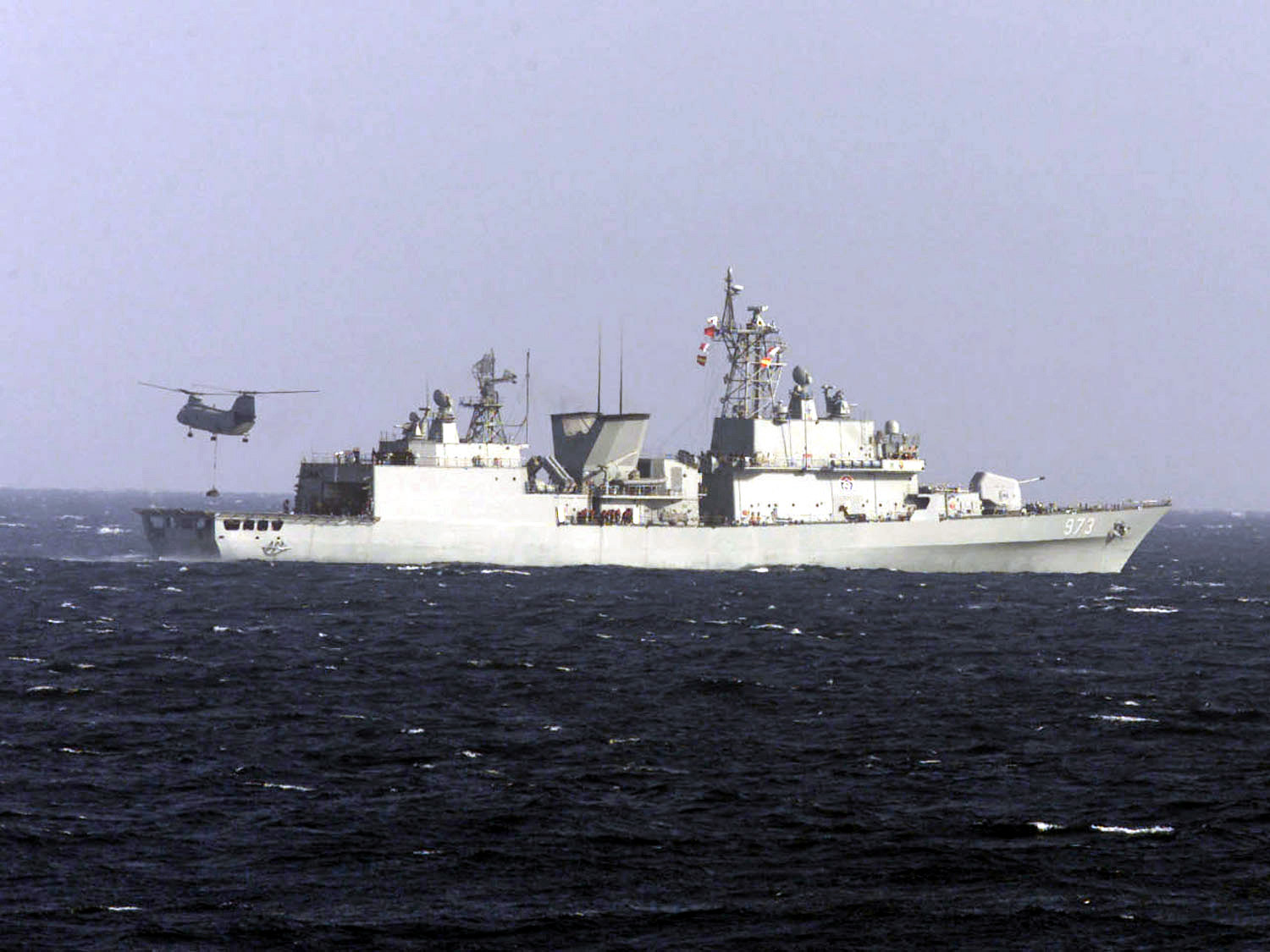
Yang Manchun

- Builders: South Korea (Daewoo in Geoje)
- Type: Destroyer
- Displacement: 3,900 tons
- Armament: 2 × quadruple Harpoon missile canisters, 1 × Mk 48 Mod 2 VLS with 16 Sea Sparrow missiles, 1 × OTO Melara 127 mm (5 in)/54 gun, 2 × Signaal 30 mm Goalkeeper CIWS, 2 × triple Mark 46 torpedo tubes
- Aircraft: 2 × Super Lynx helicopters
- Powerplant: 2 General Electric LM2500-30 gas turbines and 2 SsangYong 20V 956 TB 82 diesel engines; two shafts
- Speed: 30 knots
- Ships in class: 3
- Operator: Republic of Korea Navy
- Commissioned: 24 July 1998
- Status: In active service

== Hatakaze-class destroyer ==
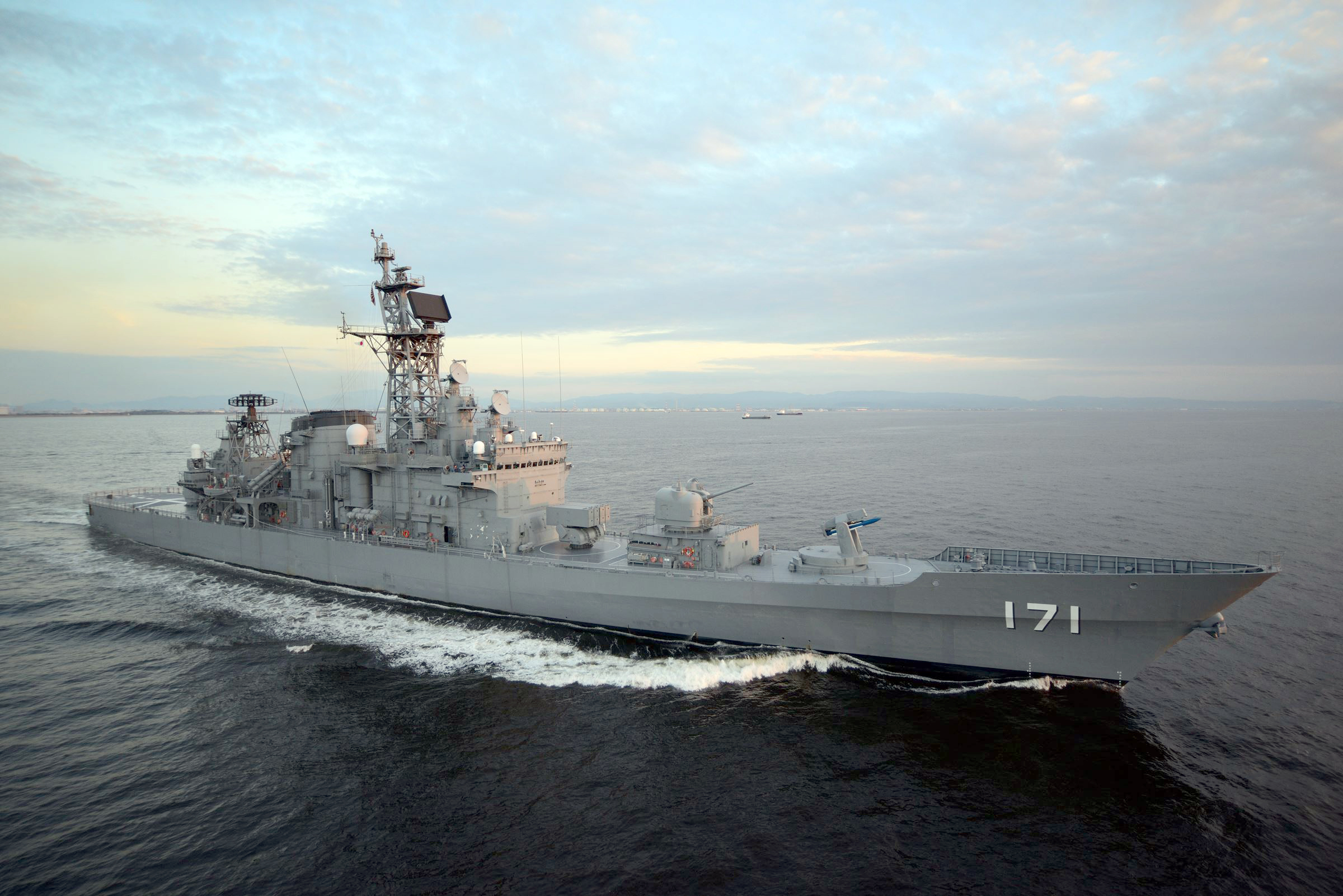
Hatakaze

- Builders: Japan (Mitsubishi in Nagasaki)
- Type: Guided-missile destroyer
- Displacement:
  - Hatakaze: 6,096 tons
  - Shimakaze: 6,147 tons
- Armament: RGM-84 Harpoon SSM, RIM-66B Standard SAM, ASROC anti-submarine rocket, 2 × 5-inch 54cal rapid fire gun (Mk 42), 2 × 20 mm CIWS, 2 × Type 68 triple torpedo tubes
- Powerplant: 4 gas turbines (2 × Kawasaki Rolls-Royce Spey SM1A for cruising) (2 × Olympus TM3B x2 for high speed only); two shafts (72,000 shaft horsepower)
- Speed: 30 knots
- Ships in class: 2
- Operator: Japan Maritime Self-Defense Force
- Commissioned: 27 March 1986
- Status: In active service

== Hobart-class destroyer ==
- Builders: Spain (Navantia, in Ferrol)
- Type: Air Warfare Destroyer
- Displacement: 7,000 tons
- Aircraft: MH-60 Seahawk
- Armament: *48-cell Mark 41 Vertical Launch System, RIM-66 Standard 2 missile, RIM-162 Evolved Sea Sparrow missile, 2 × 4-canister Harpoon missile launchers, 1 × Mark 45 (Mod 4) 5-inch gun, 2 × Mark 32 Mod 9 two-tube torpedo launchers, Eurotorp MU90 torpedoes, 1 × Phalanx CIWS, 2 × 25mm M242 Bushmaster autocannons in Typhoon mounts
- Powerplant: Combined diesel or gas (CODOG) arrangement, 2 × General Electric Marine model 7LM2500-SA-MLG38 gas turbines, 17,500 kilowatts (23,500 hp) each, 2 × Caterpillar Bravo 16 V Bravo diesel engines, 5,650 kilowatts (7,580 hp) each, 2 × controllable pitch propellers
- Speed: Over 28 knots (52 km/h; 32 mph)
- Range: Over 5,000 nautical miles (9,300 km; 5,800 mi) at 18 knots (33 km/h; 21 mph)
- Ships in class: 3
- Operator: Royal Australian Navy
- Commissioned: 2017
- Status: In active service

== Horizon-class destroyer ==
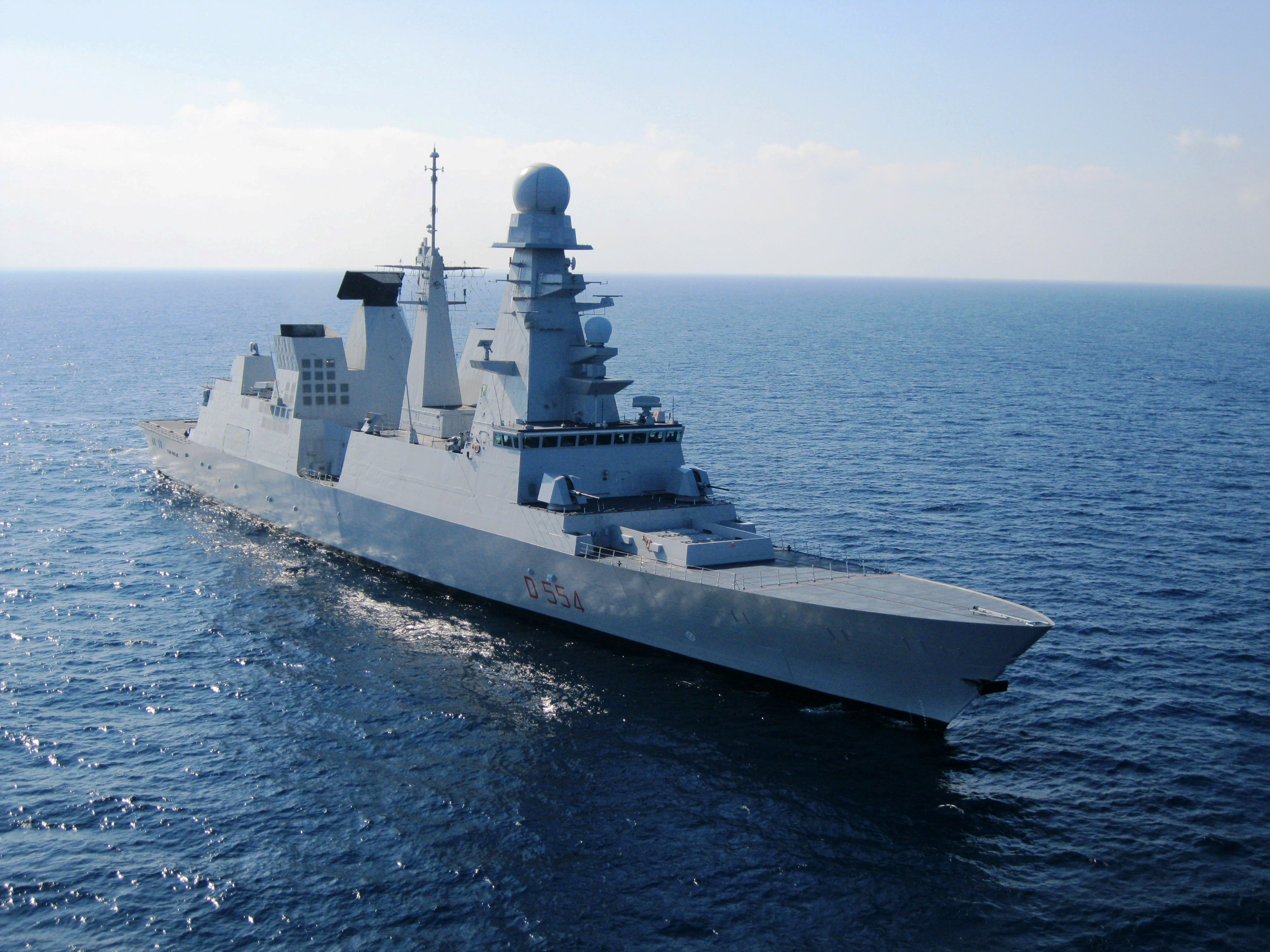
Caio Duilio (Italian Navy)

- Builders: France, Italy
- Type: Anti-air warfare frigate
- Displacement: 5,290 tons (7,050 tons full load)
- Aircraft: 1 NH90 or EH101
- Armament: 8 × ExocetMM40 SSM (French version) or 8 × TESEO Mk 2/A SSM (Italian version), 2 × Otobreda 76 mm super rapid guns, 2 × 20 mm modèle F2 guns or 2 × KBA Oerlikon 25 mm/80, PAAMS (Principal Anti-Air Missile System): Sylver A50 vertical launchers with 32 Aster 30 and 16 Aster 15 missiles, 2 × MU90 Impact double torpedo tubes, 2 × SCLAR-H chaff, decoy and flares launchers, 2 × SLAT anti torpedo system
- Powerplant: 2 × 31,280 hp GE/Avio General Electric LM2500 gas turbines, 2 × 5,875 hp SEMT Pielstick 12 PA6 STC diesels
- Speed: 29 knots
- Range: 7,000 nmi at 18 knots
- Ships in class: 4
- Operator: French Navy, Marina Militare
- Commissioned: 2007
- Status: In active service

== Kashin (Project 61M)-class destroyer ==
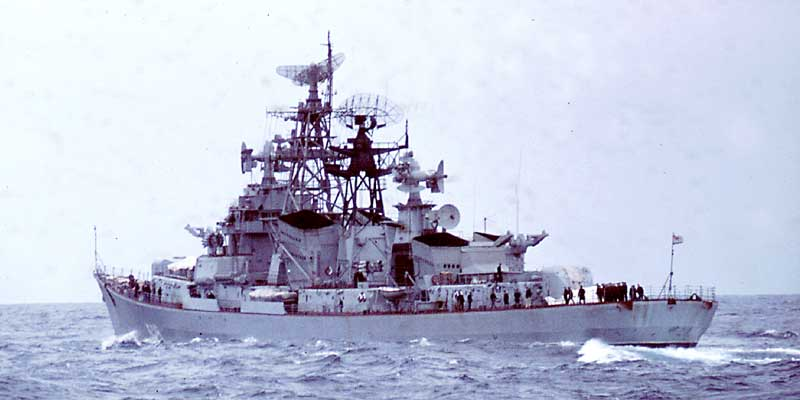
Kashin

- Builder: Soviet Union
- Type: Surface warfare guided-missile destroyer
- Displacement: 4,390 tons
- Armament: 32 SA-N-1 SAM; 4 × 76 mm guns; 5 × 533 mm torpedo tubes; 4 RBU-6000
- Powerplant: COGAG arrangement; 4 M8E gas turbines; 2 shafts; 72,000 shp (54 MW) total power
- Speed: 33 knots (61 km/h)
- Range: 3,500 nmi (6,500 km) at 18 knots (33 km/h)
- Ships in class: 25 total: 14 Kashin, 6 Kashin Mod, and 5 Rajput class
- Operators: Soviet Navy, Indian Navy,
- Commissioned: 1960
- Status: 2 Rajput in active service

== Kee Lung (Kidd)-class destroyer ==
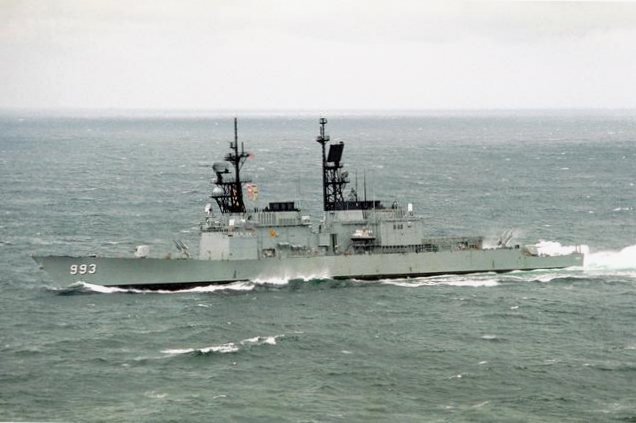
Kidd

- Builders: United States
- Type: Guided-missile destroyer
- Displacement: 9,783 tons
- Armament: 2 × Mark 26 Standard missile launchers, 2 × Mark 141 quad launcher with 8 × RGM-84 Harpoon, 2 × Mark 15 20mm Phalanx CIWS, 2 × Mark 45 5in/54 caliber gun, 2 × Mark 32 triple tube mounts with 6 × Mark 46 torpedoes
  1 × Mark 112 ASROC launcher
- Propulsion: 4 × General Electric LM2500-30 gas turbines, 80,000 shp total
- Speed: 35 knots
- Ships in class: 4
- Operators: Republic of China Navy
- Commissioned: 21 March 1981
- Status: In active service

== Kolkata-class destroyer ==
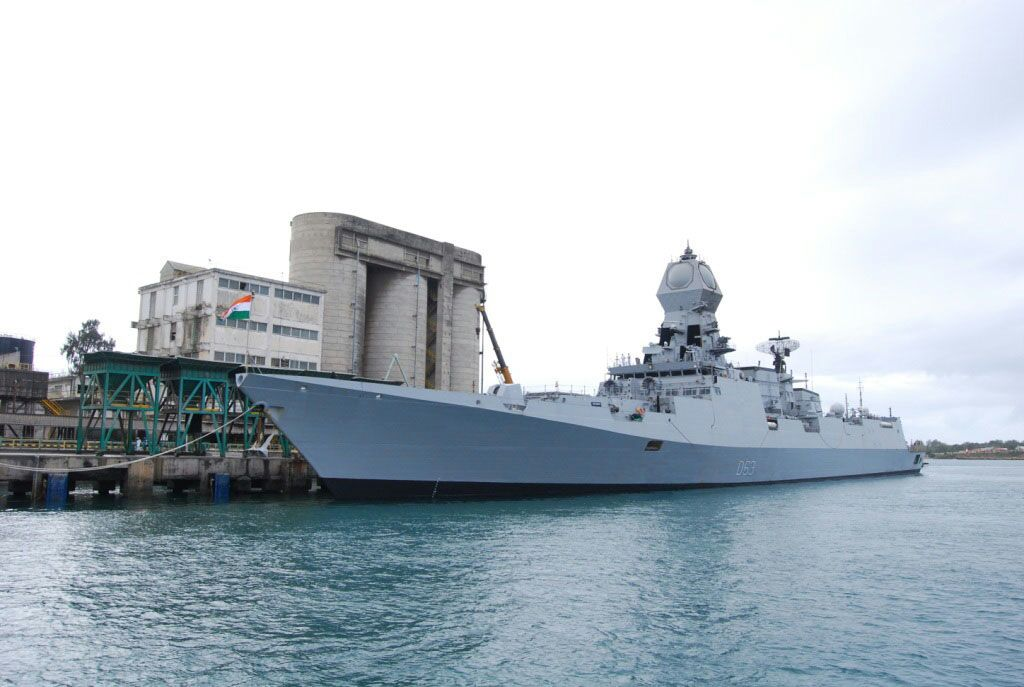
INS Kolkata

- Builders: India (Mazagaon Dockyard)
- Type: Guided-missile destroyer
- Displacement: 7,400 tons
- Aircraft: 2 Sea King or Dhruv helicopters
- Armament: 16 × BrahMos SSM; 32 × Barak-8 SAM; 1 × 76 mm SRGM; 4 × 30 mm AK-630; 4 × 533 mm PTA 533 quintuple torpedo tube launchers; 2 × RBU-6000 Anti-submarine rocket launchers
- Powerplant: 4 × gas turbines
- Speed: in excess of 30 knots
- Ships in class: 3 total
- Operator: Indian Navy
- Commissioned: 16 August 2014
- Status: All in active service

== Kongō-class destroyer ==
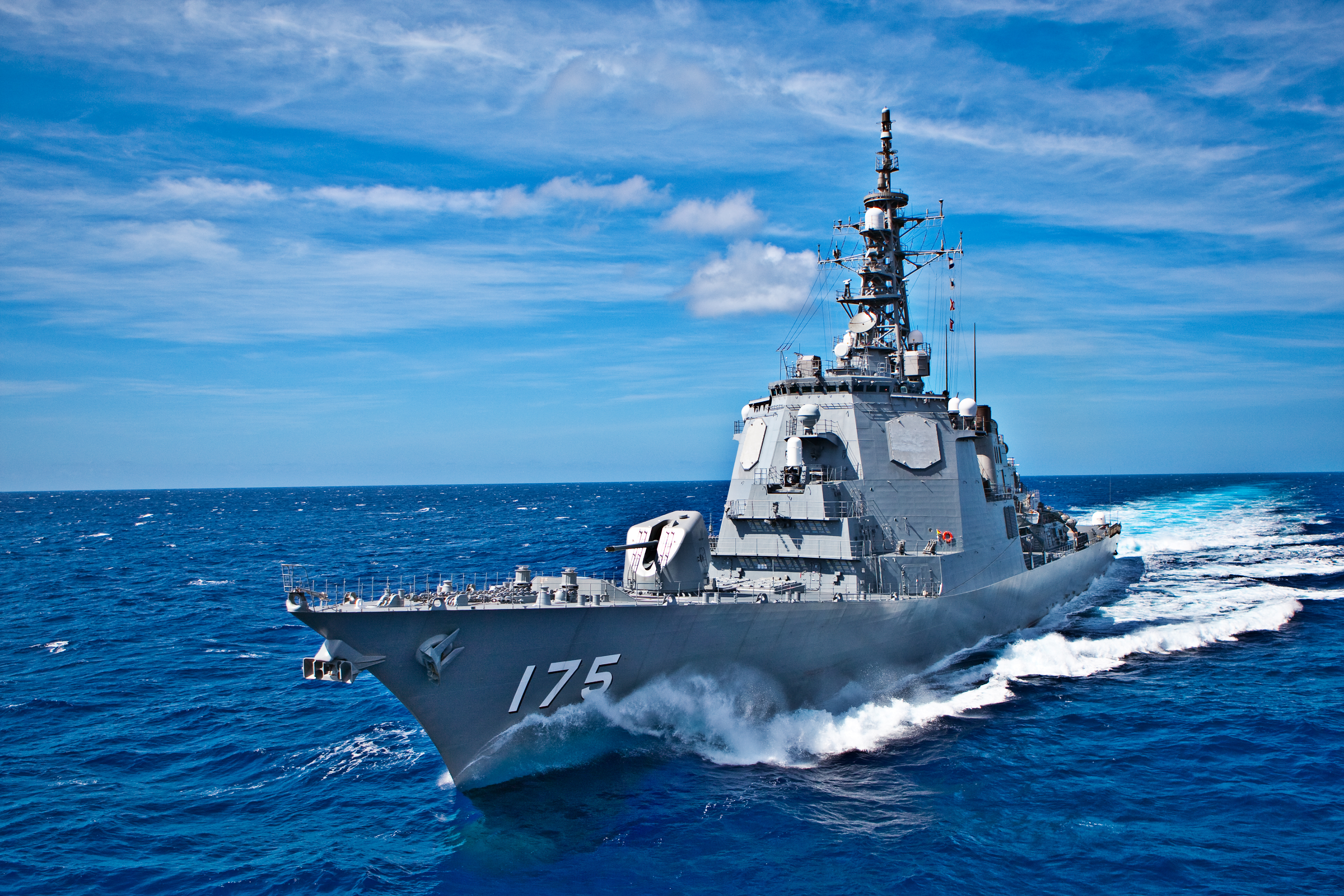
Myōkō

- Builders: Japan (Mitsubishi in Nagasaki, Ishihari in Tokyo)
- Type: Large Air Defense guided-missile destroyer
- Displacement: 9,485 tons
- Armament: RGM-84 Harpoon SSM, RIM-66 Standard SAM, RUM-139 Vertical Launch ASROC, 1 × 5 inch (127 mm) / 54 caliber Oto-Breda Compact Gun, 2 × 20 mm Phalanx CIWS, 2 × Mark 32 triple torpedo tubes (6 × Mk-46 torpedoes)
- Powerplant: 4 × Ishikawajima Harima/General Electric LM2500-30(100,000 shp)
- Speed: 30 knots
- Ships in class: 4
- Operator: Japan Maritime Self-Defense Force
- Commissioned: 25 March 1993
- Status: In active service

== Maya-class destroyer ==
- Builder: Japan (JMU)
- Type: Large guided-missile destroyer
- Displacement: 10,250 tons
- Armament: 1 × 5-inch (127 mm)/62 Mk. 45 Mod 4 gun, 8 × Type 17 anti-ship missiles in quad canisters, 2 × 20 mm Phalanx CIWS, 2 × HOS-303 triple torpedo tubes (Mark 46, Type 97, or Type 12 torpedoes), 96-cell Mk. 41 Vertical Launching System (SM-2MR Standard Missile, SM-3 Anti-Ballistic Missile, SM-6 Standard Missile, Type 07 VL-ASROC, and RIM-162 Evolved Sea Sparrow)
- Powerplant: COGLAG
- Speed: 30 knots
- Ships in class: 2
- Operator: Japan Maritime Self-Defense Force
- Commissioned: 19 March 2020
- Status: In active service

== Murasame-class destroyer ==
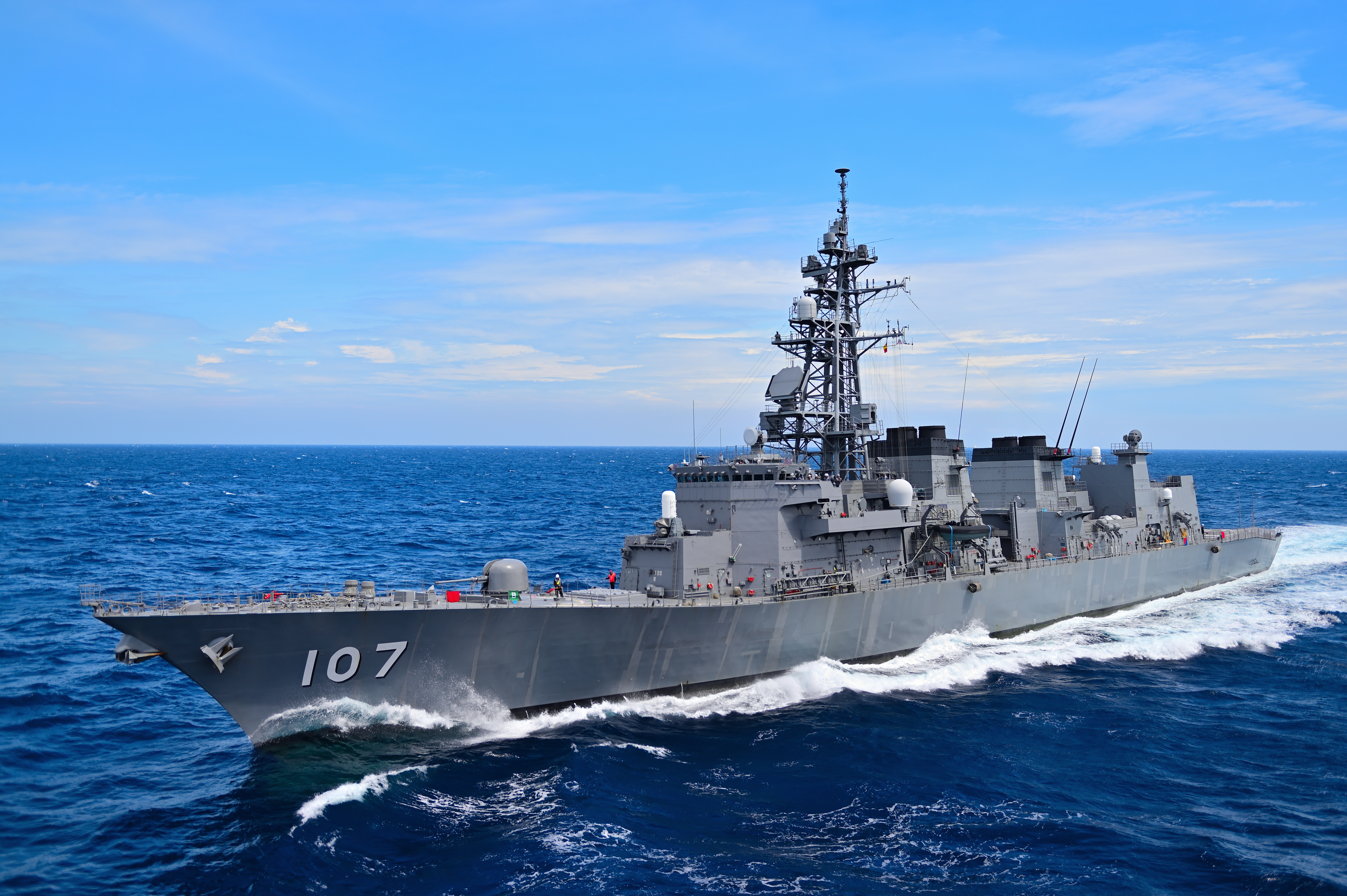
Ikazuchi

- Builders: Japan (IHI in Tokyo and others)
- Type: Multi-role destroyer
- Displacement: 4,550 tons (6,200 tons full load)
- Armament: SSM-1B SSM, Sea Sparrow SSM, ASROC anti-submarine rocket, 1 × 76 mm 62 cal rapid fire gun (OTO Melara 3), 2 × 20 mm CIWS, 2 × Type 68 triple torpedo tubes
- Powerplant: 4 gas turbines, two shafts (60, 000 shaft horsepower)
- Speed: 30 knots
- Ships in class: 9
- Operator: Japan Maritime Self-Defense Force
- Commissioned: 12 March 1996
- Status: In active service

== Sejong the Great (KDX-III)-class destroyer ==
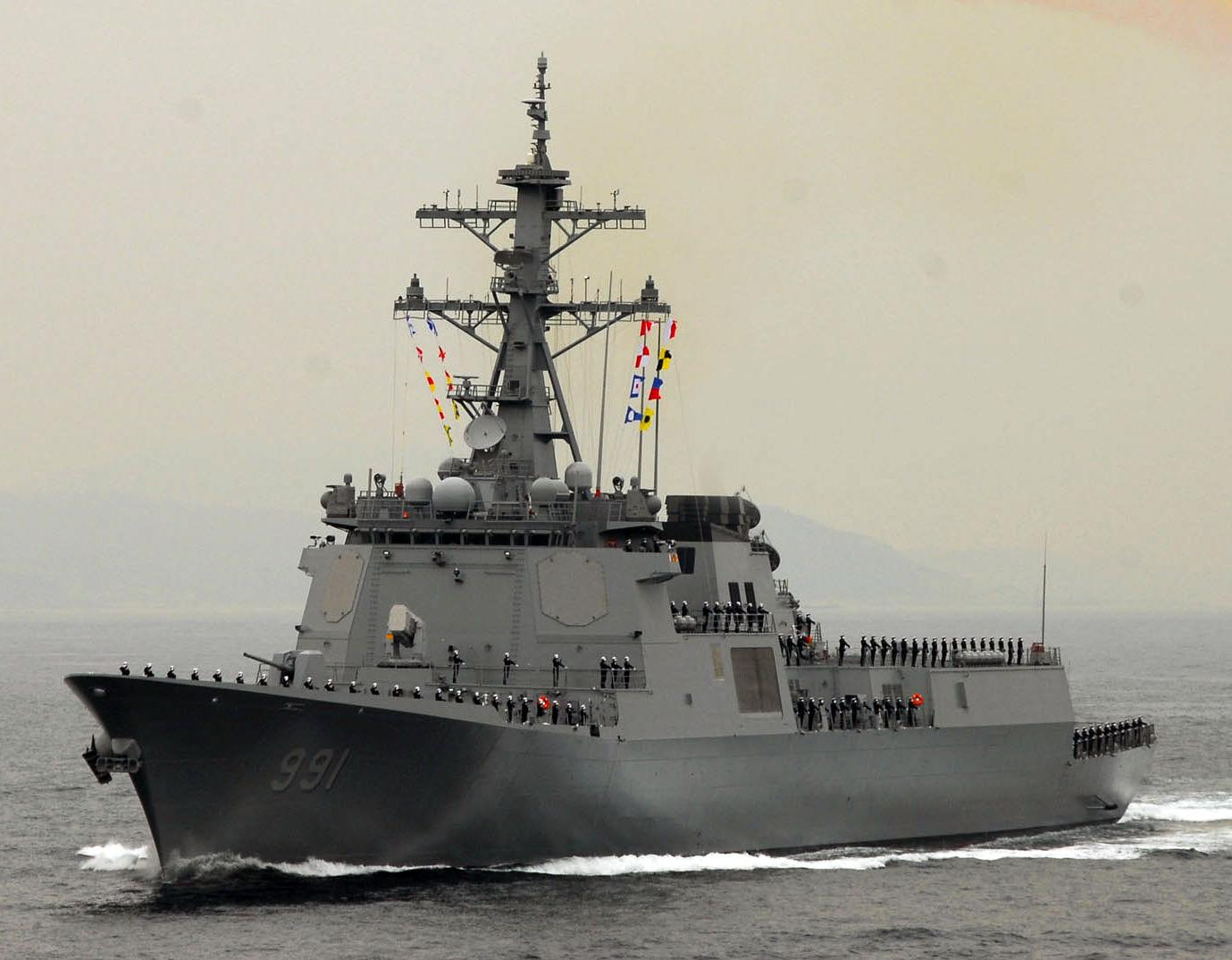
Sejong the Great

- Builders: South Korea (Hyundai Heavy Industries)
- Type: Guided-missile destroyer
- Displacement: 10,600 tons
- Armament: 1 × 5-inch (127 mm/L62) Mk-45 Mod 4 (lightweight gun), 1 × 30 mm Goalkeeper CIWS, 1 × RIM-116 Rolling Airframe Missile launcher, SM-2 Block IIIB in Mk. 41 80-cell Vertical Launching System, 4 × SSM-700K Hae Sung long-range anti-ship missile launchers with four missiles in each launcher, 32 × Hyunmoo IIIC land-attack cruise missiles + 16 × K-ASROC in 48-cell Vertical Launching System, 32 × K745 LW Cheong Sahng-uh torpedoes
- Aircraft: 2 × Westland Lynx Mk.99 ASW helicopters with full accommodations including hangars
- Powerplant: 4 General Electric LM2500 COGAG; two shafts, (100,000 total shaft horsepower (75 MW))
- Speed: 30 knots
- Ships in class: 3
- Operator: Republic of Korea Navy
- Commissioned: 25 May 2007
- Status: In active service

== Sovremenny (Project 956 Sarych)-class destroyer ==
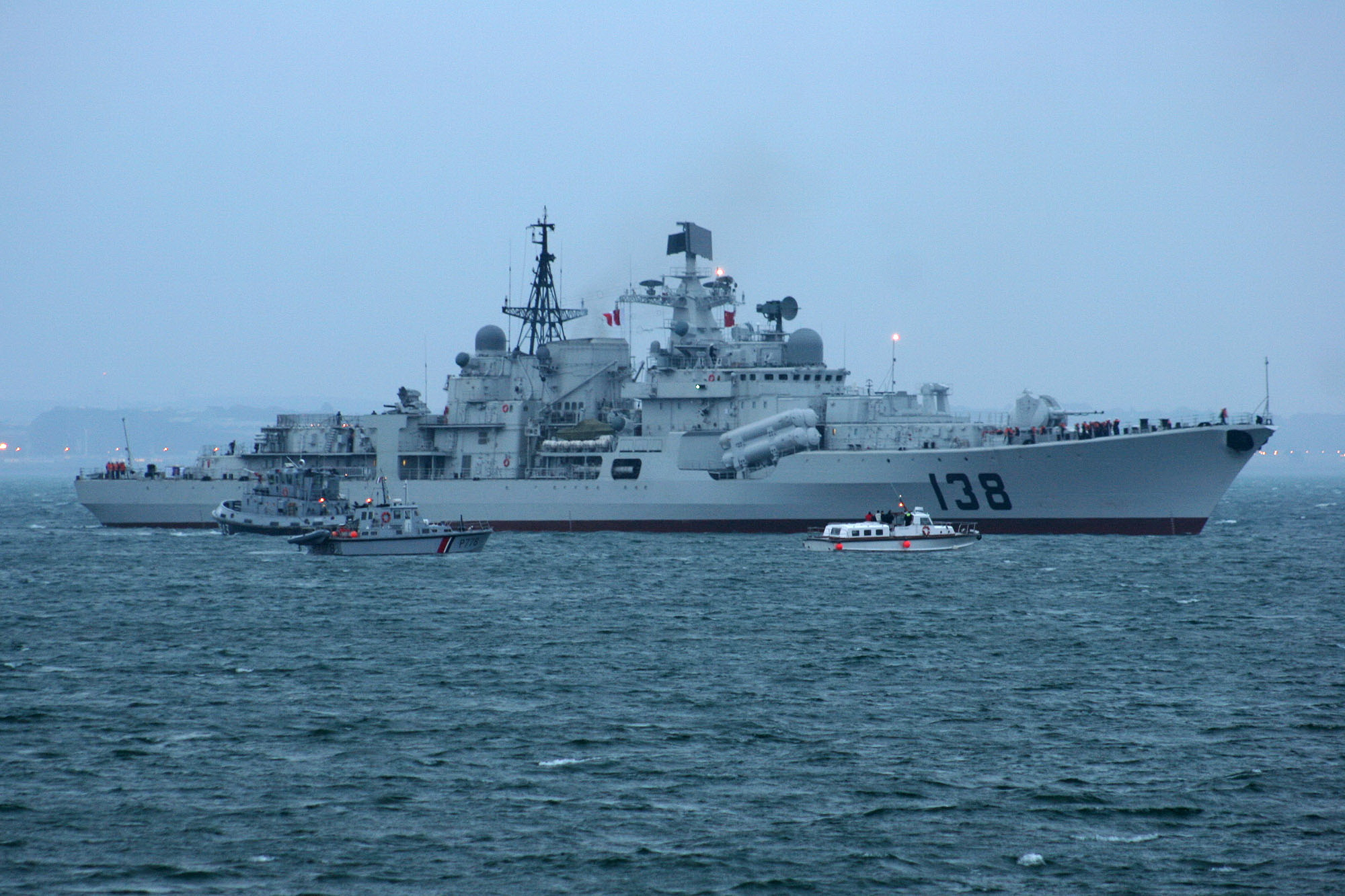
Taizhou (Chinese Navy)

- Builders: Soviet Union / Russia (Severnaya Verf 190 in St. Petersburg)
- Type: Large surface-warfare guided-missile destroyer
- Displacement: 8,480 tons
- Aircraft: 1 Kamov Ka-27 Helix
- Armament: 8 Moskit SSM; 48 SA-N-7 SAM; 4 × 130 mm guns; 4 AK-630 CIWS
- Powerplant: 4 boilers; 2 steam turbines; 2 shafts; 99,500 shp total power
- Speed: 32 knots
- Ships in class: 25 total: 14 Project 956; 9 Project 956A; 2 Project 956ME
- Operators: Soviet Navy, Russian Navy, People's Liberation Army Navy
- Commissioned: 25 December 1980
- Status: Retired by Russia, 4 in service with People's Republic of China; 2 awaiting disposal; 4 cancelled before completion; 2 scrapped

== Takanami-class destroyer ==
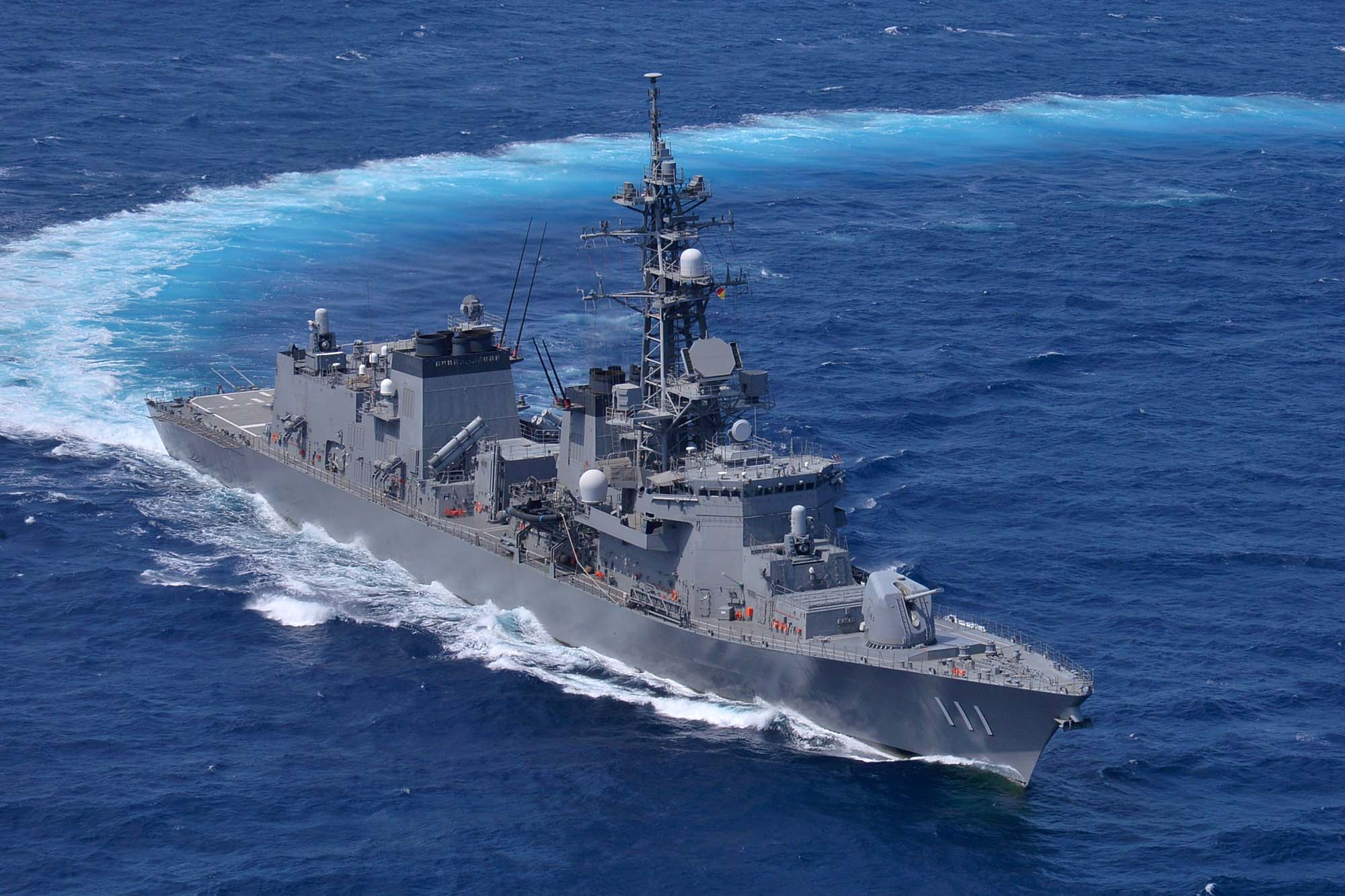
Ōnami

- Builders: Japan
- Type: Multi-role destroyer
- Displacement: 6,300 tons
- Armament: Mitsubishi Type 90 SSM-1B SSM, Sea Sparrow SSM, ASROC anti-submarine rocket, 1 × Otobreda 127 mm/54 gun, 2 × 20 mm CIWS, 2 × Type 68 triple torpedo tubes
- Powerplant: 4 gas turbines, two shafts (60,000 shaft horsepower)
- Speed: 30 knots
- Ships in class: 5
- Operator: Japan Maritime Self-Defense Force
- Commissioned: 12 March 2003
- Status: In active service

== Type 42 destroyer ==
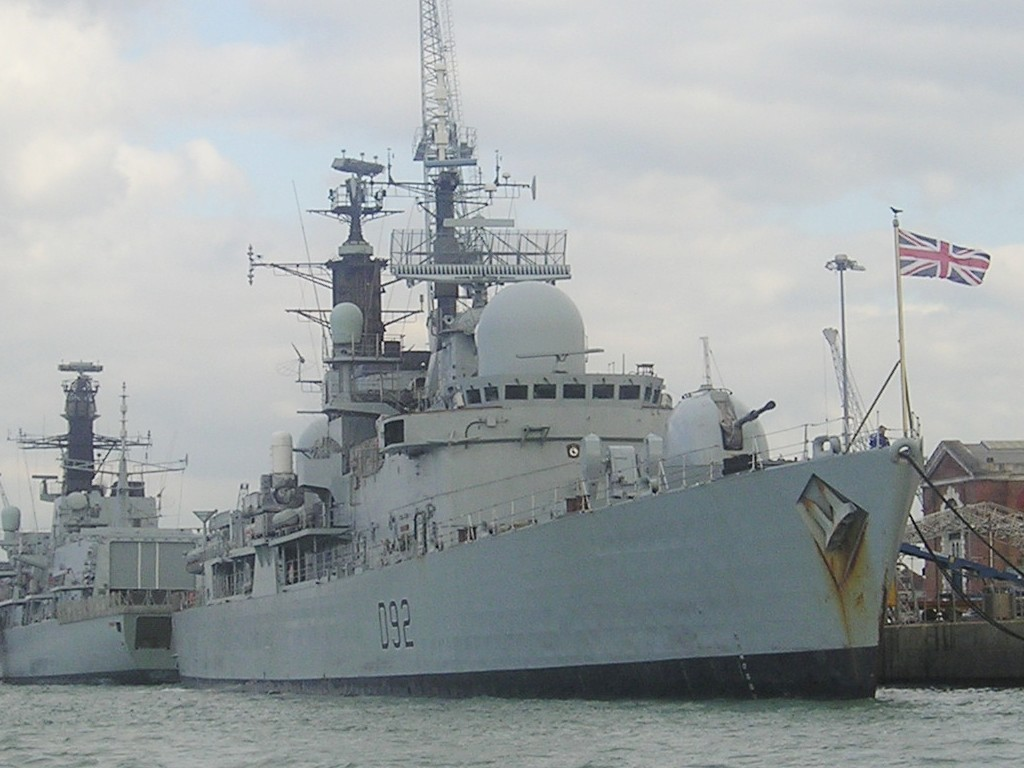
Liverpool

- Builders: United Kingdom
- Type: Guided-missile destroyer
- Displacement:
  - Batch 1 & 2: 4350 tons
  - Batch 3: 5,350
- Aircraft: 1 Westland Lynx helicopter
- Armament: Early: GWS-30 Sea Dart anti-aircraft missile, 1 × Vickers 4.5-inch gun, 2 × 20 mm Oerlikon guns; Later: 2 × three tube STWS-1 launchers for (Mk 44 / 46, Stingray) torpedoes, 2 × 20 mm Phalanx CIWS, 4 × Oerlikon / BMARC 30 mm L/75 KCB guns in GCM-A03 twin mounts, 2 × Oerlikon / BMARC 20 mm BMARC L/70 KBA guns in GAM-B01 single mounts
- Powerplant: 2 Rolls-Royce Olympus TM3B high-speed gas turbines and 2 Rolls-Royce Tyne RM1A cruise gas turbines
- Speed: 30 knots
- Ships in class: 16 total: 8 Batch I, 4 Batch II, 4 Batch 3
- Operators: Royal Navy, Argentine Navy
- Commissioned: 16 February 1975
- Status: 1 in active service, 2 sunk, 12 scrapped, 1 decommissioned

== Type 45 destroyer ==
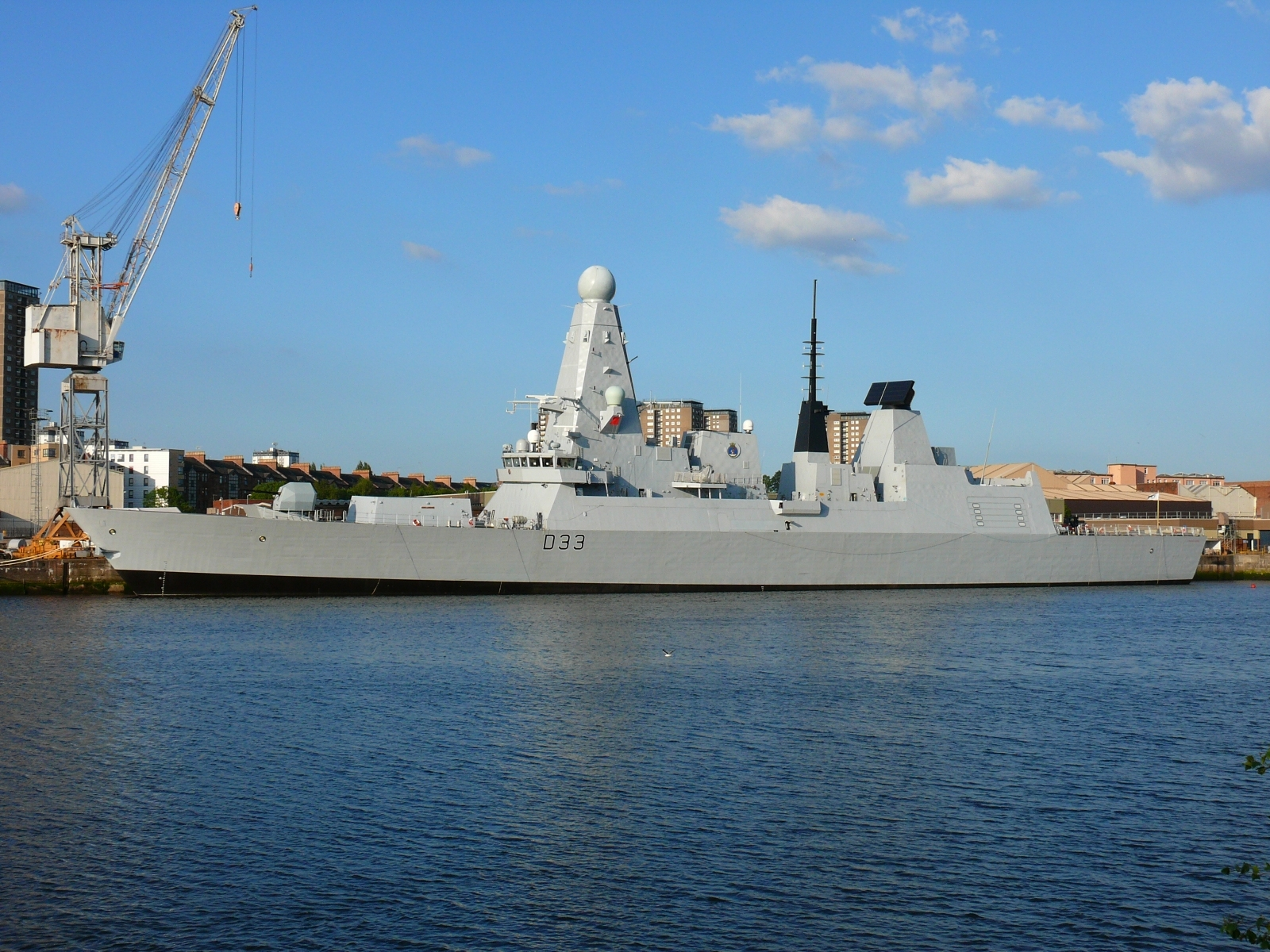
Dauntless

- Builders: United Kingdom
- Type: Air defense destroyer
- Displacement: 8,500 tons
- Aircraft: 1 Westland Lynx HMA8 helicopter or 1 × Merlin HM1 helicopter
- Armament: SYLVER missile launcher, 48 × MBDA Aster missiles (Aster 15 and Aster 30), 2 × 20 mm Phalanx CIWS close-in weapons systems (fitted for but not with), 1 × 4.5-inch (113 mm) Mk 8 mod 1 gun, 2 × Oerlikon 30 mm KCB guns on DS-30B mounts, NATO Seagnat countermeasures launchers, SSTDS underwater decoy
- Powerplant: 2 Rolls-Royce WR-21 gas turbines (21.5 MW); 2 Converteam electric motors (20 MW)
- Speed: 29+ knots
- Ships in class: 6 total
- Operators: Royal Navy
- Commissioned: 23 July 2009
- Status: 6 in active service

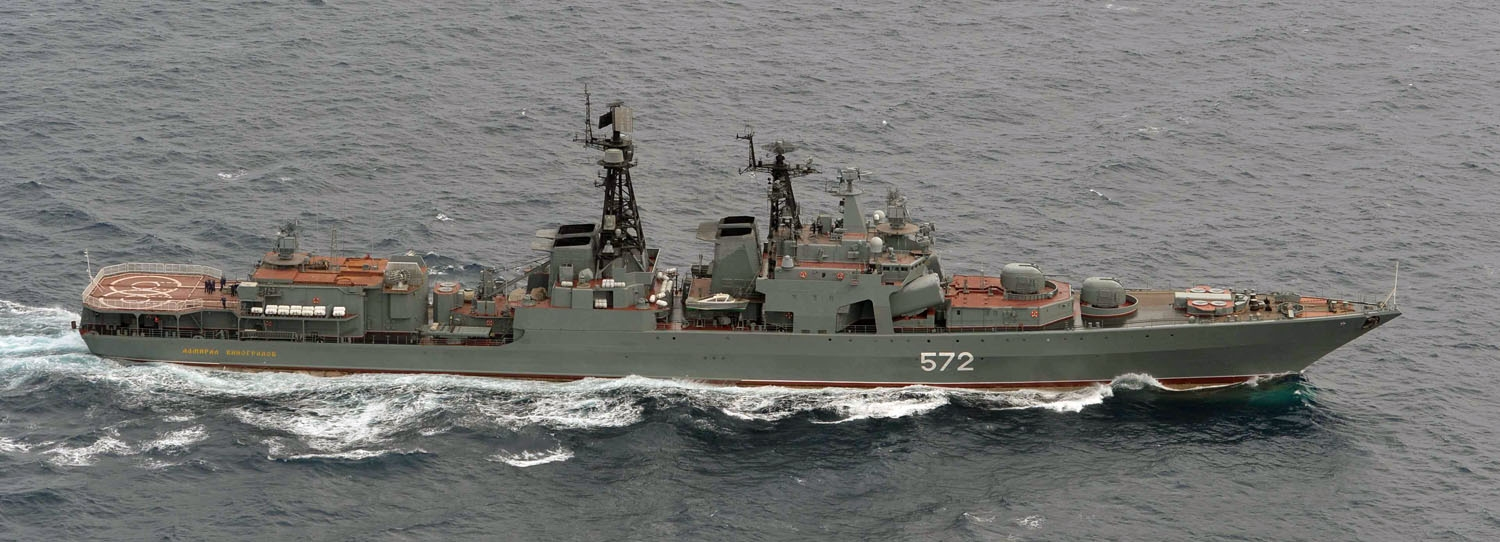
Udaloy I-class

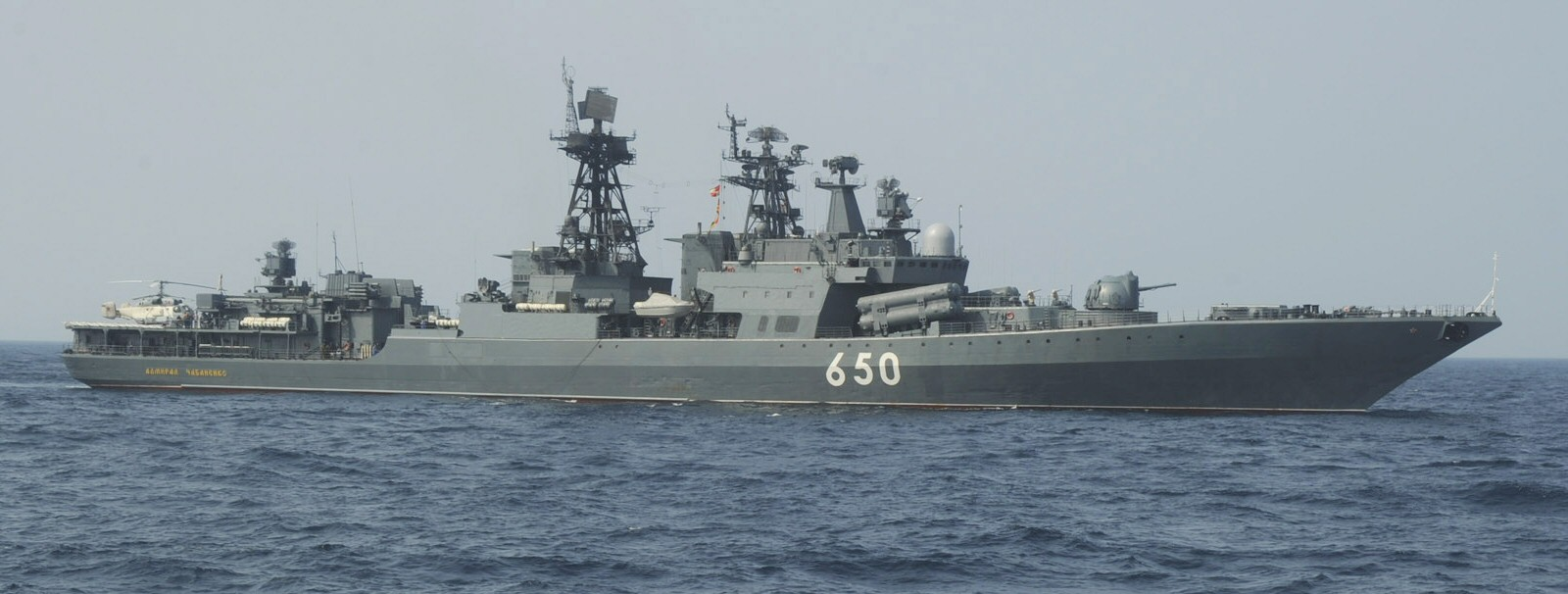
Udaloy-II class: Admiral Chabanenko

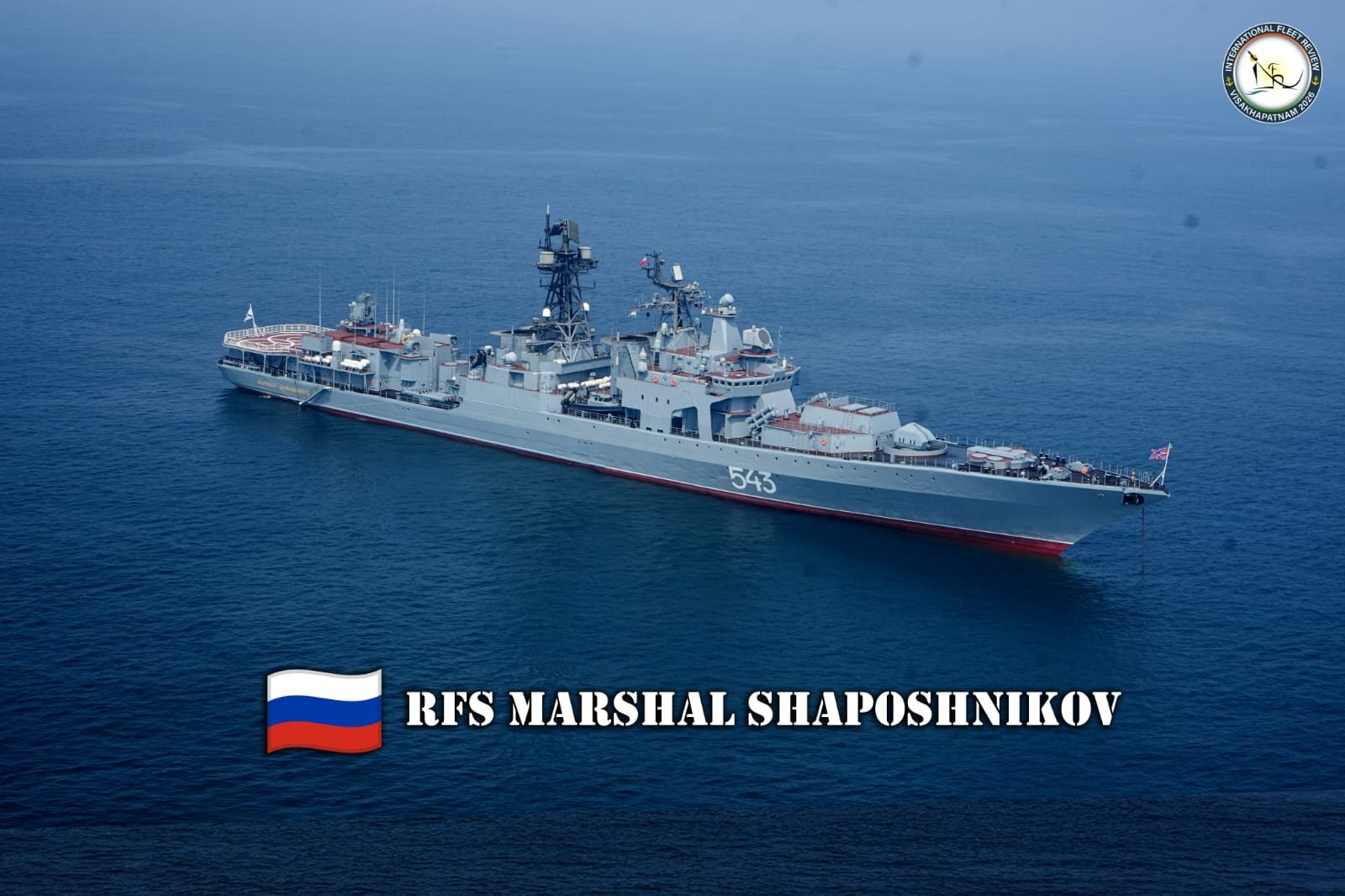
Modernized Udaloy I-class: Marshal Shaposhnikov

== Udaloy (Project 1155 Fregat)-class destroyer ==
- Builders: Soviet Union / Russia (Yantar Zavod 180 in Kaliningrad)
- Type: Large anti-submarine guided-missile destroyer (Russian designation of 'large anti-submarine ship')
- Displacement: 7,620 tons
- Aircraft: 2 Kamov Ka-27 helicopters
- Armament: Udaloy I: 2 x 4 SS-N-14 ASM/AShM; 8 x 8 SA-N-9 SAM; 2 x 100 mm AK-100 guns; 4 x 30 mm AK-630 CIWS; 2 x RBU-6000; 2 × 1 21KM AA guns, 2 × 4 torpedo tubes forType 53 torpedoes. Udaloy II: 2 x 4 SS-N-22 AShM; 8 x 8 SA-N-9 SAM; 1 x 130 mm AK-130 gun; 2 x CADS-N-1 CIWS, 2 x RBU-6000, 2 x 4 torpedo tubes for Type 53 torpedoes. Modernized Udaloy I (Marshal Shaposhnikov): 2 x 8 3S14 VLS cells for Kalibr (SS-N-27), Onyx (SS-N-26), Otvet (and possibly hypersonic Zircon (SS-N-33)) cruise missiles, 2 x 4 SS-N-25 AShM, 1 x 100 mm A-190 gun; 4 x 30 mm AK-630 CIWS; 2 x RBU-6000; 2 × 4 torpedo tubes forType 53 torpedoes.
- Powerplant: COGAG arrangement; 2 M8KF and 2 M62 gas turbines; 60,000 shp total power
- Speed: 29 knots
- Ships in class: 15 total: 12 Udaloy I and 3 (1 completed and 2 cancelled) Udaloy II
- Operator: Soviet Navy, Russian Navy
- Commissioned: 1980
- Status: 6 Udaloy I in active service and 1 Udaloy II in refit; 2 burned; 2 stricken; 1 in overhaul; 2 Udaloy II cancelled before completion

== Visakhapatnam class-class destroyer ==
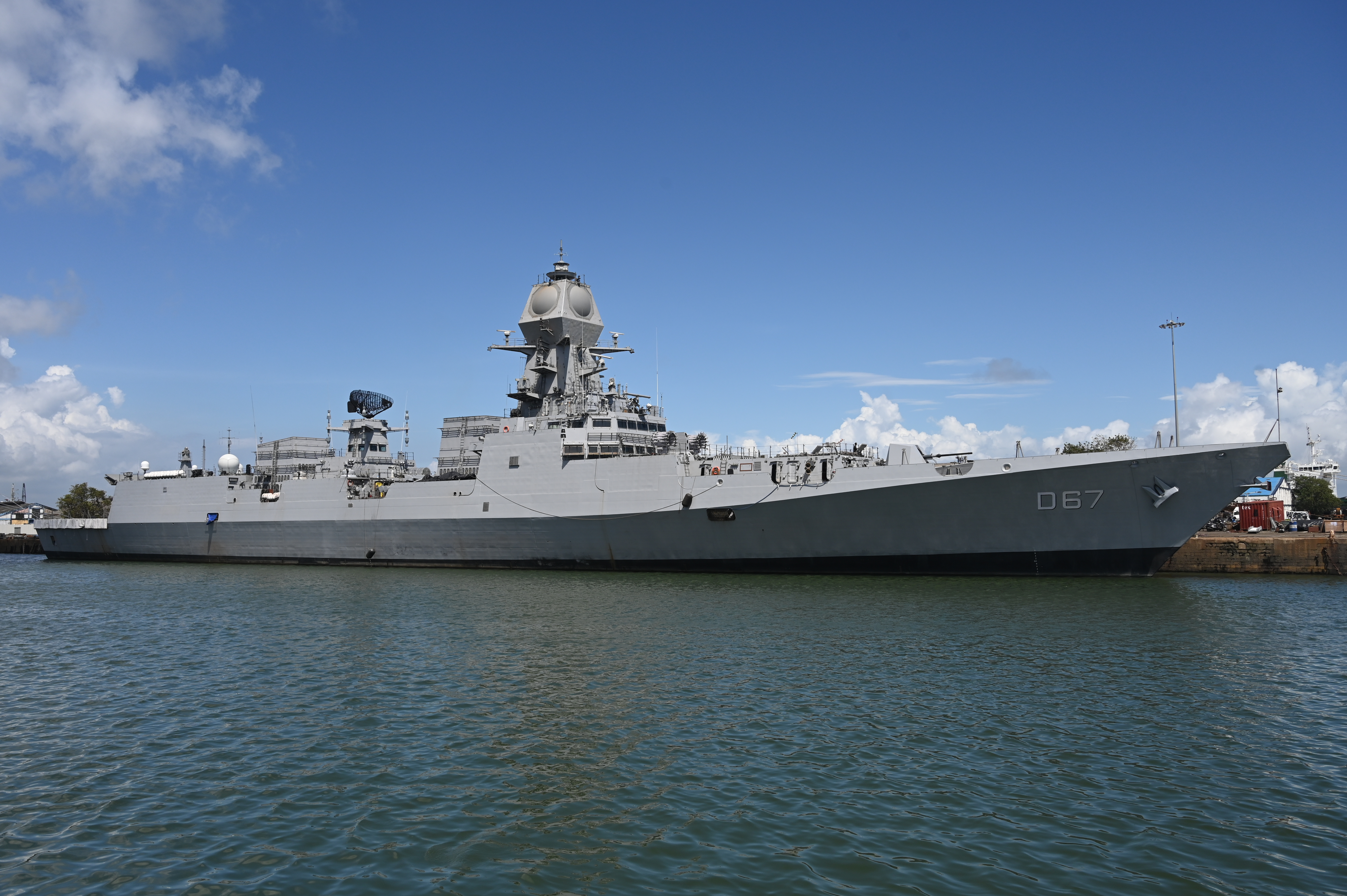
INS Mormugao

- Builders: India (Mazagaon Dockyard)
- Type: Guided-missile destroyer
- Displacement: 7,400 tons
- Aircraft: 2 Sea King or Dhruv helicopters
- Armament: 16 × BrahMos SSM; 32 × Barak-8 SAM; 1 × 76 mm SRGM; 4 × 30 mm AK-630; 4 × 533 mm PTA 533 quintuple torpedo tube launchers; 2 × RBU-6000 Anti-submarine rocket launchers
- Powerplant: 4 × gas turbines
- Speed: in excess of 30 knots
- Ships in class: 4 total
- Operator: Indian Navy
- Commissioned: 21 November 2021
- Status: 2 active service

== Zumwalt-class destroyer ==
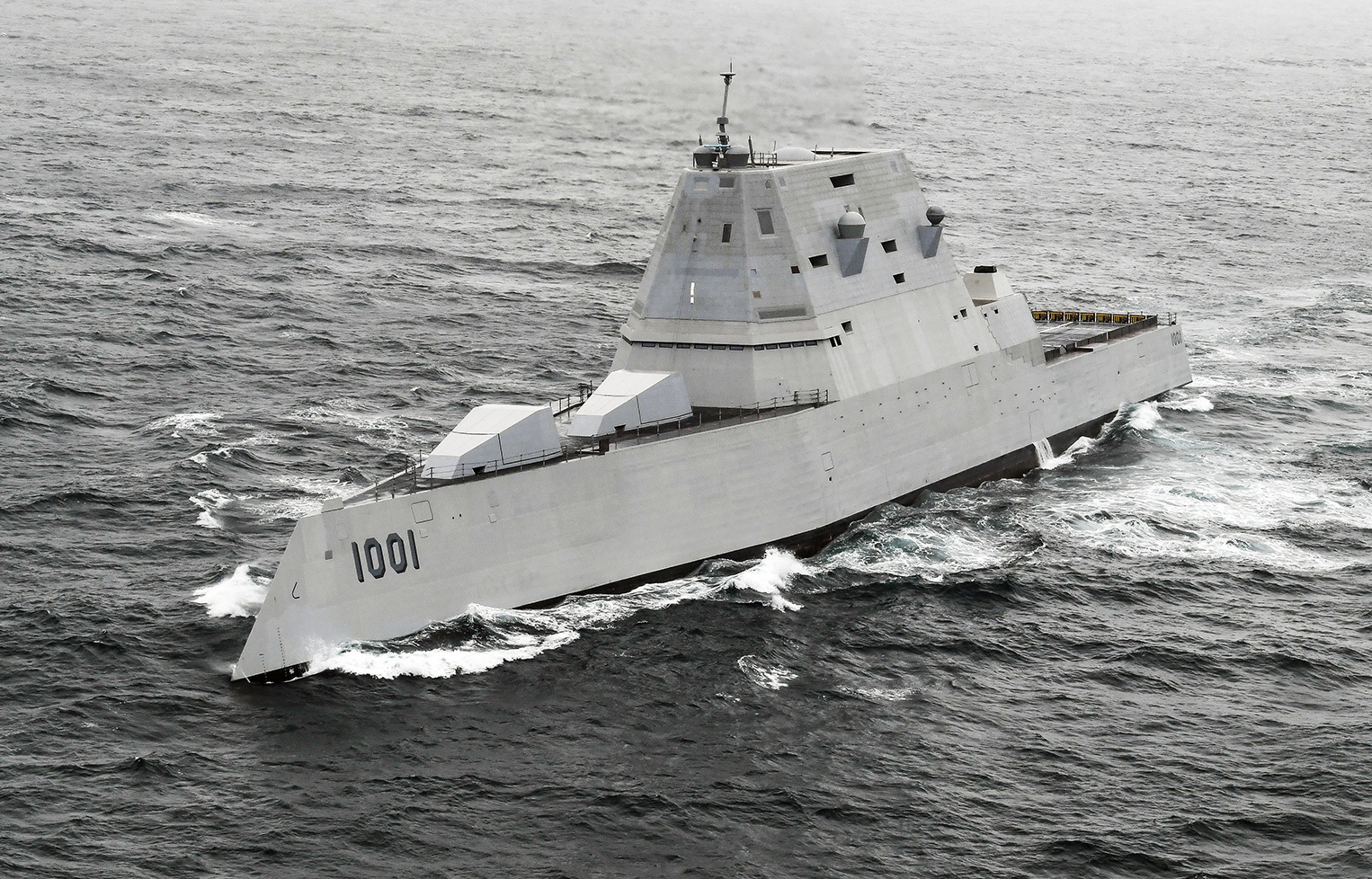
USS Michael Monsoor (DDG-1001)

- Type: Multi-mission stealth ships
- Builder: United States
- Displacement: 15,907 tons
- Aircraft: 1 × SH-60 LAMPS or MH-60R helicopter, 3 × MQ-8 Fire Scout VT-UAVs
- Armament: 80 VLS launch cells in 20 × Mk 57 VLS RIM-162 Evolved Sea Sparrow Missile (ESSM), 4 per cell, Tactical Tomahawk, 1 per cell, Vertical Launch Anti-Submarine Missile (ASROC), 1 per cell, 2 × 155 mm (6 in)/62 caliber Advanced Gun System; (unusable, no ammunition); 2 × 30 mm (1.2 in) Mk 46 Mod 2 Gun Weapon System
- Propulsion: 2 × Rolls-Royce MT30 gas turbines (35.4 MW (47,500 hp) each) driving Curtiss-Wright electric generators, 2 × Rolls-Royce RR4500 turbine generators (3.8 MW (5,100 hp) each), 2 × propellers driven by electric motors, Total: 78 MW (105,000 shp)
- Speed: 30 knots (56 km/h)
- Ships in class: 3
- Operator: United States Navy
- Commissioned: 15 October 2016
- Status: 2 in active service, 1 under construction

== See also ==
- List of naval ship classes in service

== Sources ==
- Saunders, Stephan, ed. (2015). Jane's Fighting Ships 2015-2016. Jane's Information Group. ISBN 978-0710631435.
