= JS Haguro =

Maya-class guided missile destroyer

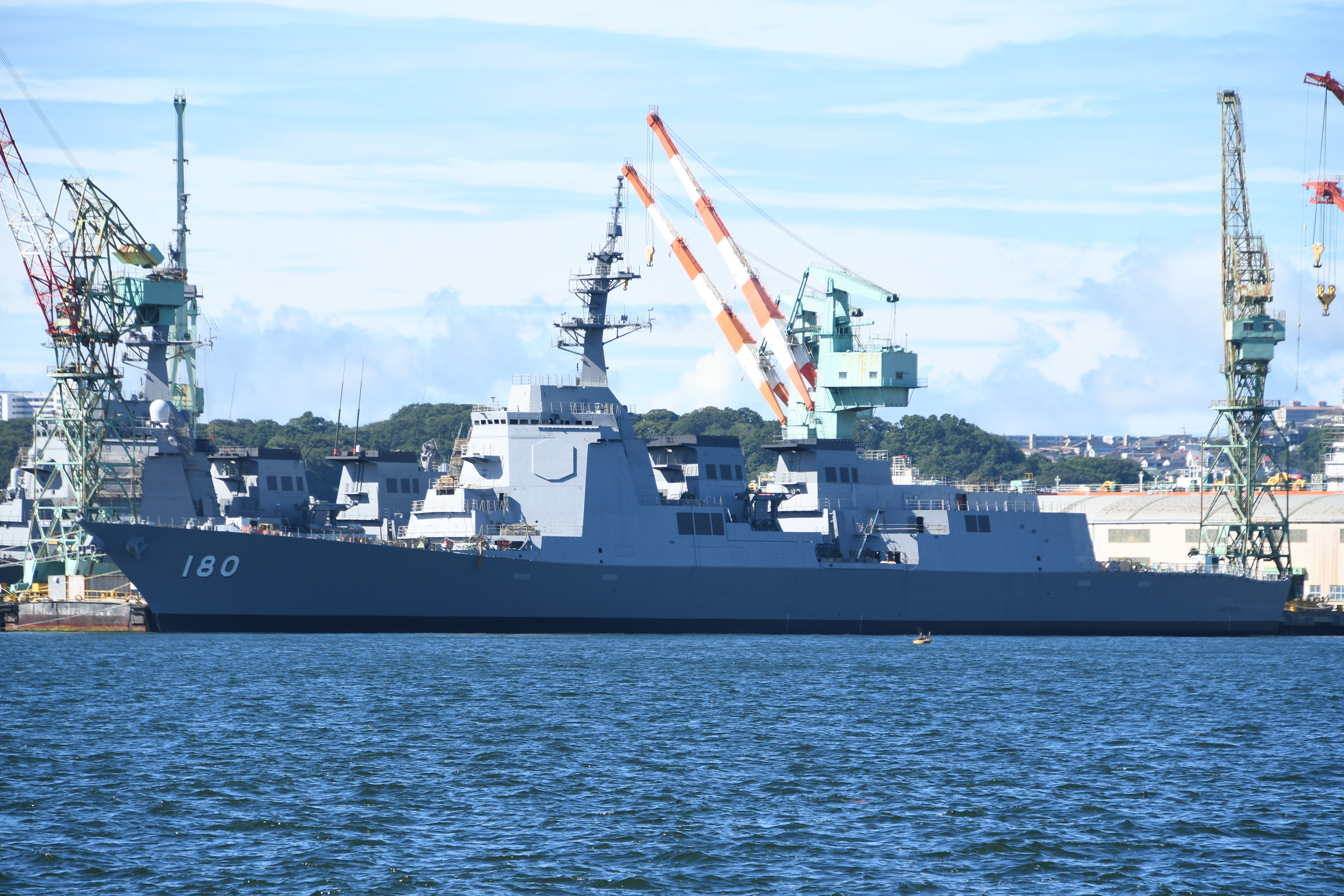
- JS Haguro on 26 July 2019

History

Japan
- Name: Haguro; (はぐろ)
- Namesake: Mount Haguro
- Ordered: 2016
- Builder: JMU, Yokohama
- Laid down: 23 January 2018
- Launched: 17 July 2019
- Commissioned: 19 March 2021
- Identification: MMSI number: 431999502; Callsign: JSLL; Pennant number: DDG-180
- Status: Active
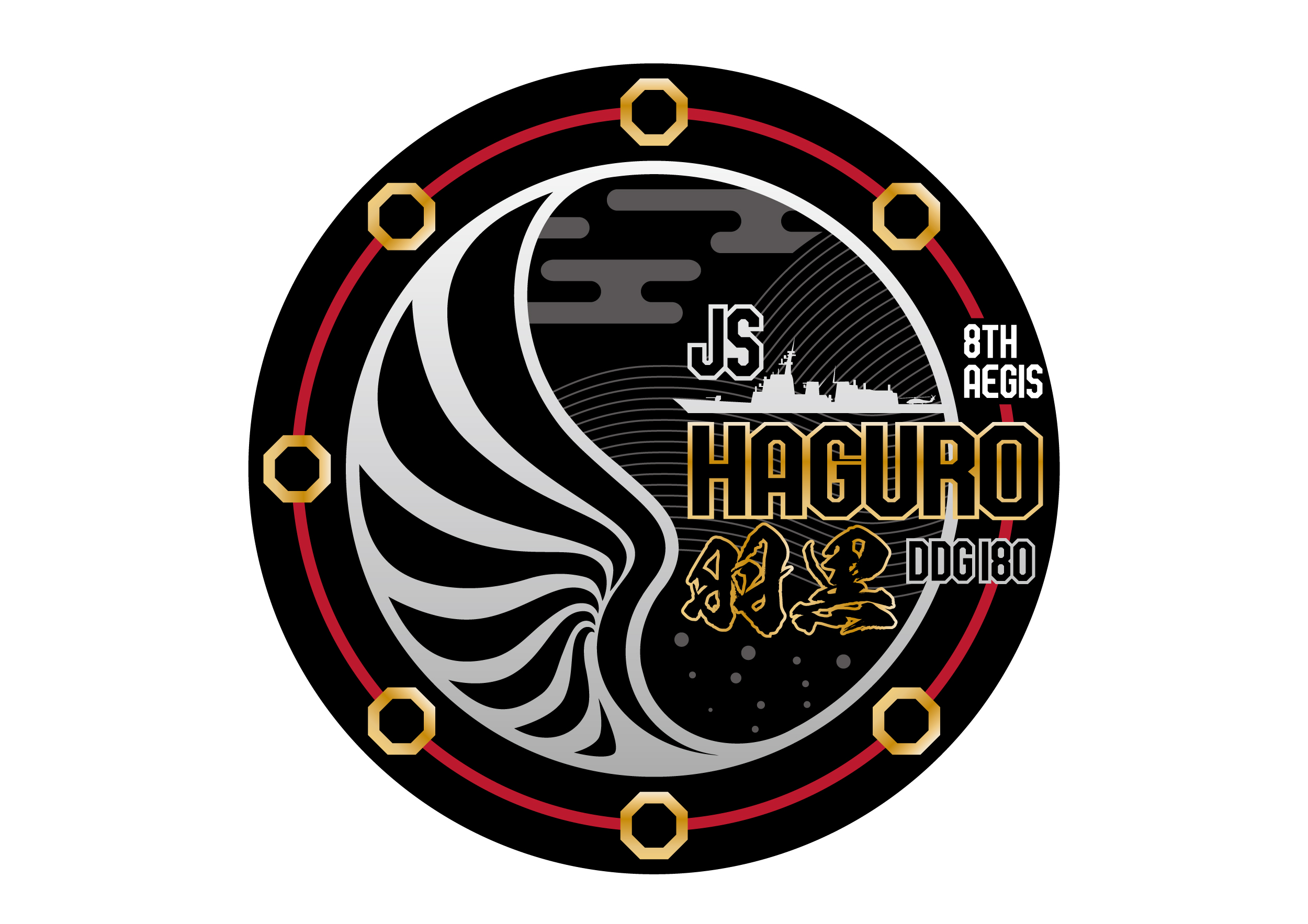
- Badge

General characteristics
- Class & type: Maya-class destroyer
- Displacement: 8,200 long tons (8,332 t) standard; 10,250 long tons (10,414 t) full load
- Length: 169.9 m (557 ft 5 in)
- Beam: 22.2 m (72 ft 10 in)
- Draft: 6.4 m (21 ft 0 in)
- Depth: 13 m (42 ft 8 in)
- Propulsion: 4 IHI/General Electric LM2500-30 gas turbines; Two shafts 5-bladed CP props; 68,010 shp (50,720 kW)
- Speed: 30 knots (56 km/h)
- Boats & landing craft carried: 1 working boat; 1 Rigid hull inflatable boat
- Complement: 300
- Sensors & processing systems: AN/SPY-1D(V) passive electronically scanned array radar; AN/SPQ-9 surface search radar; 3 × Mk.99 mod.8 FCS; AN/SQQ-89; Mk 160 FCS; Mk 116 FCS
- Armament: 1 × 5-inch (127mm/L62) Mk-45 Mod 4 naval gun in a stealth-shaped mount. (Made by Japan Steel Works licensed from its original manufacturer); 2 × missile canister up to 8 Type 17; 2 × 20 mm Phalanx CIWS; 2 × Type 68 triple torpedo tubes (6 × Mk-46 or Type 73 torpedoes); 96-cell Mk-41 VLS: (64 at the bow / 32 cells at the stern aft) for a mix of: SM-2MR Standard Missile; SM-3 Anti-Ballistic Missile; SM-6 Standard Missile; Type 07 VL-ASROC; RIM-162 Evolved Sea Sparrow
- Aircraft carried: 1 × SH-60K helicopter
- Aviation facilities: Flight deck and enclosed hangar for one helicopter

JS Haguro (DDG-180) is the second Maya-class guided missile destroyer in the Japan Maritime Self-Defense Force (JMSDF). She was named after Mount Haguro, one of Three Mountains of Dewa in Yamagata Prefecture.

== Operational history ==
Haguro participated in the 2022 Pacific Dragon exercise. On 16 November 2022, the guided-missile destroyer Maya fired an SM-3 Block IIA missile, successfully intercepting the target outside the atmosphere in the first launch of the missile from a Japanese warship. On 18 November 2022, the Haguro likewise fired an SM-3 Block IB missile with a successful hit outside the atmosphere. Both test firings were conducted at the Pacific Missile Range Facility on Kauaʻi Island, Hawaii, in cooperation with the U.S. Navy and U.S. Missile Defense Agency. This was the first time the two ships conducted SM-3 firings in the same time period, and the tests validated the ballistic missile defense capabilities of Japan's newest Maya-class destroyers.
