= JS Yoshii =

Mogami-class frigate

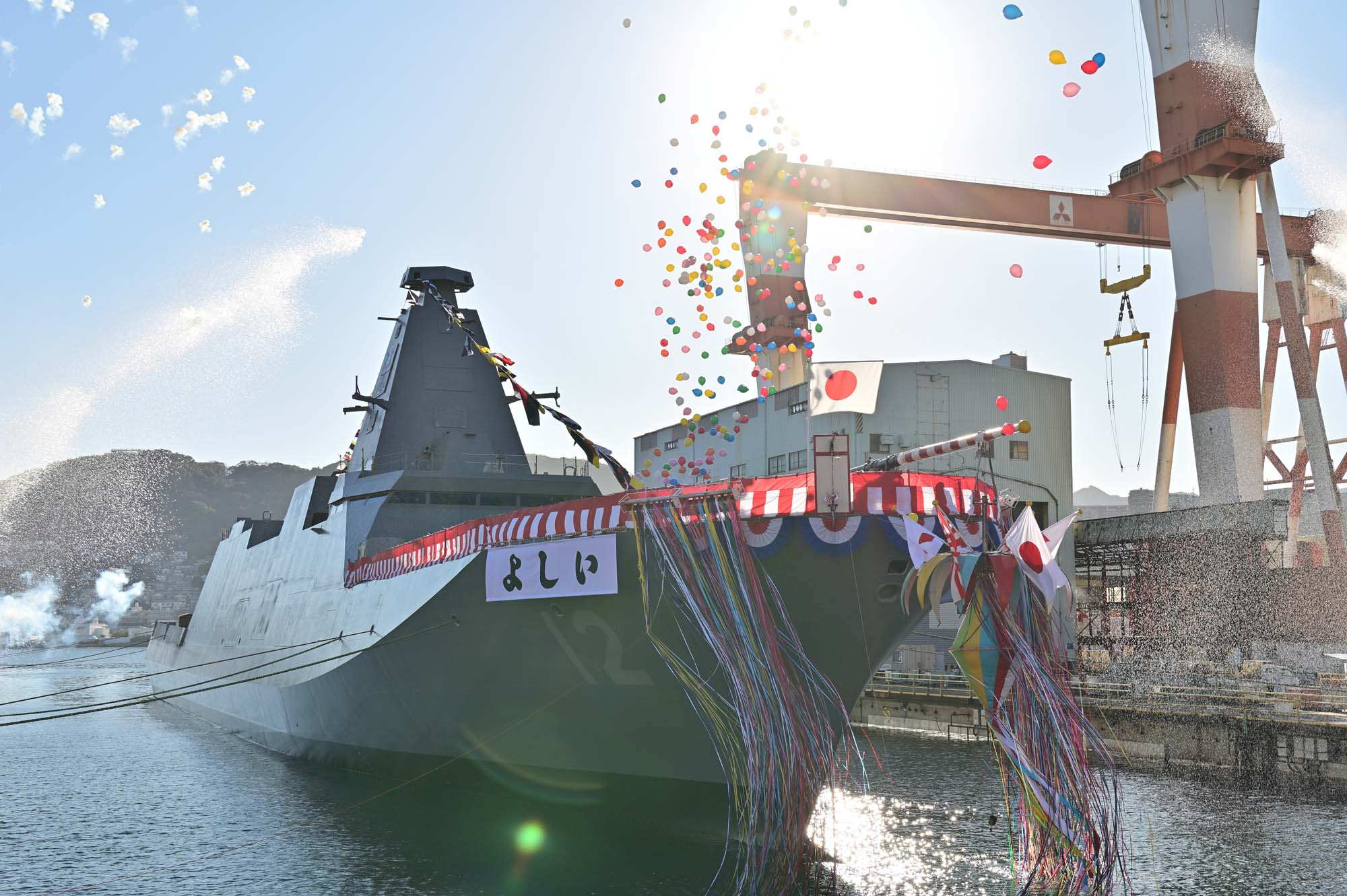
- Yoshii during her launch ceremony

History

Japan
- Name: Yoshii
- Namesake: Yoshii River
- Builder: Mitsubishi Heavy Industries Nagasaki Shipyard
- Cost: Approximately 46 to 47 billion yen
- Laid down: 3 July 2024
- Launched: 22 December 2025
- Commissioned: Fiscal year 2026 (scheduled)
- Identification: FFM-12
- Status: Fitting out

General characteristics
- Class & type: Mogami-class frigate
- Displacement: 3,900 t (3,800 long tons; 4,300 short tons) (standard); 5,500 t (5,400 long tons; 6,100 short tons) (full load)
- Length: 132.5 m (434 ft 9 in)
- Beam: 16.3 m (53 ft 6 in)
- Draft: 9 m (29 ft 6 in)
- Propulsion: CODAG; 1 × Rolls-Royce MT30 gas turbine; 2 × MAN Diesel V28/33DD STC engine; 2 × shafts
- Speed: 30 knots (56 km/h; 35 mph)
- Boats & landing craft carried: 2 × RHIB, UUV, USV
- Crew: 90-100
- Sensors & processing systems: OPY-2 (X-band multi-purpose AESA radar); OAX-3(EO/IR); OQQ-25 (VDS + TASS); OQQ-11 (Mine-hunting sonar); OYQ-1 (Combat management system); OYX-1-29 (Console display system)
- Electronic warfare & decoys: NOLQ-3E (Passive radar system + Electronic attack capability is integrated into the main radar antenna), Chaff dispenser
- Armament: 1 × 5 in (127 mm) Mk-45 Mod 4 naval gun; 2 × missile canisters for a total of 8 Type 17 anti-ship missiles; 1 × SeaRAM; Type 12 torpedoes; Simplified mine laying equipment; 2 × Mk-41 VLS (16 cells total); Naval version of Type 03 Chū-SAM; 2 × Remote weapon station
- Aircraft carried: 1 × SH-60K patrol helicopter

JS Yoshii (Japanese: よしい; Hull Number: FFM-12) is the 12th and last ship of the Mogami-class frigates of the Japan Maritime Self-Defense Force. She is named after the Yoshii River in the Okayama Prefecture, a name that had not been previously used by the Imperial Japanese Navy.

== Construction and career ==
Yoshii was laid down in July 2024, at the same time as her sister ship Tatsuta. The ship was launched at Mitsubishi Heavy Industries' Nagasaki Shipyard on 22 December 2025, with Minister of Defense Shinjiro Koizumi attending the ceremony. The combined construction cost for both Yoshii and Tatsuta was approximately 116.6 billion yen. Yoshii is scheduled to be commissioned in the fiscal year 2026.
