= JS Agano =

Mogami-class frigate

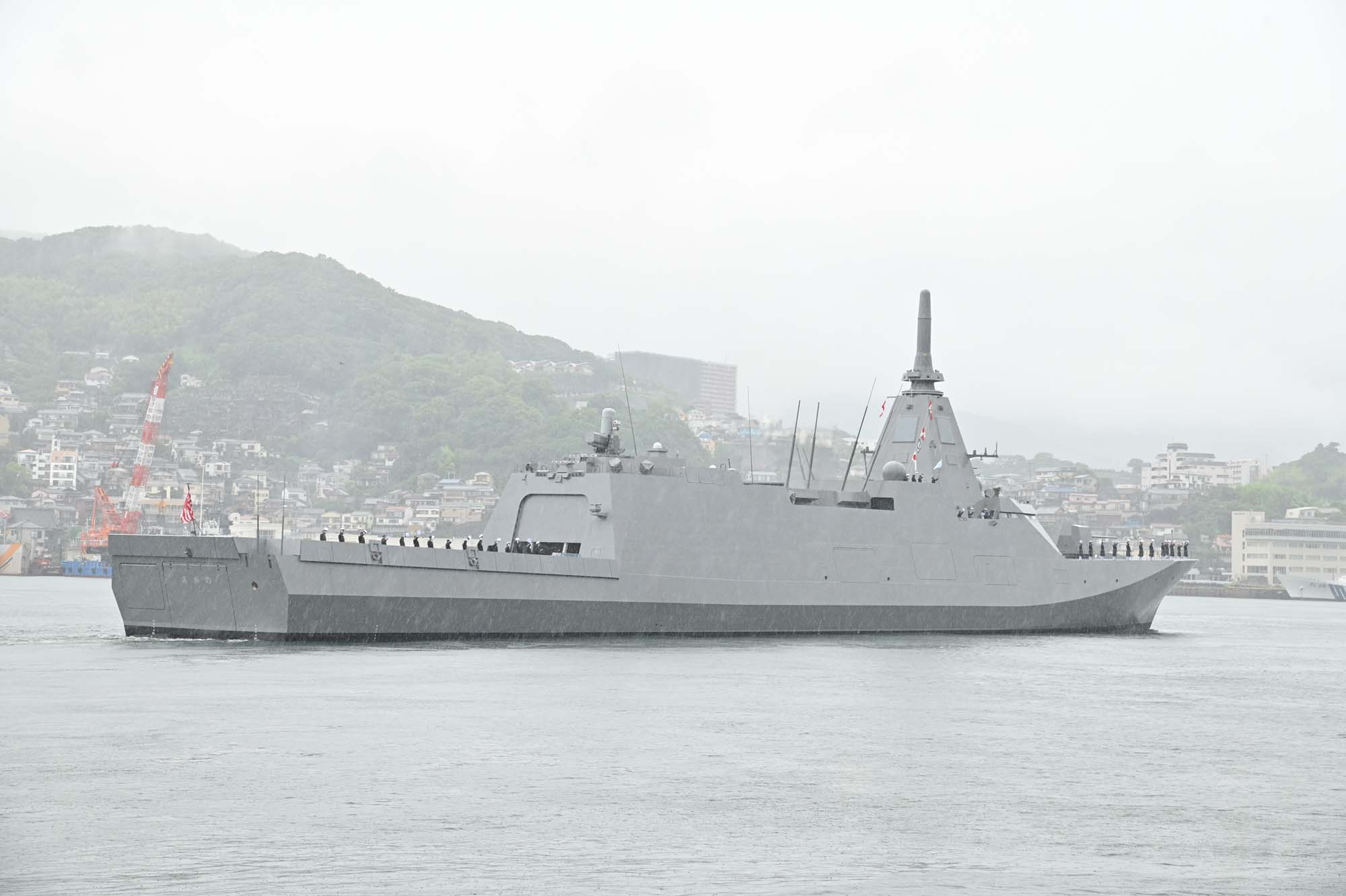
- Agano leaving MHI Nagasaki shipyard after commissioning

History

Japan
- Name: Agano
- Namesake: Agano River
- Ordered: 2020
- Builder: Mitsubishi Heavy Industries, Nagasaki
- Laid down: 24 June 2021
- Launched: 21 December 2022
- Commissioned: 20 June 2024
- Home port: Maizuru
- Identification: Pennant number: FFM-6
- Status: Active

General characteristics
- Class & type: Mogami-class frigate
- Displacement: 3,900 tons standard; 5,500 tons full load
- Length: 133 m (436 ft 4 in)
- Beam: 16.3 m (53 ft 6 in)
- Draft: 9 m (29 ft 6 in)
- Propulsion: CODAG; 1 × Rolls-Royce MT30 gas turbine; 2 × MAN Diesel V28/33DD STC engine
- Speed: 30 knots (56 km/h; 35 mph)
- Boats & landing craft carried: 2 × RHIB, UUV, USV
- Crew: 90-100
- Sensors & processing systems: OPY-2 (X-band multi-purpose AESA radar); OAX-3(EO/IR); OQQ-25 (VDS + TASS); OQQ-11 (Mine-hunting sonar); OYQ-1 (Combat management system); OYX-1-29 (Console display system)
- Electronic warfare & decoys: NOLQ-3E (Passive radar system + Electronic attack capability is integrated into the main radar antenna), Chaff dispenser
- Armament: 1 × 5 in (127 mm) Mk-45 Mod 4 naval gun; 2 × missile canisters for a total of 8 Type 17 anti-ship missiles; 1 × SeaRAM; Type 12 torpedoes; Simplified mine laying equipment; 2 × Mk-41 VLS (16 cells total); Naval version of Type 03 Chū-SAM; 2 × Remote weapon station
- Aircraft carried: 1 × SH-60L helicopter

Agano (あがの) is a frigate of the Japan Maritime Self-Defense Force, and the sixth ship of the Mogami class. Her namesake comes from the Agano River, which flows through Fukushima and Niigata Prefectures and into the Sea of Japan.

She is the second ship to be named after the Agano River, after the name ship of the Agano-class cruisers of the Imperial Japanese Navy, but she is the first JMSDF ship to be named so.

== History ==
Agano was ordered in the fiscal year 2020, based on the Mid-Term Defense Program, with her keel being laid down at the Nagasaki Shipyard of the Mitsubishi Heavy Industries on the 24 June 2021, and launched on the 21 December 2022 after being christened. After being fitted out and underwent sea trials, Agano was commissioned on 20 June 2024, (Note: The delivery was originally scheduled for March 2024, but was postponed.) assigned to the Fleet Escort Force 14th Escort Division of Maizuru.

== Gallery ==
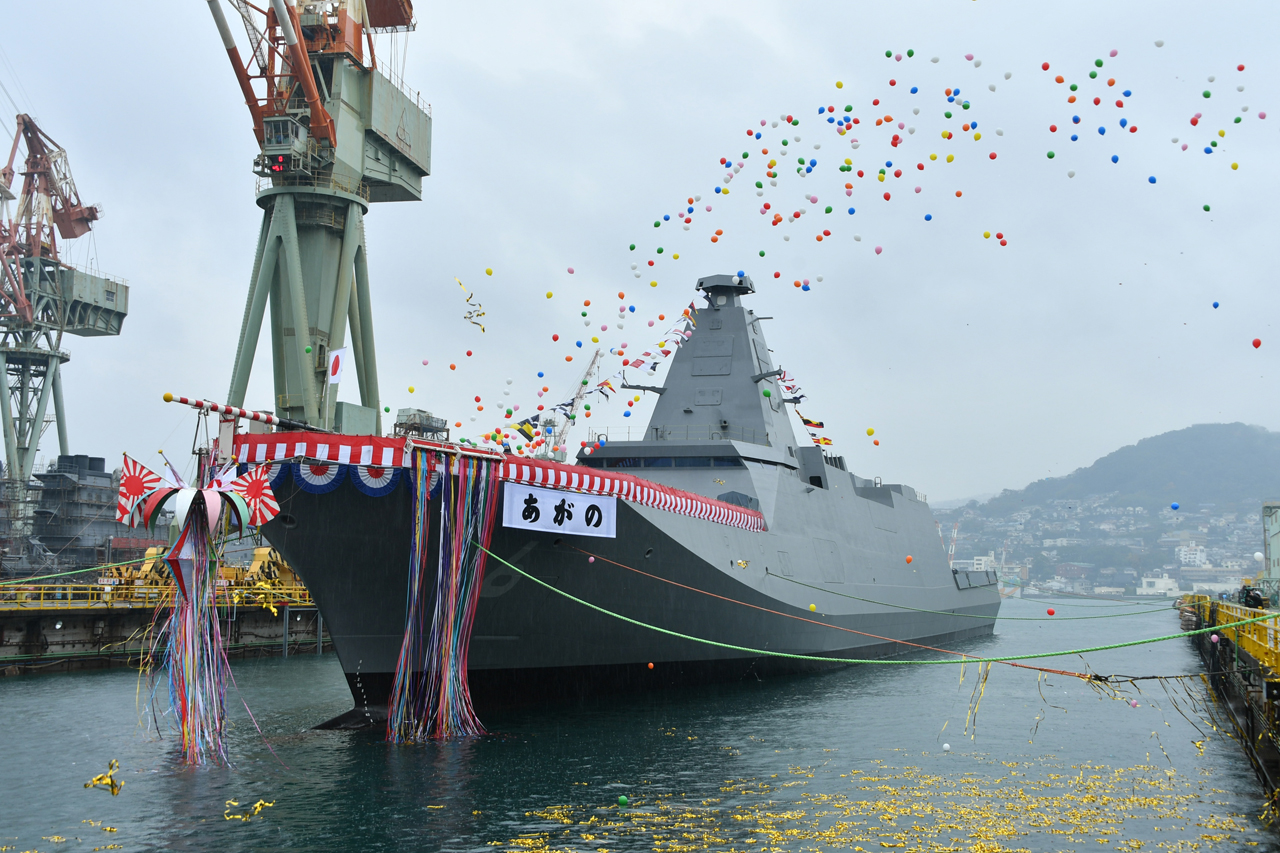
Agano during her launch ceremony

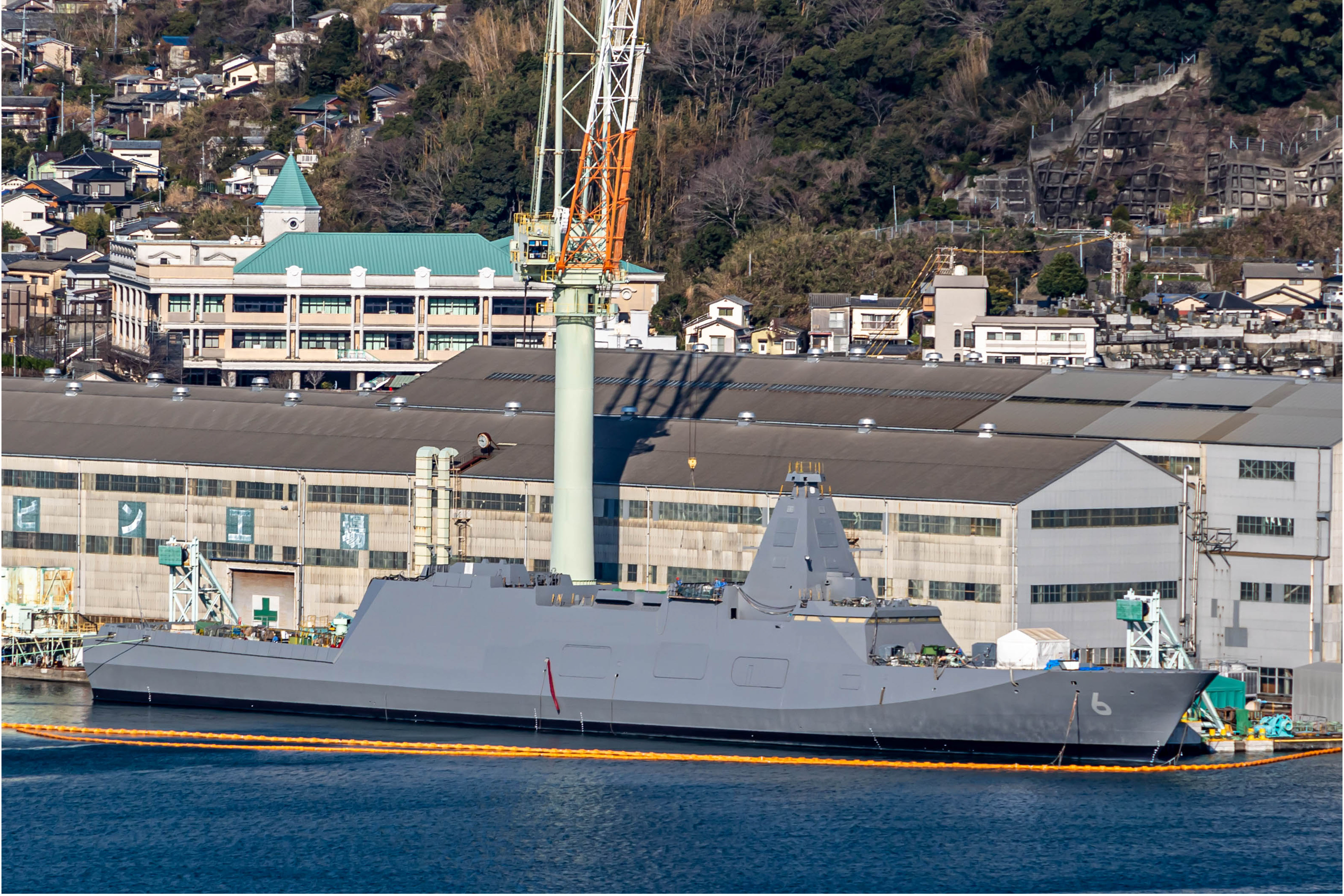
Agano being fitted out at MHI Nagasaki Shipyard

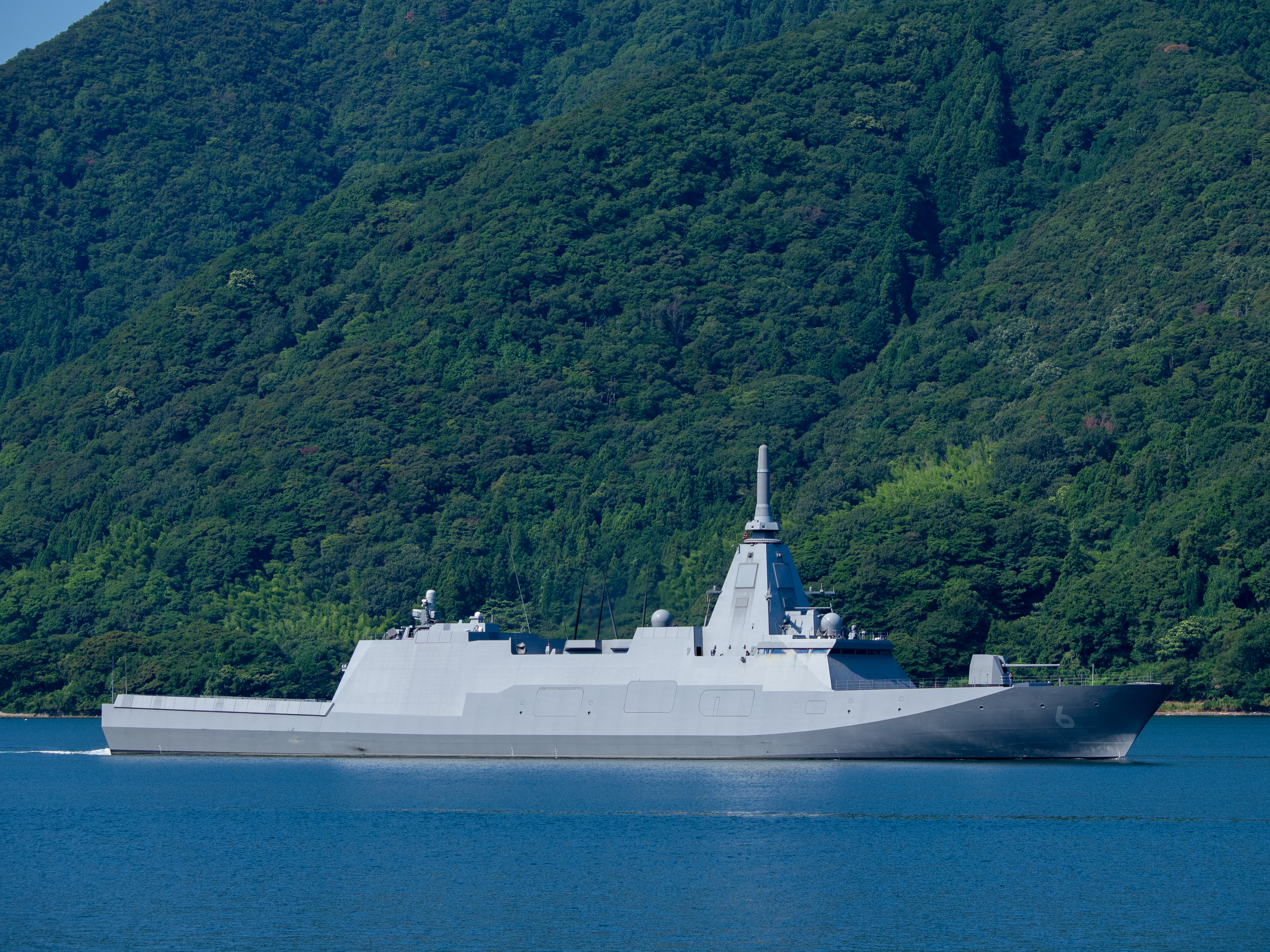
Agano underway, 29 July 2025
