= Japanese ship Noshiro =

Three Japanese warships have been named Noshiro:

- Japanese cruiser Noshiro, an Agano-class cruiser launched in 1942 and sunk in 1944
- JDS Noshiro, a Chikugo-class destroyer escort launched in 1976 and stricken in 2003
- JS Noshiro, a Mogami-class frigate launched in 2021.
