= JS Yahagi =

Japanese Mogami-class frigate

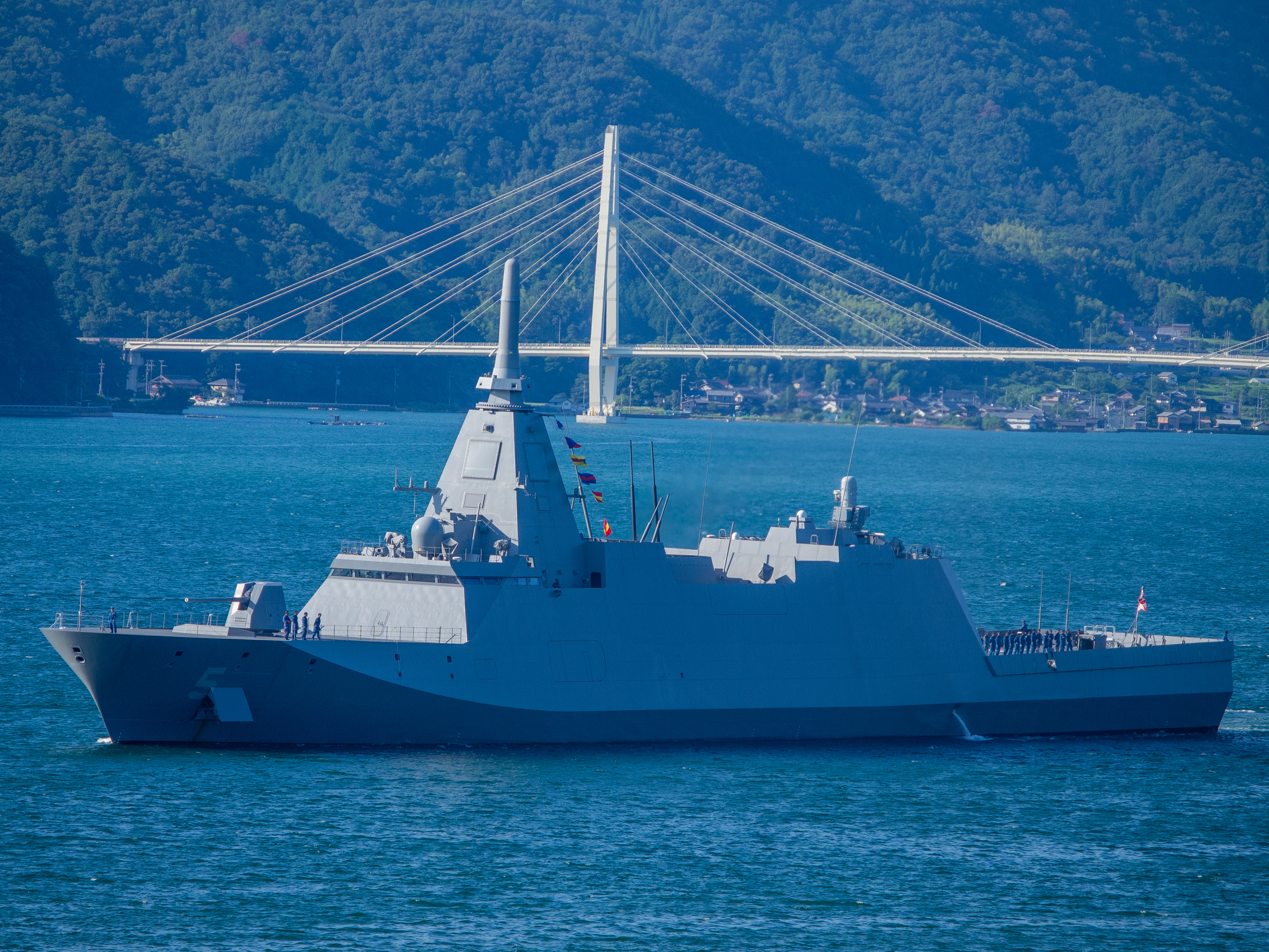
- JS Yahagi

History

Japan
- Name: Yahagi
- Namesake: Yahagi River
- Builder: Mitsubishi Heavy Industries, Nagasaki
- Laid down: 24 June 2021
- Launched: 23 June 2022
- Commissioned: 21 May 2024
- Home port: Maizuru
- Identification: Pennant number: FFM-5
- Status: Active

General characteristics
- Class & type: Mogami-class frigate
- Displacement: 3,900 tons standard; 5,500 tons full load
- Length: 133 m (436 ft 4 in)
- Beam: 16.3 m (53 ft 6 in)
- Draft: 9 m (29 ft 6 in)
- Propulsion: CODAG; 1 × Rolls-Royce MT30 gas turbine; 2 × MAN Diesel V28/33DD STC engine
- Speed: 30 knots (56 km/h; 35 mph)
- Boats & landing craft carried: 2 × RHIB, UUV, USV
- Crew: 90
- Sensors & processing systems: OPY-2 (X-band multi-purpose AESA radar); OAX-3(EO/IR); OQQ-25 (VDS + TASS); OQQ-11 (Mine-hunting sonar); OYQ-1 (Combat management system); OYX-1-29 (Console display system)
- Electronic warfare & decoys: NOLQ-3E (Passive radar system + Electronic attack capability is integrated into the main radar antenna), Chaff dispenser
- Armament: 1 × 5 in (127 mm) Mk-45 Mod 4 naval gun; 2 × missile canisters for a total of 8 Type 17 anti-ship missiles; 1 × SeaRAM; Type 12 torpedoes; Simplified mine laying equipment; 2 × Mk-41 VLS (16 cells total); Naval version of Type 03 Chū-SAM; 2 × Remote weapon station
- Aircraft carried: 1 × SH-60L helicopter

Yahagi (やはぎ) is a frigate of the Japan Maritime Self-Defense Force, and the fifth ship of the Mogami class. Her namesake comes from the Yahagi River, which flows through Nagano, Gifu, and Aichi prefectures, a name that was chosen by Defense Minister Nobuo Kishi after a competition within the Maritime Self-Defense Forces.

She is the third Japanese warship to bear this name, following the former Imperial Japanese Navy's Chikuma-class cruiser Yahagi of 1911, and the Agano-class cruiser Yahagi of 1942, though the kanji characters are different, as the former Imperial Japanese Navy's Yahagi was named after the old name of the Yahagi River.

== History ==
Yahagi was ordered in the fiscal year 2020, based on the Mid-Term Defense Program, with her keel being laid down at Mitsubishi Heavy Industries Nagasaki Shipyard on 24 June 2021, and was launched on 23 June 2022. After undergoing fitting out and sea trials, the ship was commissioned on 21 May 2024, (Note: The delivery was originally scheduled for December 2023, but was postponed due to delays in the delivery of government-supplied goods.) assigned to the Escort Fleet 14th Escort Division of Maizuru.

The Mogami-class frigates were designed to be multi-functional in various roles, to address the growing peacetime surveillance and monitoring activities around Japan, including anti-submarine, anti-aircraft, surface, and mine warfare.

Yahagi made a port call at Darwin on 5 June 2025 for comparison against the German MEKO A-200 design as part of the Australian general purpose frigate program.

== Gallery ==
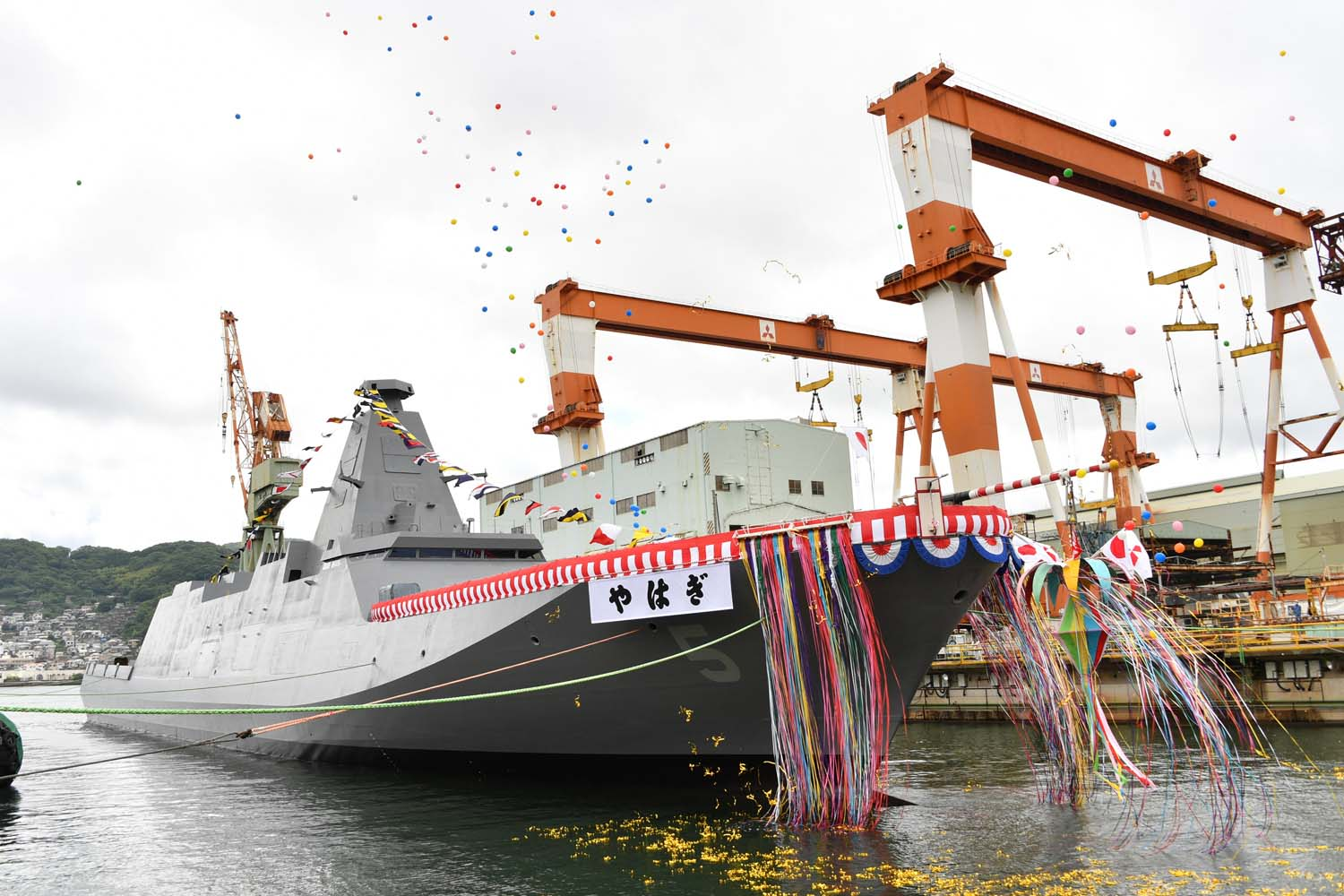
Launch ceremony of Yahagi

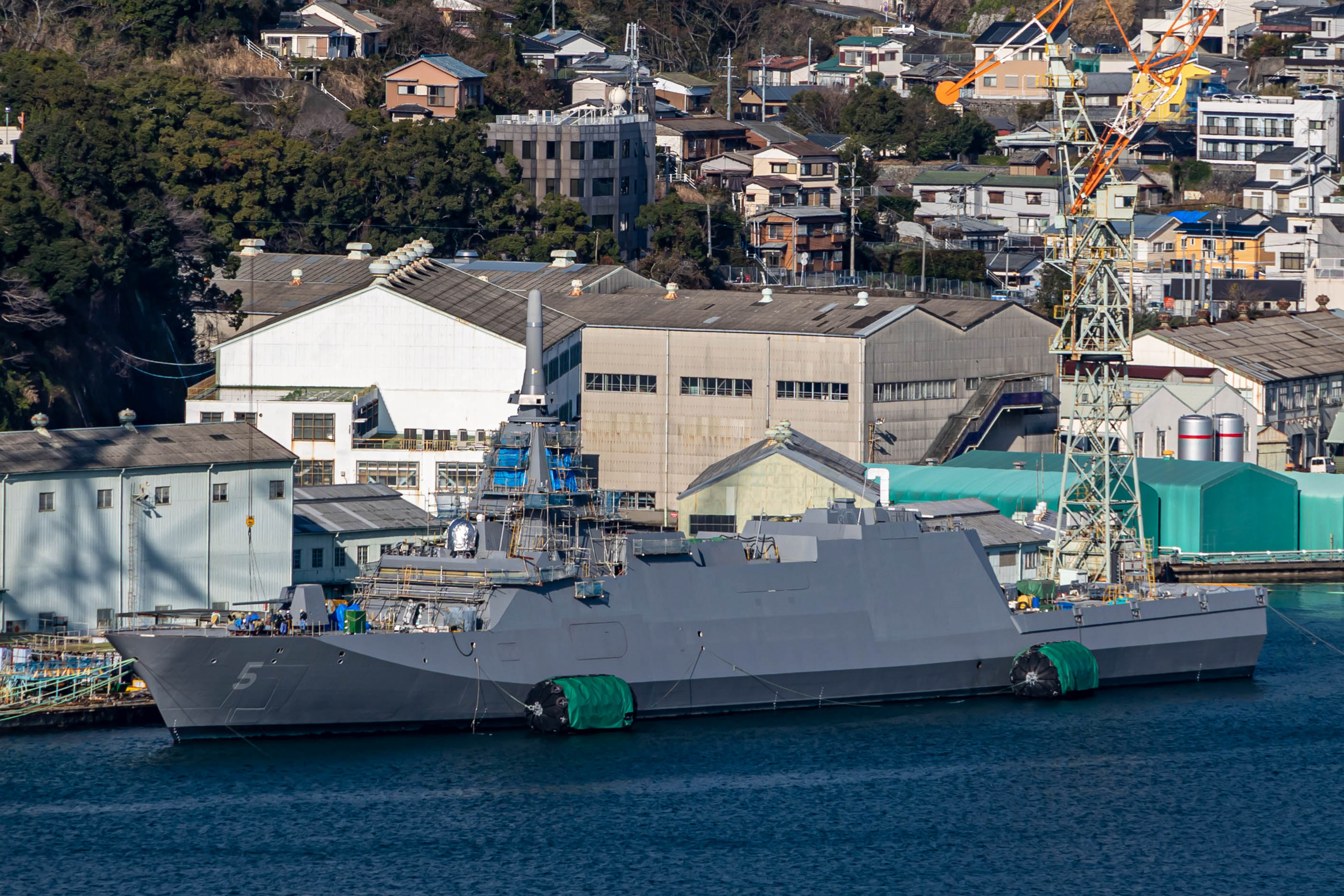
Yahagi being fitted out at Mitsubishi Heavy Industries Nagasaki Shipyard

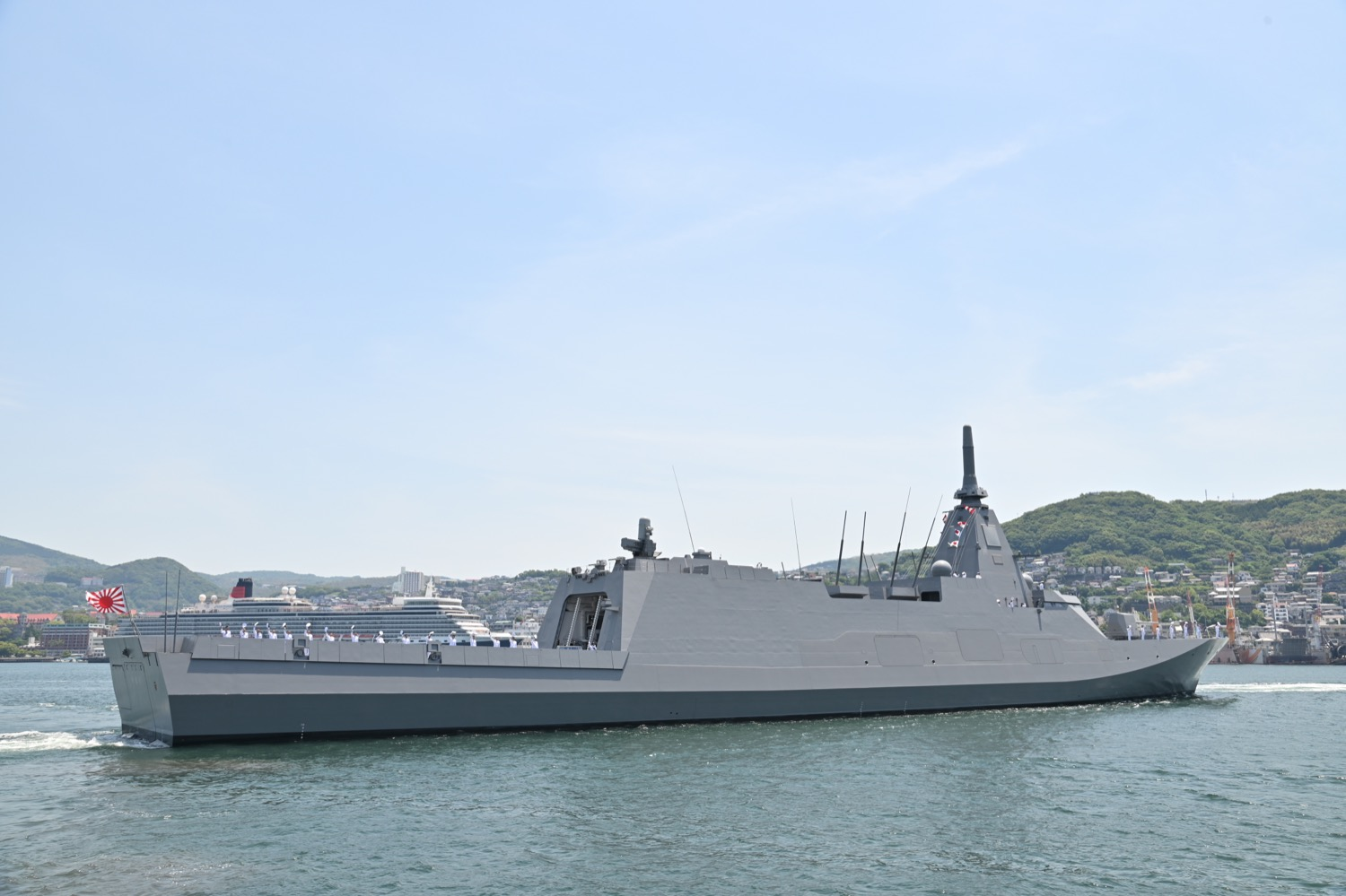
Yahagi leaving Nagasaki Shipyard upon being commissioned

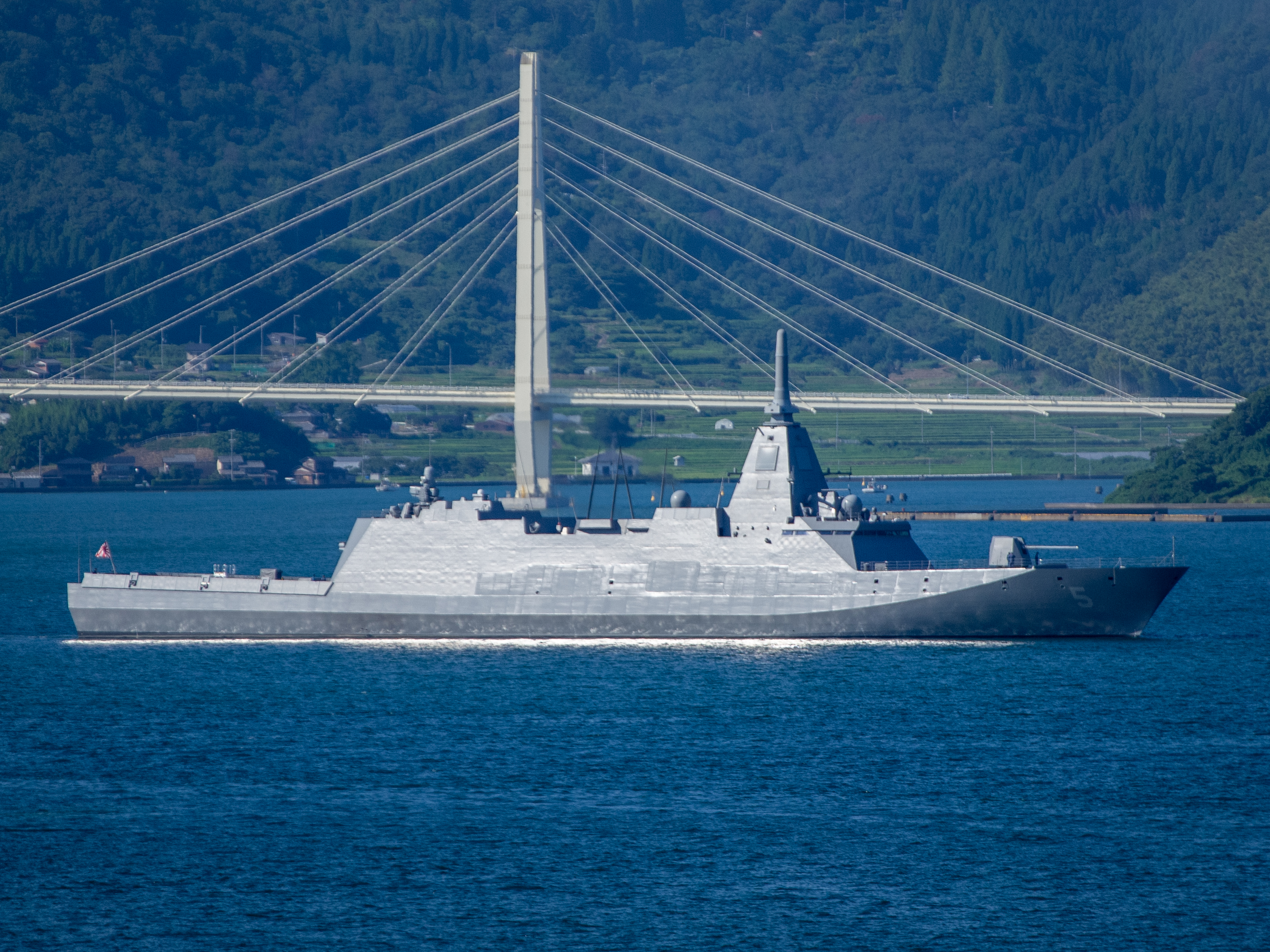
Yahagi with the Maizuru Crane Bridge in the background
