= JS Natori =

Mogami-class frigate

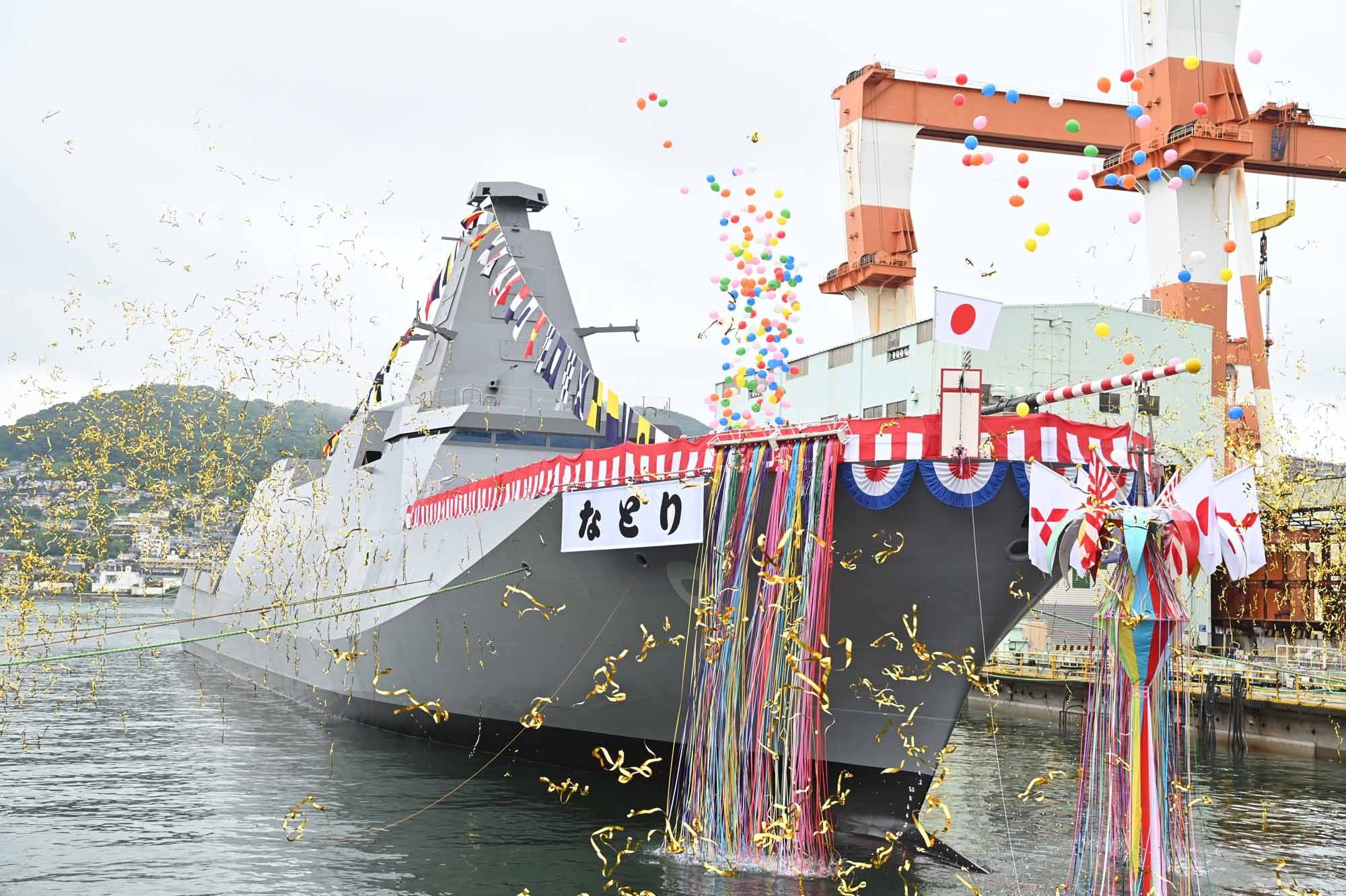
- Launch ceremony of the Natori

History

Japan
- Name: Natori
- Namesake: Natori River
- Builder: Mitsubishi Heavy Industries, Nagasaki
- Cost: Approximately 54.1 billion yen
- Laid down: 6 July 2023
- Launched: 24 June 2024
- Commissioned: 21 May 2026
- Home port: Ōminato
- Identification: Pennant number: FFM-9
- Status: In service

General characteristics
- Class & type: Mogami-class frigate
- Displacement: 3,900 t (3,800 long tons; 4,300 short tons) (standard); 5,500 t (5,400 long tons; 6,100 short tons) (full load)
- Length: 132.5 m (434 ft 9 in)
- Beam: 16.3 m (53 ft 6 in)
- Draft: 9 m (29 ft 6 in)
- Propulsion: CODAG; 1 × Rolls-Royce MT30 gas turbine; 2 × MAN Diesel V28/33DD STC engine
- Speed: more than 30 knots (56 km/h; 35 mph)
- Boats & landing craft carried: 2 × RHIB, UUV, USV
- Crew: around 90
- Sensors & processing systems: OPY-2 (X-band multi-purpose AESA radar); OAX-3(EO/IR); OQQ-25 (VDS + TASS); OQQ-11 (Mine-hunting sonar); OYQ-1 (Combat management system); OYX-1-29 (Console display system)
- Electronic warfare & decoys: NOLQ-3E (Passive radar system + Electronic attack capability is integrated into the main radar antenna), Chaff dispenser
- Armament: 1 × 5 in (127 mm) Mk-45 Mod 4 naval gun; 2 × missile canisters for a total of 8 Type 17 anti-ship missiles; 1 × SeaRAM; Type 12 torpedoes; Simplified mine laying equipment; 2 × Mk-41 VLS (16 cells total); Naval version of Type 03 Chū-SAM; 2 × Remote weapon station

Natori (なとり) is a frigate of the Japan Maritime Self-Defense Force (JMSDF), and the ninth ship of the Mogami class. She is named after the Natori River, which flows through the cities of Natori and Sendai in the Miyagi Prefecture, and the second ship to be named this way, after the Imperial Japanese Navy's Nagara-class cruiser Natori, as well as the first in the JMSDF era.

== History ==
Natori was ordered in March 2023 by Mitsubishi Heavy Industries as part of the JMSDF's Mid-Term Defense Program and was laid down at the MHI Nagasaki Shipyard on 6 July 2023. She was christened and launched on 24 June 2024, and was commissioned on 21 May 2026 after a period of fitting out and subsequent sea trials.
