= JS Mogami =

Lead ship of the Japanese Mogami-class frigates

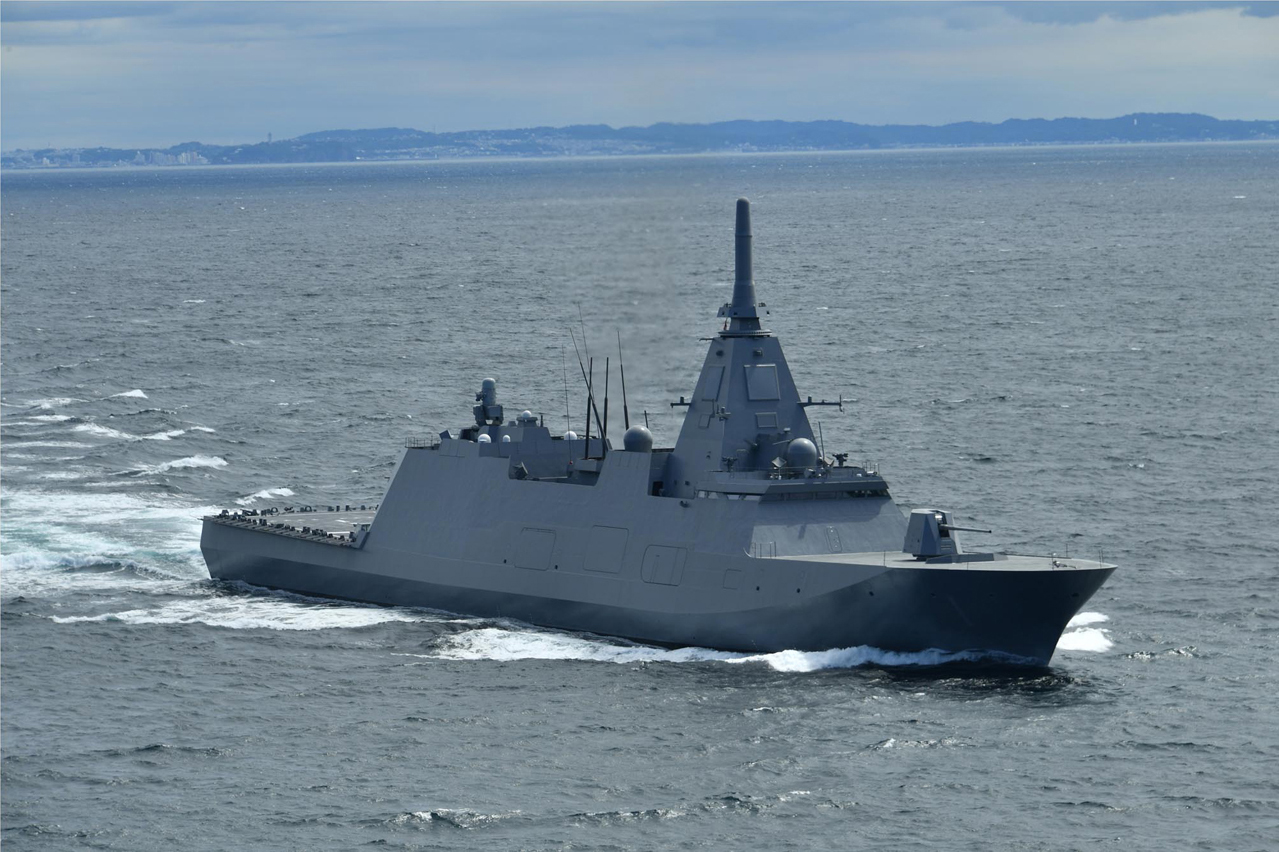

History

Japan
- Name: Mogami; (もがみ)
- Namesake: Mogami
- Ordered: 2018
- Builder: Mitsubishi, Nagasaki
- Laid down: 29 October 2019
- Launched: 3 March 2021
- Commissioned: 28 April 2022
- Identification: Pennant number: FFM-1
- Status: Active

General characteristics
- Class & type: Mogami-class frigate
- Displacement: 3,900 tons standard; 5,500 tons full load
- Length: 132 m (433 ft 1 in)
- Beam: 16 m (52 ft 6 in)
- Propulsion: CODAG; 1 × Rolls-Royce MT30 gas turbine; 2 × MAN Diesel V28/33DD STC engine
- Speed: over 30 knots (56 km/h; 35 mph)
- Boats & landing craft carried: 2 × RHIB, UUV, USV
- Crew: 90
- Sensors & processing systems: OPY-2 (X-band multi-purpose AESA radar); OAX-3(EO/IR); OQQ-25 (VDS + TASS); OQQ-11 (Mine-hunting sonar); OYQ-1 (Combat management system); OYX-1-29 (Console display system)
- Electronic warfare & decoys: NOLQ-3E (Passive radar system + Electronic attack capability is integrated into the main radar antenna), Chaff dispenser
- Armament: 1 × 5 in (127 mm) Mk-45 Mod 4 naval gun; 2 × missile canisters for a total of 8 Type 17 anti-ship missiles; 1 × SeaRAM; Type 12 torpedoes; Simplified mine laying equipment; 16 × Mk-41 VLS; Naval version of Type 03 Chū-SAM; 2 × Remote weapon station
- Aircraft carried: 1 × SH-60L helicopter
- Aviation facilities: Single hangar

JS Mogami (FFM-1) is the lead ship of the Mogami-class frigates of the Japan Maritime Self-Defense Force (JMSDF). She was named after the Mogami River and shares her name with a World War II heavy cruiser Mogami and Cold War destroyer escort Mogami.

== Development and design ==
In 2015 the Japanese defense budget allocated funds to study the construction of a new "compact-type hull destroyer with additional multi-functional capabilities" as well as a new radar system for the destroyer. In the same year Mitsubishi Heavy Industries (MHI) unveiled the frigate's first concept model (30FF) which they have been developing with their own funds.

The 30DX design has an overall length of 130 metres (426 ft 6 in), breadth of 16 metres (52 ft 6 in), a standard displacement of 3,900 tons with a full load displacement of about 5,500 tons, and a maximum speed of over 30 knots (56 km/h; 35 mph). Weapons include a Mk 45 gun, two remote weapon stations above the bridge, 16 Mk 41 VLS at the bow, eight anti-ship missiles, one SeaRAM, an SH-60L helicopter, torpedoes, and decoy launchers. It can also deploy and recover unmanned underwater vehicles (UUVs), unmanned surface vehicles (USVs), and sea mines from the rear ramp beneath the helideck. It is also expected to use a naval version of the Type 03 Chū-SAM.

== Construction and career ==
Mogami was laid down on 29 October 2019 at Mitsubishi Heavy Industries, Nagasaki and launched on 3 March 2021, four months behind schedule because of problems with the British MT30 gas turbines. She will be expected to be commissioned on 28 April 2022. She commissioned on 28 April 2022 and deployed to Yokosuka Naval Base. The ceremony was attended by Makoto Oniki, Vice Minister of Defense, Ryo Sakai, Chief of the Maritime Staff, and Atsuo Suzuki, Director General of the Defense Acquisition Agency. MHI's Naohiko Abe, Managing Executive Officer and General Manager of the Defense & Space Segment.

When JS Mogami was completed, it was not equipped with VLS, but the budget for VLS will be appropriated later and VLS will be installed.

== Gallery ==
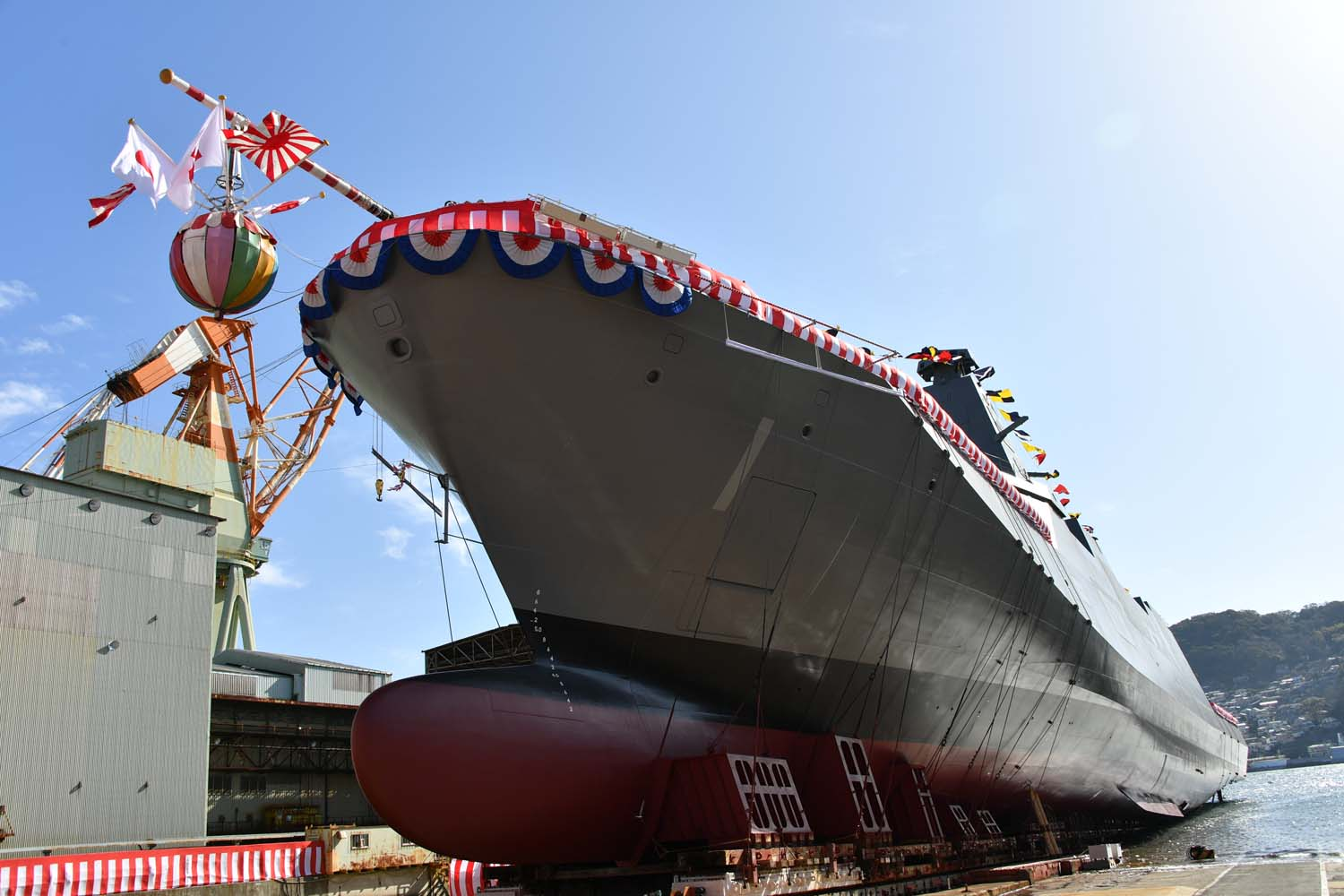

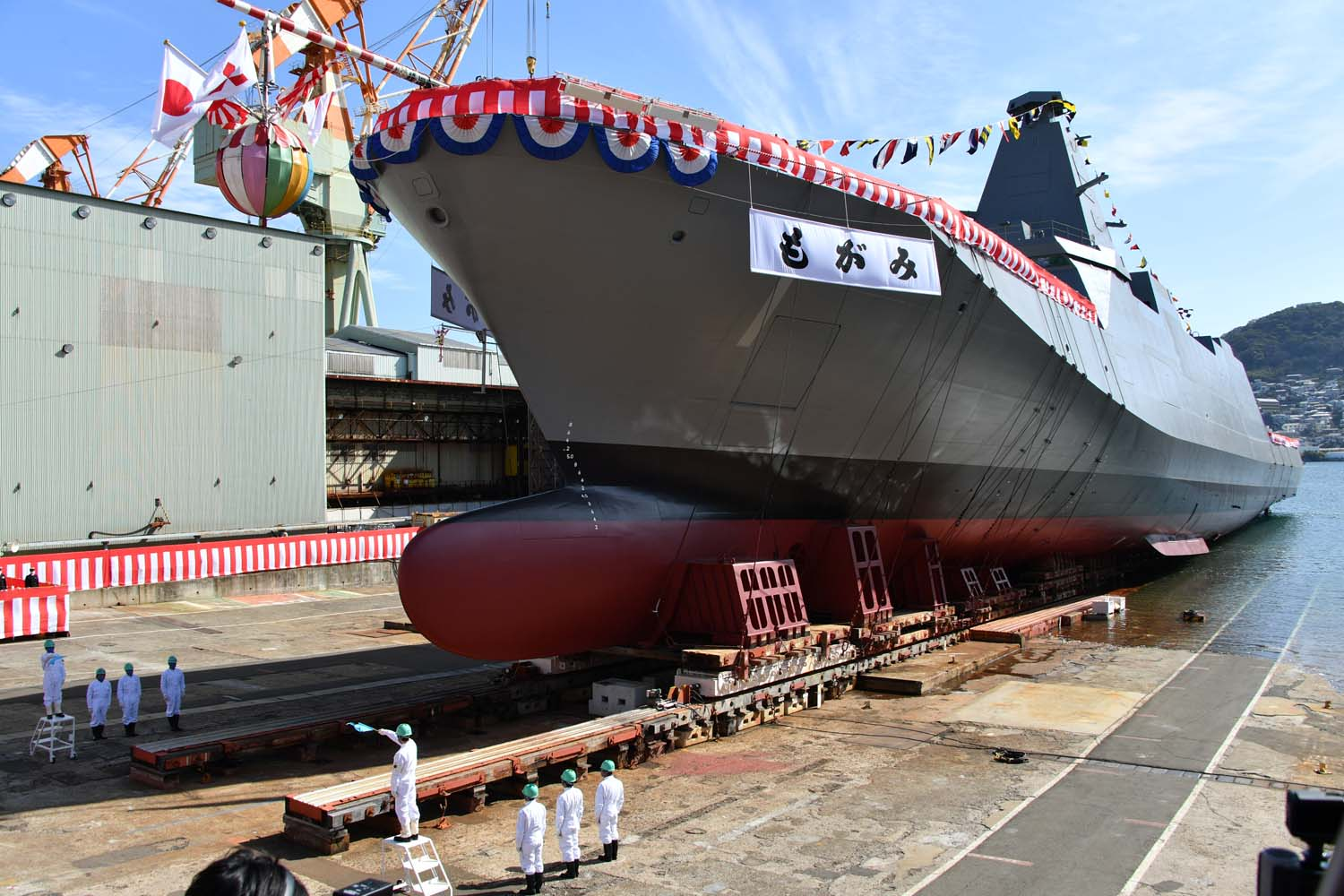

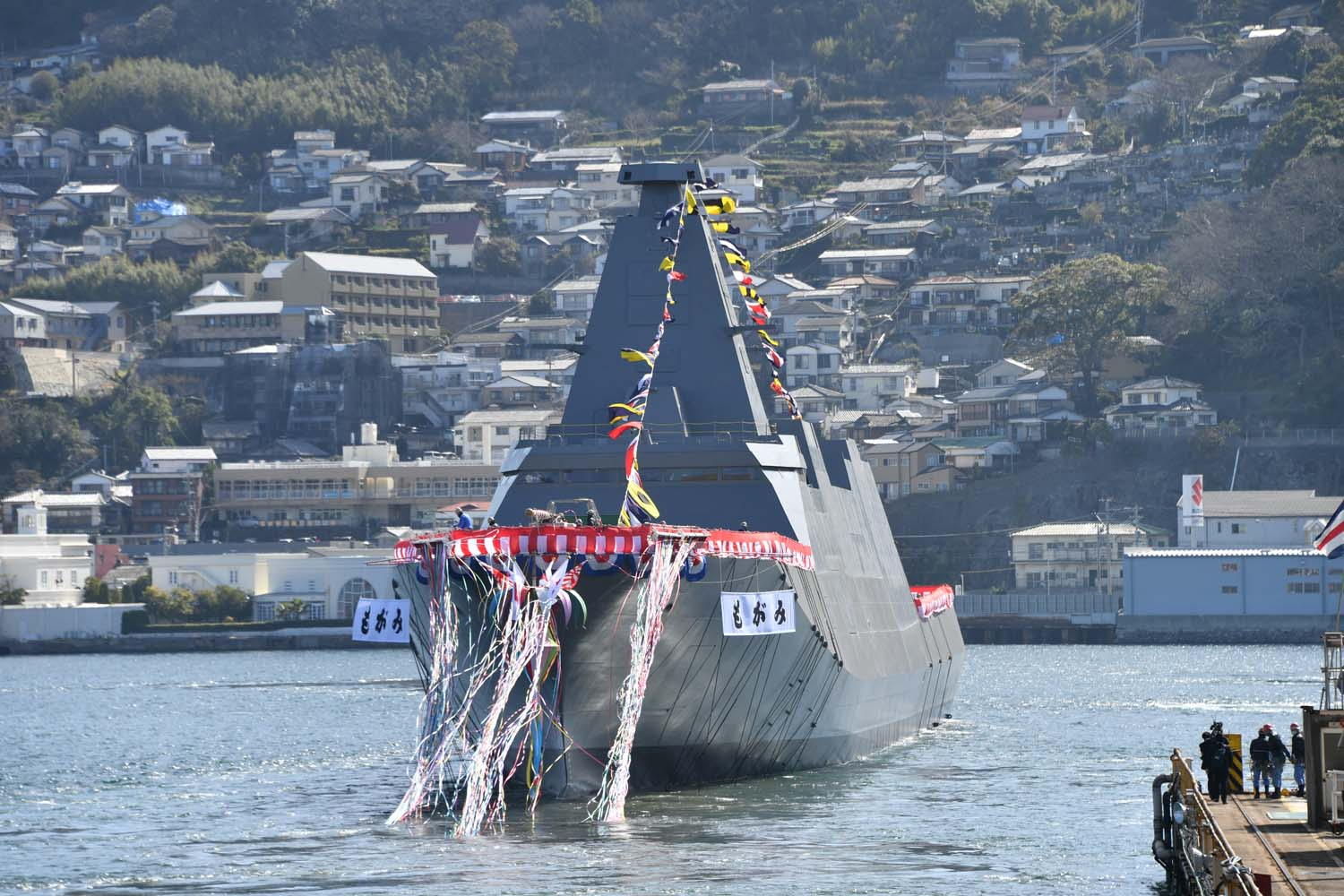

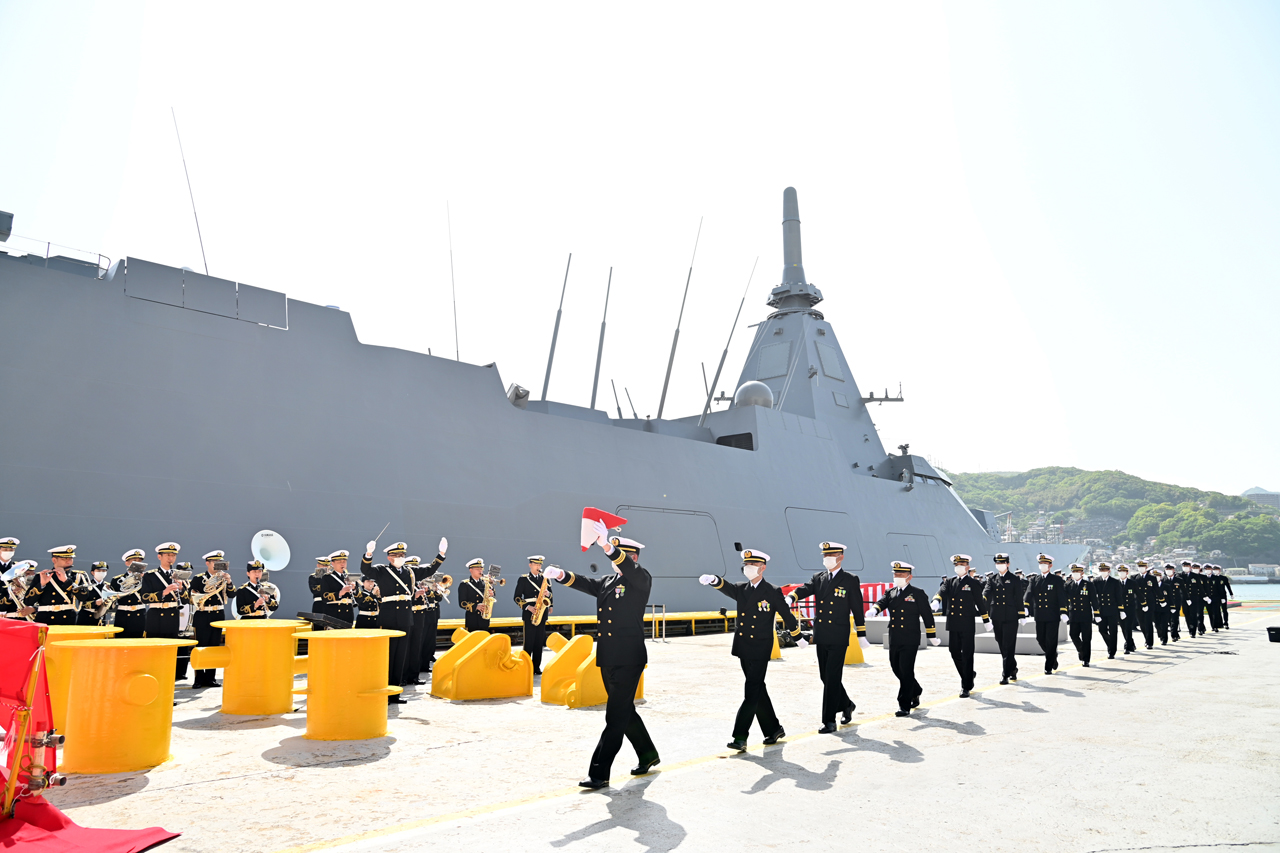

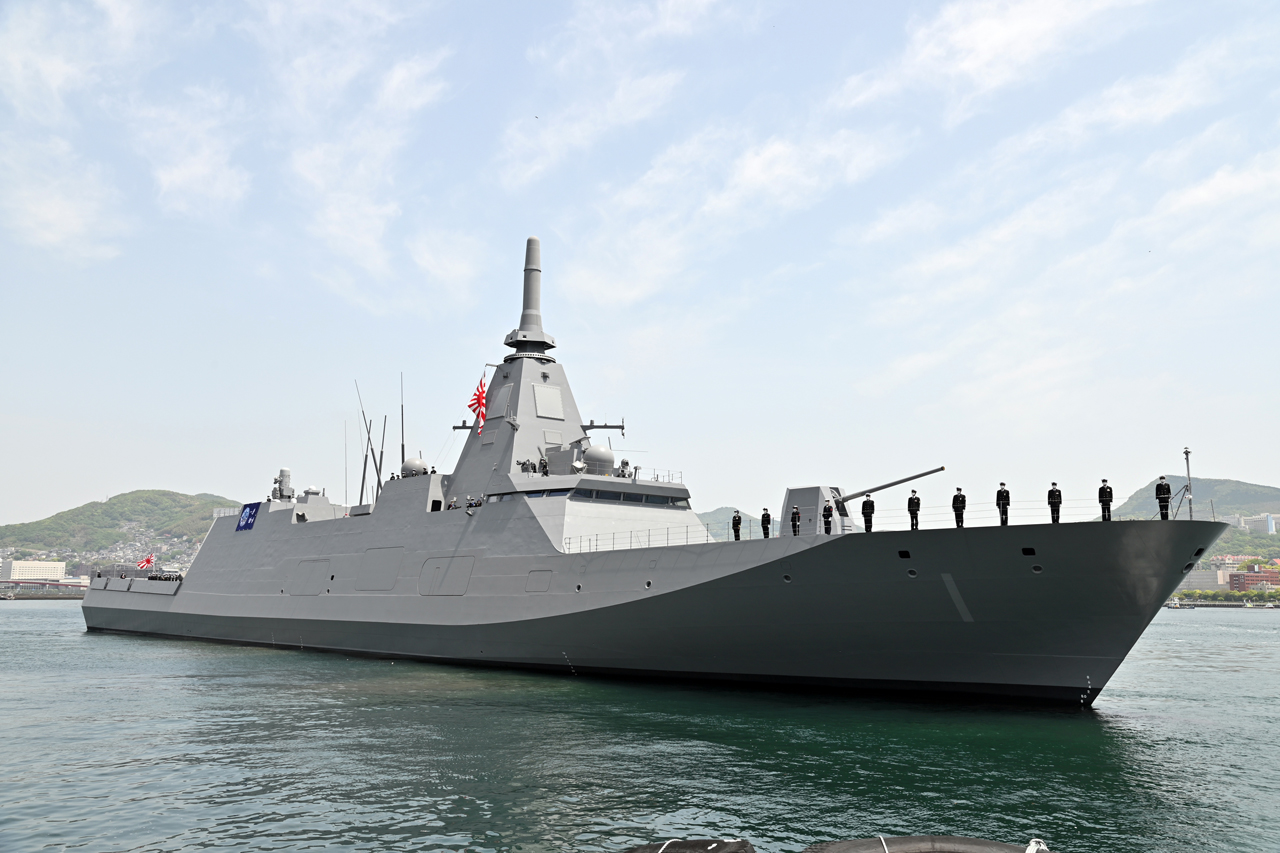
