= Japanese ship Mikuma =

Three warships of Japan have been named Mikuma:

- Japanese cruiser Mikuma, a Mogami-class cruiser launched in 1934 and sunk in 1942
- JDS Mikuma, a Chikugo-class destroyer escort launched in 1971 and stricken in 1997
- JS Mikuma, a Mogami-class frigate launched in 2021.
