= JS Niyodo =

Mogami-class frigate

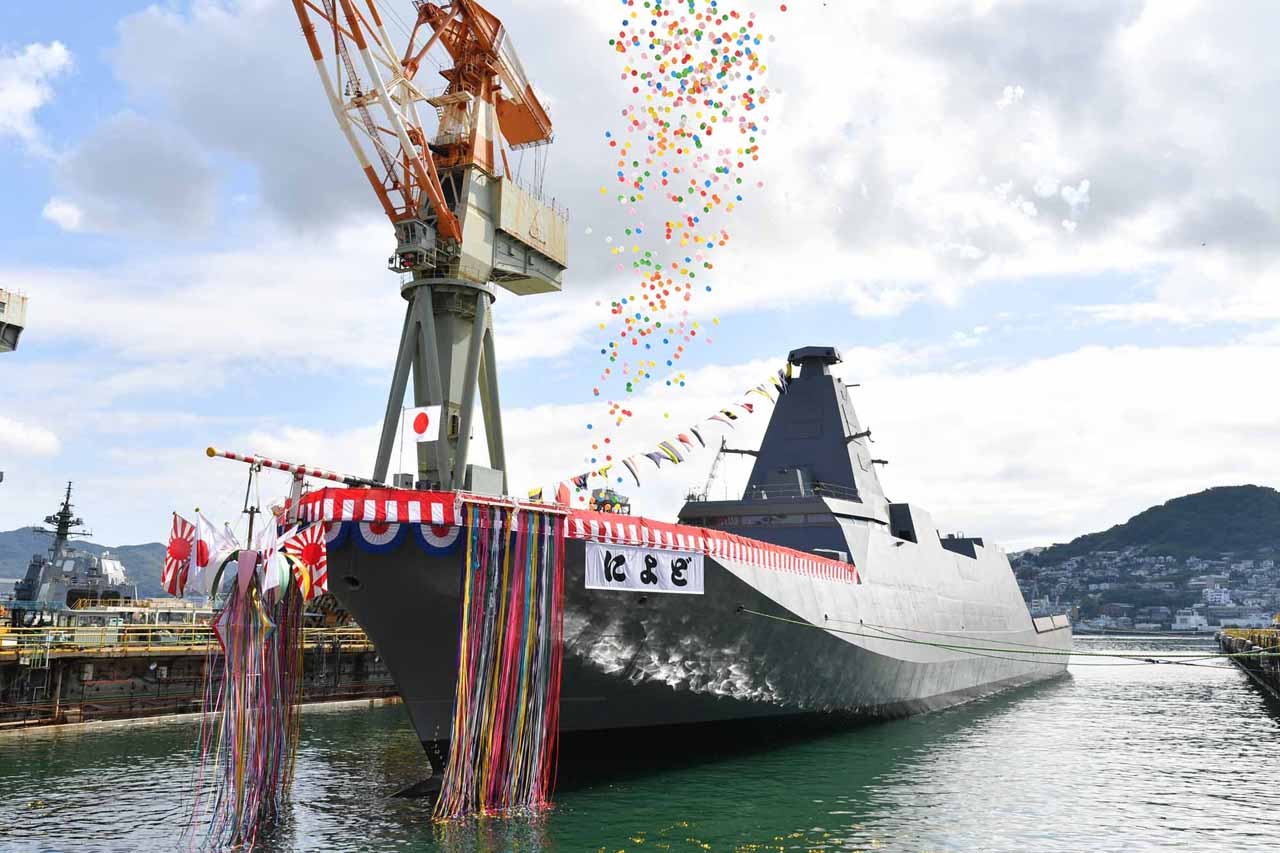
- Launch ceremony of the Niyodo

History

Japan
- Name: Niyodo
- Namesake: Niyodo River
- Builder: Mitsubishi Heavy Industries, Nagasaki
- Laid down: 30 June 2022
- Launched: 26 September 2023
- Commissioned: 21 May 2025
- Identification: Pennant number: FFM-7
- Status: Active

General characteristics
- Class & type: Mogami-class frigate
- Displacement: 3,900 tons standard; 5,500 tons full load
- Length: 132.5 m (434 ft 9 in)
- Beam: 16.3 m (53 ft 6 in)
- Draft: 9 m (29 ft 6 in)
- Propulsion: CODAG; 1 × Rolls-Royce MT30 gas turbine; 2 × MAN Diesel V28/33DD STC engine
- Speed: 30 knots (56 km/h; 35 mph)
- Boats & landing craft carried: 2 × RHIB, UUV, USV
- Crew: around 90
- Sensors & processing systems: OPY-2 (X-band multi-purpose AESA radar); OAX-3(EO/IR); OQQ-25 (VDS + TASS); OQQ-11 (Mine-hunting sonar); OYQ-1 (Combat management system); OYX-1-29 (Console display system)
- Electronic warfare & decoys: NOLQ-3E (Passive radar system + Electronic attack capability is integrated into the main radar antenna), Chaff dispenser
- Armament: 1 × 5 in (127 mm) Mk-45 Mod 4 naval gun; 2 × missile canisters for a total of 8 Type 17 anti-ship missiles; 1 × SeaRAM; Type 12 torpedoes; Simplified mine laying equipment; 2 × Mk-41 VLS (16 cells total) (Note: To be equipped later.); Naval version of Type 03 Chū-SAM; 2 × Remote weapon station
- Aircraft carried: 1 × SH-60L helicopter

Niyodo (によど) is a frigate of the Japan Maritime Self-Defense Force (JMSDF), and the seventh ship of the Mogami class. She was named after the Niyodo River, and the second ship to be named so, after the Chikugo-class destroyer escort JDS Niyodo. The Imperial Japanese Navy had plans to name the second Oyodo-class cruiser after the Niyodo River, but her construction was cancelled.

== Construction and career ==
Niyodo was ordered in March 2022 (for about 47.4 billion yen) by Mitsubishi Heavy Industries as part of the JMSDF's Mid-Term Defense Program and was laid down at MHI's Nagasaki Shipyard on 30 June 2022. She was named and launched on 26 September 2023. Although the Mk.41 VLS was included in the 2021 supplementary budget, it was decided that it will be fitted later due to the global semiconductor shortage. After fitting out and undergoing a series of sea trials, the ship was originally scheduled to be commissioned in December 2024. The schedule was later pushed back to 21 May 2025, and according to journalist Kosuke Takahashi, it is uncertain whether or not the delayed commissioning date allowed the Mark 41 VLS to be fitted, or a decision made by the JMSDF to equip the VLS during Niyodo's fitting out process. While Niyodo was eventually commissioned and assigned to the 12th Escort Fleet based at Kure, Takahashi disclosed a statement by the Public Relations Office of the Maritime Staff Office that the COVID-19 pandemic had also delayed the ship's entry to service.
