= JS Mikuma =

Japanese Mogami-class frigate

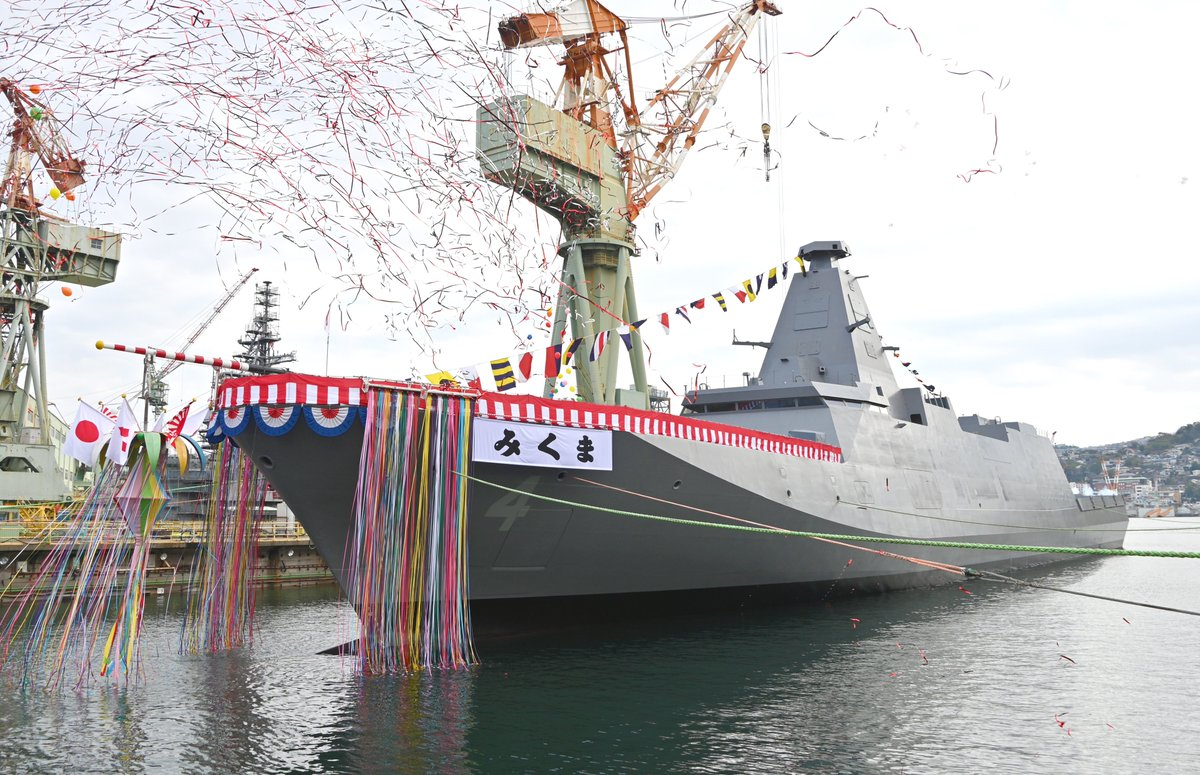
- JS Mikuma

History

Japan
- Name: Mikuma; (みくま)
- Namesake: Mikuma
- Ordered: 2020
- Builder: Mitsubishi, Nagasaki
- Laid down: 15 July 2020
- Launched: 10 December 2021
- Commissioned: 7 March 2023
- Identification: Pennant number: FFM-4
- Status: Active

General characteristics
- Class & type: Mogami-class frigate
- Displacement: 3,900 tons standard; 5,500 tons full load
- Length: 133 m (436 ft 4 in)
- Beam: 16 m (52 ft 6 in)
- Height: 9 m (29 ft 6 in)
- Propulsion: CODAG; 1 × Rolls-Royce MT30 gas turbine; 2 × MAN Diesel V28/33DD STC engine
- Speed: over 30 knots (56 km/h; 35 mph)
- Boats & landing craft carried: 2 × RHIB, UUV, USV
- Crew: 90
- Sensors & processing systems: OPY-2 (X-band multi-purpose AESA radar); OAX-3(EO/IR); OQQ-25 (VDS + TASS); OQQ-11 (Mine-hunting sonar); OYQ-1 (Combat management system); OYX-1-29 (Console display system)
- Electronic warfare & decoys: NOLQ-3E (Passive radar system + Electronic attack capability is integrated into the main radar antenna), Chaff dispenser
- Armament: 1 × 5 in (127 mm) Mk-45 Mod 4 naval gun; 2 × missile canisters for a total of 8 Type 17 anti-ship missiles; 1 × SeaRAM; Type 12 torpedoes; Simplified mine laying equipment; 16 × Mk-41 VLS; Naval version of Type 03 Chū-SAM; 2 × Remote weapon station
- Aircraft carried: 1 × SH-60L helicopter
- Aviation facilities: Single hangar

JS Mikuma (FFM-4) is the fourth ship of the Mogami-class frigates of the Japan Maritime Self-Defense Force (JMSDF). She was named after the Mikuma River and shares her name with a World War II heavy cruiser Mikuma and Cold War destroyer escort Mikuma.

== Development and design ==
In 2015 the Japanese defense budget allocated funds to study the construction of a new "compact-type hull destroyer with additional multi-functional capabilities" as well as a new radar system for the destroyer. In the same year Mitsubishi Heavy Industries (MHI) unveiled the frigate's first concept model (30FF) which they have been developing with their own funds.

The 30DX design has an overall length of 133 m, breadth of 16 m, a standard displacement of 3900 tons with a full load displacement of about 5500 tons, and a maximum speed of over 30 knots. Weapons include a Mk 45 gun, two remote weapon station above the bridge, 16 Mk 41 VLS at the bow, 8 anti-ship missiles, one SeaRAM, an SH-60L helicopter, torpedoes, and decoy launchers. It can also deploy and recover UUV, USV, and sea mines from the rear ramp beneath the helideck. It is also expected to use a naval version of the Type 03 Chū-SAM.

== Construction and career ==
Mikuma was laid down on 15 July 2020 at Mitsubishi Heavy Industries, Nagasaki and launched on 10 December 2021. She was commissioned in 7 March 2023.
