= JS Noshiro =

Japanese Mogami-class frigate

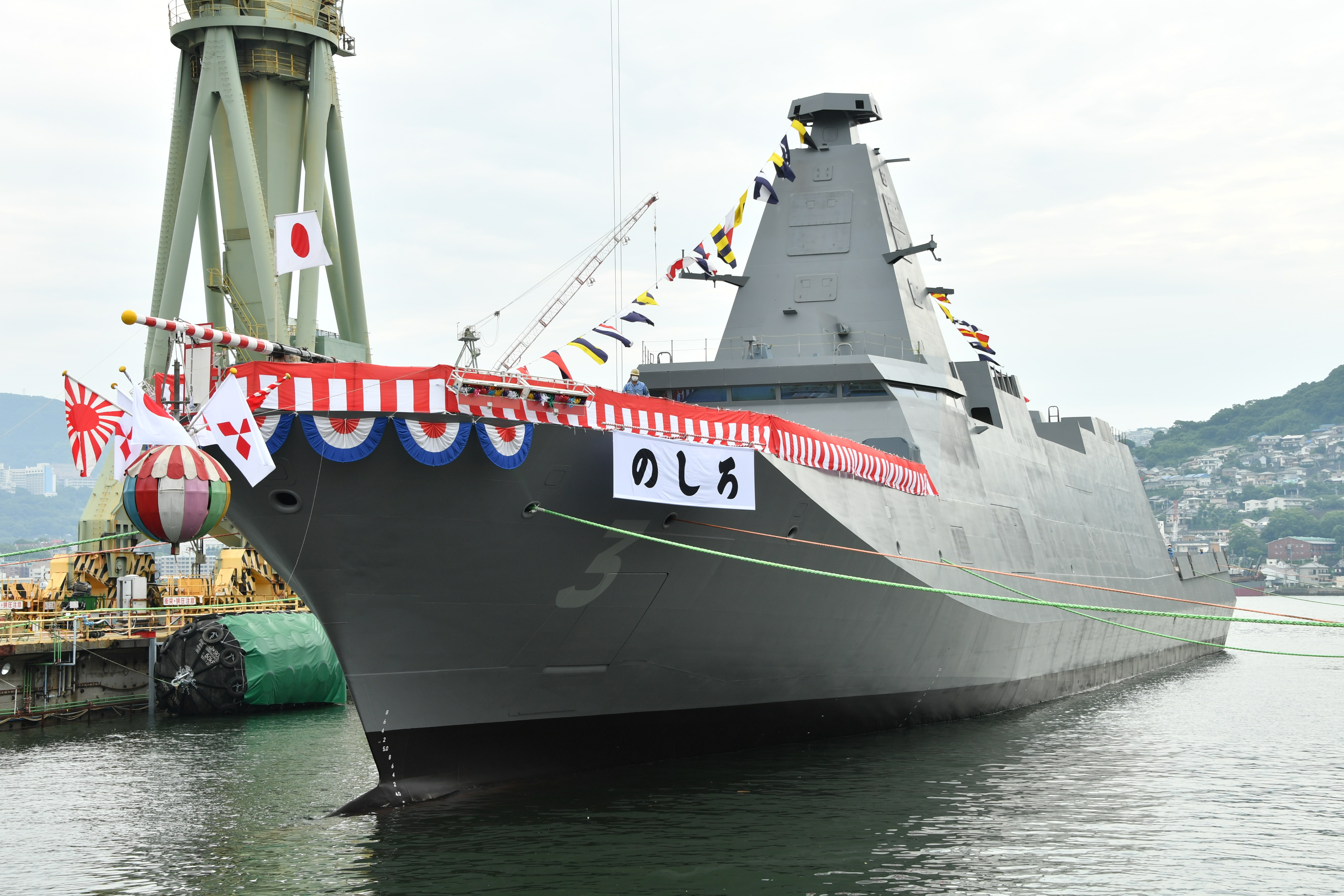
- Noshiro during her launching ceremony, 22 June 2021.

History

Japan
- Name: Noshiro; (のしろ)
- Namesake: Noshiro
- Ordered: 2019
- Builder: Mitsubishi, Nagasaki
- Laid down: 15 July 2020
- Launched: 22 June 2021
- Commissioned: 15 December 2022
- Identification: Pennant number: FFM-3
- Status: Active

General characteristics
- Class & type: Mogami-class frigate
- Displacement: 3,900 tons standard; 5,500 tons full load
- Length: 133 m (436 ft 4 in)
- Beam: 16 m (52 ft 6 in)
- Propulsion: CODAG; 1 × Rolls-Royce MT30 gas turbine; 2 × MAN Diesel V28/33DD STC engine
- Speed: over 30 knots (56 km/h; 35 mph)
- Boats & landing craft carried: 2 × RHIB, UUV, USV
- Crew: 90
- Sensors & processing systems: OPY-2 (X-band multi-purpose AESA radar); OAX-3(EO/IR); OQQ-25 (VDS + TASS); OQQ-11 (Mine-hunting sonar); OYQ-1 (Combat management system); OYX-1-29 (Console display system)
- Electronic warfare & decoys: NOLQ-3E (Passive radar system + Electronic attack capability is integrated into the main radar antenna), Chaff dispenser
- Armament: 1 × 5 in (127 mm) Mk-45 Mod 4 naval gun; 2 × missile canisters for a total of 8 Type 17 anti-ship missiles; 1 × SeaRAM; Type 12 torpedoes; Simplified mine laying equipment; 16 × Mk-41 VLS; Naval version of Type 03 Chū-SAM; 2 × Remote weapon station
- Aircraft carried: 1 × SH-60L helicopter
- Aviation facilities: Single hangar

JS Noshiro (FFM-3) is the third ship of the Mogami-class frigates of the Japan Maritime Self-Defense Force (JMSDF). She was named after the Noshiro River and shares her name with a World War II light cruiser Noshiro and Cold War destroyer escort Noshiro.

== Development and design ==
In 2015 the Japanese defense budget allocated funds to study the construction of a new "compact-type hull destroyer with additional multi-functional capabilities" as well as a new radar system for the destroyer. In the same year Mitsubishi Heavy Industries (MHI) unveiled the frigate's first concept model (30FF) which they have been developing with their own funds.

The 30DX design has an overall length of 133 metres (436 ft 4 in), breadth of 16 metres (52 ft 6 in), a standard displacement of 3,900 tons with a full load displacement of about 5,500 tons, and a maximum speed of over 30 knots (56 km/h; 35 mph). Weapons include a Mk 45 gun, two remote weapon stations above the bridge, 16 Mk 41 VLS at the bow, eight anti-ship missiles, one SeaRAM, an SH-60L helicopter, torpedoes, and decoy launchers. It can also deploy and recover unmanned underwater vehicles (UUVs), unmanned surface vessels (USVs), and sea mines from the rear ramp beneath the helideck. It is also expected to use a naval version of the Type 03 Chū-SAM.

== Construction and career ==
Noshiro was laid down on 15 July 2020 at Mitsubishi Heavy Industries, Nagasaki and launched on 22 June 2021. She was commissioned on 15 December 2022.

On 12 February 2025, the Noshiro sailed to Australia for joint military drills with Australia with a port call in the Philippines in an effort to demonstrate the ship to the Royal Australian Navy.
