= Tatsuta =

Tatsuta may refer to:

- Tatsuta, Aichi, a former village in Japan, merged into the city of Aisai in 2010
- MV Tatsuta Maru, a pre-war Japanese ocean liner of the NYK Line
- Japanese cruiser Tatsuta (1894), an unprotected cruiser in the early Imperial Japanese Navy
- Japanese cruiser Tatsuta (1918), the second vessel of the Tenryū class of light cruisers in the Imperial Japanese Navy during World War II
- Tatsuta Shrine, a Shinto shrine located in Sangō, Nara in Japan
- Tatsuta-age, a Japanese fried chicken dish in the karaage style
- Chicken tatsuta, a Japanese McDonald's sandwich

People with the surname Tatsuta include:

- Naoki Tatsuta (龍田 直樹; born 1950), Japanese voice actor
- Yugo Tatsuta (立田 悠悟; born 1998), Japanese football defender

== See also ==
- Japanese ship Tatsuta
