= Japanese ship Tatsuta =

Three warships of the Imperial Japanese Navy and Japan Maritime Self-Defense Force were named Tatsuta:

- Japanese cruiser Tatsuta (1894), a cruiser launched in 1894 and scrapped in 1926
- Japanese cruiser Tatsuta (1918), a Tenryū-class cruiser launched in 1918 and sunk in 1944
- JS Tatsuta, a Mogami-class frigate launched in 2025 and expected to be commissioned in 2026
