= JS Tatsuta =

Mogami-class frigate

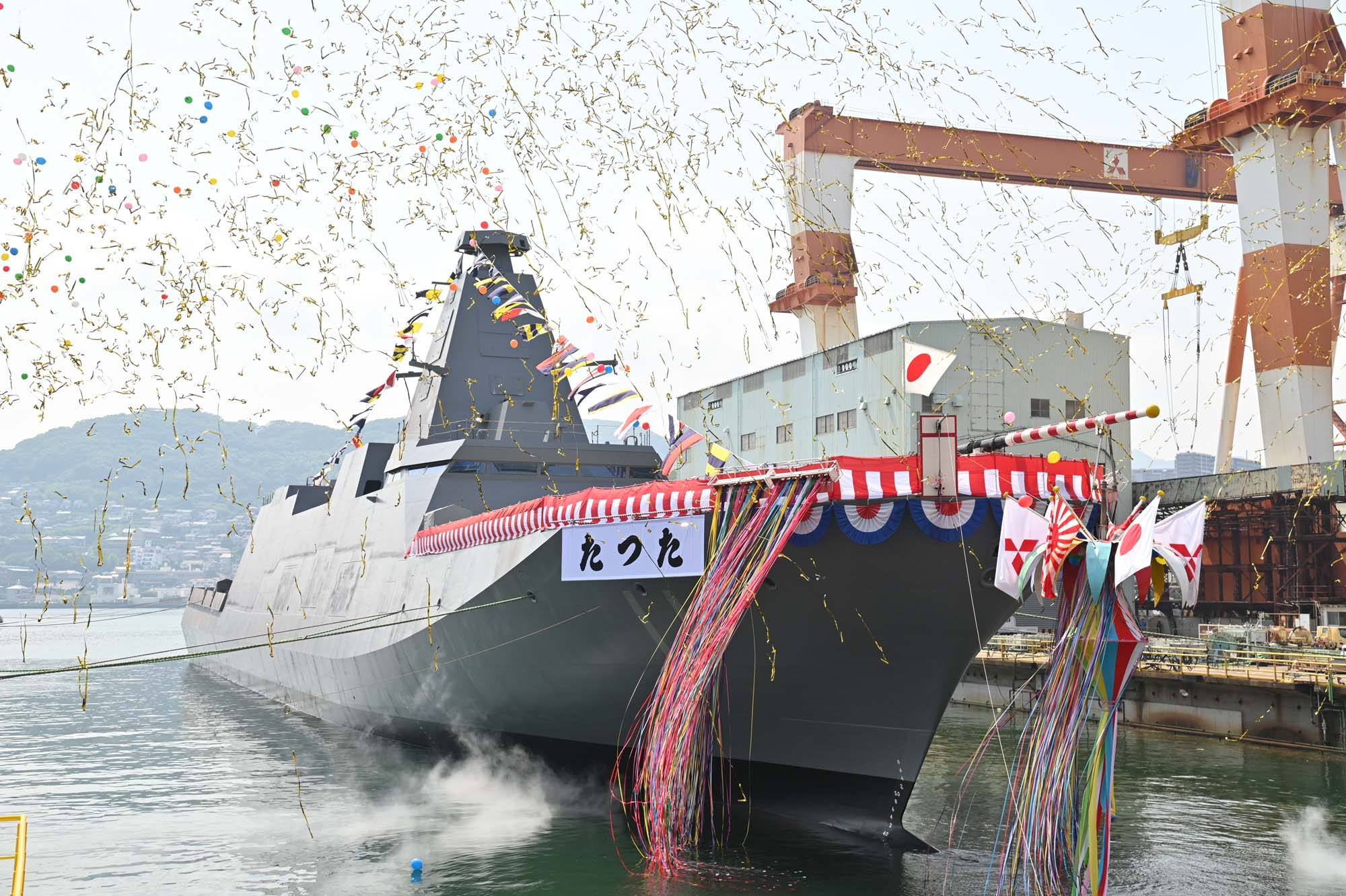
- Tatsuta during her launch ceremony

History

Japan
- Name: Tatsuta
- Namesake: Tatsuta River
- Builder: Mitsubishi Heavy Industries Nagasaki Shipyard
- Cost: Approximately 46 to 47 billion yen
- Laid down: 3 July 2024
- Launched: 2 July 2025
- Commissioned: December 2026 (scheduled)
- Identification: FFM-11
- Status: Fitting out

General characteristics
- Class & type: Mogami-class frigate
- Displacement: 3,900 t (3,800 long tons; 4,300 short tons) (standard); 5,500 t (5,400 long tons; 6,100 short tons) (full load)
- Length: 132.5 m (434 ft 9 in)
- Beam: 16.3 m (53 ft 6 in)
- Draft: 9 m (29 ft 6 in)
- Propulsion: CODAG; 1 × Rolls-Royce MT30 gas turbine; 2 × MAN Diesel V28/33DD STC engine; 2 × shafts
- Speed: 30 knots (56 km/h; 35 mph)
- Boats & landing craft carried: 2 × RHIB, UUV, USV
- Crew: 90-100
- Sensors & processing systems: OPY-2 (X-band multi-purpose AESA radar); OAX-3(EO/IR); OQQ-25 (VDS + TASS); OQQ-11 (Mine-hunting sonar); OYQ-1 (Combat management system); OYX-1-29 (Console display system)
- Electronic warfare & decoys: NOLQ-3E (Passive radar system + Electronic attack capability is integrated into the main radar antenna), Chaff dispenser
- Armament: 1 × 5 in (127 mm) Mk-45 Mod 4 naval gun; 2 × missile canisters for a total of 8 Type 17 anti-ship missiles; 1 × SeaRAM; Type 12 torpedoes; Simplified mine laying equipment; 2 × Mk-41 VLS (16 cells total); Naval version of Type 03 Chū-SAM; 2 × Remote weapon station
- Aircraft carried: 1 × SH-60K patrol helicopter

JS Tatsuta (Japanese: たつた; Hull Number: FFM-11) is a frigate of the Japan Maritime Self-Defense Force and the eleventh ship of the Mogami-class. She was named after the Tatsuta River, a tributary of the Yamato River that flows near Ikoma in the Nara Prefecture. Tatsuta is the third ship to bear the name, after the Imperial Japanese Navy unprotected cruiser Tatsuta, and the Tenryu-class cruiser Tatsuta.

== Construction and career ==
As part of the Mid-Term Defense Program, Tatsuta was ordered from Mitsubishi Heavy Industries (MHI) in the fiscal year 2023, with her keel being laid down at MHI's Nagasaki Shipyard on 3 July 2024. The ship was christened and launched on 2 July 2025, and after a period of being fitted out and undergoing sea trials, she is scheduled to be commissioned in December 2026.
