= Mogami-class frigate =

Class of Japanese stealth frigates

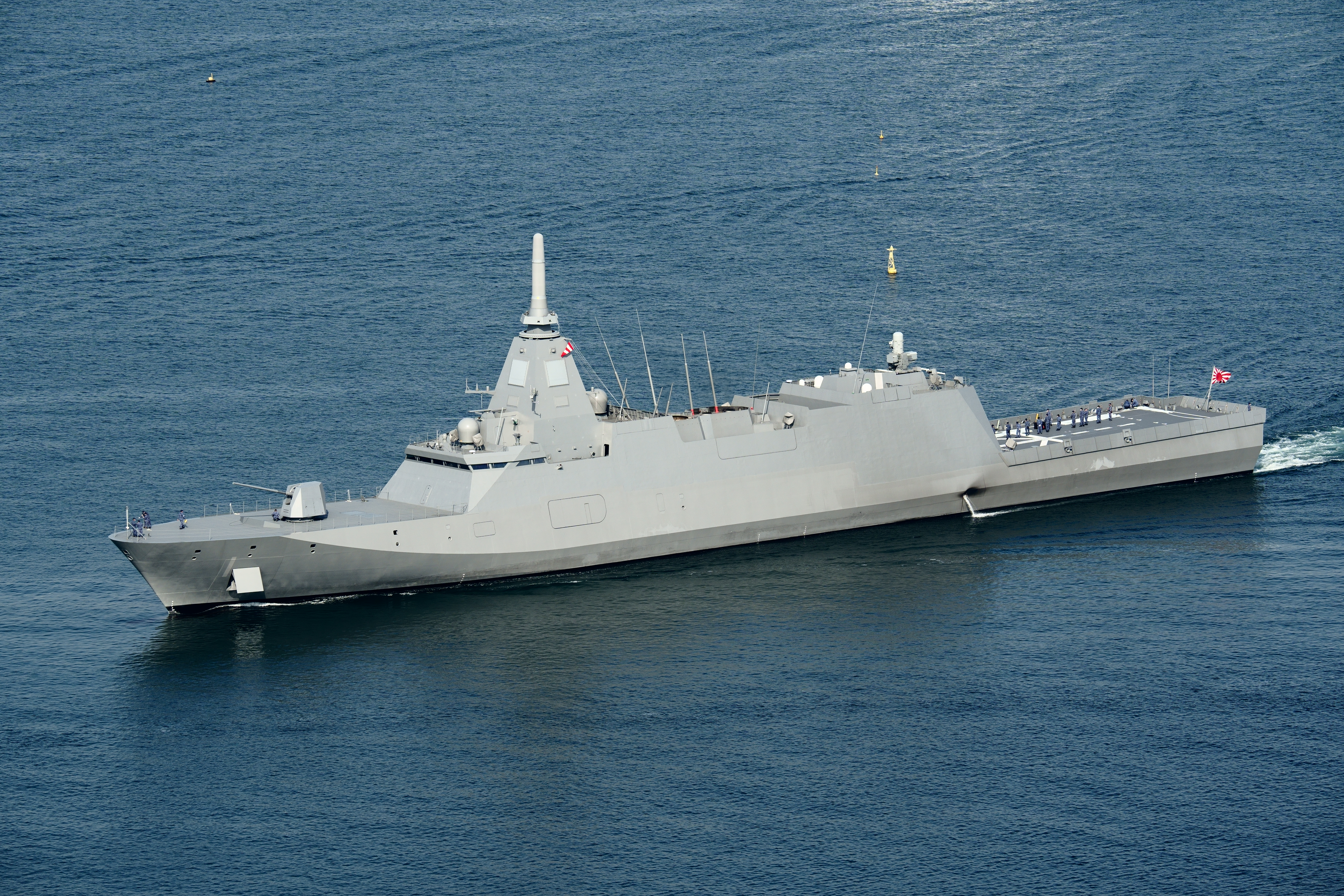
- JS Mogami underway in April 2022

Class overview
- Name: Mogami class
- Builders: Mitsubishi Heavy Industries (MHI); Mitsui Engineering and Shipbuilding
- Operators: Japan Maritime Self-Defense Force
- Preceded by: Abukuma class
- Succeeded by: New FFM (Upgraded Mogami class)
- Cost: ¥50.0 billion (2017 estimate) ($450 million at 2017 exchange rate)
- Built: 2019–present
- In service: 2022–present
- In commission: 2022–present
- Planned: 12
- Building: 2
- Completed: 10
- Active: 10

General characteristics
- Type: Frigate
- Displacement: 3,900 tons standard; 5,500 tons full load
- Length: 132.5 m (434 ft 9 in)
- Beam: 16.3 m (53 ft 6 in)
- Draft: ~4.5 m (14 ft 9 in) (Note: The 9.0m figure frequently cited is the ship's molded depth (keel to main deck), as confirmed by official JMSDF specifications which list depth - "深さ" (Fukasa) as 9.0m. The draught - "喫水" (Kissui) can not be found. I have estimated the draught to be 4.5, because the general arrangement plans indicate the waterline sits at approximately half of the molded depth.)
- Depth: 9 m (29 ft 6 in)
- Propulsion: CODAG; 1 × Rolls-Royce MT30 gas turbine; 2 × MAN Diesel V28/33DD STC engine; Total 70,000 HP
- Speed: over 30 knots (56 km/h; 35 mph)
- Boats & landing craft carried: 2 × RHIB, UUV, USV
- Crew: around 90
- Sensors & processing systems: OPY-2 (X-band multi-purpose AESA radar); OAX-3(EO/IR); OQQ-25 (VDS + TASS) – ASW; OQQ-11 (Mine-hunting sonar); OYQ-1 (Combat management system); OYX-1-29 (Console display system)
- Electronic warfare & decoys: NOLQ-3E (Passive radar system + Electronic attack capability is integrated into the main radar antenna), Chaff dispenser
- Armament: 1 × 5 in (127 mm) Mk-45 Mod 4 naval gun; 2 × missile canisters for a total of 8 Type 17 anti-ship missiles; 1 × SeaRAM; Type 12 torpedoes; Simplified mine laying equipment; 16 × Mk-41 VLS; Type 07 VLA; 2 × Remote weapon station
- Aircraft carried: 1 × SH-60L helicopter
- Aviation facilities: Single hangar

The Mogami-class frigate (Japanese: もがみ型護衛艦, romanized: Mogami-gata-goei-kan), also known as 30FFM, 30FF, 30DX, or 30DEX, is a Japanese, multi-mission stealth frigate for the Japan Maritime Self-Defense Force (JMSDF).

== Development ==
In 2015, the Japanese defense budget allocated funds to study the construction of a new "compact-type hull destroyer with additional multi-functional capabilities", as well as a new radar system for the destroyer. In 2015, Mitsubishi Heavy Industries (MHI) unveiled the frigate's first concept model (30FF), which they had been developing with their own funds.

In August 2017, the Acquisition, Technology & Logistics Agency (ATLA) selected MHI and Mitsui Engineering and Shipbuilding as the prime contractor and subcontractor to construct the frigate. The agency selected a completely new design of the vessel (30DX), replacing the Asagiri-class destroyers and Abukuma-class destroyer escorts. The plan approved in December 2018 was to build 22 Mogami-class frigates. Construction of the class began in 2019 – with a pair to be built each year. In August 2023, the Japanese Ministry of Defense announced that it would only build 12 ships to the Mogami-class design, and planned to build 12 "new FFM", which have been described as "improved Mogami-class ships".

In January 2023, ATLA announced the "Guidelines for Recruiting Applicants for the 'Plan Proposal Contract for the New FFM'". In July 2024, MHI unveiled the "Upgraded Mogami", the formal name for the new FFM. The construction schedule for the "Upgraded Mogami" frigates will start in 2025, with launch of the first two hulls by 2027. MHI plans to deliver all 12 FFM frigates to the JMSDF by 2033.

In March 2024, it was reported that the Mogami-class frigates will be equipped with vertical launching systems (VLS) from FY 2024. The Mogami-class marks the first installment of a combined diesel and gas (CODAG) system on any JMSDF ship.

== Design ==
=== Operational concept ===
In December 2022, the Japanese Ministry of Defense released its 2023 Defense Buildup Program guidance, which noted that the Japanese Maritime Self Defense Force planned to replace its fleet of older, less capable destroyers and Abukuma-class destroyer escorts with Mogami-class frigates.

The overall intent of the 30DX design was to achieve a modern, frigate-sized vessel with capabilities similar to the Akizuki-class destroyer but with a reduced crew and having only half the VLS cells.

=== 30FF ===
The original intention was to use the 30FF model. The 30FF design looked similar to the United States Navy's Freedom-class littoral combat ship with an integrated mast. Its armament included a 5-inch/54-caliber Mark 45 gun, two remote weapon stations between the bridge and main gun, a SeaRAM battery above the helicopter hangar, and an onboard helicopter. The length of this version of the vessel was to be 120 metres (393 ft 8 in), with a max beam of 18 metres (59 ft 1 in), and a displacement of about 3,000 metric tons (3,000 long tons). The 30FF design had a planned maximum speed of 40 knots (74 km/h; 46 mph) and accommodated a crew of about 100.

=== 30DX ===
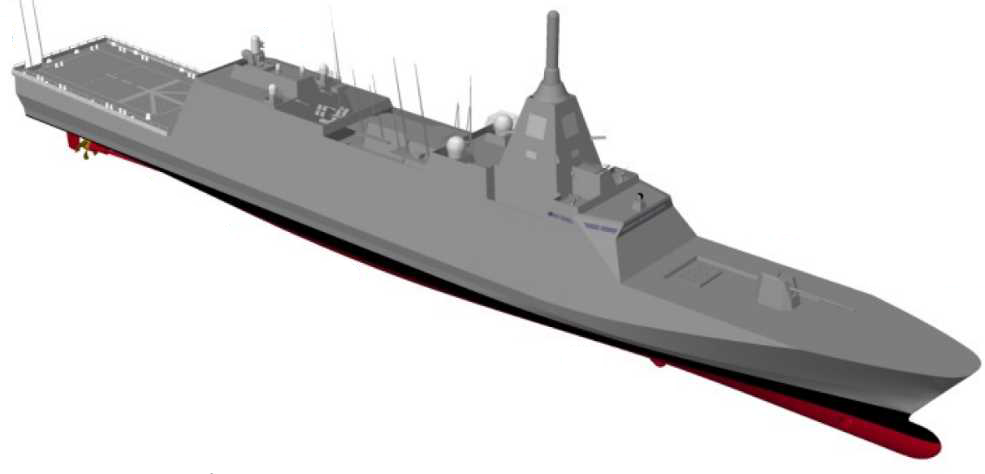
A 3D concept rendering of the 30DX frigate

The 30DX model was chosen to be constructed. The 30DX design, although modern, is more conservative compared to the 30FF's more radical approach. The three main factors for the design change were due to the need for affordability, miniaturization/automation, and multi-mission capabilities.

The vessel has a length of 130 metres (426 ft 6 in), a breadth of 16 metres (52 ft 6 in), a standard displacement of 3,900 metric tons (3,800 long tons) with a full load displacement of about 5,500 metric tons (5,400 long tons). It has a maximum speed of over 30 knots (56 km/h; 35 mph). The frigates will be powered by a Rolls-Royce MT30 gas turbine.

Weapons for the 30DX include a Mk 45 gun, two remote weapon stations above the bridge, a 16-cell Mk 41 Vertical Launching System (VLS) at the bow, eight anti-ship missiles, one SeaRAM, an SH-60L helicopter, torpedoes, and decoy launchers. Another capability is to deploy and recover unmanned underwater vehicles (UUV), unmanned surface vehicles (USV), and sea mines from the rear ramp beneath the helicopter deck.

In 2018, there were plans to install the Type 23 ship-to-air missiles under development on the Mogami class VLS. As of 2023, only Type 07 VLAs will be installed on the VLS. The Type 23 ship-to-air missiles are planned to be installed on the "Upgraded Mogami", for which construction will begin in fiscal year 2024.

The stealthy design of both models is based on the research and development lessons learned from the Mitsubishi X-2 Shinshin, then: ATD-X, stealth fighter technology demonstrator, as both platforms are designed by Mitsubishi Heavy Industries. Along with stealth capabilities, the frigate emphasizes a high level of automation. This allows the frigate to possess a small crew size of only 90 personnel when compared to the crew complement of other ships of similar size.

At Sea Air Space 2019, Mitsubishi Heavy Industries revealed their 'Advanced Integrated CIC' for the vessel. It will combine the wheelhouse, the managing and situational awareness room, the engine and power control room, and combat information center within a large 360-degree circular screen wall. It can display panoramic views around the ship without a blind spot on the screen and will utilize augmented reality technology to discriminate among the objects shown and to navigate the ship. This allows the crew to operate under a Total Ship Crew System (TSCS) where navigation, steering and ship management is centralized into one area.

=== Upgraded Mogami ===
The "Upgraded Mogami" or "New FFM" is an evolution of the original Mogami-class frigates. It has a length of 142 metres (465 ft 11 in), a beam of 17 metres (55 ft 9 in), and a standard displacement of 4,880 metric tons (4,800 long tons). The "Upgraded Mogami" will have an improved radar and a 32-cell Mark 41 VLS, an additional 16-cells compared to the earlier Mogami frigates.

== Equipment ==
=== C4ISR ===
The Mogami-class frigates support Link 22 as their tactical data link. Conventional ships have had multiple antennas mounted individually on their masts. In contrast, the Mogami-class frigates are fitted with a spire-shaped "NORA-50" antenna array located atop the bridge. It integrates antennas for electronic support for radar (ES-R) and communication (ES-C), Wi-Fi band, Link 16, UHF/VHF communications, identification friend or foe (IFF), and tactical air navigation (TACAN), into a single radome-enclosed structure in order to reduce radar cross section and improve the stealth characteristics of the ships. This communications antenna—also known as the "integrated mast" or "UNICORN" (United Complex Radio Antenna)—features a streamlined profile that is simpler than conventional lattice or prismatic masts and minimizes radio wave reflection. The base of the mast is designed for easy electrical connection to the hull, simplifing component replacement, maintenance and installation processes. According to the developers, the arrangement of these antennas is optimized to improve the maximum detection range of radio waves emitted from outside.

The NORA-50 "UNICORN" system was jointly developed by three Japanese companies: NEC Corporation, Sampa Kogyo K.K. and the Yokohama Rubber Company. The prime contractor NEC provided hardware integration and TACAN systems. Sampa Kogyo provided its antenna design for shipboard terrestrial communications and its know-how to maintain and repair shipboard equipment. Yokohama Rubber developed the radome designed to provide high radio-wave transparency across the broad range of frequencies used by the antennas, while also providing weather and lightning resistance to protect the entire system from lightning strikes.

In fiscal year 2023, UNICORN received the top award from the Defense Structure Improvement Foundation, a public interest incorporated foundation in Japan. This award is given to individuals or groups who have made outstanding achievements in the development and production of defense equipment, under the sponsorship of ATLA.

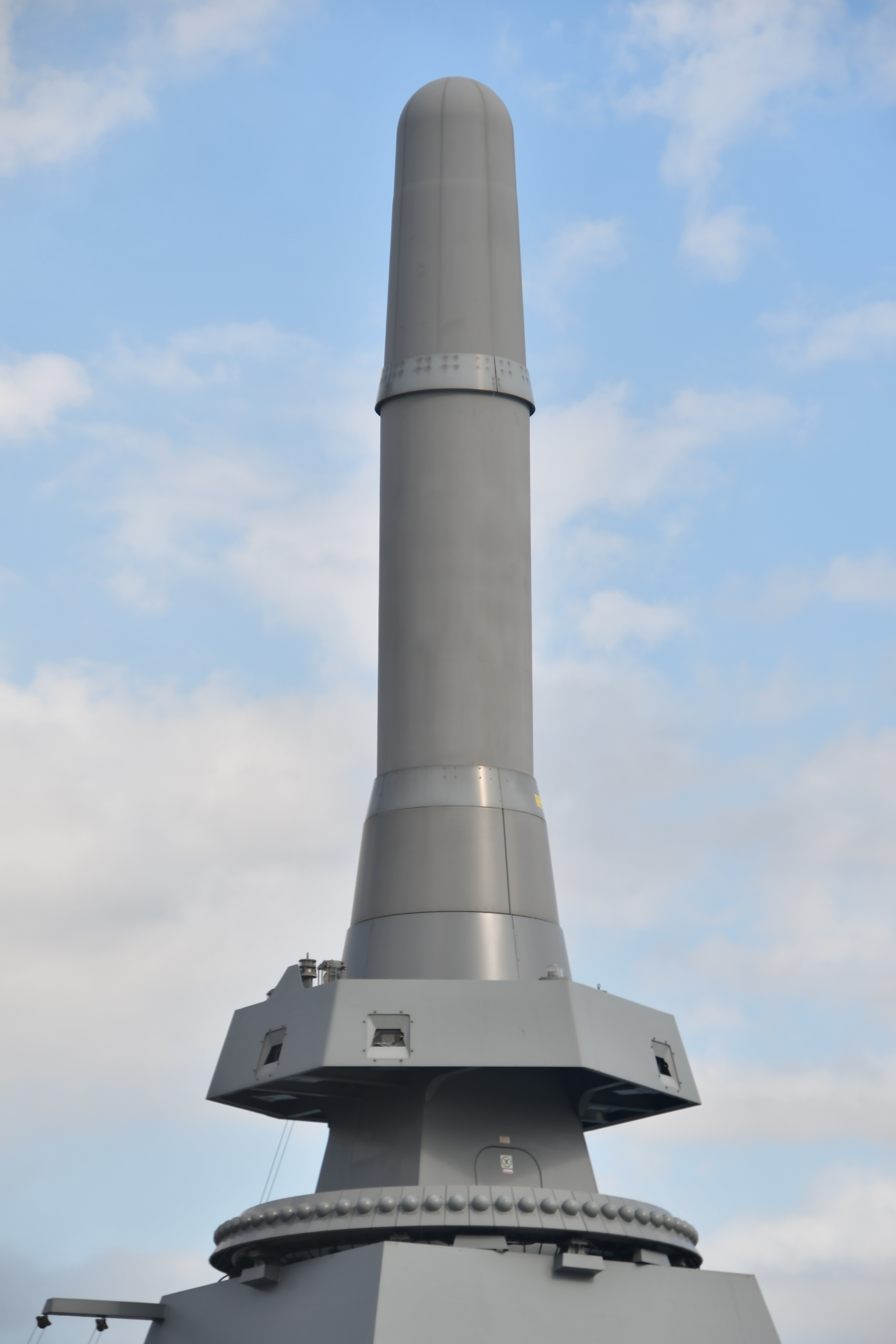
"NORA-50" communications antenna

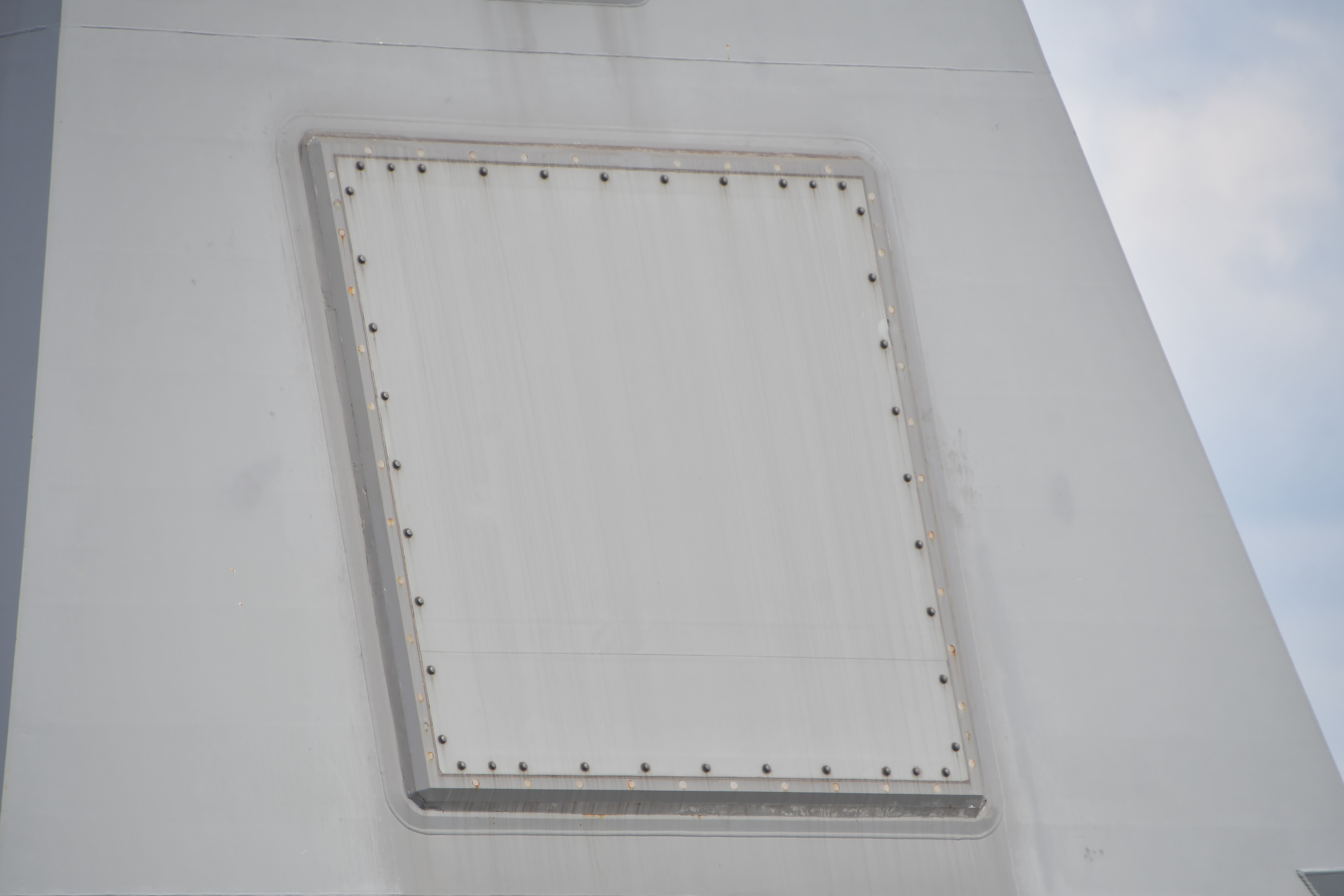
"OPY-2" multifunction radar

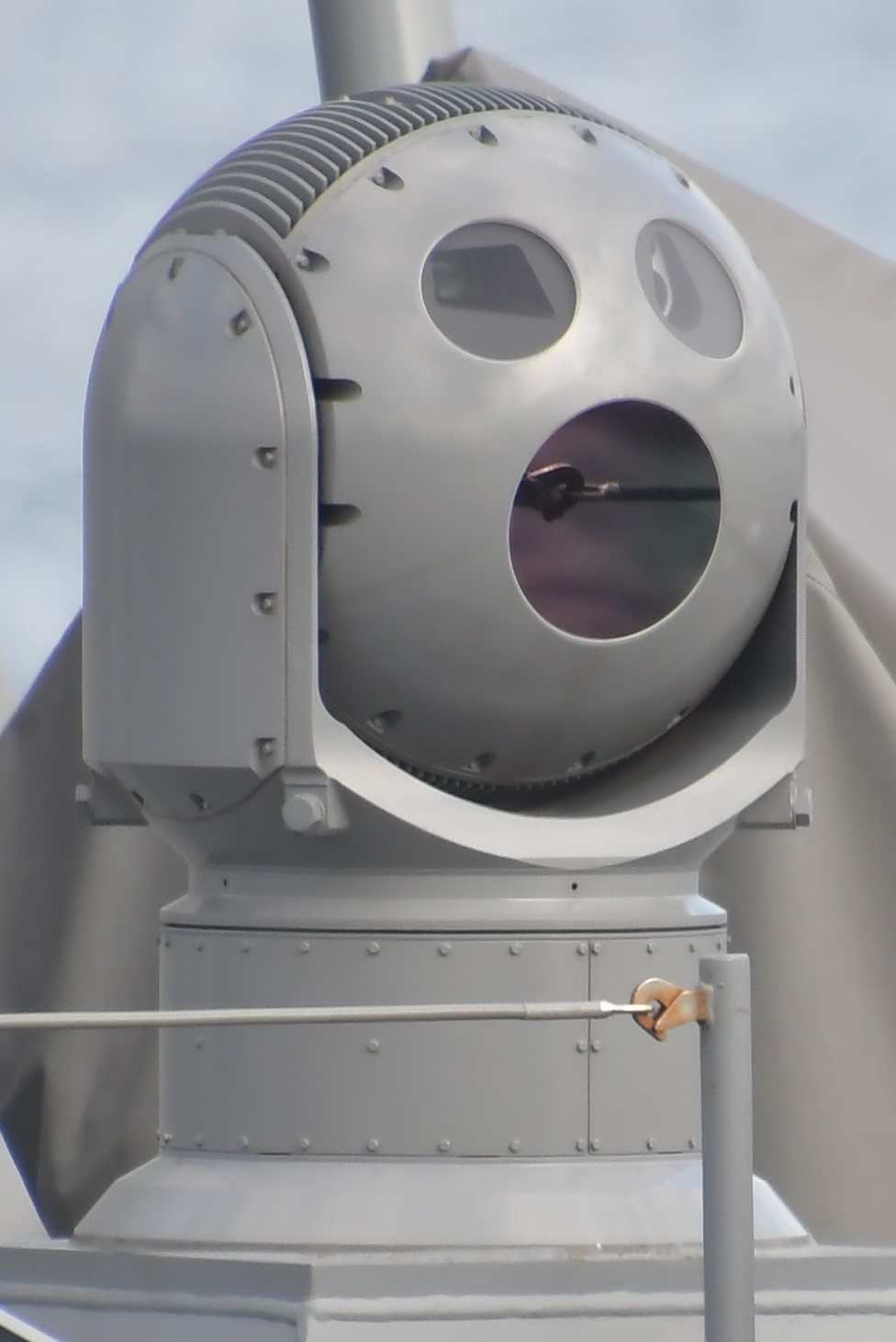
"OAX-3" movable sensor

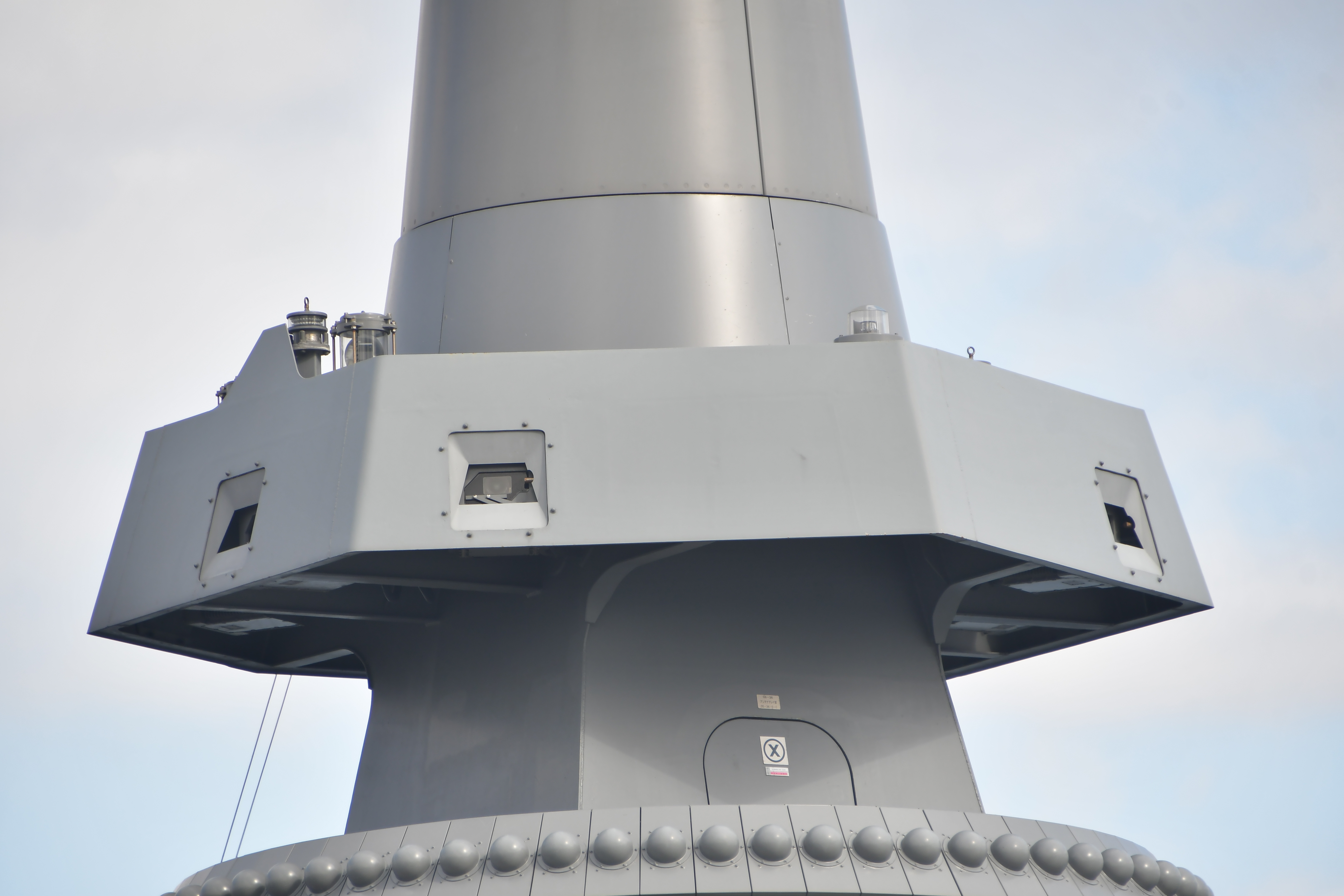
"OAX-3" fixed sensor

== Ships in the class ==
The budget for the procurement of VLS is allocated separately from the budget for the construction of the vessels, with the supplementary budget for FY2021 allocated for the procurement of two VLS and the budget for FY2023 allocated for the procurement of 10 VLS. As a result, the VLS will gradually be installed on vessels from JS Mogami to JS Agano that were not equipped with VLS when they entered service.

Hull No.	Name	Laid down	Launched	Commissioned	Builder
FFM-1	JS Mogami	29 Oct 2019	3 Mar 2021	28 Apr 2022	MHI (Nagasaki)
FFM-2	JS Kumano	30 Oct 2019	19 Nov 2020	22 Mar 2022	Mitsui E&S (Tamano) (Note: Mitsubishi Heavy Industries Maritime Systems took over Mitsui's shipbuilding business during the construction of the ship.)
FFM-3	JS Noshiro	15 Jul 2020	22 Jun 2021	15 Dec 2022	MHI (Nagasaki)
FFM-4	JS Mikuma	15 Jul 2020	10 Dec 2021	7 Mar 2023	MHI (Nagasaki)
FFM-5	JS Yahagi	24 Jun 2021	23 Jun 2022	21 May 2024	MHI (Nagasaki)
FFM-6	JS Agano	24 Jun 2021	21 Dec 2022	20 Jun 2024	MHI (Nagasaki)
FFM-7	JS Niyodo	30 Jun 2022	26 Sep 2023	21 May 2025	MHI (Nagasaki)
FFM-8	JS Yūbetsu	30 Aug 2022	14 Nov 2023	19 June 2025	MHI (Tamano)
FFM-9	JS Natori	6 Jul 2023	24 Jun 2024	21 May 2026	MHI (Nagasaki)
FFM-10	JS Nagara	6 Jul 2023	19 Dec 2024	29 June 2026	MHI (Nagasaki)
FFM-11	JS Tatsuta	3 Jul 2024	2 Jul 2025	Dec 2026	MHI (Nagasaki)
FFM-12	JS Yoshii	3 Jul 2024	22 Dec 2025	Mar 2027	MHI (Nagasaki)

Planned date

== Partnerships ==
=== Australia ===
The FFM design was shortlisted as a contender for the Royal Australian Navy's new general purpose frigates. Australia plans to acquire up to eleven frigates. The first batch of ships will be built overseas before transitioning to an Australian build. The Mogami design competed with Germany's MEKO A-200, South Korea’s FFX Batch II/III, and Spain’s Alfa 3000 as proposed entries for RAN's next frigate.

MHI displayed the "Upgraded Mogami", previously known as the new FFM, at IODS 2024. The "Upgraded Mogami" frigate represents MHI's proposal for the Royal Australian Navy's general purpose frigate program. In September 2024, it was announced that Canberra will decide on a frigate model for the GPFP before the end of the year. In November 2024, the Mogami design was one of the final two designs shortlisted, alongside Germany's MEKO A-200 design. On 28 November 2024, it was announced that Tokyo will allow Canberra to be involved in joint development and production of the Mogami class, if it is selected to be the new Australian frigate.

In February 2025, the Noshiro sailed to Australia for joint military drills with Australia, with a port call in the Philippines, in an effort to demonstrate the ship to the Royal Australian Navy. In June 2025, the JS Yahagi docked in Darwin, with JMSDF officers hosting a reception for officers in Royal Australian Navy.

In July 2025, Japanese officials conducted a briefing in Canberra, showing the upgraded Mogami and its advantages of being equipped to be interoperable with the US Navy.

On 5 August 2025, the New FFM was selected, with the first ship to be delivered in 2029 and operational by 2030. The first 3 FFMs will be built in MHI's shipyards in Japan. It is planned that the following 8 will be built in Henderson Shipyard, WA. Rear Admiral Hughes, Head of Naval Capability RAN, commented at Indo Pacific 2025 that the Australia Mogami frigates would be equipped with the Kongsberg Naval Strike Missile, instead of the Type 17 anti-ship missile. It will be equipped with the Mk 54 lightweight torpedo, SeaRAM, and deploy ESSM in the Mk 41 VLS.

== Potential exports ==
Both frigate designs have been showcased at four naval exhibitions to attract potential export customers. The 30FF was shown in PACIFIC 2015 as a contender for the Royal Australian Navy's SEA5000 ASW Frigate Program and on display again at Sea Air Space 2017. The 30DX design was shown in Sea Air Space 2018, as well as 2019, and Euronaval 2018. The new FFM design was showcased at Indo Pacific 2023 as the 'FMF-AAW'.

=== India ===
The foreign and defense ministers from India and Japan agreed to proceed with Tokyo’s export to New Delhi of the UNICORN integrated stealth antenna system used for the Mogami-class frigates at the third "2+2" ministerial meeting in New Delhi on 20 August 2024.

In July 2026, India and Japan signed an agreement for the co-development of a naval radio antenna based on Japan’s UNICORN system. Indian Prime Minister Narendra Modi revealed the development during a joint press briefing with Japanese Prime Minister Sanae Takaichi. This is among the most tangible outcomes of bilateral defence cooperation, which has been limited to joint exercises and other activities before.

=== Indonesia ===
Japan initially planned to export four frigates to Indonesia either on late 2023 or early 2024. Another four were to be built in Indonesia under a ¥300 billion contract under PT PAL. In March 2021, Japan and Indonesia signed a military cooperation agreement, which increased speculation that the Mogami-class frigate would be exported to Indonesia. As of mid-2024, no export contract had been signed. The Indonesian Navy instead plans to acquire two Arrowhead 140 frigates and up to six FREMM frigates.

On 14 May 2026, it was reported by Indonesian Navy Chief of Staff, Admiral Muhammad Ali that Tokyo offered the frigate during a meeting between Japanese Defence Minister Shinjirō Koizumi and Indonesian Defence Minister Sjafrie Sjamsoeddin.

=== New Zealand ===
In October 2025, the Royal New Zealand Navy expressed interest in obtaining the frigate. Talks started in November 2025.

On 7 May 2026, the New Zealand Ministry of Defense announced that the Type 31 frigate and the Upgraded Mogami were the two contenders to replace the RNZN's Anzac-class frigates. On May 26, 2026, it was announced that discussions on potentially acquiring the Mogami would take place in Singapore during the Shangri-La Dialogue security forum in a trilateral dialogue with Japanese Defense Minister Shinjiro Koizumi, New Zealand Defense Minister Chris Penk and Australian Defense Minister Richard Marles.

=== United States ===
On 1 September 2026, USNI News reported that the Mogami-class is considered in the latest frigate competition conducted by the United States Navy, along with frigate designs built by South Korea and Turkey. On 10 September 2026, concerns were reported that MHI may pull back from the competition due to the need of substantial financial investment to the US shipbuilding yards if the company won the competition and initial contract commitments to the JMSDF and RAN.

== See also ==
- List of frigate classes in service
- List of active Japan Maritime Self-Defense Force ships

=== Equivalent frigates of the same era ===
- FF(X), US
- Chungnam class, South Korea
- FDI, France
- Tamandaré class, Brazil
- Miguel Malvar class, Philippines
- Istanbul class, Turkey
- Type 31, UK
