= Type 12 torpedo =

Japanese anti-submarine weapon

Type 12
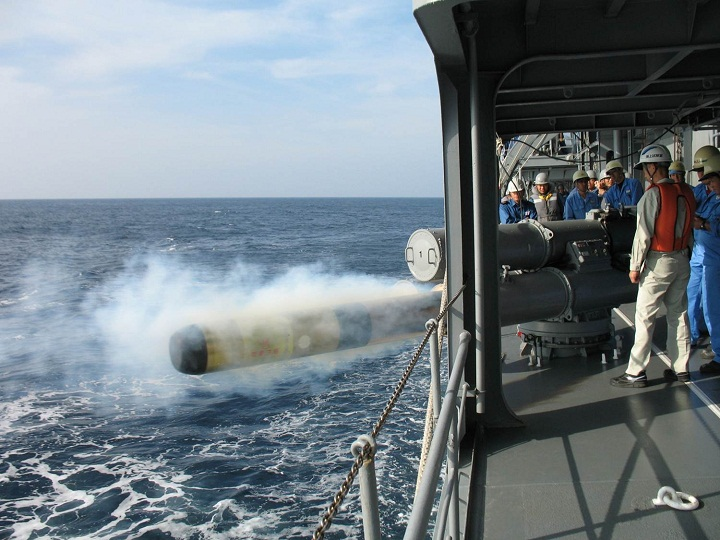
- Type: Torpedo
- Place of origin: Japan

Service history
- In service: 2012 – present
- Used by: Japan Maritime Self-Defense Force

Production history
- Designed: 2005–2012
- Manufacturer: Mitsubishi Heavy Industries

Specifications
- Diameter: 324 mm

The Type 12 Torpedo (12式短魚雷, 12 Shiki Tan Gyorai, development name G-RX5) is a lightweight anti-submarine homing torpedo developed by the Technical Research and Development Institute, a department of the Japanese Ministry of Defense and built by Mitsubishi Heavy Industries for the Japanese Maritime Self Defense Force.
