= JS Shiranui =

Asahi-class destroyer

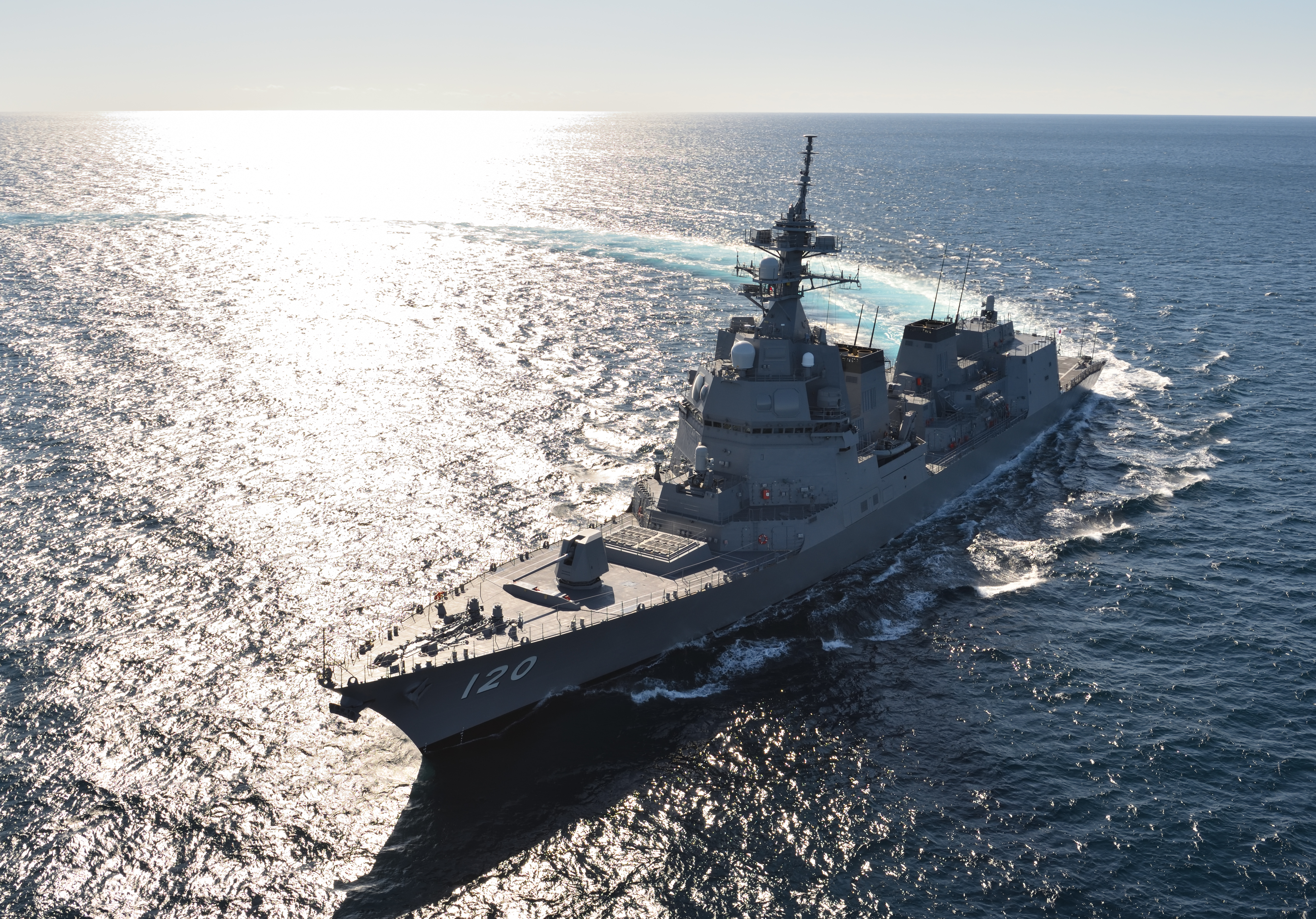
- JS Shiranui underway on 28 February 2019.

History

Japan
- Name: Shiranui; (しらぬい)
- Namesake: Shiranui
- Owner: Japan Maritime Self-Defense Force
- Builder: Mitsubishi Heavy Industries, Nagasaki
- Laid down: 20 May 2016
- Launched: 12 October 2017
- Commissioned: 27 February 2019
- Identification: Pennant number: DD-120
- Status: Active

General characteristics
- Class & type: Asahi-class destroyer
- Displacement: 5,100 tonnes standard; 6,800 tonnes full load
- Length: 151 m (495 ft 5 in)
- Beam: 18.3 m (60 ft 0 in)
- Draft: 5.4 m (17 ft 9 in)
- Depth: 10.9 m (35 ft 9 in)
- Propulsion: COGLAG, two shafts, two GE LM2500 turbines
- Speed: 30 kn (56 km/h; 35 mph)
- Complement: 230
- Sensors & processing systems: OYQ-13 ACDS; FCS-3A AAW system; OPY-1 AAW system; OQQ-24 ASW system; OQR-4 Towed sonar array system; NOLQ-3D-2 EW system; OPS-48 surface search radar
- Armament: 1 × Mk. 45 Mod 4 127 mm (5 in)/62 gun; 8 × Type 90 Anti-ship missile in quad canisters; 2 × 20 mm Phalanx Block1B CIWS; 2 × HOS-303 triple 324 mm (12.8 in) torpedo tubes; Anti-torpedo System; 32-cell Mk. 41 Vertical launching system; RIM-162 ESSM SAM; RUM-139 VL-ASROC; Type 07 VL-ASROC
- Aircraft carried: 1 × SH-60K helicopter

JS Shiranui (DD-120) is the second ship of the Asahi-class destroyer of the Japanese Maritime Self-Defense Force. Her namesake came from the optical phenomenon called Shiranui, or "Phosphorescent Light".

== Development ==
The procurement of the destroyer began in 2013 in response to the reduction in the number of destroyers (namely the Hatsuyuki class) within the JMSDF. The two major characteristics of this destroyer is its bigger emphasis on anti-submarine warfare and the adoption of the COGLAG (combined gas turbine electric and gas turbine) propulsion system. A second destroyer was procured a year later.

== Construction and career ==
She was laid down on 20 May 2016 and launched on 12 October 2017. Commissioned on 27 February 2019 with the hull number DD-120.

== Gallery ==
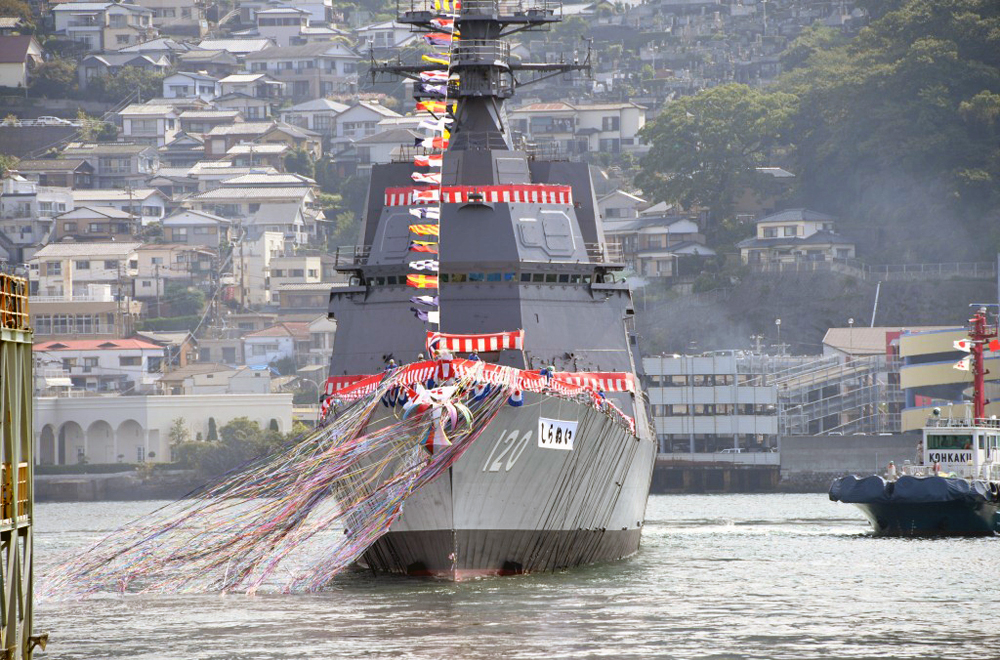
JS Shiranui being launched on 15 October 2017.

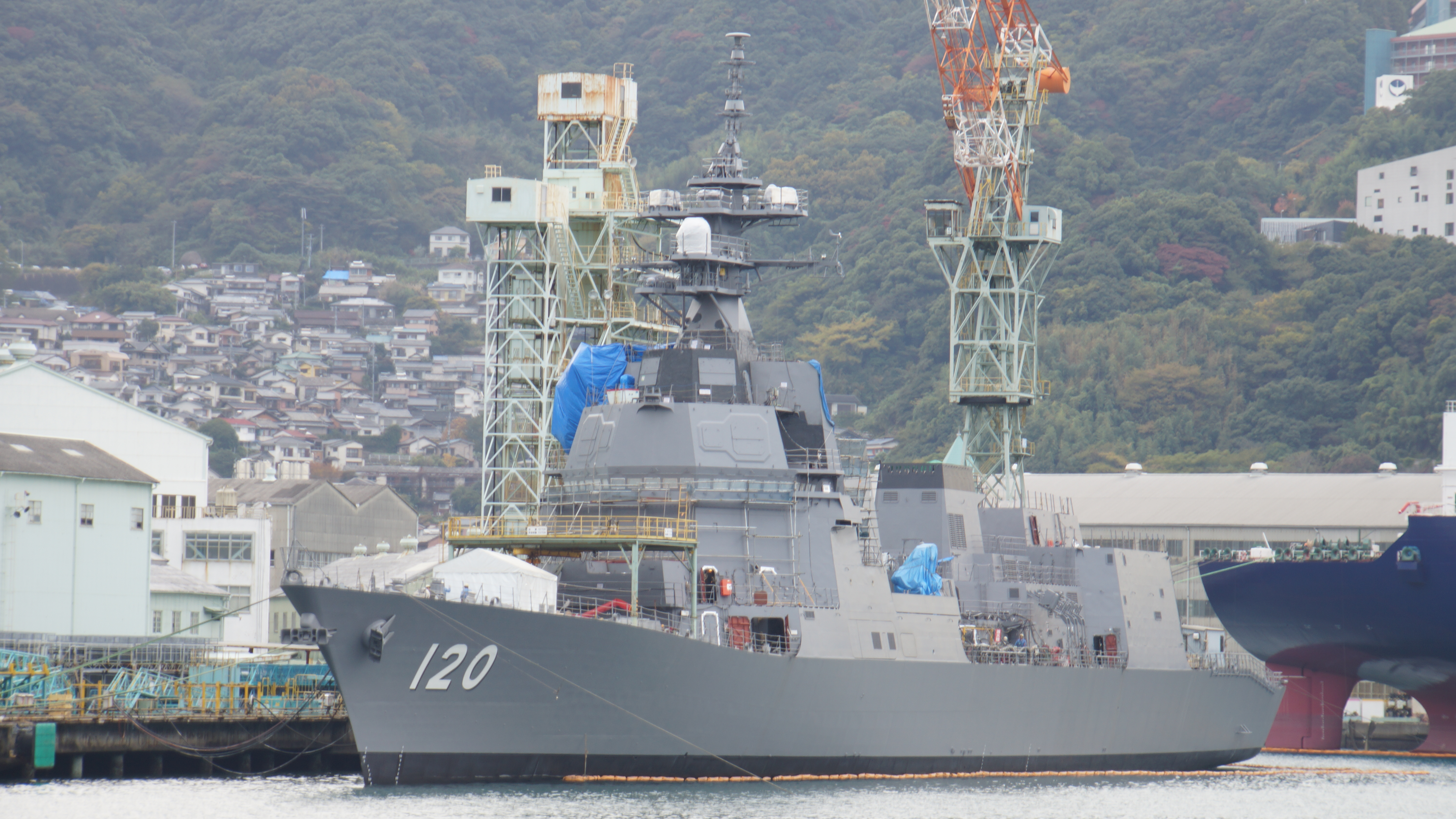
JS Shiranui fitting out at Mitsubishi Heavy Industries shipyard, Nagasaki on 25 November 2017.

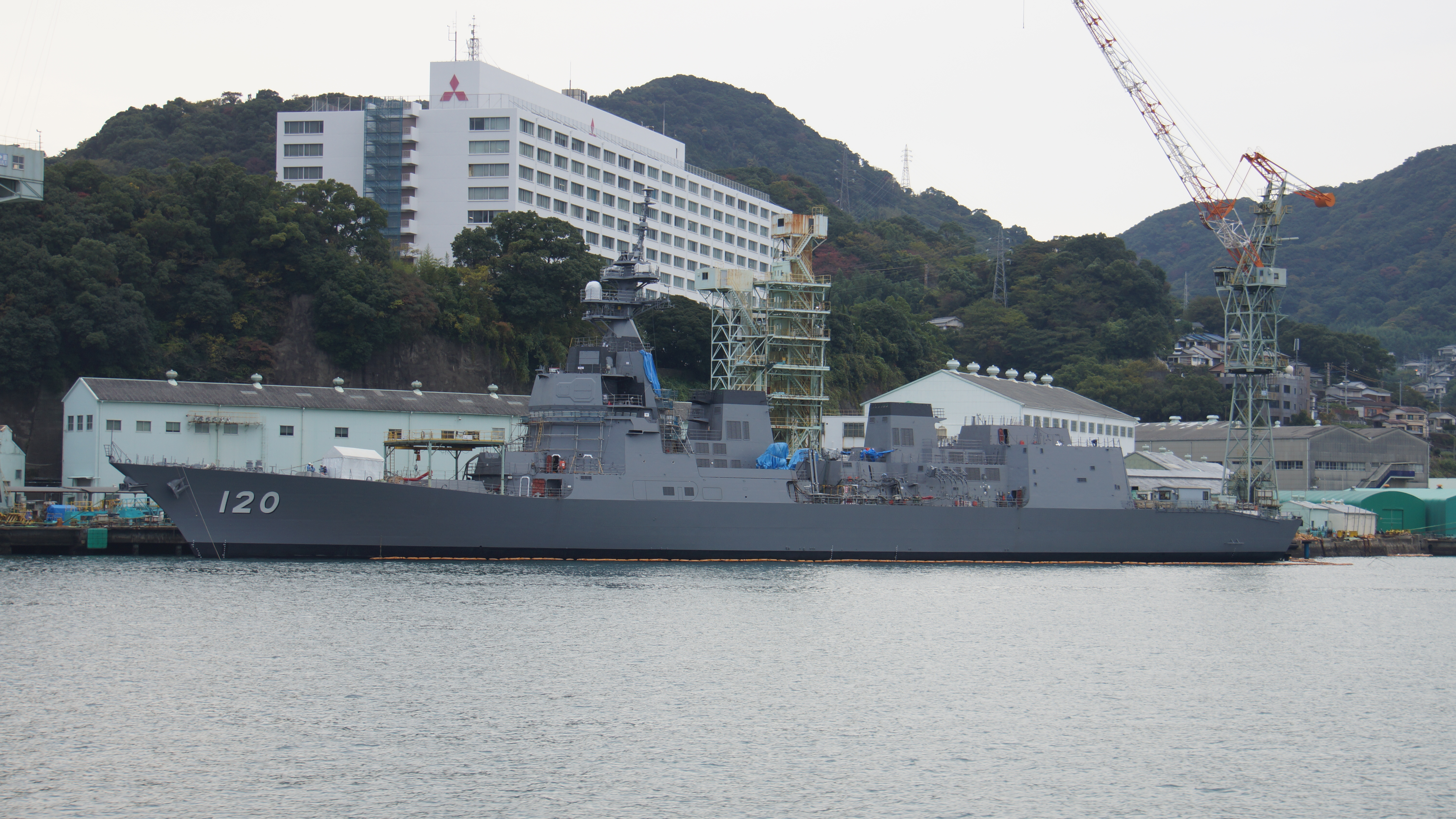
JS Shiranui fitting out at Mitsubishi Heavy Industries shipyard, Nagasaki on 25 November 2017.

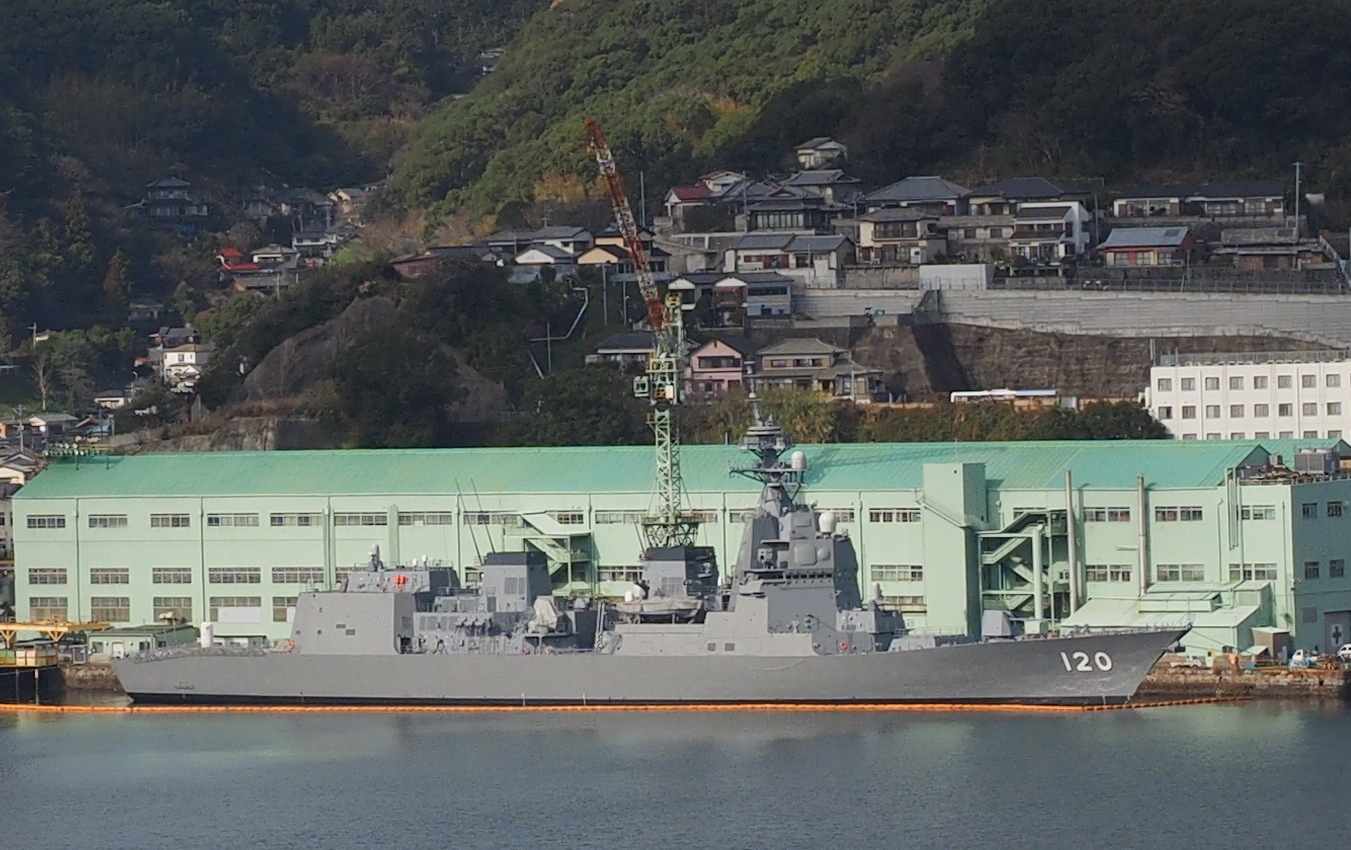
JS Shiranui at Nagasaki on 20 January 2019.

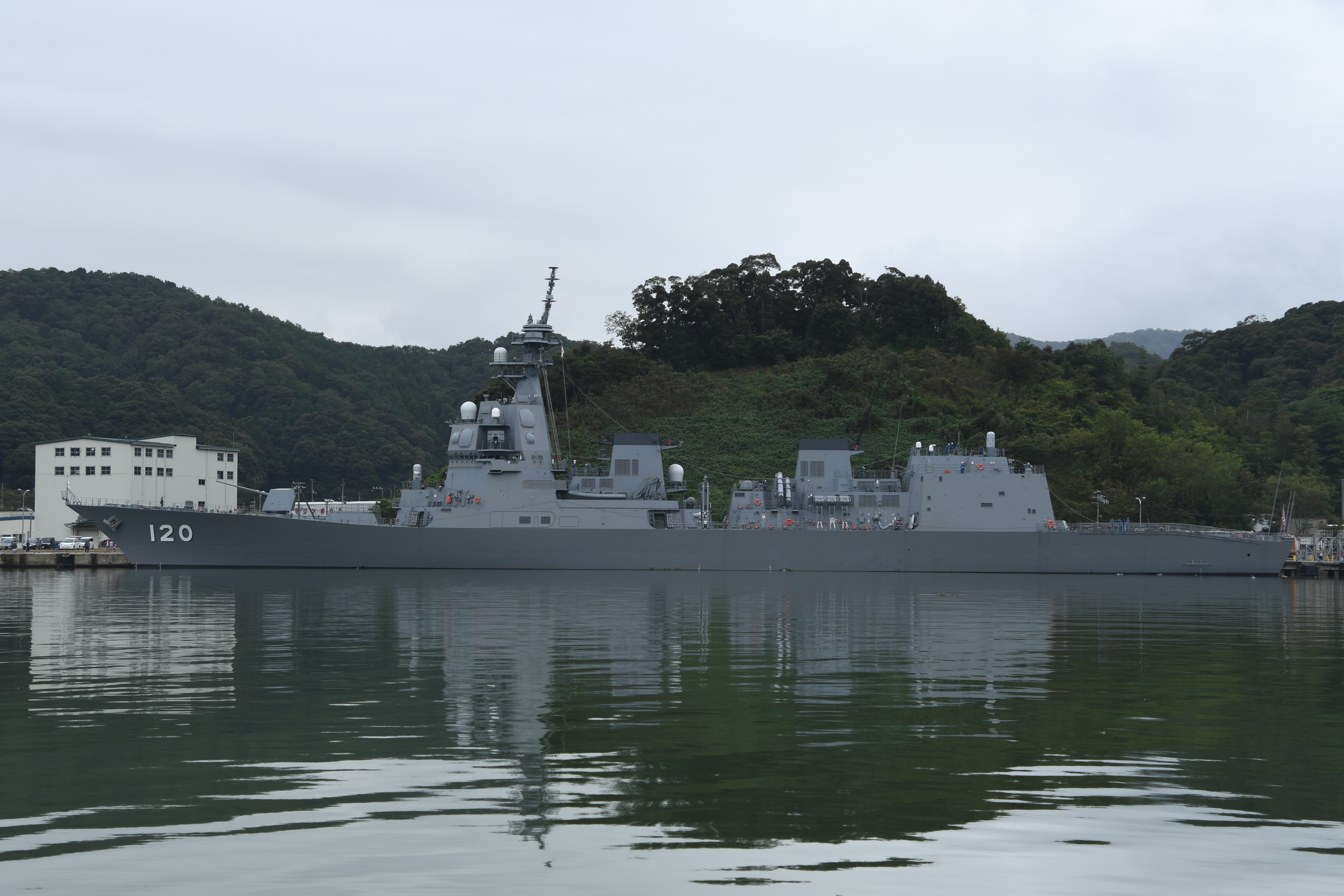
JS Shiranui at Yokosuka on 14 October 2019.

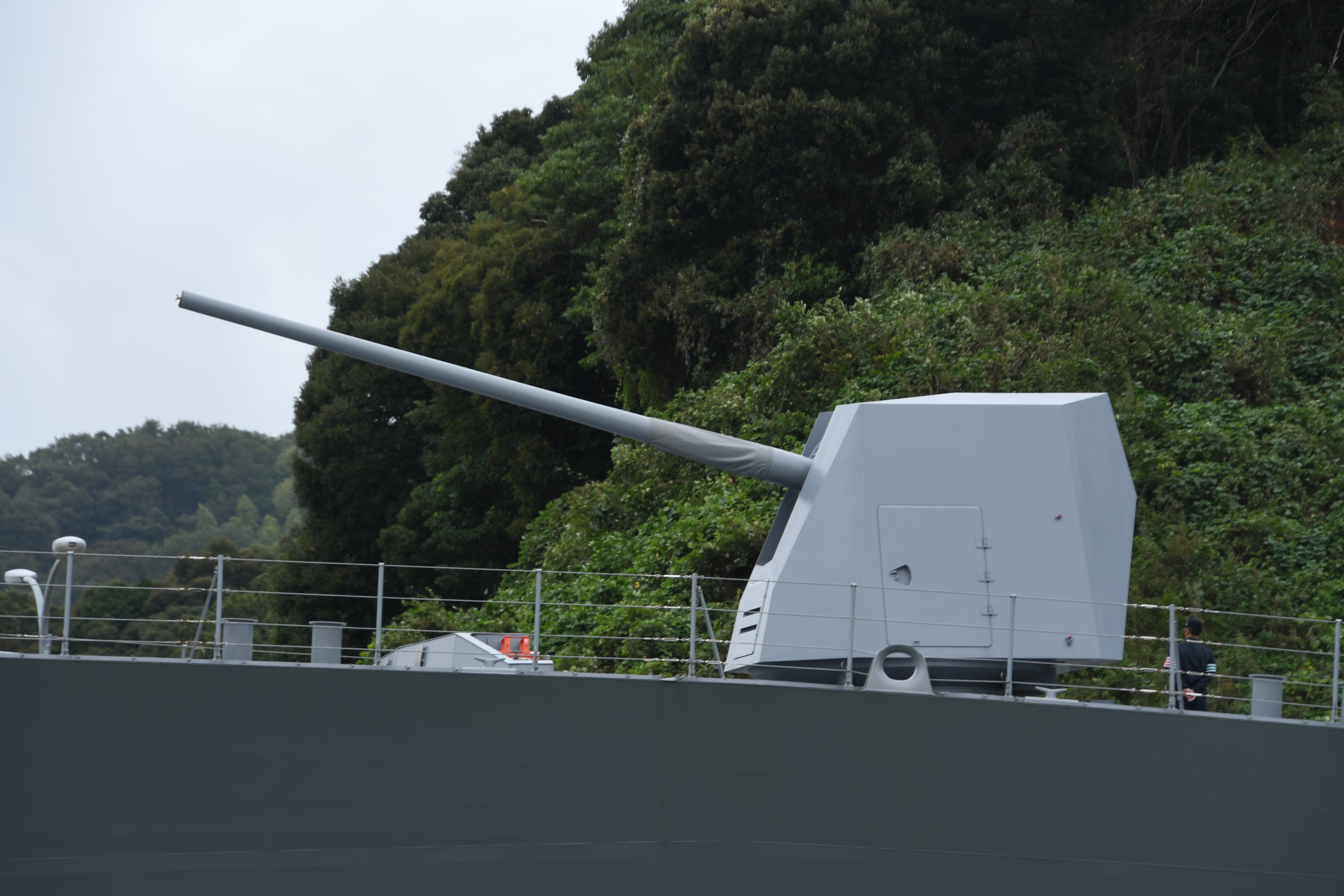
JS Shiranui at Yokosuka on 14 October 2019.

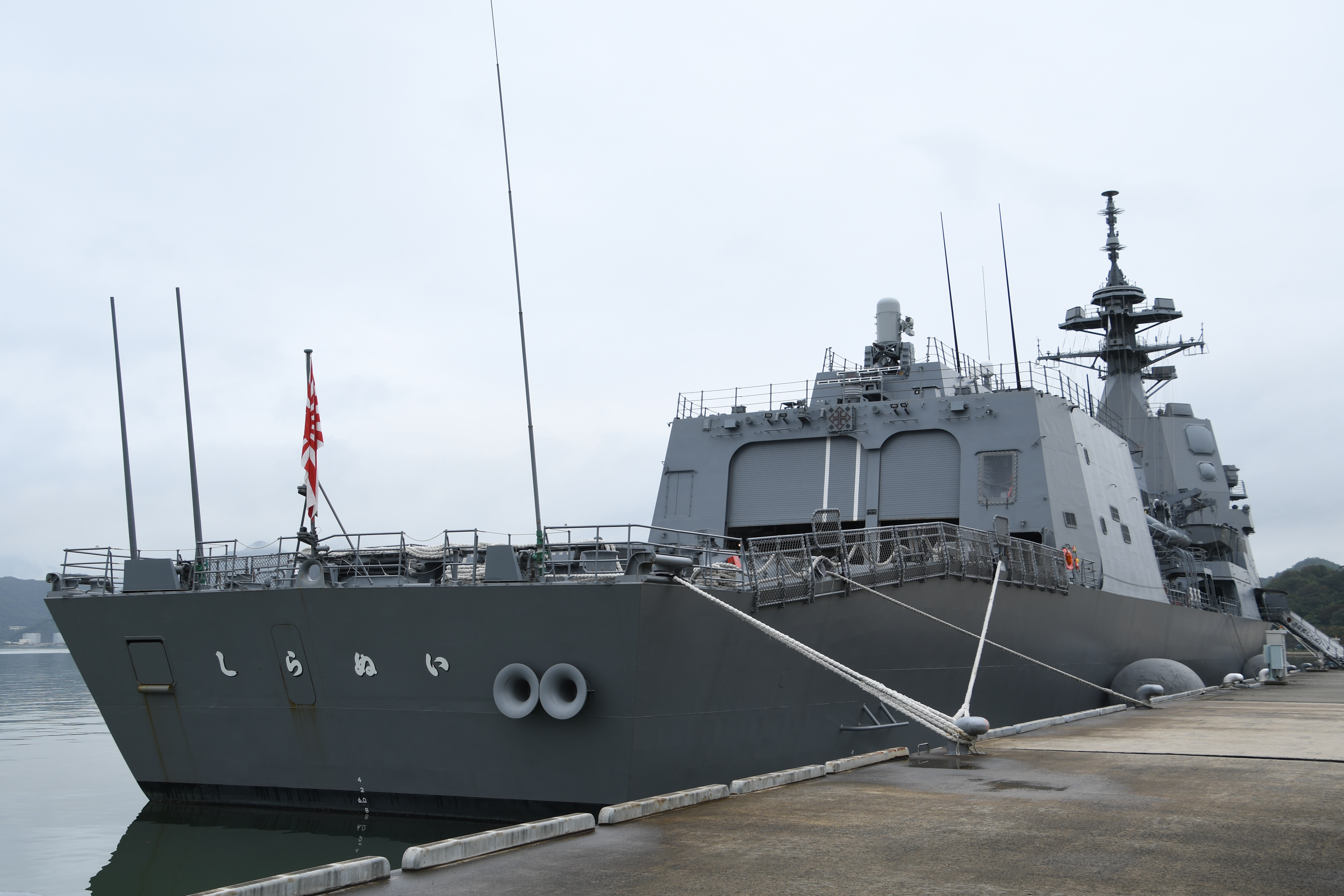
JS Shiranui at Yokosuka on 14 October 2019.

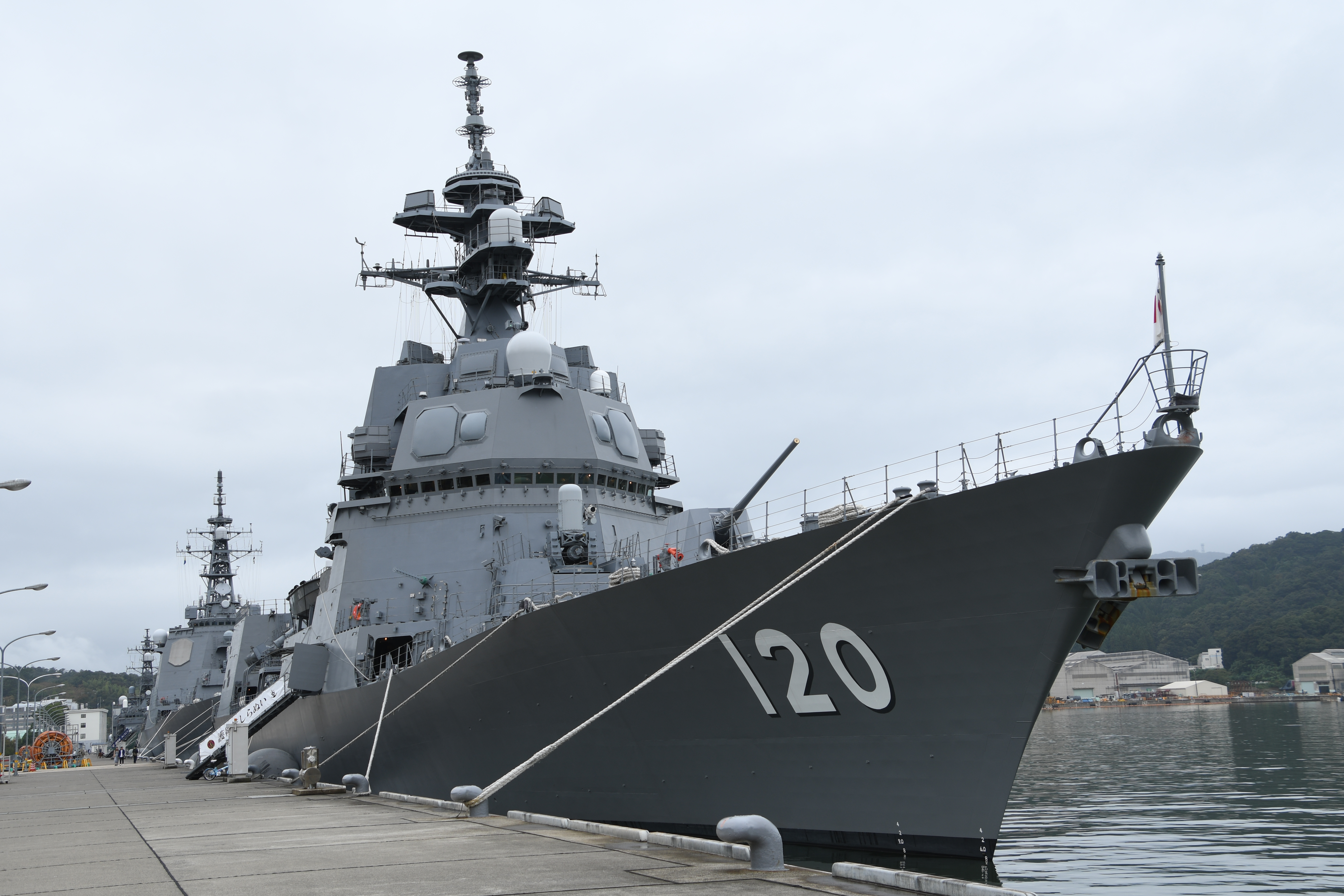
JS Shiranui at Yokosuka on 14 October 2019.

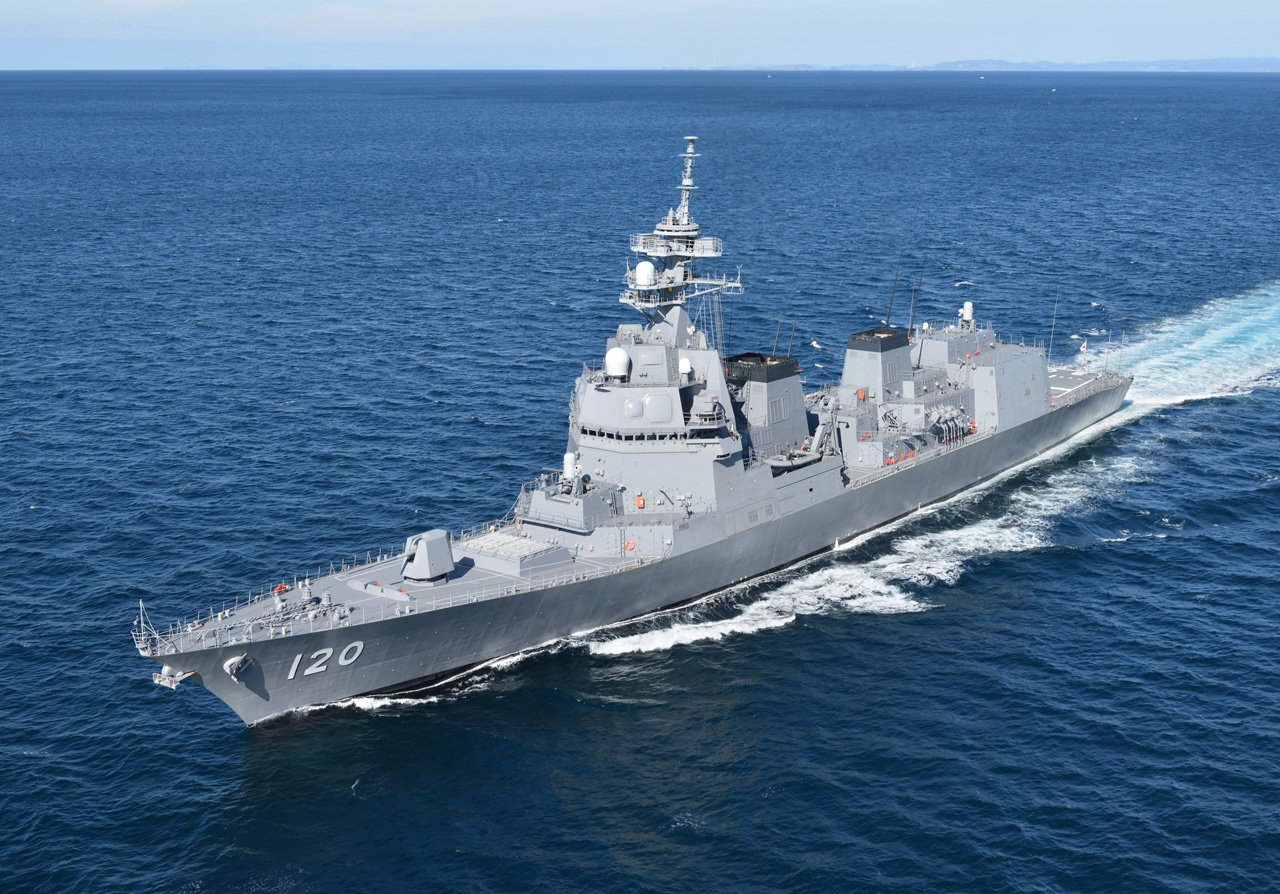
JS Shiranui underway, 7 November 2019.

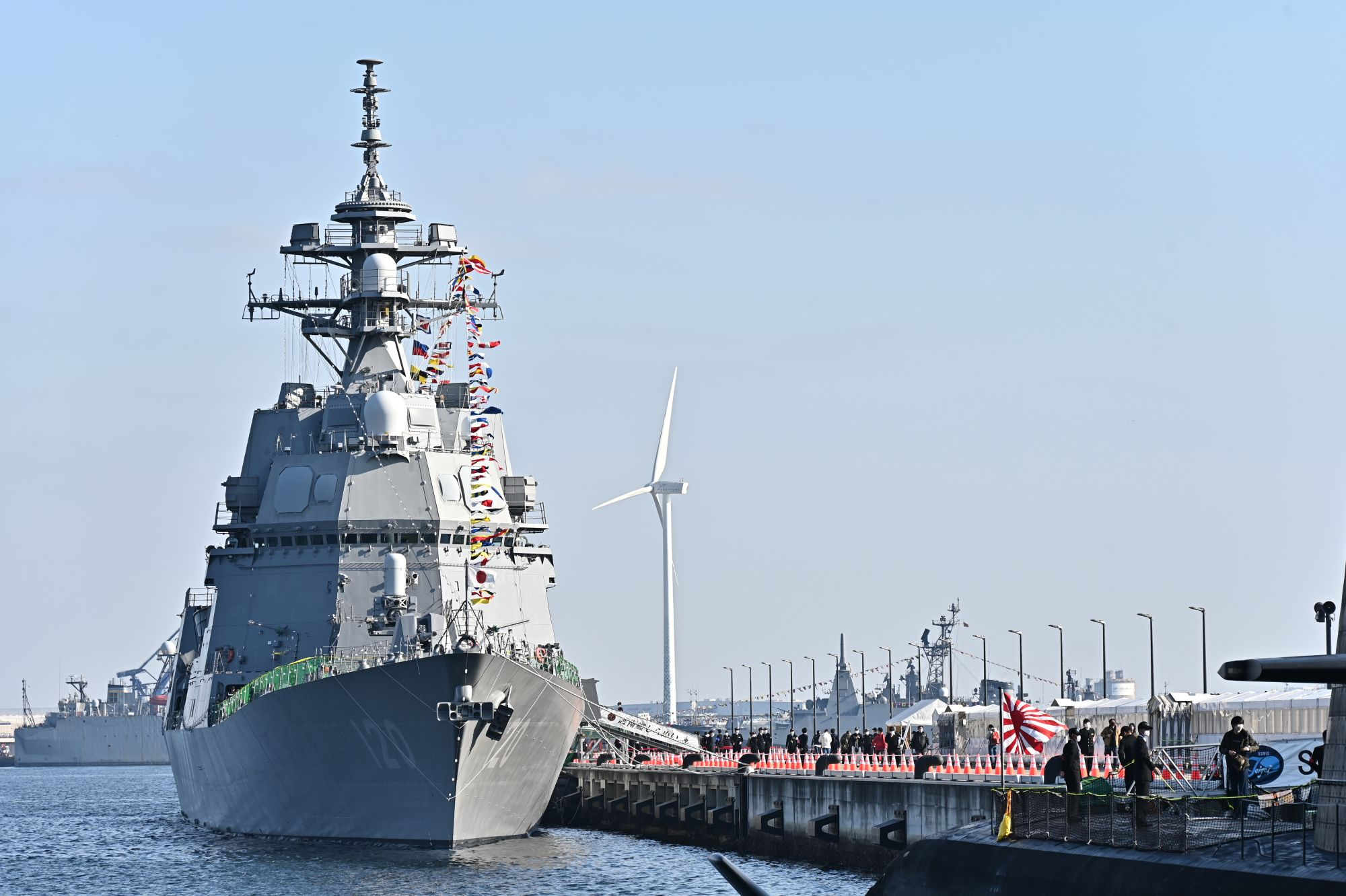
JS Shiranui in Yokohama, 4 November 2022

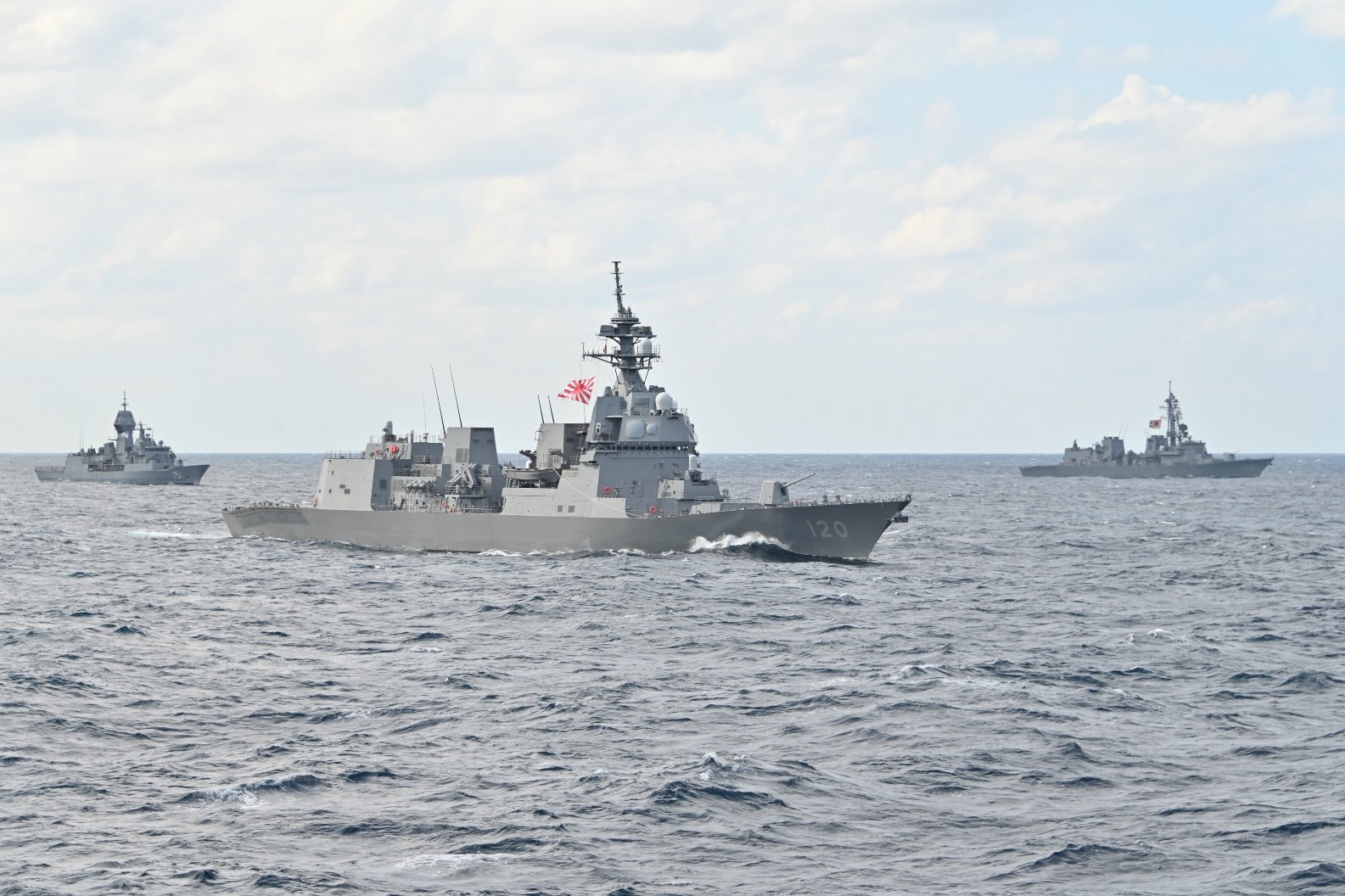
JS Shiranui sails in formation with JS Takanami and HMAS Arunta (FFH 151) during Malabar 2022
