= JS Akizuki =

Destroyer of the Japan Maritime Self-Defense Force

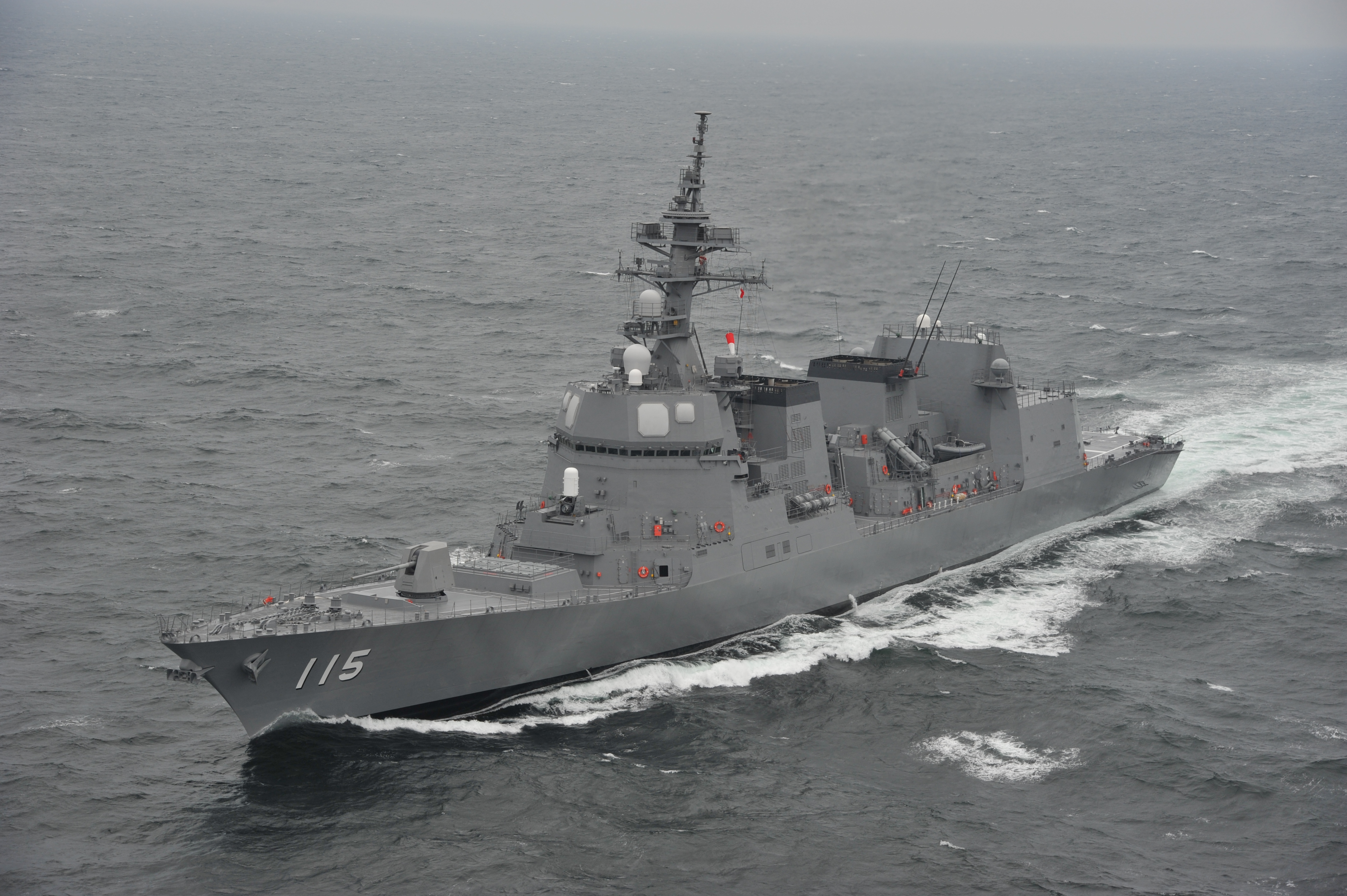
- JS Akizuki

History

Japan
- Name: Akizuki; (あきづき)
- Namesake: Akizuki (1959)
- Ordered: 2007
- Builder: Mitsubishi, Nagasaki
- Laid down: 17 July 2009
- Launched: 13 October 2010
- Commissioned: 14 March 2012
- Home port: Sasebo
- Identification: DD-115
- Status: Active

General characteristics
- Class & type: Akizuki-class destroyer
- Displacement: 5,000 tonnes standard; 6,800 tonnes full load
- Length: 150.5 m (493 ft 9 in)
- Beam: 18.3 m (60 ft 0 in)
- Draft: 5.3 m (17 ft 5 in)
- Depth: 10.9 m (35 ft 9 in)
- Propulsion: COGAG, two shafts, four Rolls-Royce Spey SM1C turbines
- Speed: 30 knots (56 km/h; 35 mph)
- Complement: 200
- Sensors & processing systems: ATECS (advanced technology command system); OYQ-11 ACDS; FCS-3A AAW system; OQQ-22 ASW system; NOLQ-3D EW system; OPS-20C surface search radar
- Armament: 1 × Mk. 45 Mod 4 127 mm (5 in)/62 gun; 8 × Type 90 Anti-ship missile; 2 × 20 mm Phalanx Block1B CIWS; 2 × HOS-303 triple 324 mm (12.8 in) torpedo tubes; Anti-Torpedo system; 32-cell Mk. 41 Vertical Launching System: RIM-162 ESSM SAM; RUM-139 VL-ASROC (DD 115); Type 07 VL-ASROC (DD 116 to DD 118)
- Aircraft carried: 1 × SH-60K helicopter

JS Akizuki (DD-115) is the lead ship of Akizuki-class destroyers, operated by the Japan Maritime Self-Defense Force. She was commissioned on 14 March 2012.

== Construction and career ==
Akizuki was laid down at Mitsubishi Heavy Industries Nagasaki Shipyard & Machinery Works on July 17, 2009, as the 2007 plan 5,000-ton type escort ship No. 2244 based on the medium-term defense capability development plan, launched and named on October 13, 2010. Launch, the public trial started on July 28, 2011, commissioned on March 14, 2012, and was incorporated into the 5th escort group of the 1st escort group. The fixed port is Sasebo base.

On July 5, 2015, as the 22nd dispatched anti-piracy action surface corps, sailed from Sasebo base to the Gulf of Aden off the coast of Somalia with JS Sawagiri.

On April 18, 2021, she departed from Sasebo base as the 5th dispatch information gathering activity water squadron. In addition to conducting PCR tests on all crew members, we plan to conduct training, etc. for 14 days in the waters near Japan, observe the health of the crew members, and then advance toward the Middle East. Take over the mission from "Suzunami".

== Gallery ==
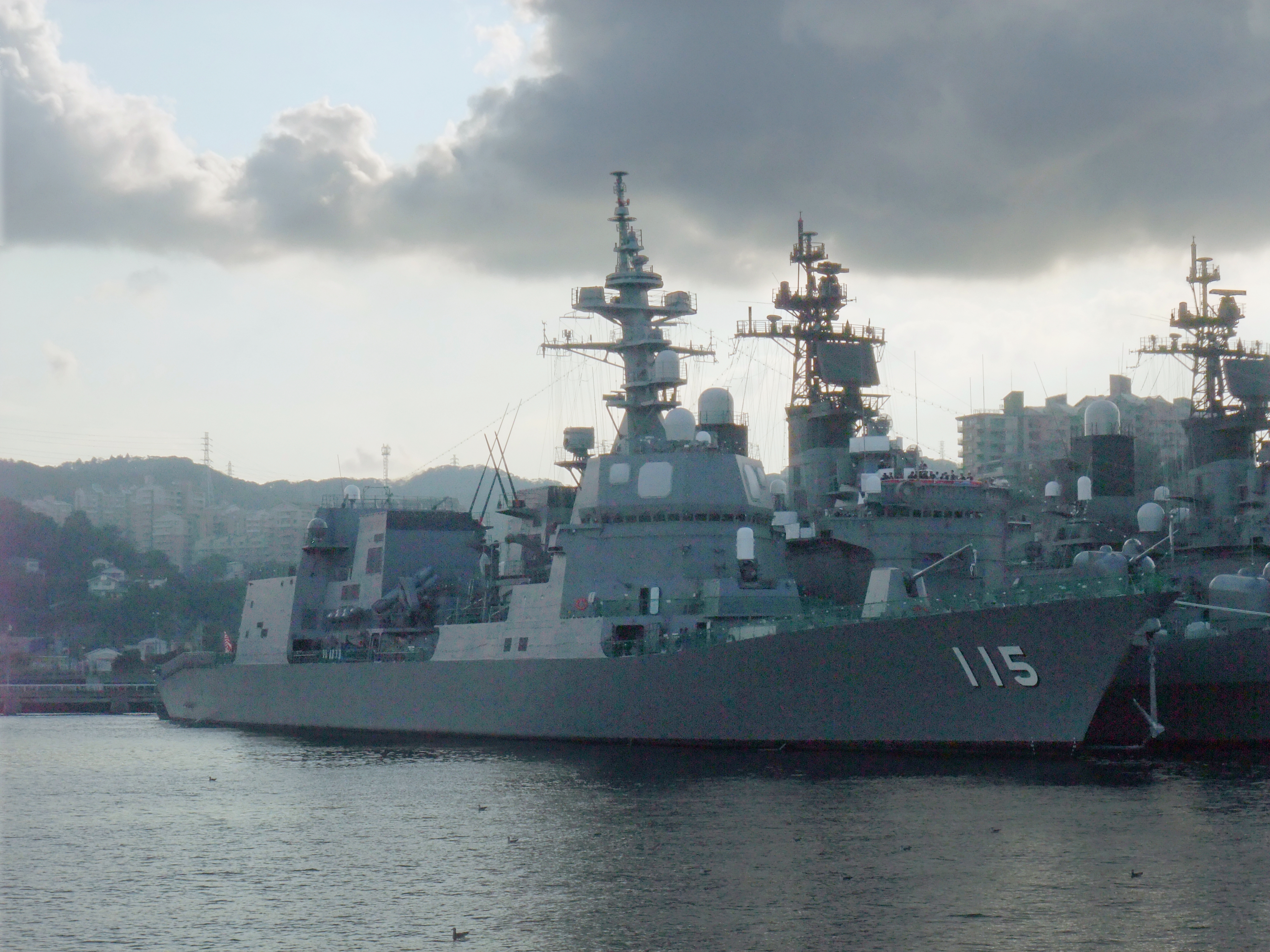
JS Akizuki at Yokosuka preparing for observing ceremony on 6 October 2012.

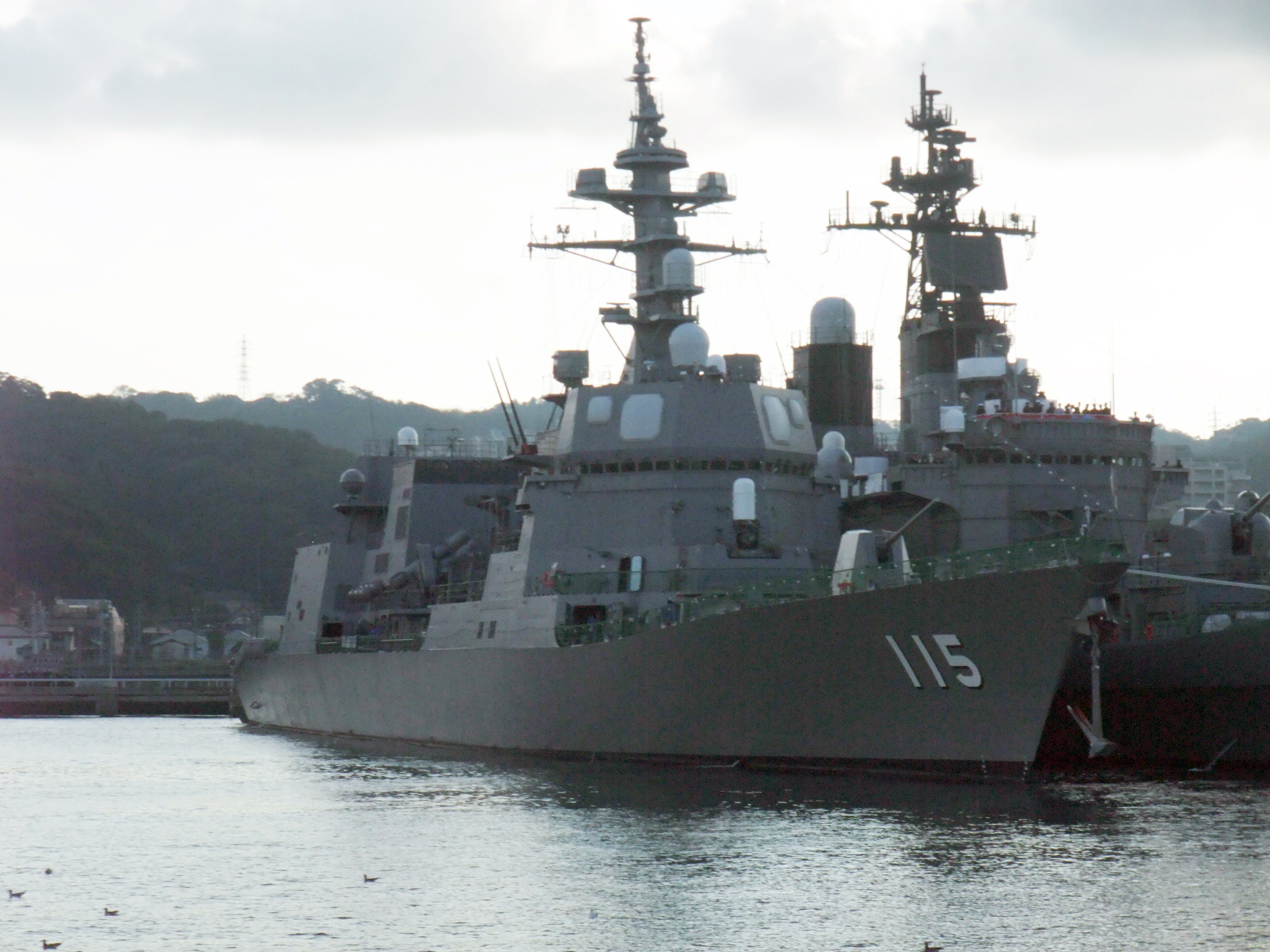
JS Akizuki at Yokosuka preparing for observing ceremony on 6 October 2012.

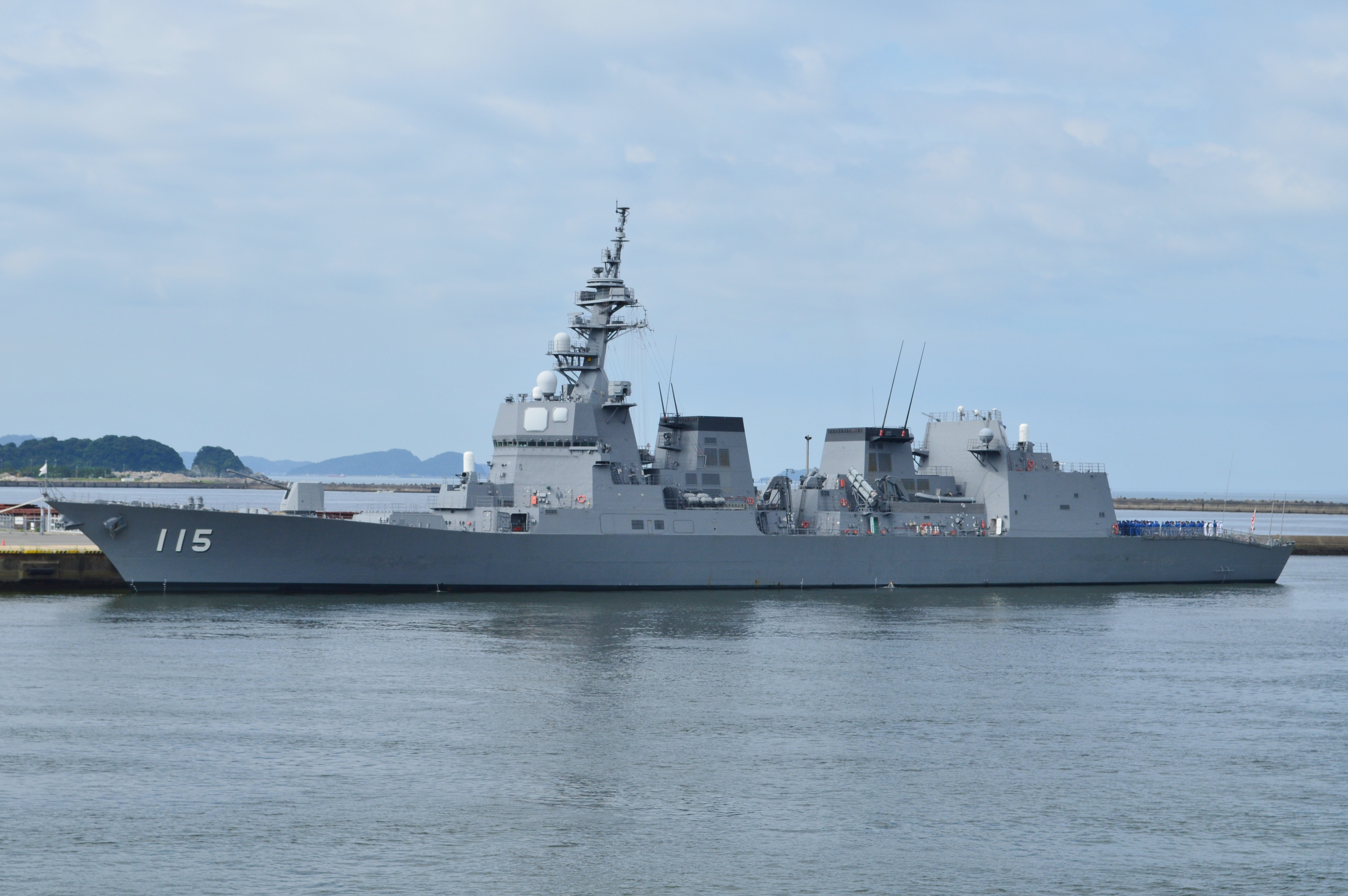
JS Akizuki at Wakayama on 16 July 2016.

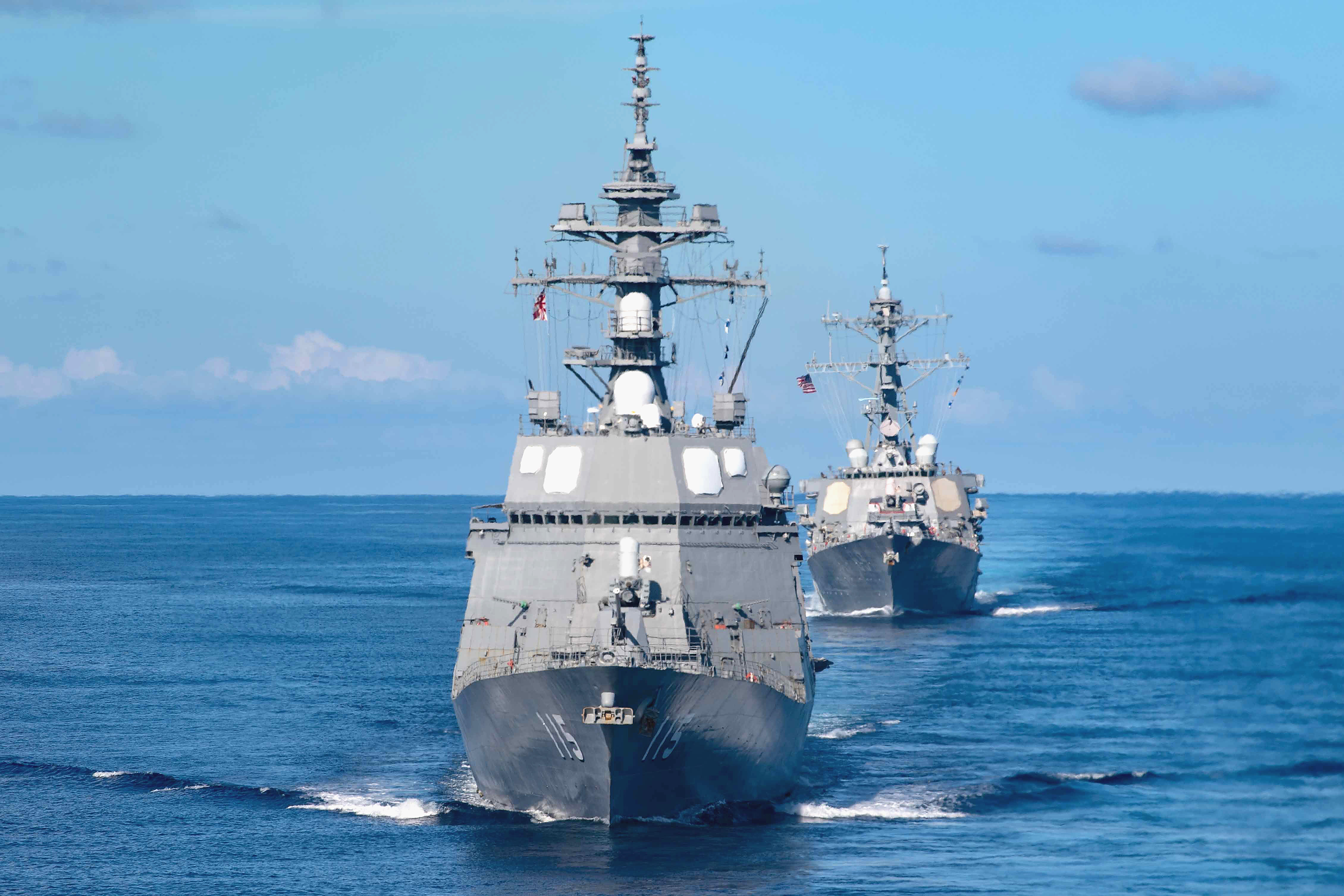
JS Akizuki and USS Milius transit the South China Sea, 26 October 2021.

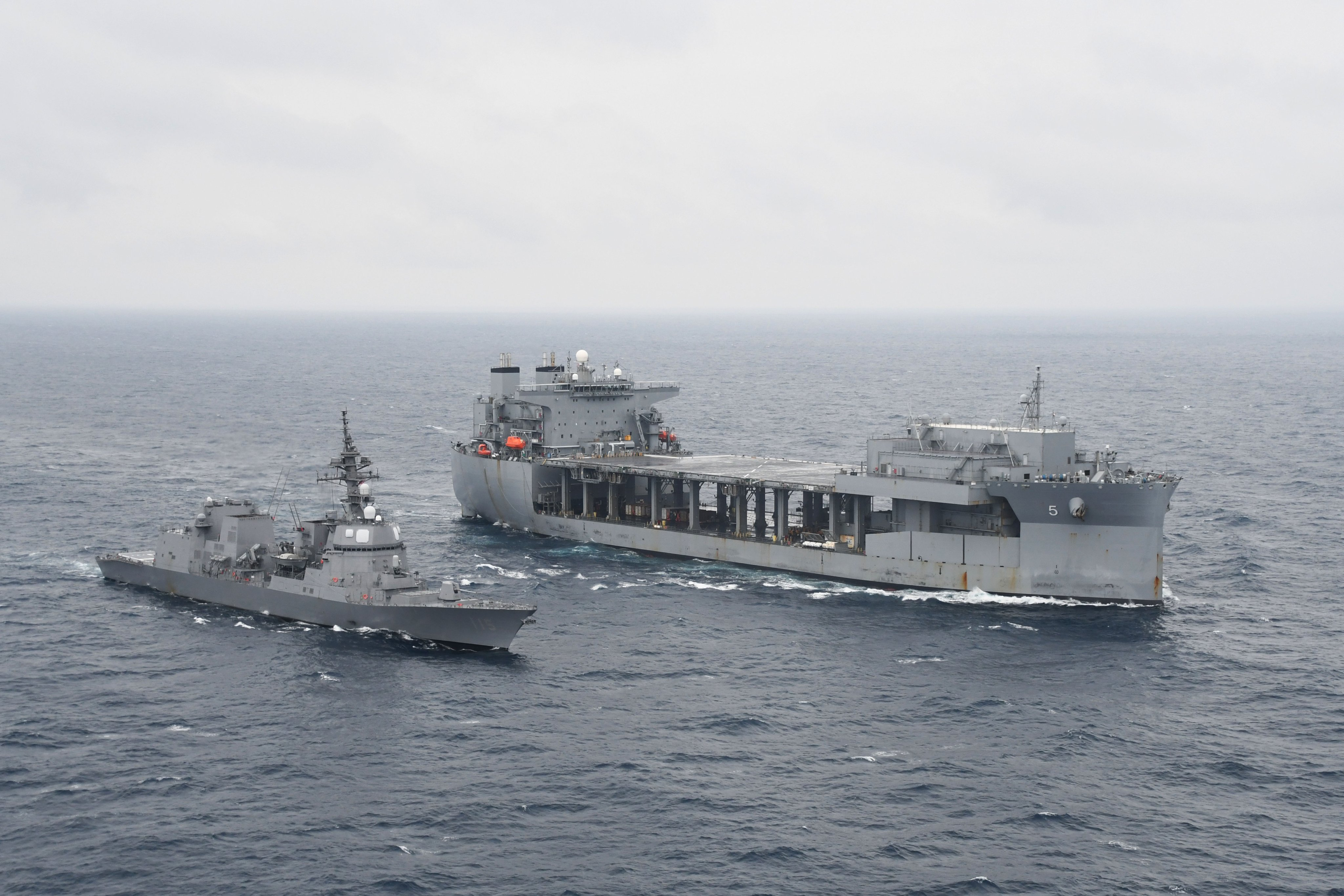
JS Akizuki with USS Miguel Keith during Noble Raven 24, 12 May 2024.
