= JS Asahi =

Asahi-class destroyer

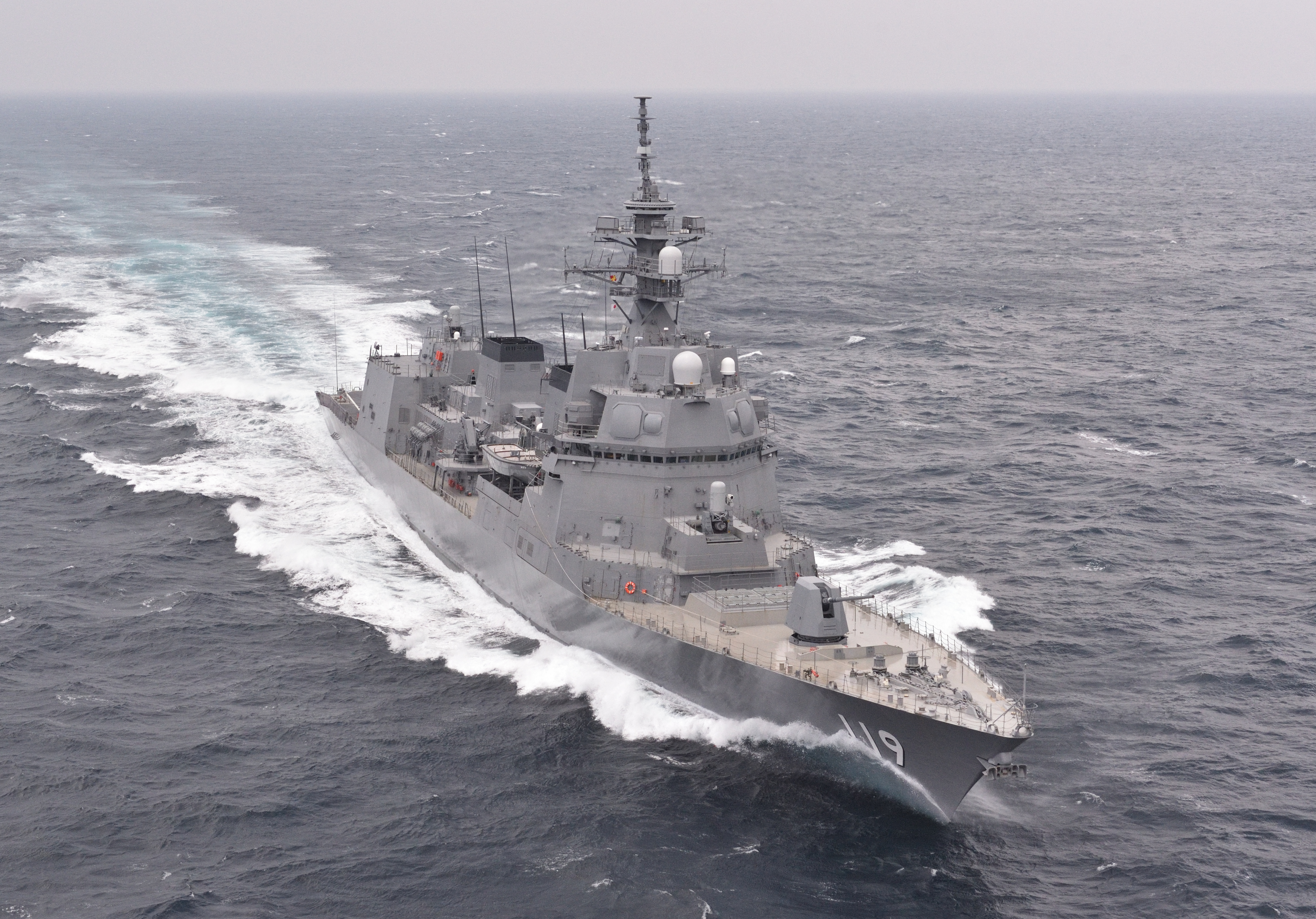
- JS Asahi underway on 4 December 2017.

History

Japan
- Name: Asahi; (あさひ)
- Namesake: Asahi
- Owner: Japan Maritime Self-Defense Force
- Builder: Mitsubishi Heavy Industries, Nagasaki
- Laid down: 4 August 2015
- Launched: 19 October 2016
- Commissioned: 7 March 2018
- Identification: Pennant number: DD-119
- Status: Active

General characteristics
- Class & type: Asahi-class destroyer
- Displacement: 5,100 tonnes standard; 6,800 tonnes full load
- Length: 151 m (495 ft 5 in)
- Beam: 18.3 m (60 ft 0 in)
- Draft: 5.4 m (17 ft 9 in)
- Depth: 10.9 m (35 ft 9 in)
- Propulsion: COGLAG, two shafts, two GE LM2500 turbines
- Speed: 30 kn (56 km/h; 35 mph)
- Complement: 230
- Sensors & processing systems: OYQ-13 ACDS; FCS-3A AAW system; OPY-1 AAW system; OQQ-24 ASW system; OQR-4 Towed sonar array system; NOLQ-3D-2 EW system; OPS-48 surface search radar
- Armament: 1 × Mk. 45 Mod 4 127 mm (5 in)/62 gun; 8 × Type 90 Anti-ship missile in quad canisters; 2 × 20 mm Phalanx Block1B CIWS; 2 × HOS-303 triple 324 mm (12.8 in) torpedo tubes; Anti-torpedo System; 32-cell Mk. 41 Vertical launching system; RIM-162 ESSM SAM; RUM-139 VL-ASROC; Type 07 VL-ASROC
- Aircraft carried: 1 × SH-60K helicopter

JS Asahi (DD-119) is the lead ship of the Asahi-class destroyer of the Japanese Maritime Self-Defense Force. Her namesake came from “Morning sun”.

== Development ==
The procurement of the destroyer began in 2013 in response to the reduction in the number of destroyers (namely the Hatsuyuki class) within the JMSDF. The two major characteristics of this destroyer is its bigger emphasis on anti-submarine warfare and the adoption of the COGLAG (combined gas turbine electric and gas turbine) propulsion system. A second destroyer was procured a year later.

== Construction and career ==
She was laid down on 4 August 2015 and launched on 19 October 2016. Commissioned on 7 March 2018 with the hull number DD-119.

On 21 May 2022, the Asahi, the JS Makinami (DD-112), and the replenishment oiler, JS Hamana (AOE-424) sighted the PLAN Liaoning carrier strike group going towards Miyako-jima.

On 1 March 2025, Asahi arrived at the Port of Colombo, Sri Lanka, for a replenishment visit under the command of Commander Shota Takashiro. The vessel departed the island on 3 March 2025 upon completing its mission.

The ship participated in the Japan-India Maritime Exercise (JAIMEX-25) with INS Sahyadri of the Indian Navy between 16 and 18 October 2025. Other Japanese ships, including Ōmi and Jinryū, also participated in the exercise. Sahyadri was on an operational deployment to the South China Sea and the Indo-Pacific and conducted a port call at the Yokosuka Naval Base.

== Gallery ==
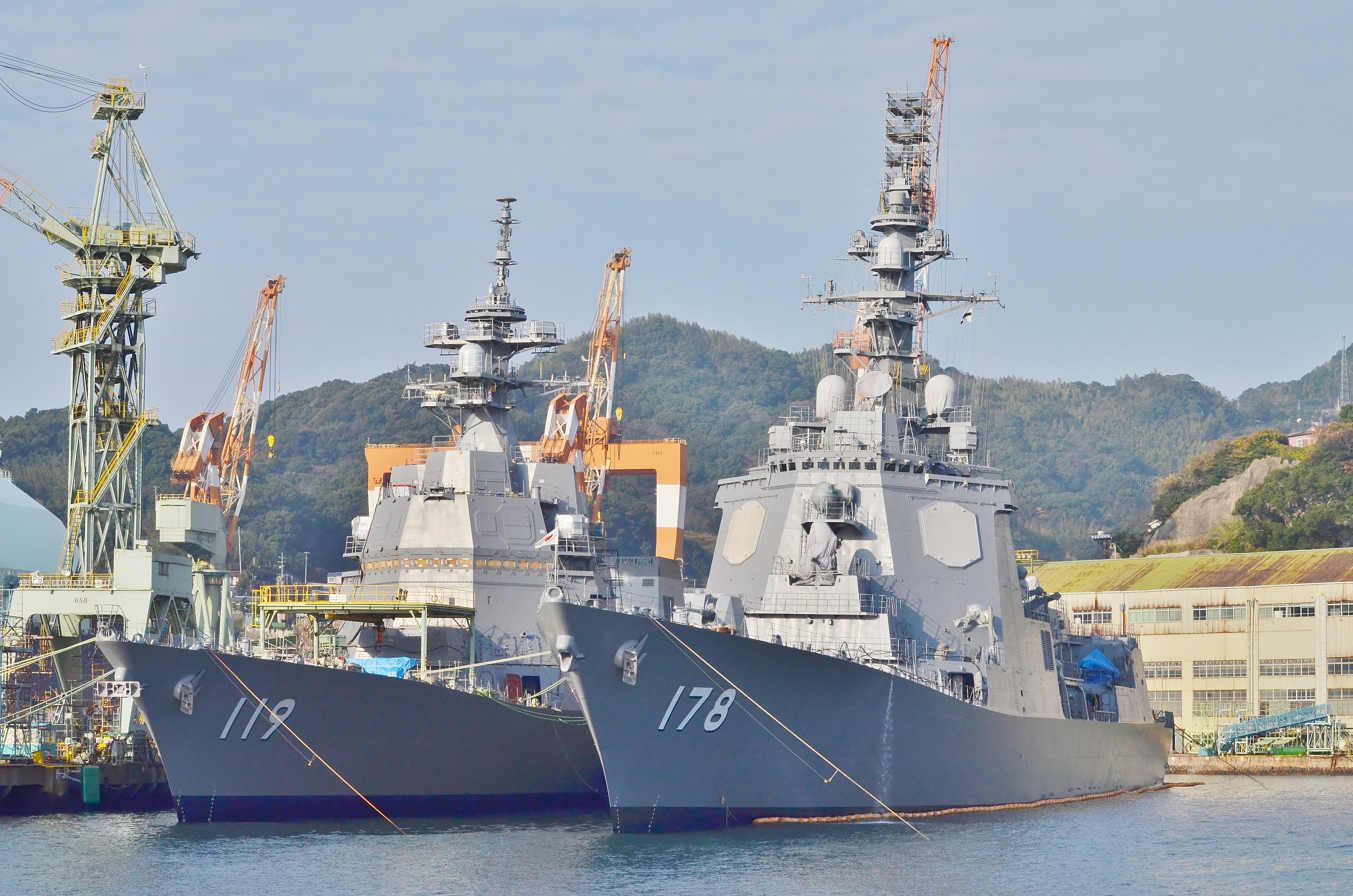
JS Asahi next to JS Ashigara at Mitsubishi Heavy Industries shipyard, Nagasaki on 2 January 2017.

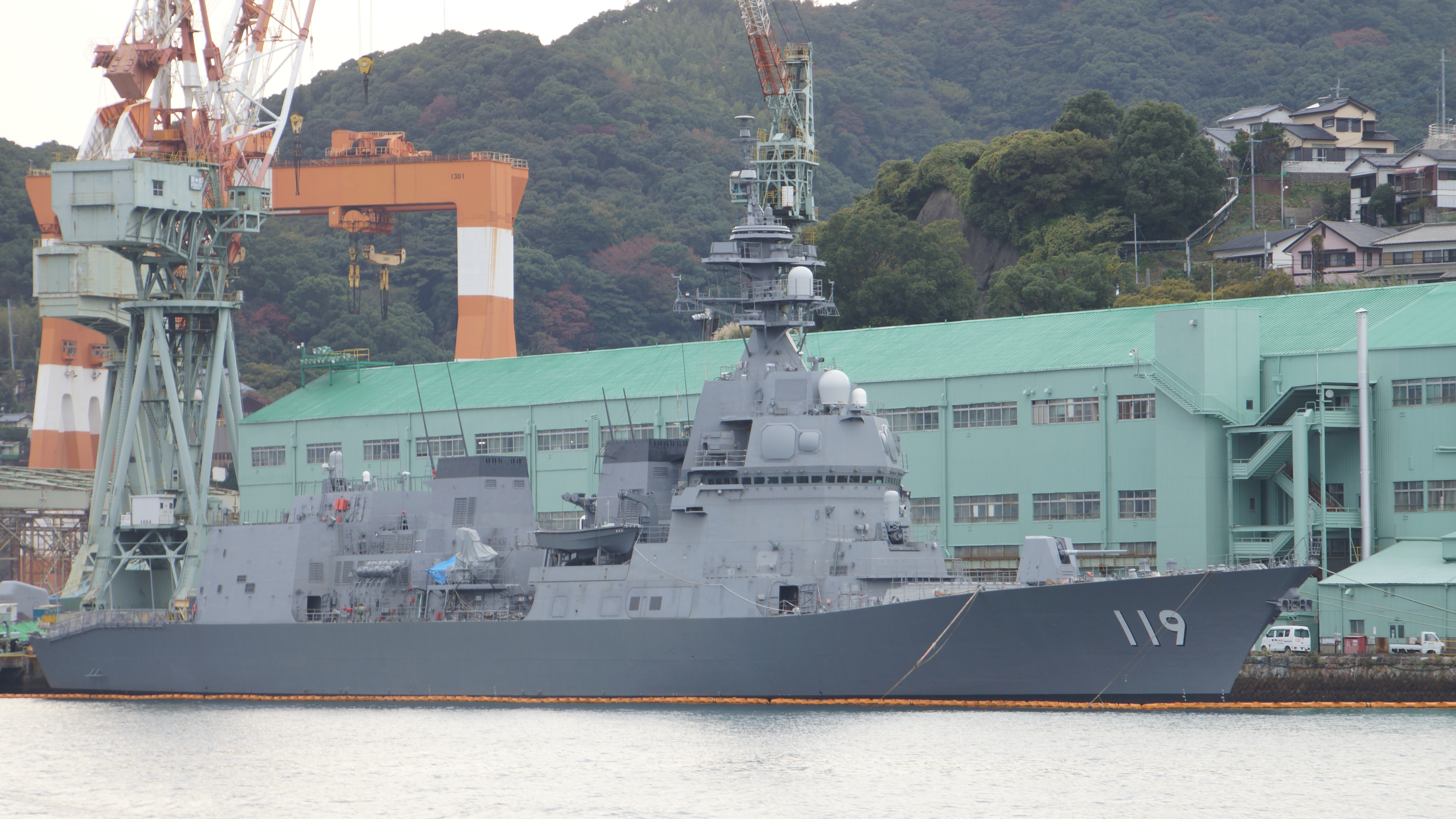
JS Asahi at Mitsubishi Heavy Industries shipyard, Nagasaki on 25 November 2017.

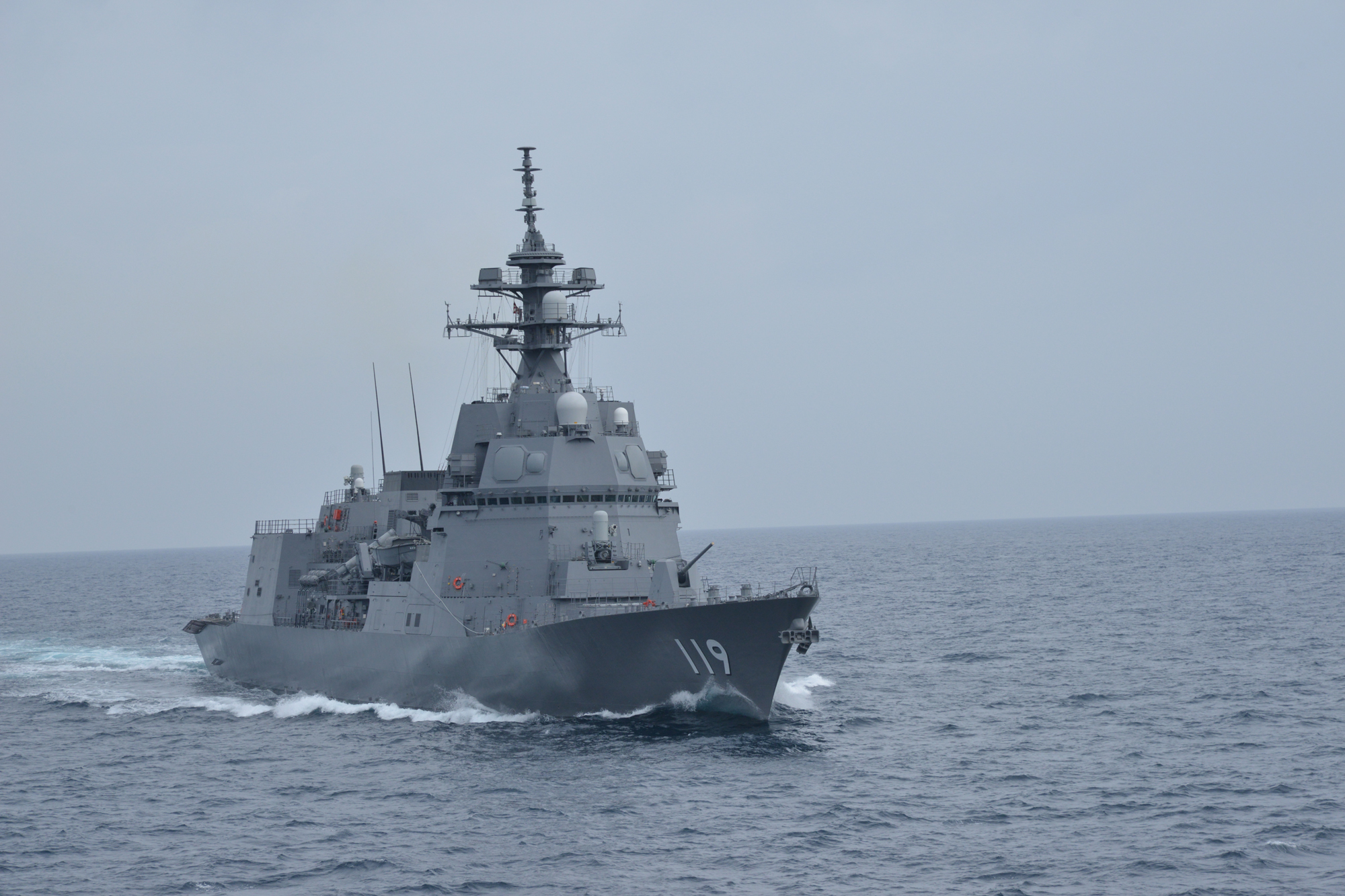
JS Asahi underway 29 August 2019.
