= Japanese ship Asahi =

Three warships of Japan have borne the name Asahi:

- Japanese battleship Asahi, a battleship launched in 1899 and sunk in 1942 after being converted to a submarine depot ship
- JDS Asahi, a Cannon-class destroyer escort launched in 1943 as USS Amick she was loaned to Japan between 1955 and 1975
- JS Asahi, an Asahi-class destroyer launched in 2016
