= Akizuki-class destroyer (2010) =

Class of the Japan Maritime Self-Defense Force

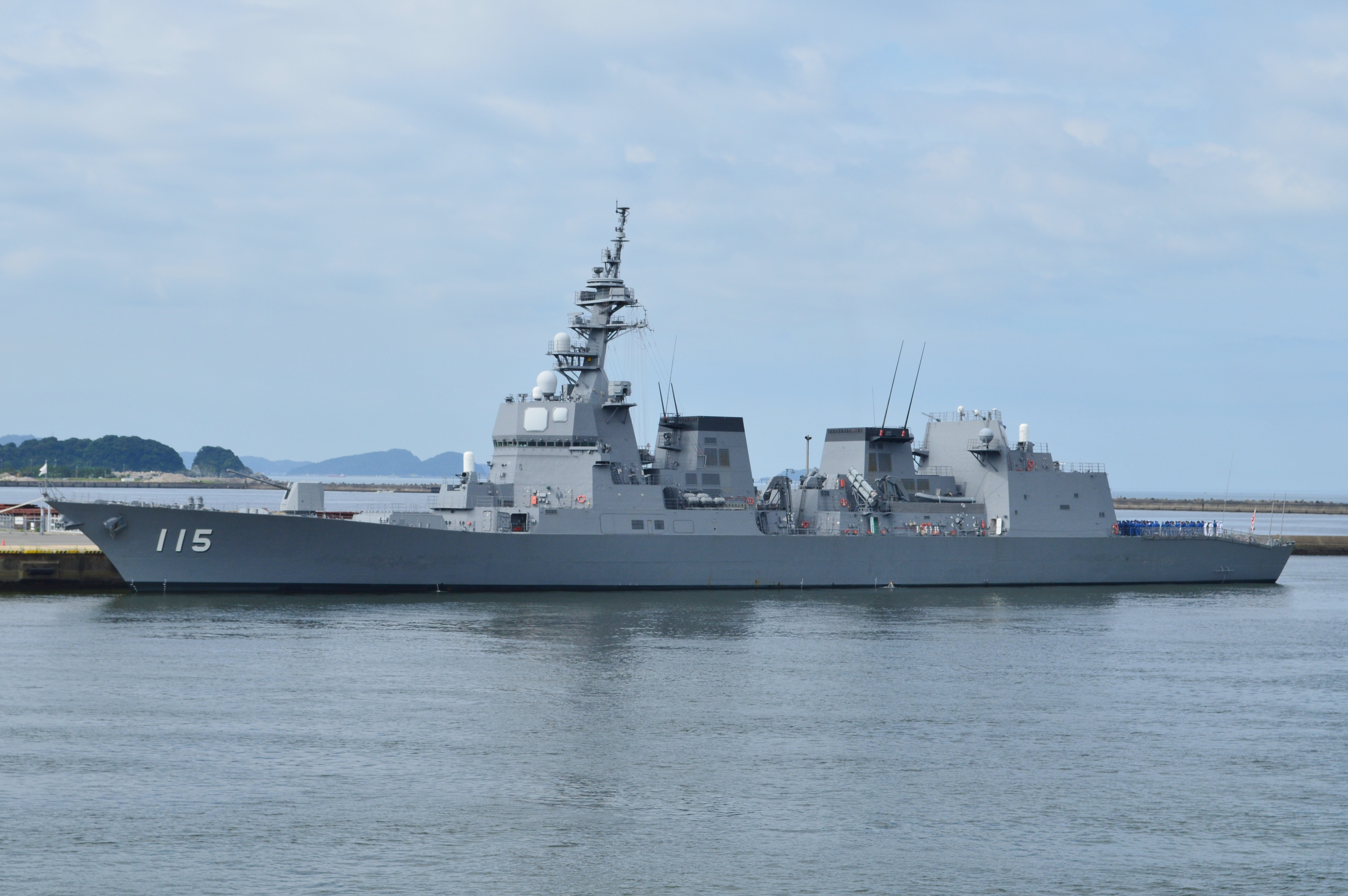
- DD-115 Akizuki in Wakayama

Class overview
- Builders: Mitsubishi Heavy Industries; Nagasaki Shipyard (3); Mitsui Engineering & Shipbuilding; Tamano Shipyard (1)
- Operators: Japan Maritime Self-Defense Force
- Preceded by: Takanami class
- Succeeded by: Asahi class
- Cost: DD115: JPY84.4 billion; $893 million (constant 2009 USD)
- Built: 2009–2012
- In commission: 2012–present
- Planned: 4
- Completed: 4
- Active: 4

General characteristics
- Type: Destroyer
- Displacement: 5,000 tonnes standard; 6,800 tonnes full load
- Length: 150.5 m (493 ft 9 in)
- Beam: 18.3 m (60 ft 0 in)
- Draft: 5.3 m (17 ft 5 in)
- Depth: 10.9 m (35 ft 9 in)
- Propulsion: COGAG, two shafts, four Rolls-Royce Spey SM1C turbines
- Speed: 30 knots (56 km/h; 35 mph)
- Complement: 200
- Sensors & processing systems: ATECS (advanced technology command system); OYQ-11 ACDS; FCS-3A AAW system; OQQ-22 ASW system; NOLQ-3D EW system; OPS-20C surface search radar
- Armament: 1 × Mk 45 Mod 4 127 mm (5 in)/54 gun; 8 × Type 90 Anti-ship missile; 2 × 20 mm Phalanx Block1B CIWS; 2 × HOS-303 triple 324 mm (12.8 in) torpedo tubes; Anti-Torpedo system; 32-cell Mk 41 Vertical Launching System: RIM-162 ESSM SAM; RUM-139 VL-ASROC (DD 115); Type 07 VL-ASROC (DD 116 to DD 118)
- Aircraft carried: 1 × SH-60K helicopter

The Akizuki class of destroyers of the Japan Maritime Self-Defense Force is intended to escort the Hyūga-class and Izumo-class helicopter-carrier destroyers, and safeguard the other Aegis-capable warships such as the Kongō class and Atago class. The destroyer provides defense against surface, airborne and undersea threats. The class was initially designated as "19DD", referring to a date on the Japanese calendar, specifically the 19th fiscal year of the Heisei period (2007).

== Design ==
JS Akizuki (DD-115) at Sagami bay, 2012

The hull structure was based on that of the Takanami-class destroyers. There are many small improvements, such as cleaner lines to reduce the radar signature and decoys for torpedoes; but the principal changes can be summed up as more powerful engines, sensors, sonar and the indigenous ATECS battle management system that has been called the Japanese AEGIS. The main gas turbine engines are standardized on a higher-powered version of the Rolls-Royce Spey SM1C, in contrast to the combination of Rolls-Royce SM1C and General Electric LM2500 turbines used in the Takanami class.

== Equipment ==
The purpose of this class is to shield the Kongō class from air, surface and subsurface threats. Main features of the class include enhanced C4ISR and Anti-Aircraft Warfare (AAW) capability, with an OYQ-11 advanced Combat Direction Sub-system (CDS) and FCS-3A AAW weapon sub-system.

OYQ-11
This is the first CDS adopting a fully distributed computing architecture to be implemented in general-purpose destroyers of the JMSDF. AN/UYQ-70 workstations form the basic computing platform, with Link 16 datalinks. In addition to the CDS, this class is equipped with SATCOM terminals linked to Superbird satellites, part of the Maritime Operation Force (MOF) system. The MOF system is the operational C4I system used in the fleet of the JMSDF, based on the ILOG architecture and interoperable with other JSDF forces. There are also USC-42 DAMA terminals for GCCS-M, the American counterpart of the MOF system.

FCS-3A
This is a domestically developed AAW combat system. It consists of two main components, one is a dual-band and multimode active electronically scanned array radar, and the other is the fire-control system. The FCS-3A is the derivative of the FCS-3 of the Hyūga-class helicopter destroyer, changing material of its transmitter-receiver modules from gallium arsenide to gallium nitride and introducing additional Local Area Defense (LAD) capability. An ESSM SAM VLS is integrated with the FCS-3A.

Anti-submarine and Electronic Warfare (EW) capabilities of the Akizuki class have been enhanced, with a new OQQ-22 integrated sonar suite sub-system (hull-sonar and OQR-3 towed array; – a Japanese equivalent of the American AN/SQQ-89), and the NOLQ-3D digitalized EW suite sub-system. These sub-systems communicate across a NOYQ-1B wide area network. These systems are comparable to those of the Zumwalt-class destroyer.

== Gallery ==
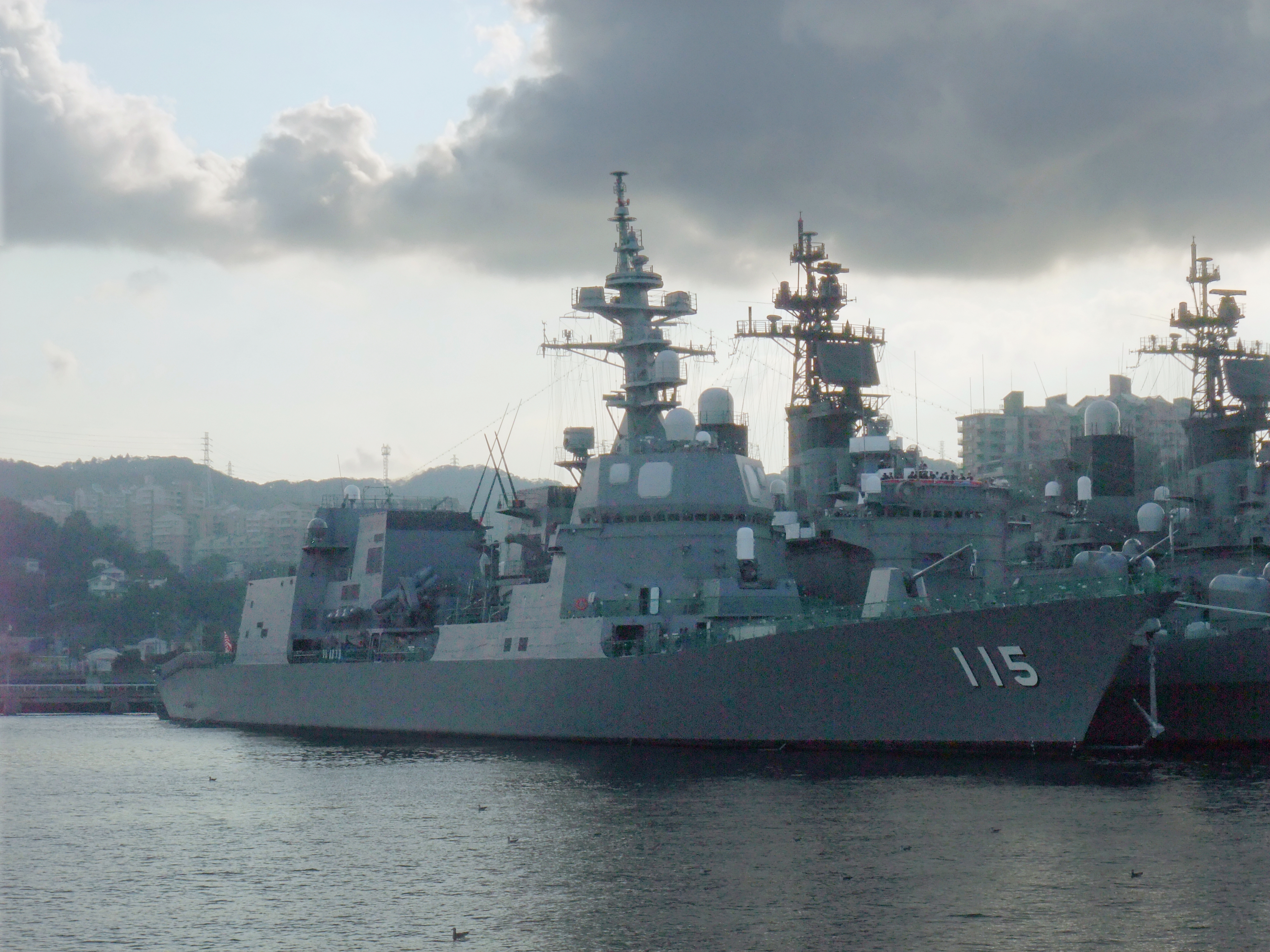
Starboard view JS Akizuki

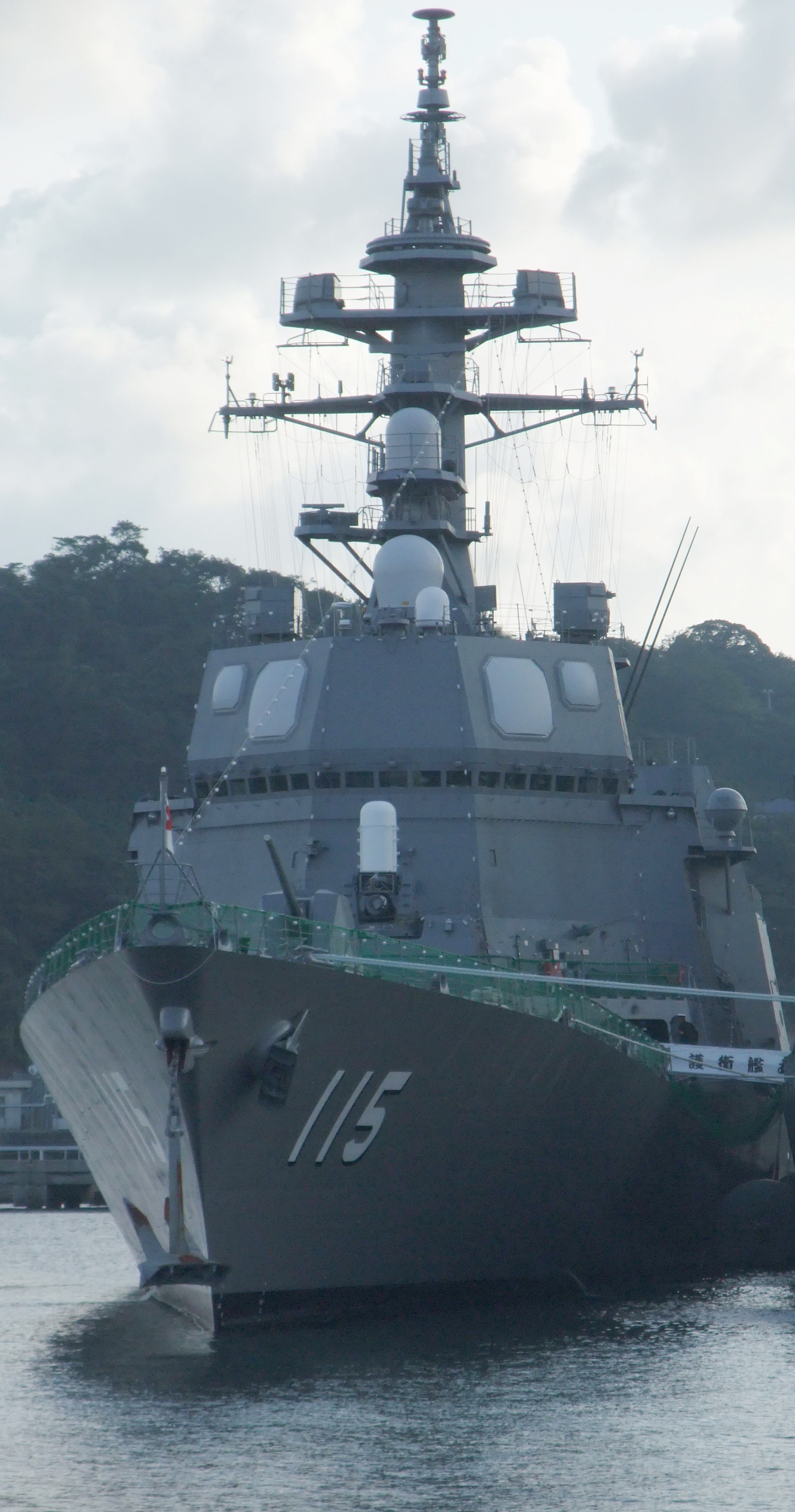
Bow view

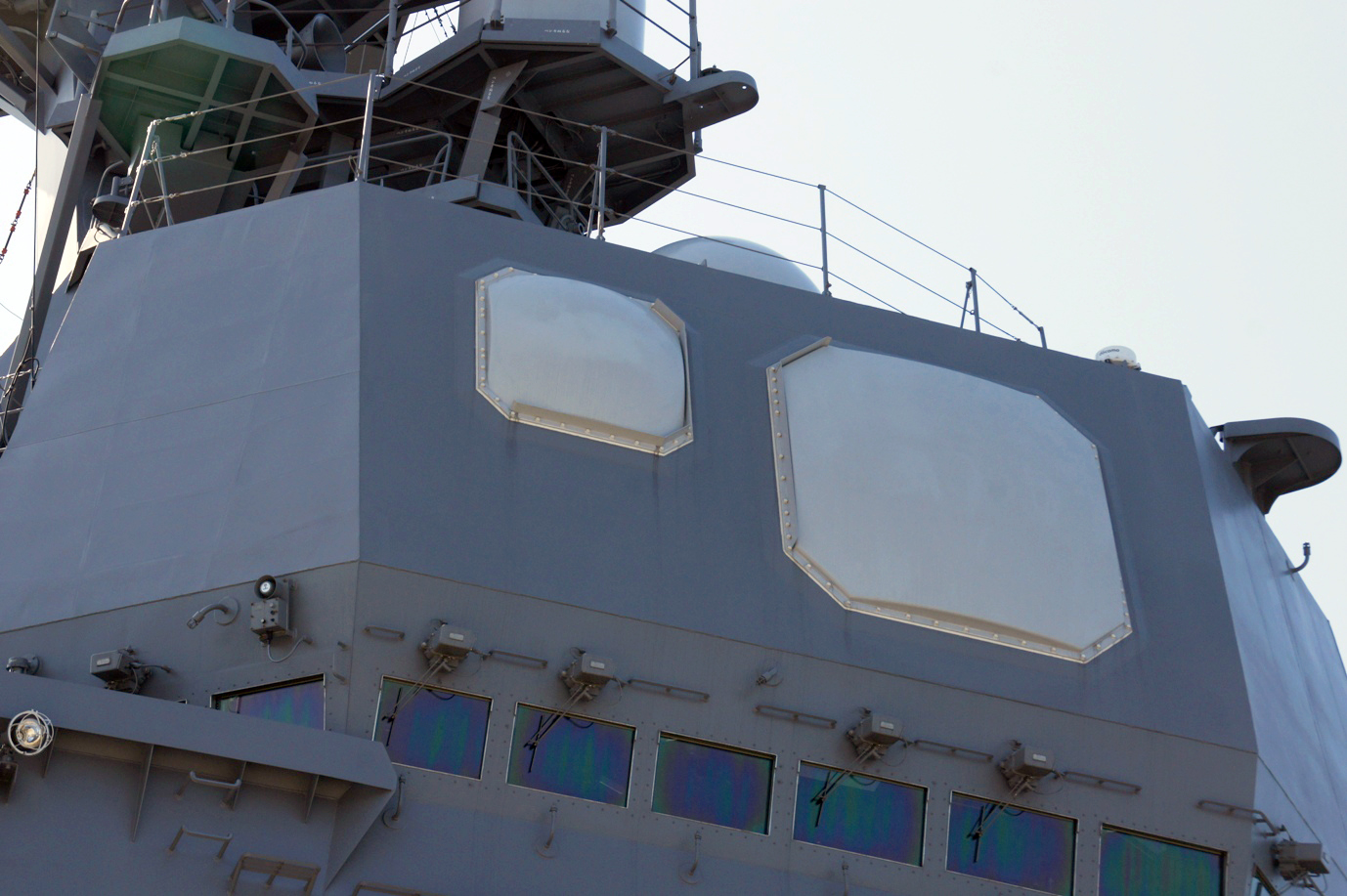
Bridge detail with 2 AESA arrays

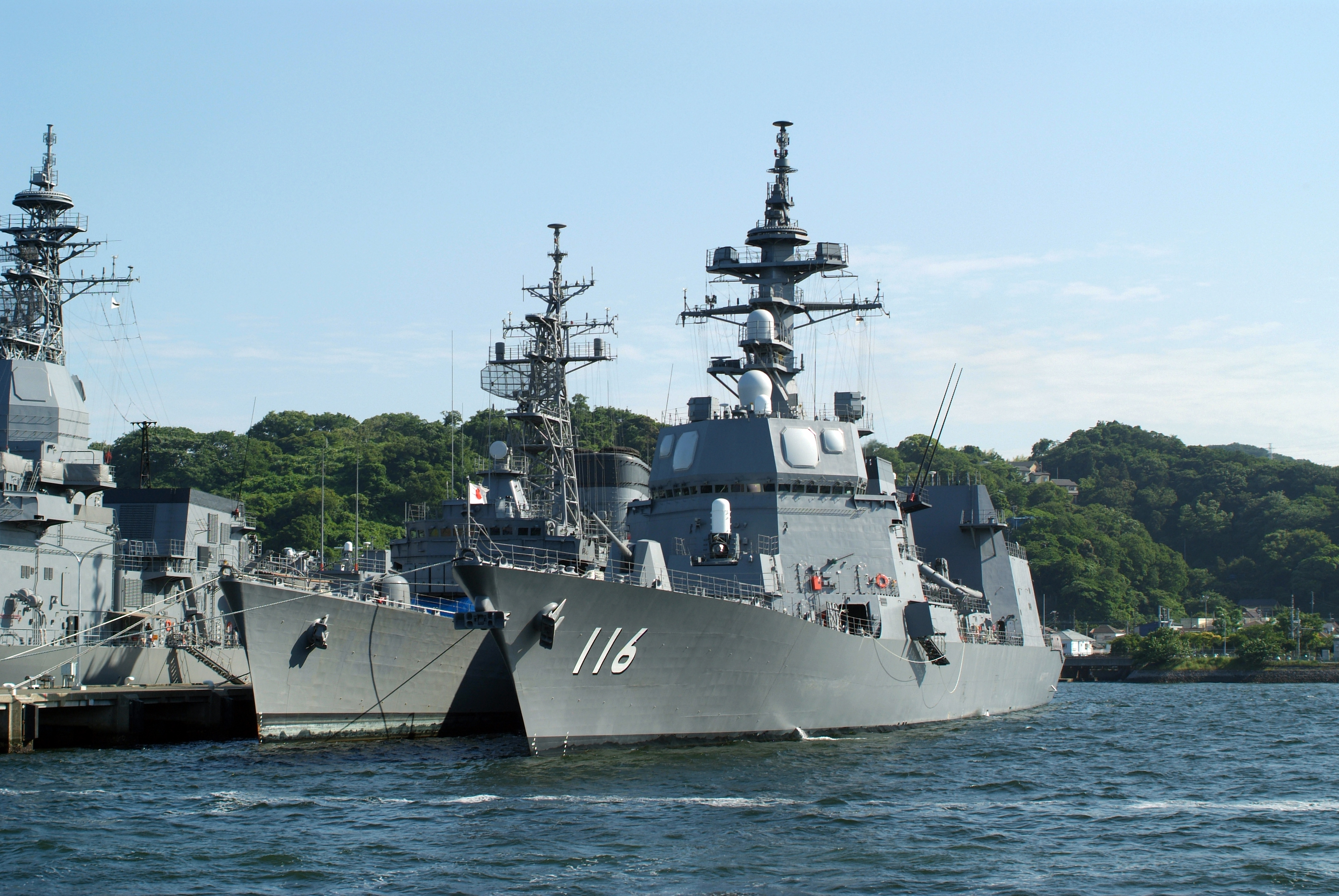
JS Teruzuki at Yokosuka naval base, 2013

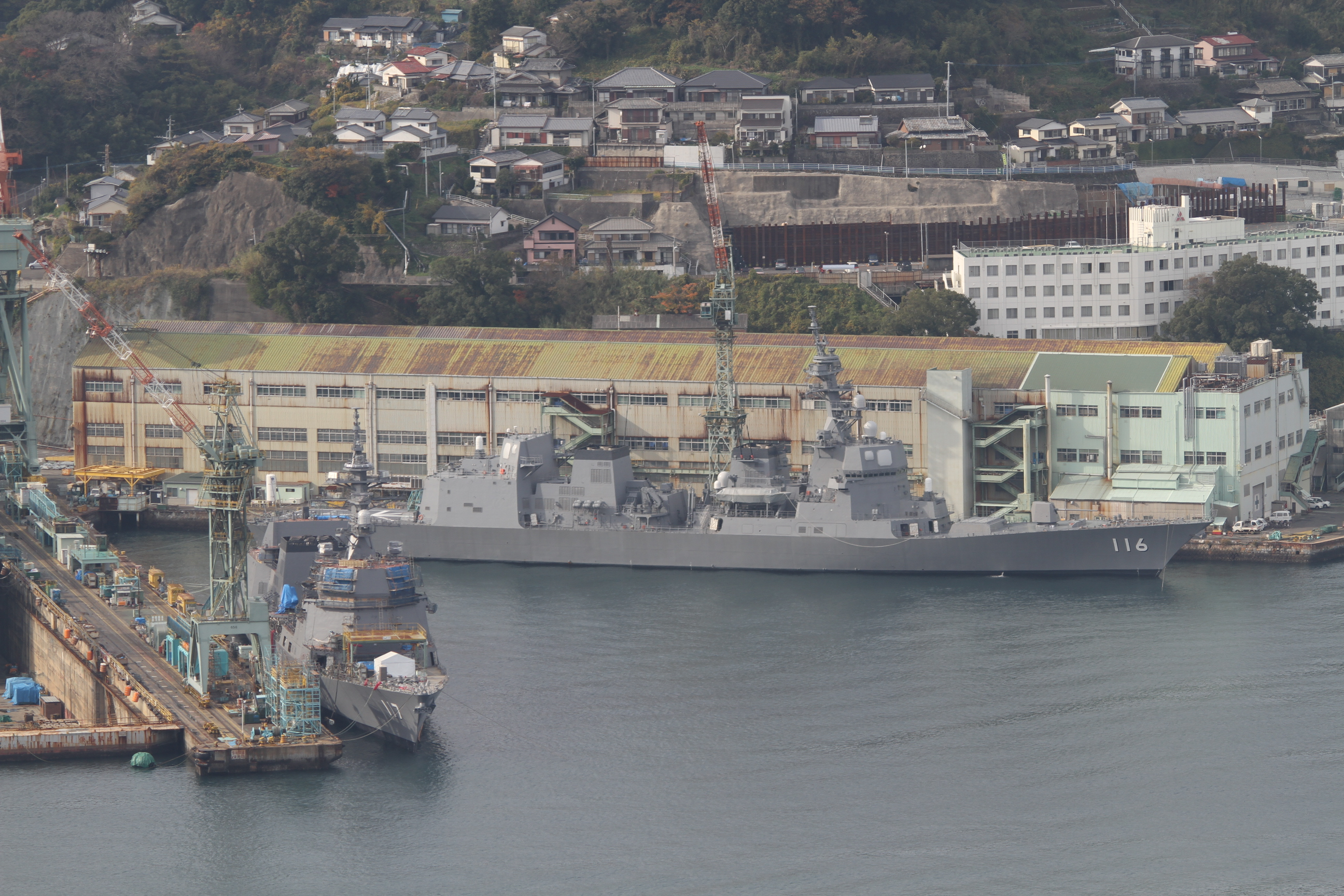
JS Teruzuki (DD-116) and JS Suzutsuki (DD-117) at Nagasaki shipyard

== Ships in the class ==
Building no.	Pennant no.	Name/Namesake	Laid down	Launched	Commissioned	Shipyard
2244	DD-115	Akizuki (Autumn Moon)	17 July 2009	13 October 2010	14 March 2012	MHI, Nagasaki
2245	DD-116	Teruzuki (Bright Moon)	2 June 2010	15 September 2011	7 March 2013	MHI, Nagasaki
2246	DD-117	Suzutsuki (Clear Moon)	18 May 2011	17 October 2012	12 March 2014	MHI, Nagasaki
2247	DD-118	Fuyuzuki (Winter Moon)	14 June 2011	22 August 2012	13 March 2014	Mitsui, Tamano

== See also ==
- List of destroyer classes in service

Equivalent destroyers of the same era

- Type 051C
