= Asahi-class destroyer =

Destroyer class of the Japan Maritime Self-Defense Force

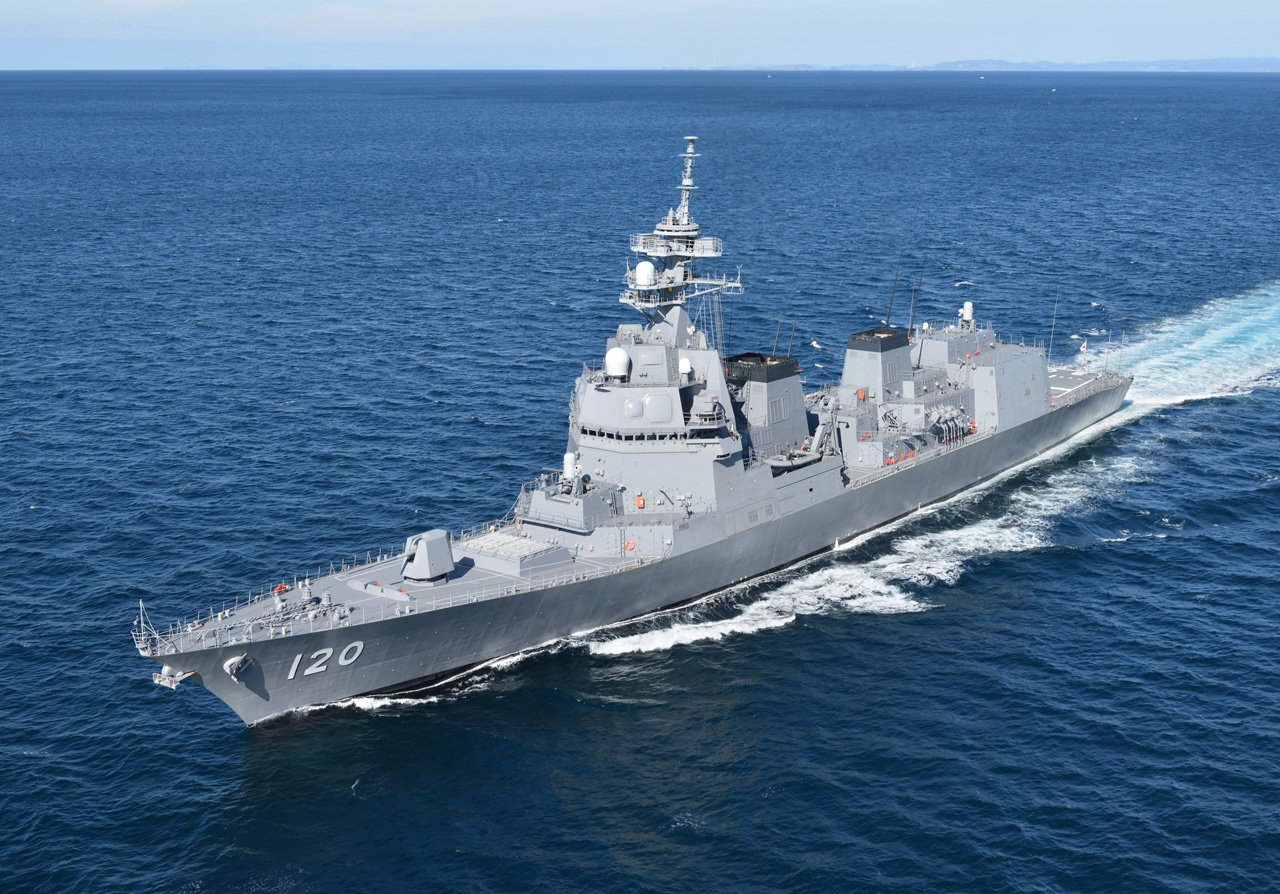
- JS Shiranui (DD-120)

Class overview
- Builders: Mitsubishi Heavy Industries; Nagasaki Shipyard
- Operators: Japan Maritime Self-Defense Force
- Preceded by: Akizuki class
- Cost: DD119: JPY72.3 billion; $893 million (constant 2009 USD)
- Built: 2015–2019
- In service: 2018-present
- In commission: 2018–present
- Completed: 2
- Active: 2

General characteristics
- Type: Destroyer
- Displacement: 5,100 t (5,000 long tons) standard; 6,800 t (6,700 long tons) full load
- Length: 151 m (495 ft 5 in)
- Beam: 18.3 m (60 ft 0 in)
- Draft: 5.4 m (17 ft 9 in)
- Depth: 10.9 m (35 ft 9 in)
- Propulsion: COGLAG, two shafts, two GE LM2500 turbines
- Speed: 30 knots (56 km/h; 35 mph)
- Complement: 230
- Sensors & processing systems: OYQ-13 ACDS; FCS-3A AAW system; OPY-1 AAW system; OQQ-24 ASW system; OQR-4 Towed sonar array system; NOLQ-3D-2 EW system; OPS-48 surface search radar
- Armament: 1 × Mk. 45 Mod 4 127 mm (5 in)/62 gun; 8 × Type 90 Anti-ship missile in quad canisters; 2 × 20 mm Phalanx Block1B CIWS; 2 × HOS-303 triple 324 mm (12.8 in) torpedo tubes; Anti-torpedo System; 32-cell Mk. 41 Vertical launching system; RIM-162 ESSM SAM; RUM-139 VL-ASROC; Type 07 VL-ASROC
- Aircraft carried: 1 × SH-60K helicopter

The Asahi class of destroyers is a class of warships of the Japan Maritime Self-Defense Force. The Asahi is largely based on the Akizuki-class destroyer; while the Akizuki-class specialized in anti-air warfare, the Asahi-class was designed to specialize in anti-submarine warfare. The design was initially designated "25DD", referring to a date on the Japanese calendar, specifically the 25th fiscal year of the Heisei period (2013), the year that procurement of the class began.

The lead ship, Asahi, is the third ship to hold the name after the Asahi-class destroyer escort lent from the United States Navy in 1955, and the Imperial Japanese battleship. The second ship of the class, Shiranui, is the third ship to hold its name after the Murakumo and Kagerō-class destroyers.

== Development ==
The procurement of the destroyer began in 2013 in response to the reduction in the number of destroyers (namely the Hatsuyuki class) within the JMSDF. The two major characteristics of this destroyer is its bigger emphasis on anti-submarine warfare and the adoption of a COGLAG (combined gas turbine electric and gas turbine: a modification of the combined gas and gas propulsion system employing electric propulsion system for low-speed cruising) propulsion system. A second destroyer was procured a year later.

== Design ==
The Asahi class is based on the existing Akizuki-class destroyer to reduce acquisition cost and allow future development and growth. Unlike the Akizuki class, which focuses on anti-aircraft warfare, the Asahi class focuses on anti-submarine warfare.

=== Features ===
The Asahi class is the first class of Japanese warships to be equipped with a COGLAG propulsion system, allowing the class to be more fuel efficient than previous warships. Another unique feature of this destroyer is the usage of a GaN-AESA (gallium nitride - active electronically scanned array) multifunction radar. The Asahi class is the second Japanese class of warship to be outfitted with this technology (the Akizuki class was the first). The destroyer's radar is based on the FCS-3A radar used for the Akizuki class and uses gallium nitride to improve performance. In radar technology, gallium nitride offers a number of advantages over the typically used gallium arsenide (GaA). These advantages include higher power density, efficiency, thermal spreading and frequency coverage. In turn, this allows the GaN chip to be smaller than their GaA counterpart, thus reducing cost and increasing overall cost effectiveness.

== Ships in the class ==
Building no.	Pennant no.	Name/Namesake	Laid down	Launched	Commissioned	Shipyard
1613	DD-119	Asahi (Morning Sun)	4 August 2015	19 October 2016	7 March 2018	MHI, Nagasaki
1614	DD-120	Shiranui (Phosphorescent Light)	20 May 2016	12 October 2017	27 February 2019	MHI, Nagasaki

== See also ==
- List of destroyer classes in service

Equivalent destroyers of the same era

- Type 052D
- Kolkata class
- Hobart class
