= SMART (missile) =

Long range anti submarine missile

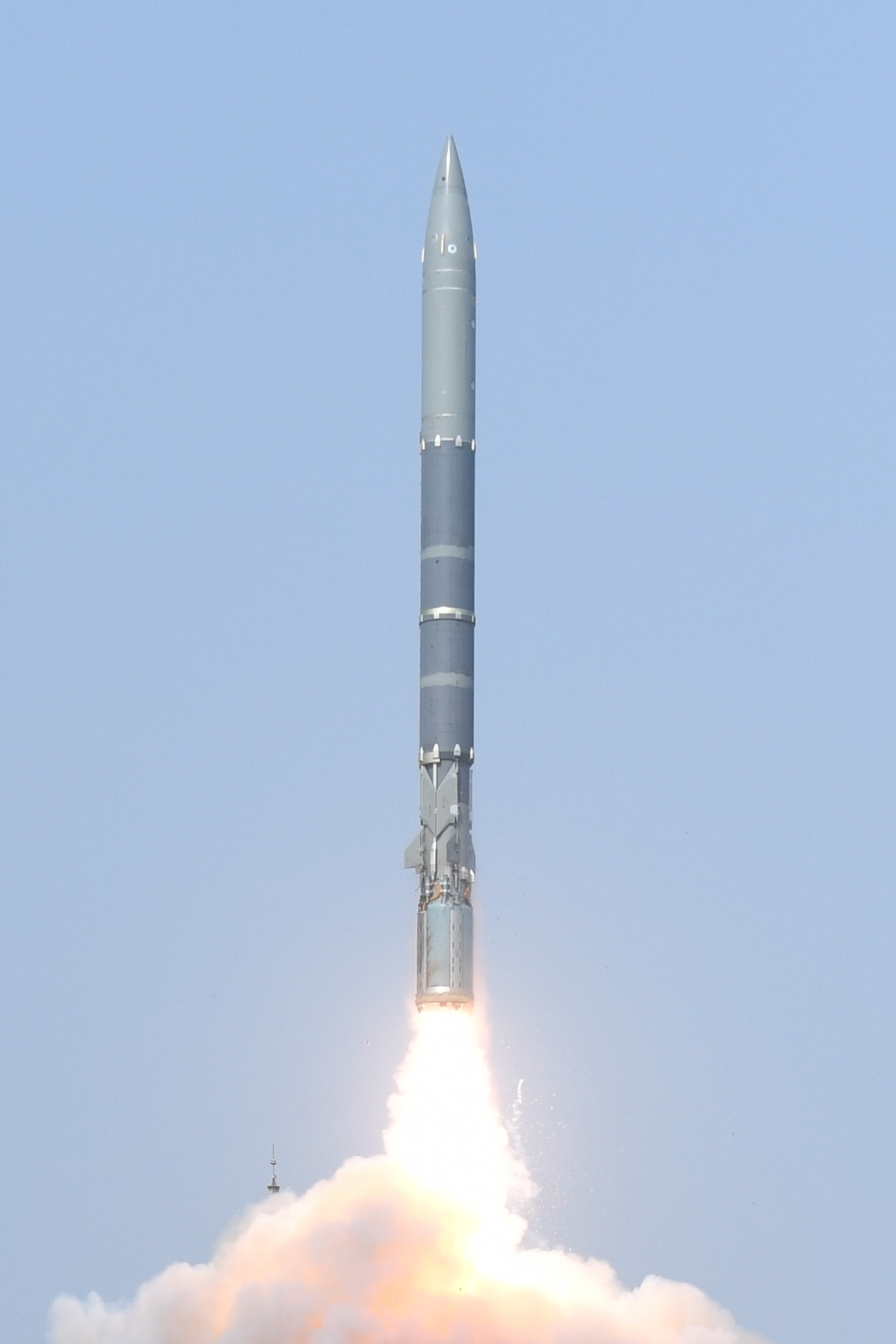
- SMART launched from Integrated Test Range
- Type: Anti-submarine missile
- Place of origin: India

Service history
- Used by: Indian Navy

Production history
- Designer: Defence Research and Development Organisation
- Designed: 2018–19

Specifications
- Warhead: Advanced Light-Weight Torpedo
- Engine: Two-stage solid rocket
- Operational range: 643 km (400 mi)
- Maximum speed: Mach 2.5
- Guidance system: INS + mid-course update via datalink
- Launch platform: 8 × 8 BEML-Tatra TEL; Surface ship

SMART (Supersonic Missile Assisted Release of Torpedo) is a canister-based, long-range supersonic anti-submarine missile developed by the Defence Research and Development Organisation (DRDO) for the Indian Navy.

== Description ==
SMART is a canisterised hybrid system, made up of a long-range missile carrier that can travel at supersonic speed and a lightweight torpedo as payload, for anti-submarine warfare (ASW) role. The objective behind the project was to develop a quick-reaction system that can launch torpedoes from standoff distance. The missile has a range of 643 km (400 mi) carrying a lightweight torpedo of range 20 km (12.5 mi) with 50 kg high explosive warhead. SMART uses two-way data link connected to airborne or ship based submarine detection and identification systems. SMART can be launched from a surface ship or a truck-based coastal battery.

The missile delivery system was developed jointly by Defence Research Development Laboratory (DRDL) and Research Centre Imarat (RCI). Naval Science and Technological Laboratory (NSTL) developed the autonomous lightweight torpedo and associated technologies such as detonation mechanism, underwater guidance and underwater thruster. Aerial Delivery Research and Development Establishment (ADRDE) developed the velocity reduction mechanism that act before releasing an autonomous lightweight torpedo towards the designated target. SMART is part of fusion project to combine technologies of institutions dealing with land and naval based armaments. High Energy Materials Research Laboratory (HEMRL) developed the insensitive explosive formulations for naval warhead.

The Ministry of Defence (MoD) in 2018–19 annual report mentioned that DRDO started the development and demonstration of missile-assisted release of lightweight torpedo for ASW role. The ejection trial was done using Torpedo Advanced Light Shyena.

The missile is powered by a dual-stage solid-propellant rocket and utilizes electro-mechanical actuators for course correction. For in-flight guidance, SMART uses a inertial navigation system (INS), and allows real-time course correction and target updating via datalink. The missile utilizes sea skimming in order to reduce detection range. SMART is similar in concept to the now cancelled UUM-125 Sea Lance from Boeing. The system is under-development due to increasing deployment of submarines by People's Liberation Army Navy Submarine Force (PLANSF) in the Indian Ocean Region (IOR), rapid modernization of naval assets by People's Liberation Army Navy (PLAN) and the building of Chinese overseas military bases in Africa.

== Trials ==
=== 2020 ===
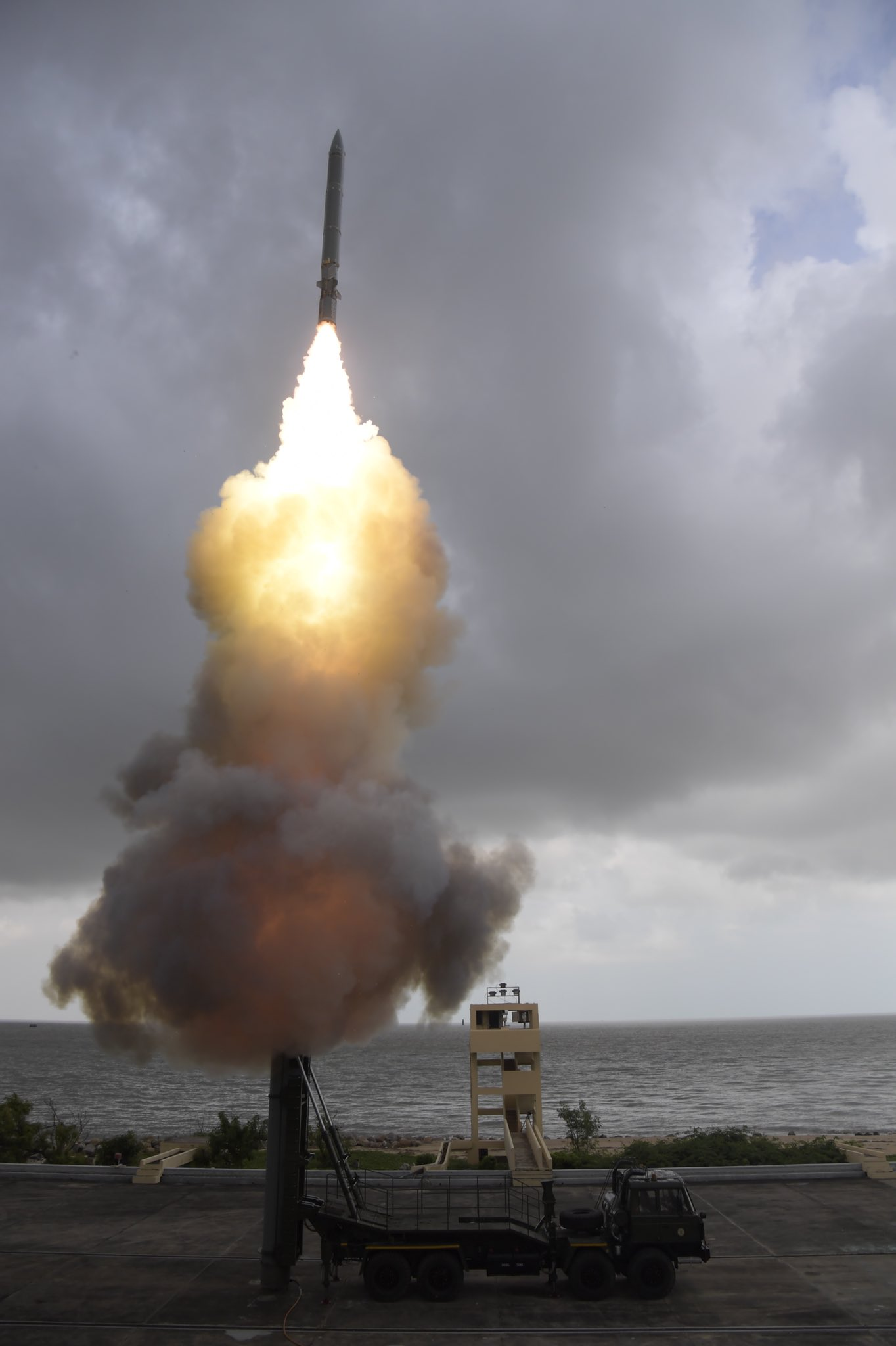
SMART missile launch from Integrated Test Range.

On 5 October 2020, the first successful test of SMART was done from Abdul Kalam Island. This was part of demonstration test to check missile flight for maximum range and altitude, separation of the nose cone, release of torpedo and deployment of velocity reduction mechanism.

=== 2021 ===
On 13 December 2021, the second test of SMART was conducted successfully from Integrated Test Range (ITR), Odisha. The entire trajectory was monitored by the electro-optic telemetry system, various range radars including the downrange instrumentation and downrange ships. The missile carried a torpedo, parachute delivery system and release mechanisms.

=== 2023 ===
Two field tests were conducted in 2023, and certain parameters—such as parachute deployment, torpedo ejection, and missile nose opening—were successfully achieved.

=== 2024 ===
SMART launch video

On 1 May 2024, DRDO successfully conducted the fifth SMART missile trial from Integrated Test Range, Balasore, Odisha. The entire range capability was demonstrated during the test, which was carried out using a ground-based canister launcher system. The test confirmed velocity control, ejection, and symmetric separation. Precision inertial navigation, an electromechanical actuator system, and a two-stage solid propulsion system were all part of the missile architecture. The system's payload consisted of a sophisticated lightweight torpedo and a parachute-based release mechanism.

== Operator ==
India

- Indian Navy

== See also ==
- K745A1 Red Shark – (South Korea)
- RUM-139 VL-ASROC – (United States)
- Type 07 vertical-launch anti-submarine rocket – (Japan)
- RPK-6 Vodopad/RPK-7 Veter – (Soviet Union)
- RPK-2 Vyuga – (Soviet Union)
- UUM-125 Sea Lance – (United States)
