= FCS-3 =

Naval weapons system developed by the Japanese Defense Ministry

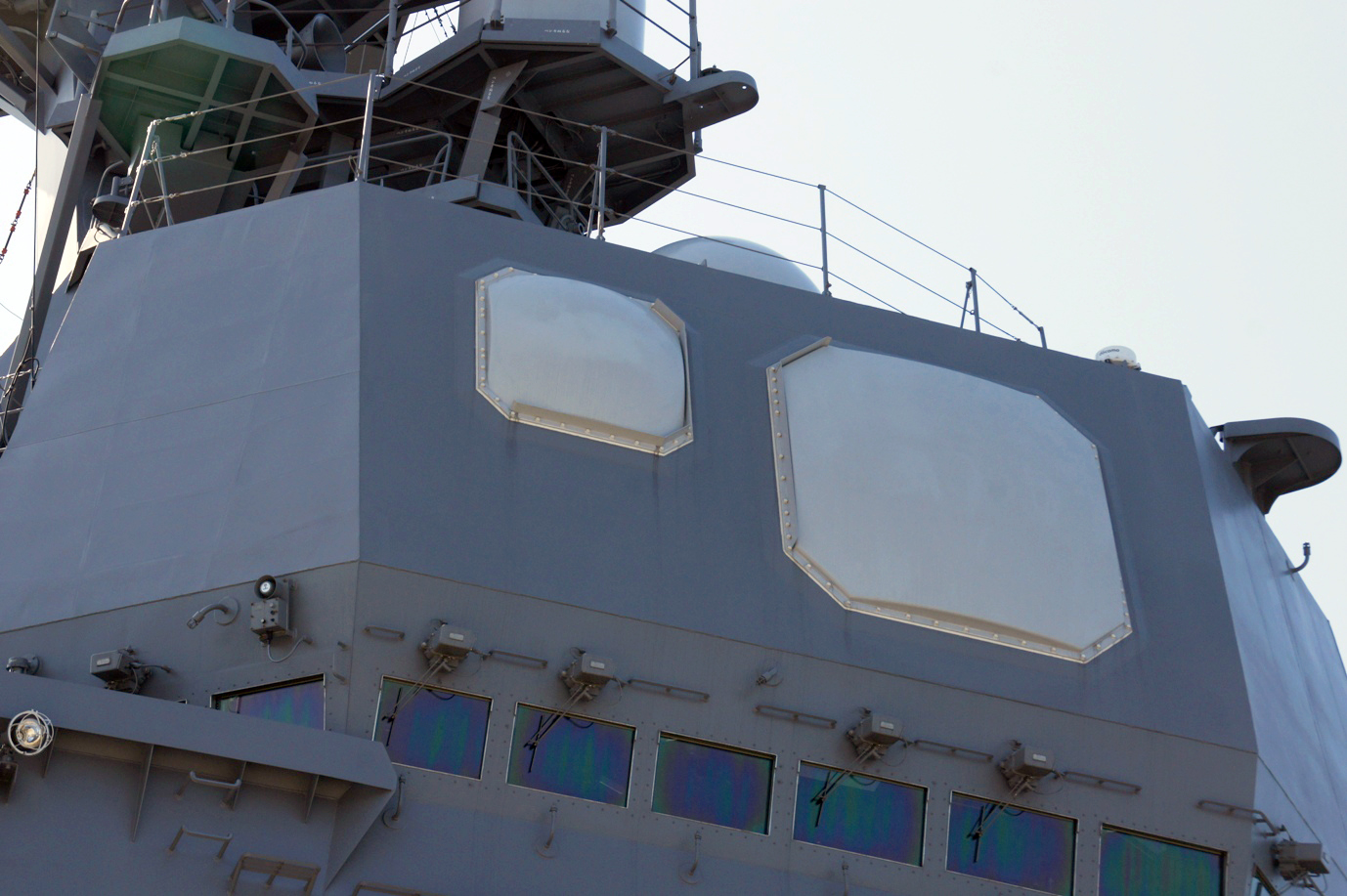
FCS-3A on board JS Akizuki

FCS-3 is an integrated naval weapons system developed by the Japanese Defense Ministry for the Japan Maritime Self-Defense Force.

This system is composed of weapon-direction and fire-control subsystem and a multi-function radar subsystem. The multi-function radar subsystem adopted active electronically scanned array (AESA) technology, and there are two sets of antennas: the larger one is a C-band radar for surveillance and tracking, the smaller one is an X-band radar as a fire-control radar.

After a prolonged sea trial on board JS Asuka, this system was introduced in 2007 on the JS Hyūga (DDH-181). The enhanced version, FCS-3A, was employed on the Akizuki-class destroyers., and limited-function version, OPS-50, was also delivered for the Izumo-class helicopter destroyers. The fire-control function are omitted in the OPS-50 system, so they have only one set of antennas operating C-band.

The Asahi-class destroyer features an FCS-3A radar that uses Gallium nitride technology to improve its performance.
