= Type 07 vertical-launch anti-submarine rocket =

Type 07 VL-ASROC
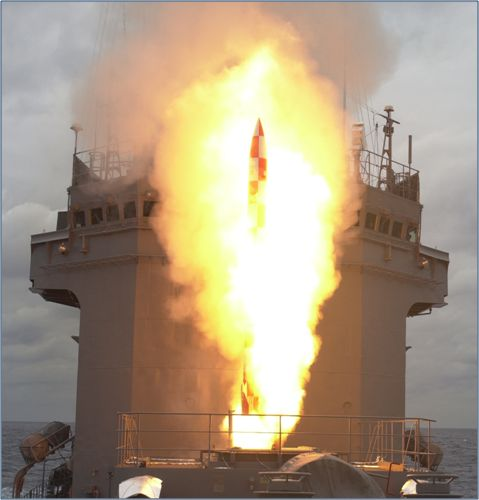
- Type: Anti-submarine missile
- Place of origin: Japan

Service history
- In service: 2007 - present
- Used by: Japan Maritime Self-Defense Force

Specifications
- Mass: 1,284 kg
- Length: 6.535 m
- Diameter: 450 mm
- Warhead: Type 97 or 12 torpedo
- Engine: Two-stage solid-fuel rocket
- Operational range: over 30 kilometers (33,000 yd)
- Guidance system: Inertial guidance
- Launch platform: Surface ship

The Type 07 vertical-launch anti-submarine rocket (07式垂直発射魚雷投射ロケット, 07-shiki suichoku hassha gyorai tōsha roketto) is a Japanese ship-launched anti-submarine missile.

== Description ==
The missile is fired from Mark 41 vertical launching systems and is capable of reaching transonic speeds. It is controlled by an inertial guidance system and uses thrust vectoring. Its maximum range is said to be over 30 kilometres (19 miles).

== Operators ==
Japan Maritime Self-Defense Force
- Akizuki-class destroyer
- Asahi-class destroyer
- Maya-class destroyer

== See also ==
- List of missiles by country#Japan
- K745A1 Red Shark
- RUM-139 VL-ASROC
- SMART
