= RUM-139 VL-ASROC =

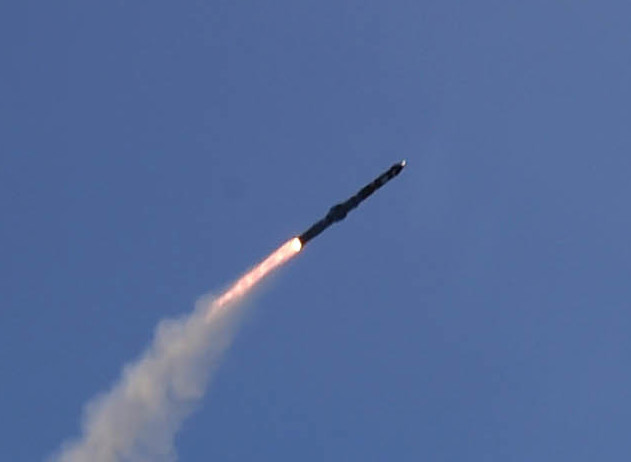
- RUM-139 midflight
- Type: Anti-submarine missile
- Place of origin: United States

Service history
- In service: 1993 – present
- Used by: United States Navy, Japan Maritime Self-Defense Force and others

Production history
- Designer: Goodyear Aerospace
- Designed: 1983 – 1993
- Manufacturer: Lockheed Martin
- Produced: 1993 – present

Specifications
- Mass: 1,409 lb (639 kg)
- Length: 16 ft 1 in (4.89 m)
- Diameter: 1 ft 2 in (358 mm)
- Wingspan: 2 ft 3.4 in (696 mm)
- Warhead: RUM-139A: Mark 46 Mod 5 torpedo RUM-139B: Mark 46 Mod 5A(SW) torpedo RUM-139C: Mark 54 torpedo
- Engine: Two-stage solid-fuel rocket
- Operational range: 12 nmi (22 km)
- Maximum speed: Mach 1 (309 m/s; 1013 ft/s)
- Guidance system: Inertial guidance and Mk 210 Mod 0 Digital Autopilot Control subsystem
- Launch platform: Mk 41 VLS
- References: Janes

The RUM-139 Vertical-Launch Anti-Submarine Rocket (VL-ASROC or VLA) is an anti-submarine missile in the ASROC family, currently built by Lockheed Martin for the U.S. Navy.

== History ==
Design and development of the missile began in 1983 when Goodyear Aerospace was contracted by the U.S. Navy to develop a ship-launched anti-submarine missile compatible with the new Mark 41 vertical launching system (VLS). The development of the VLS ASROC underwent many delays, and it was not deployed on any ships until 1993. During this development, Goodyear Aerospace was bought by Loral Corporation in 1986, and this defense division was in turn purchased by Lockheed Martin in 1995.

The first VLS ASROC missile was a RUR-5 ASROC with an upgraded solid-fuel booster section and a digital guidance system. It carries a lightweight Mark 46 homing torpedo that is dropped from the rocket at a precalculated point on its trajectory, and then parachuted into the sea.

The vertical launch missile first became operational in 1993, with more than 450 having been produced by 2007. It is 4.5 meters (15 ft) in length, with a firing range of about 11.8 nm or 22 kilometers (24,000 yd).

Beginning in 1996, the missile was replaced by the newer RUM-139A and subsequently the RUM-139B. The torpedo remained the Mark 46, though at one time an improved variant using the Mark 50 was proposed and then canceled.

In October 2004, the RUM-139C began production with the Mark 54 torpedo. The Mk 54 Mod 0 torpedo achieved Initial Operating Capability in 2010, and the U.S. Navy is transitioning its VL-ASROCs to use the Mk 54.

== See also ==
- K745A1 Red Shark – (South Korea)
- Type 07 vertical-launch anti-submarine rocket – (Japan)
- RPK-6 Vodopad/RPK-7 Veter – (Soviet Union)
- SMART – (India)
