= Japanese ship Myōkō =

At least two warships of Japan have borne the name Myōkō:

- Japanese cruiser Myōkō, was a Myōkō-class cruiser launched in 1927 and scuttled in 1946
- JS Myōkō, is a Kongō-class destroyer launched in 1994
