= JS Kongō =

Kongō-class guided missile destroyer

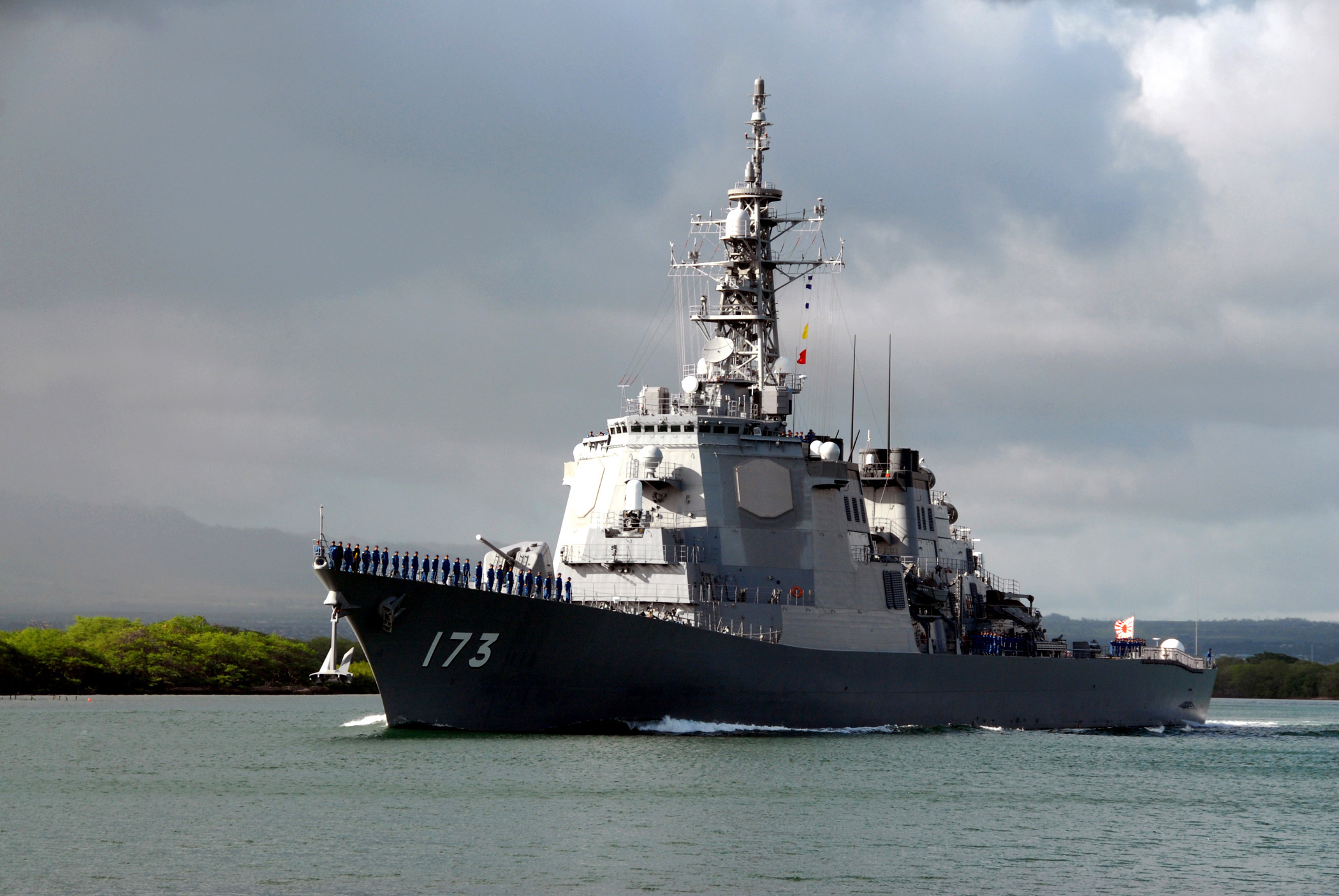
- JS Kongō transiting Pearl Harbor on 14 December 2007

History

Japan
- Name: Kongō; (こんごう)
- Namesake: Mount Kongō
- Ordered: 1988
- Builder: Mitsubishi Heavy Industries
- Laid down: 8 May 1990
- Launched: 26 September 1991
- Commissioned: 25 March 1993
- Home port: Sasebo
- Identification: MMSI number: 431999504; Pennant number: DDG-173
- Status: Active

General characteristics
- Class & type: Kongō-class destroyer
- Displacement: 7500 tons standard; 9500 tons full load
- Length: 528.2 ft (161.0 m)
- Beam: 68.9 ft (21.0 m)
- Draft: 20.3 ft (6.2 m)
- Propulsion: 4 Ishikawajima Harima/General Electric LM2500-30 gas turbines; two shafts, 100,000 shp (75,000 kW)
- Speed: 30 knots (56 km/h; 35 mph)
- Range: 4,500 nautical miles (8,300 km; 5,200 mi) at 20 knots (37 km/h; 23 mph)
- Complement: 300
- Sensors & processing systems: AN/SPY-1D; OPS-28 surface search radar; OQS-102 bow mounted sonar
- Electronic warfare & decoys: NOLQ-2 intercept / jammer
- Armament: 1 × 127 mm (5 in)/54 Caliber Oto Melara Compact Gun; 8 × RGM-84 Harpoon Anti-ship Missile in quad canisters; 2 × 20 mm Phalanx CIWS; 2 × HOS-302 triple torpedo tubes: Mark 46 torpedo; Type 73 torpedoes; 90-cell Mk. 41 Vertical Launching System: SM-2MR Surface-to-air missile; SM-3 Anti-ballistic missile; RUM-139 Anti-Submarine Rocket; RIM-162 Surface-to-air missile
- Aviation facilities: 1 × SH-60K helicopter

JS Kongō (DDG-173) is a Kongō-class guided missile destroyer in the Japan Maritime Self-Defense Force (JMSDF). Kongō is the third Japanese naval vessel named after Mount Kongō. She was laid down by Mitsubishi Heavy Industries in Nagasaki, Nagasaki on 8 May 1990. The launching ceremony took place on 26 September 1991 and she was commissioned on 25 March 1993. She was the first ship outside of the United States to feature the Aegis combat system and its ballistic missile defense capability.

== Operational history ==
Kongō was laid down on 8 May 1990 at Mitsubishi Heavy Industries Nagasaki Shipyard's Yaijima Plant as a 7200-ton destroyer planned in 1988 based on the medium-term defense improvement plan. She was launched on 26 September 1991 and commissioned on 25 March 1993. Overall, The construction cost was 122.3 billion yen. As the lead ship, she was the only one in her class not to have the ORQ-1 helicopter data link installed at the time of commissioning, which was installed later along with the antenna of Link 16.

From 26 November 1993 to 21 February 1994 she was dispatched to Hawaii for the Aegis System Equipment Qualification Test (SQT). Later that year, she participated in RIMPAC between 23 June and 6 July, also around Hawaii. She also participated in RIMPAC 2000, accompanied by a large JMSDF fleet consisting of the destroyers Kurama, Shimakaze, Murasame, Harusame, Yūdachi, Kirisame, Asagiri, as well as the supply ship Hamana and submarine Natusushio. During the exercise Kongō successfully intercepted 3 simulated missiles and an F-16 with her SM-2 Surface-to-air missiles.

She was deployed to the Indian Ocean between 17 May and 19 September 2004 in response to the passing of the "Act on Special Measures Against Terrorism", alongside the Ariake and Hamana.

In November 2006 she was dry-docked at Mitsubishi Heavy Industries Nagasaki Shipyard for inspection and modified to carry the SM-3 block IA, which was completed by March 2007 and inspections finished by August. On 15 October of the same year, she was stationed near Hawaii for the purpose of MD system testing, and succeeded in tracking two targets during an interception test with the US Navy Ticonderoga-class cruiser USS Lake Erie on 6 November. On 15 November, she succeeded in tracking a separated target during ballistic missile target tracking training. In December 2007, Japan conducted a successful test of the SM-3 block IA against a ballistic missile aboard Kongō. This was the first time a Japanese ship was selected to launch the interceptor missile during a test of the Aegis Ballistic Missile Defense System. In previous tests they provided tracking and communications.

In 2012, Kongō, Chōkai and Myōkō were deployed in cooperation with the US Navy in preparation for the Democratic Republic of Korea to test the Kwangmyŏngsŏng-3 Unit 2. However, the ships were withdrawn after the satellite did not violate Japanese airspace.

In April 2013 she was again sortied in response to a North Korean missile launch, returning to Sasebo on 30 June.

As of April 2020, Kongō is based in Sasebo, Nagasaki.

== In popular culture ==
- Kongō is featured in the opening sequence of the 12th episode of the 2010 anime series Highschool of the Dead participating in ballistic missile defense with JS Kirishima, USS Shiloh, and USS Curtis Wilbur.

== Gallery ==
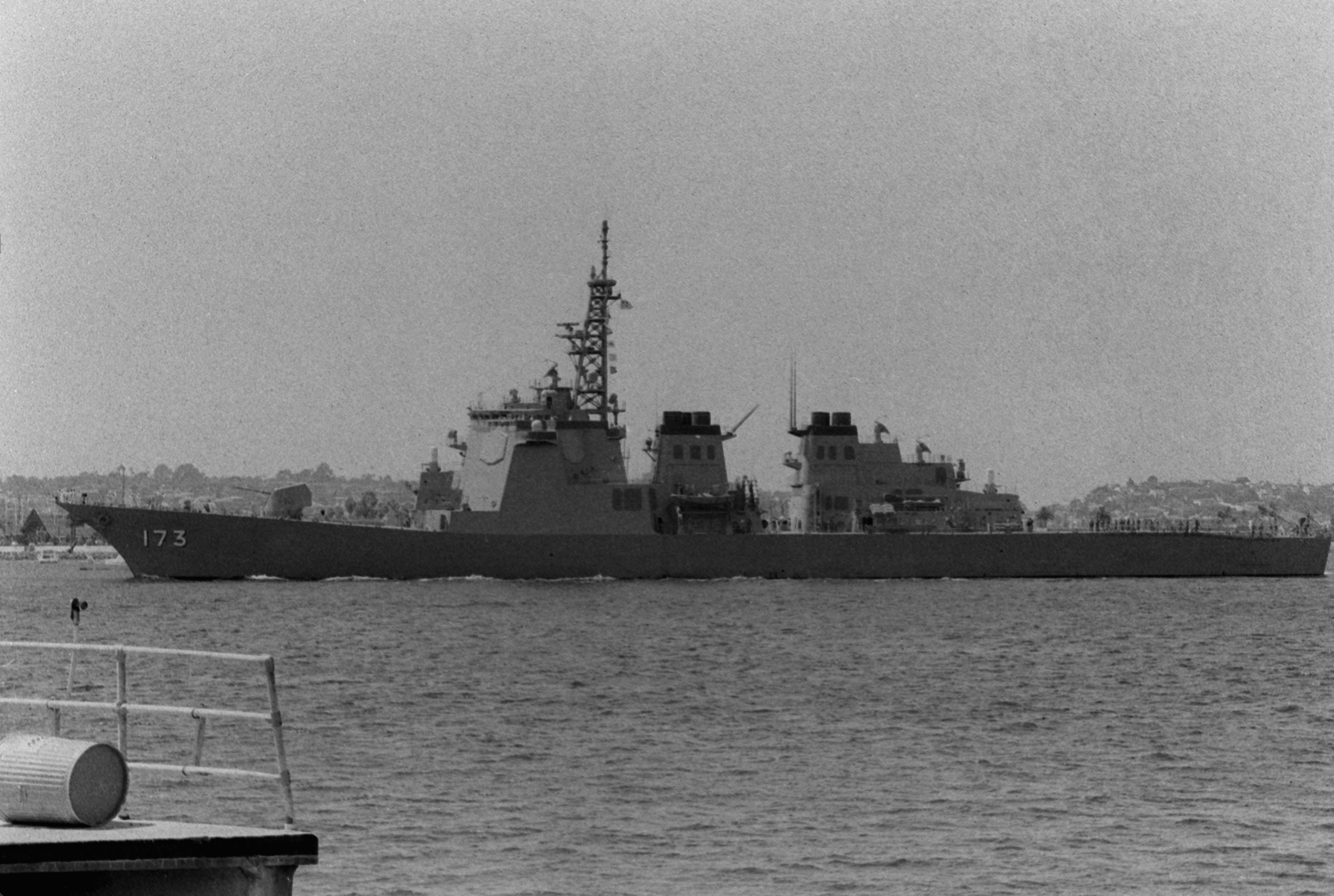
JS Kongō in San Diego on 1 July 1994

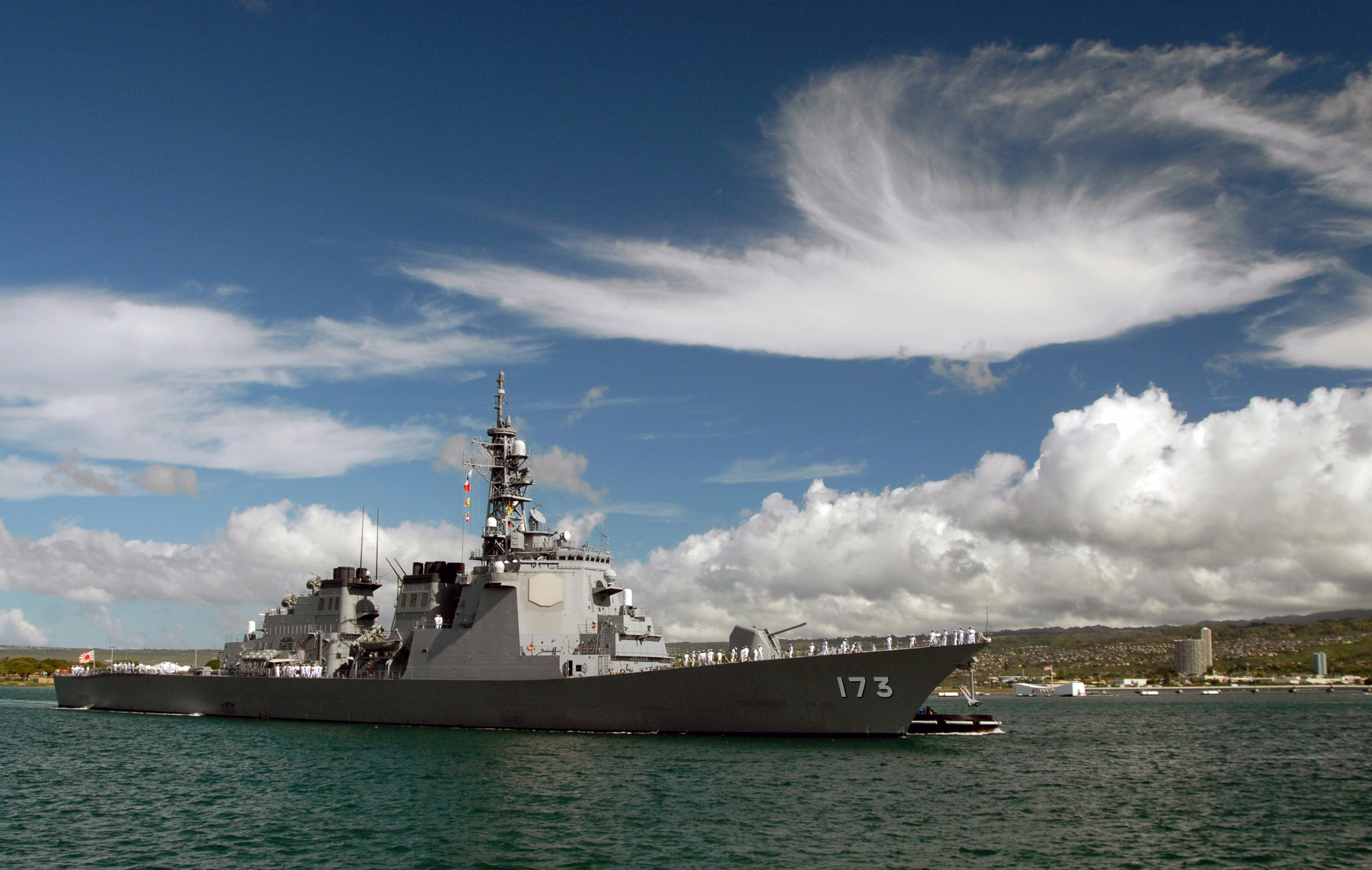
JS Kongō at Pearl Harbor on 15 October 2007

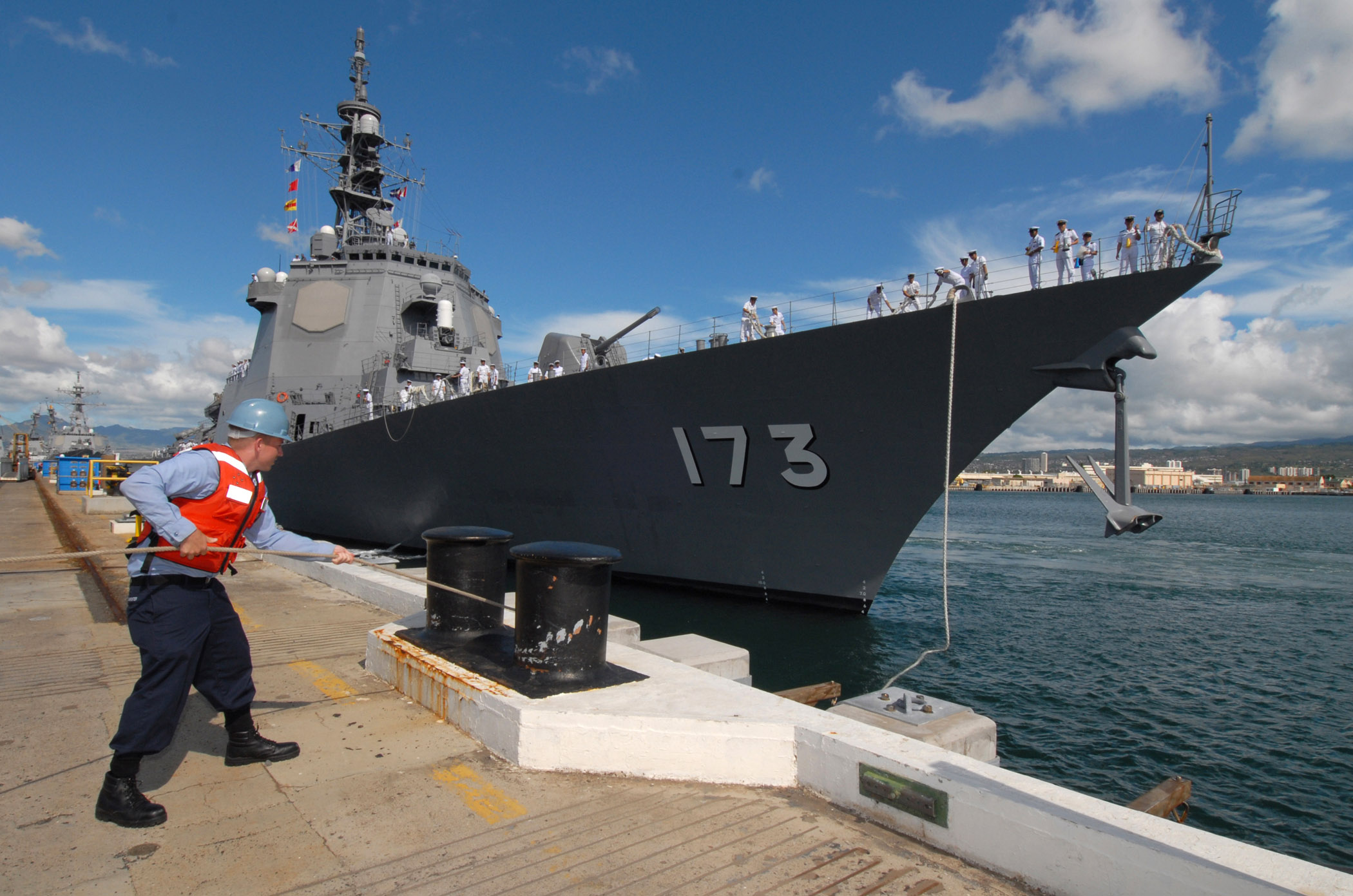

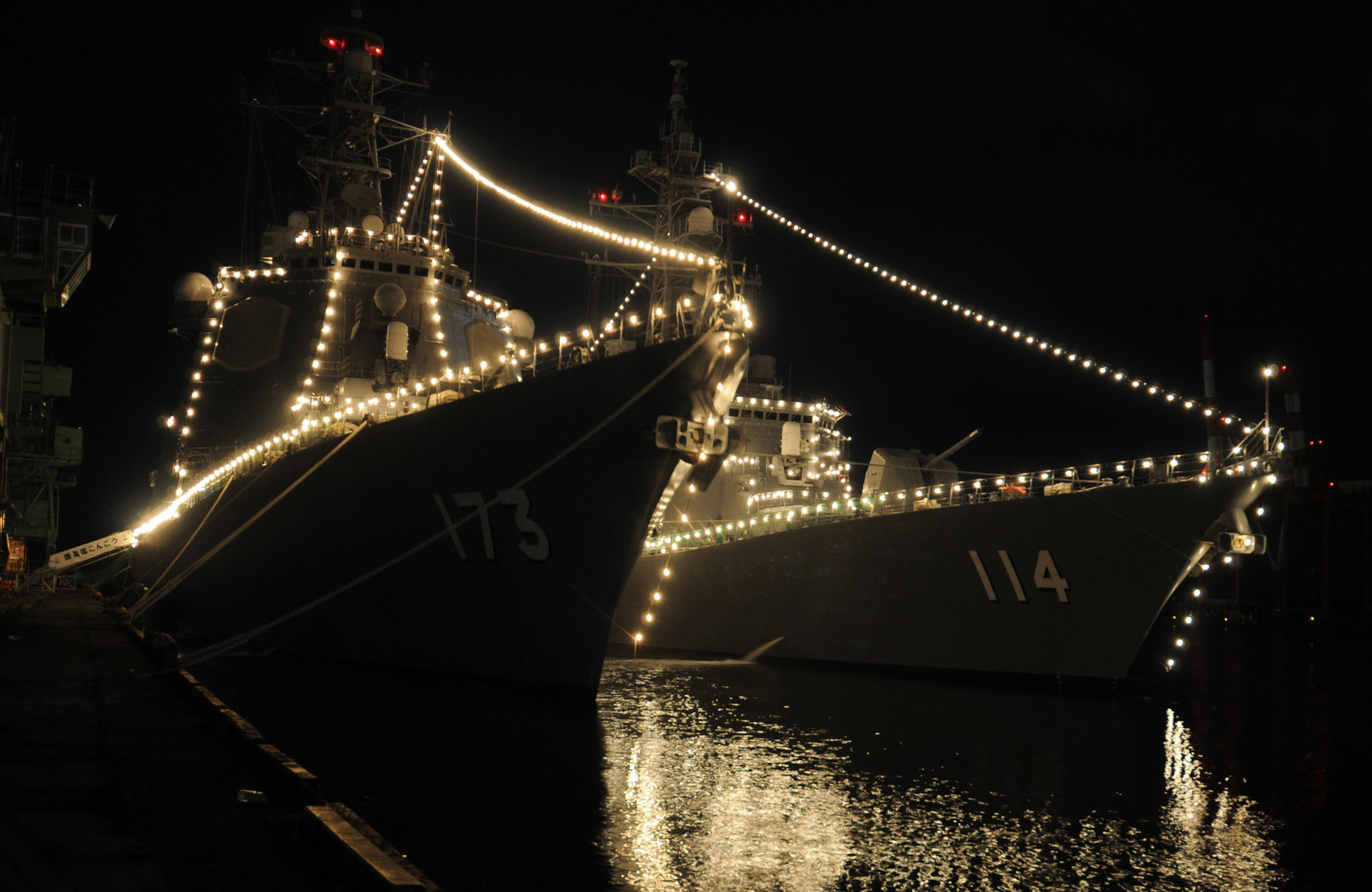
JS Kongō and JS Suzunami at Sendai on 23 July 2010

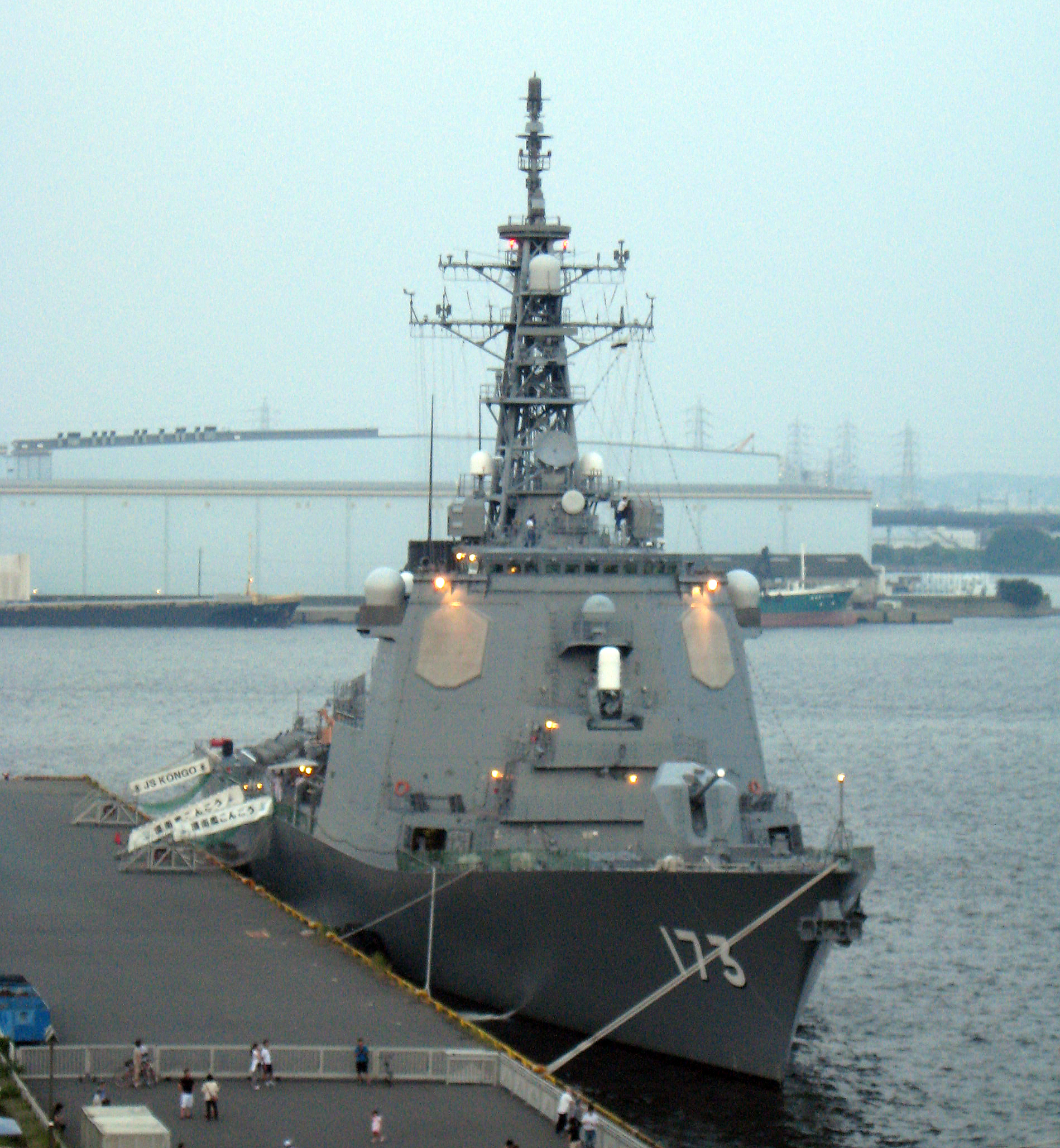
JS Kongō at Nagoya on 22 August 2010
