= Japanese ship Kirishima =

At least two warships of Japan have borne the name Kirishima:

- Japanese battleship Kirishima, a battleship of the Imperial Japanese Navy, commissioned in 1915 and named after the volcano
- JS Kirishima, a destroyer of the Japan Maritime Self-Defense Force commissioned in 1995
