= USS Shiloh (CG-67) =

US Navy guided missile cruiser

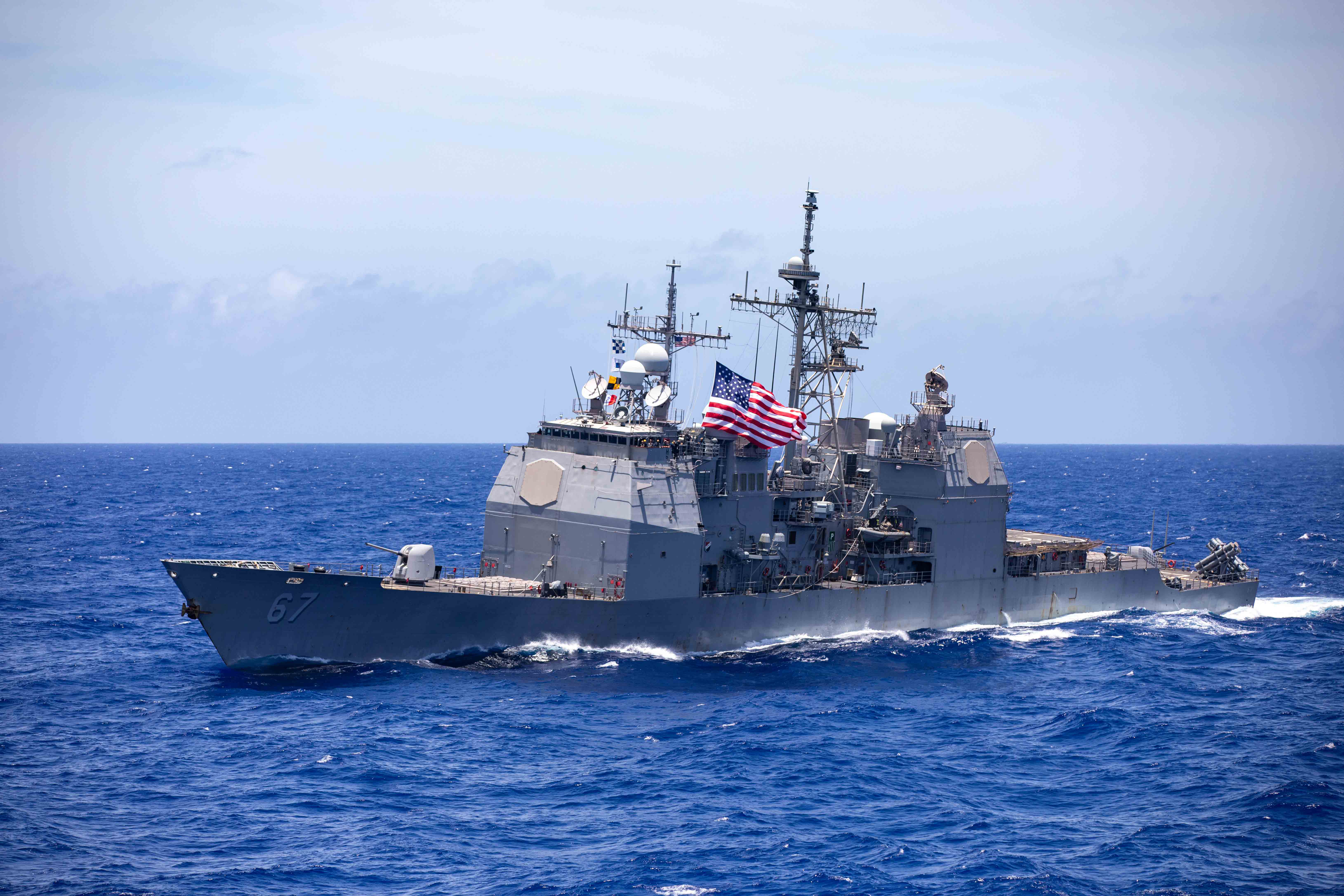
- USS Shiloh (CG-67)

History

United States
- Name: Shiloh
- Namesake: Battle of Shiloh
- Ordered: 16 April 1987
- Builder: Bath Iron Works
- Laid down: 1 August 1989
- Launched: 8 September 1990
- Acquired: 24 April 1992
- Commissioned: 18 July 1992
- Decommissioned: 30 September 2026
- Home port: Joint Base Pearl Harbor–Hickam
- Identification: MMSI number: 338912000; Call sign: NSLH; Hull number: CG-67
- Motto: Making Excellence a Tradition
- Status: Decommissioned September 2026
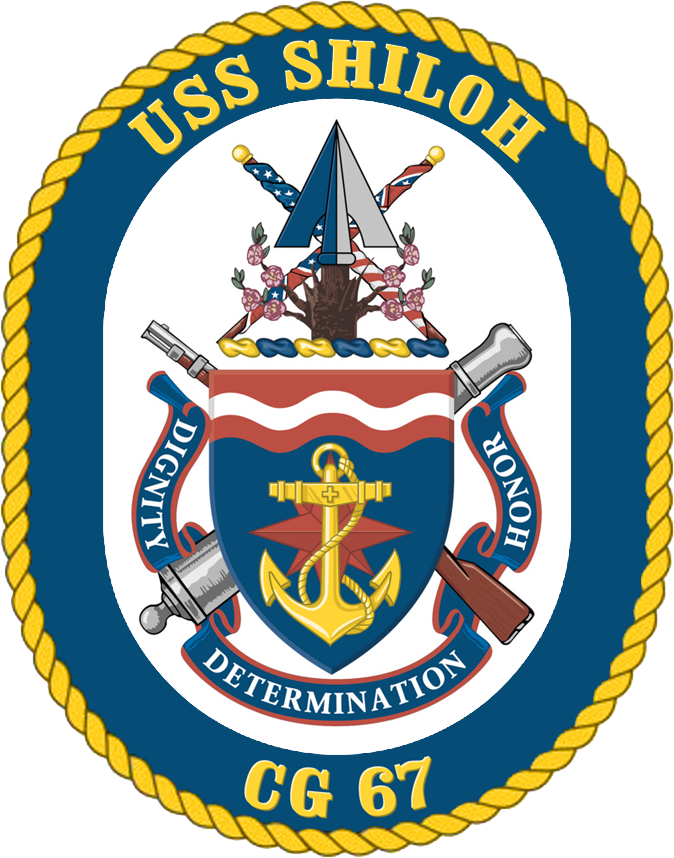
- Badge

General characteristics
- Class & type: Ticonderoga-class cruiser
- Displacement: Approx. 9,600 long tons (9,800 t) full load
- Length: 567 feet (173 m)
- Beam: 55 feet (16.8 meters)
- Draft: 34 feet (10.2 meters)
- Propulsion: 4 × General Electric LM2500 gas turbine engines; 2 × controllable-reversible pitch propellers; 2 × rudders
- Speed: 32.5 knots (60 km/h; 37.4 mph)
- Complement: 30 officers and 300 enlisted
- Sensors & processing systems: AN/SPY-1A/B multi-function radar; AN/SPS-49 air search radar (Removed on some ships); AN/SPG-62 fire control radar; AN/SPS-73 surface search radar; AN/SPQ-9 gun fire control radar; AN/SQQ-89(V)1/3 - A(V)15 Sonar suite, consisting of: AN/SQS-53B/C/D active sonar; AN/SQR-19 TACTAS, AN/SQR-19B ITASS, & MFTA passive sonar; AN/SQQ-28 light airborne multi-purpose system
- Armament: 2 × 61 cell Mk 41 vertical launch systems containing; 122 × mix of: RIM-66M-5 Standard SM-2MR Block IIIB; RIM-156A SM-2ER Block IV; RIM-161 SM-3; RIM-162A ESSM; RIM-174A Standard ERAM; BGM-109 Tomahawk; RUM-139A VL-ASROC; 8 × RGM-84 Harpoon missiles; 2 × 5 in (127 mm)/62 caliber Mark 45 Mod 4 lightweight gun; 2 × Mk 38 25 mm Machine Gun Systems; 2–4 × .50 in (12.7 mm) cal. machine gun; 2 × Phalanx CIWS Block 1B; 2 × Mk 32 12.75 in (324 mm) triple torpedo tubes
- Aircraft carried: 2 × MH-60R Seahawk LAMPS Mk III helicopters.

USS Shiloh (CG-67) was a Ticonderoga-class guided missile cruiser of the United States Navy, named in remembrance of the Battle of Shiloh during the American Civil War. She was built at the Bath Iron Works in Bath, Maine.

With her guided missiles and guns, she was capable of facing and defeating threats in the air, on or under the sea, and ashore. She also carried two Seahawk LAMPS multi-purpose helicopters, mainly for anti-submarine warfare (ASW).

== History ==
=== 1990s ===
On 3 September 1996, while in the Carl Vinson carrier battle group, Shiloh launched six Tomahawk cruise missiles in Operation Desert Strike against Iraq.

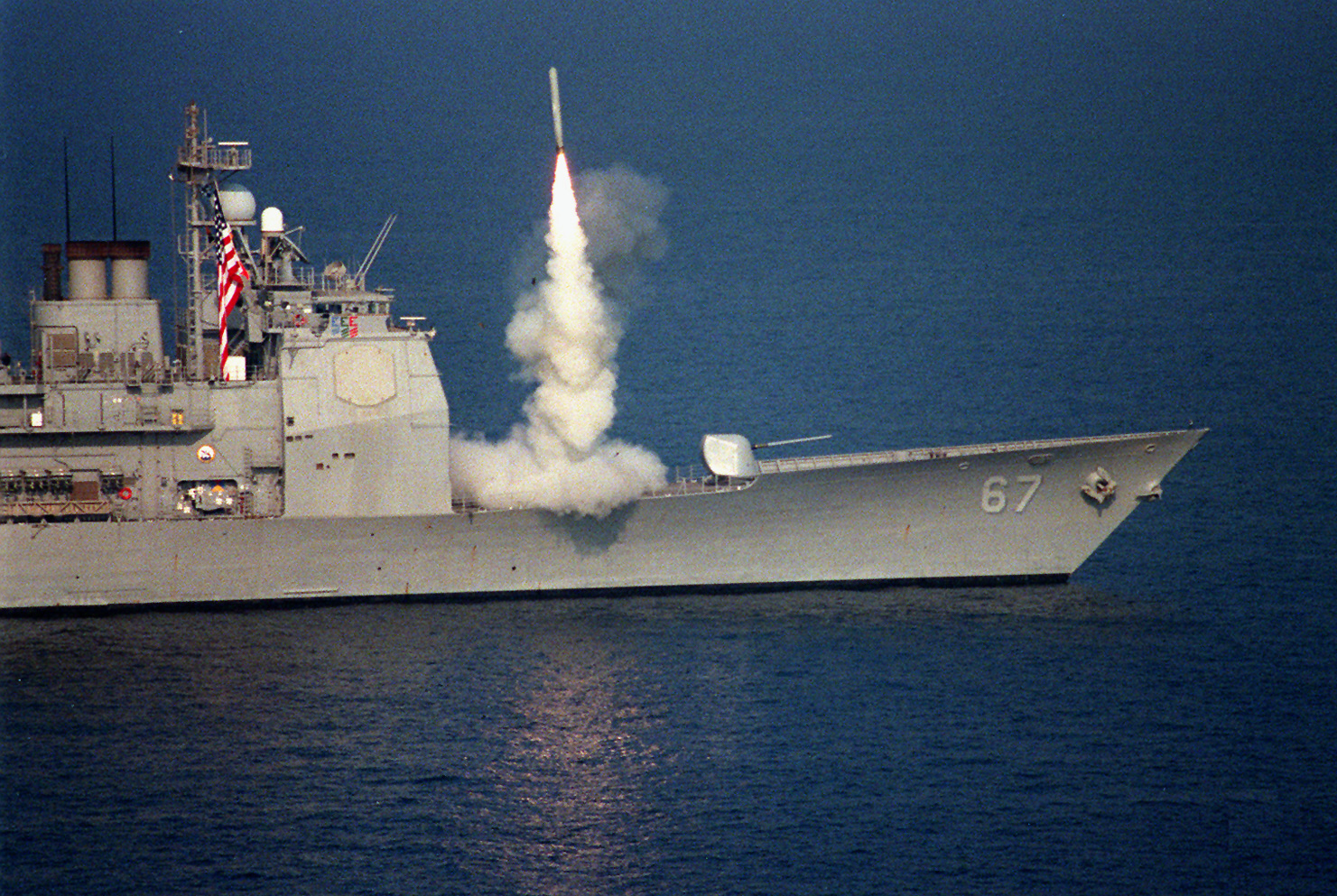
USS Shiloh launching a cruise missile in the Persian Gulf, 3 September 1996.

=== 2000s ===
She deployed with the Battle Group again in July 2002, and was among the first cruisers to launch missiles in Operation Iraqi Freedom. In March 2003 Shiloh was assigned to Cruiser-Destroyer Group Three. The Shiloh returned to her homeport San Diego, California on 25 April 2003, ending an unusually long nine-month deployment.

In January 2005, she participated in Operation Unified Assistance, rendering aid to those who suffered from the 26 December 2004 tsunami off the coast of Aceh, Indonesia. Shiloh was one of the first American ships to arrive on scene.

On 22 June 2006, a Standard Missile Three (or SM-3) launched from Shiloh intercepted a multi-stage ballistic missile launched from the Pacific Missile Range Facility at Barking Sands, Hawaii.

In August 2006, she arrived on station at Yokosuka Naval Base in Yokosuka, Japan, replacing USS Chancellorsville, as part of a joint U.S.-Japanese ballistic missile defense program.

On 8 July 2009, Petty Officer 1st Class Christopher Geathers fell from the ship's fantail into Tokyo Bay while rigging shore power cables. A two-and-a-half-day search failed to locate Geathers and he was declared missing and later was declared dead. A Navy investigation, led by Rear Admiral Kevin Donegan, commander of Task Force 70, found that the accident was preventable, in part because Shiloh personnel had observed Geathers working without proper safety equipment, but had failed to intervene. Nevertheless, the report did not recommend disciplinary action against any of the ship's crewmembers.

=== 2010s ===
In June 2017, a gas turbine systems technician named Peter Mims thought to have been lost at sea was found after seven days hiding in the engine room. Following the Mims incident, several sailors contacted the Navy Times about severe morale problems on the ship to which they attributed the Mims incident. The Navy Times requested "command climate surveys" through a Freedom of Information Act request.

These surveys, completed voluntarily by sailors on the ship, reported extensive morale problems universally blamed on the CO, Captain Adam M. Aycock. Among the complaints were widespread depression and suicidal tendencies, a dysfunctional ship that sailors felt was ill-prepared for combat, an overworked and deeply stressed crew, and a constant worry of extreme punishment for minor infractions. Sailors were dismayed that despite a significant number of the ship's crew filing severely critical complaints of Aycock's leadership in the command climate surveys, the only action taken by the Navy was to counsel him. Capt. Aycock was relieved of command after completing his full 26-month tour.

=== 2020s ===
In 2020, a US Navy budget plan proposed putting Shiloh, as well as her sister ships USS Monterey, USS Port Royal, and USS Vella Gulf, on a path to early decommissioning, as they had not been modernized.

In December 2020 the U.S. Navy's Report to Congress on the Annual Long-Range Plan for Construction of Naval Vessels stated that the ship was planned to be placed Out of Commission in Reserve in 2024.

In the US Navy's 2024 proposed budget, presented in 2023, Shiloh was proposed for retirement. Navy Undersecretary Erik Raven stated that this was due to the ship's "material condition, life remaining, cost, ... time to upgrade ... and the warfighting value."

In September 2023, USS Shiloh departs Yokosuka, Japan after 17 years of forward-deployed service. She will be homeported in Pearl Harbor, Hawaii. Shiloh is projected to be inactivated 30 September 2026.

On September 30th, 2026 after 34 years of service to the United States Navy, USS Shiloh is decommissioned at Joint Base Pearl Harbor-Hickam in Hawaii.

== Awards ==
Shiloh has earned the following awards during her service life:

- Captain Edward F. Ney Memorial Award winner for food service excellence US Navy for 1997.
- Battle Efficiency E Awards for: 2013 & 2021

== In popular culture ==
- The ship is featured prominently in the 2012 naval thriller, Fire of the Raging Dragon, by Don Brown.
- Shiloh makes an appearance in the 12th episode of the 2010 anime series Highschool of the Dead, assisting JS Kongō during a ballistic missile defense.
