= AN/SPG-62 =

Naval continuous wave fire-control radar

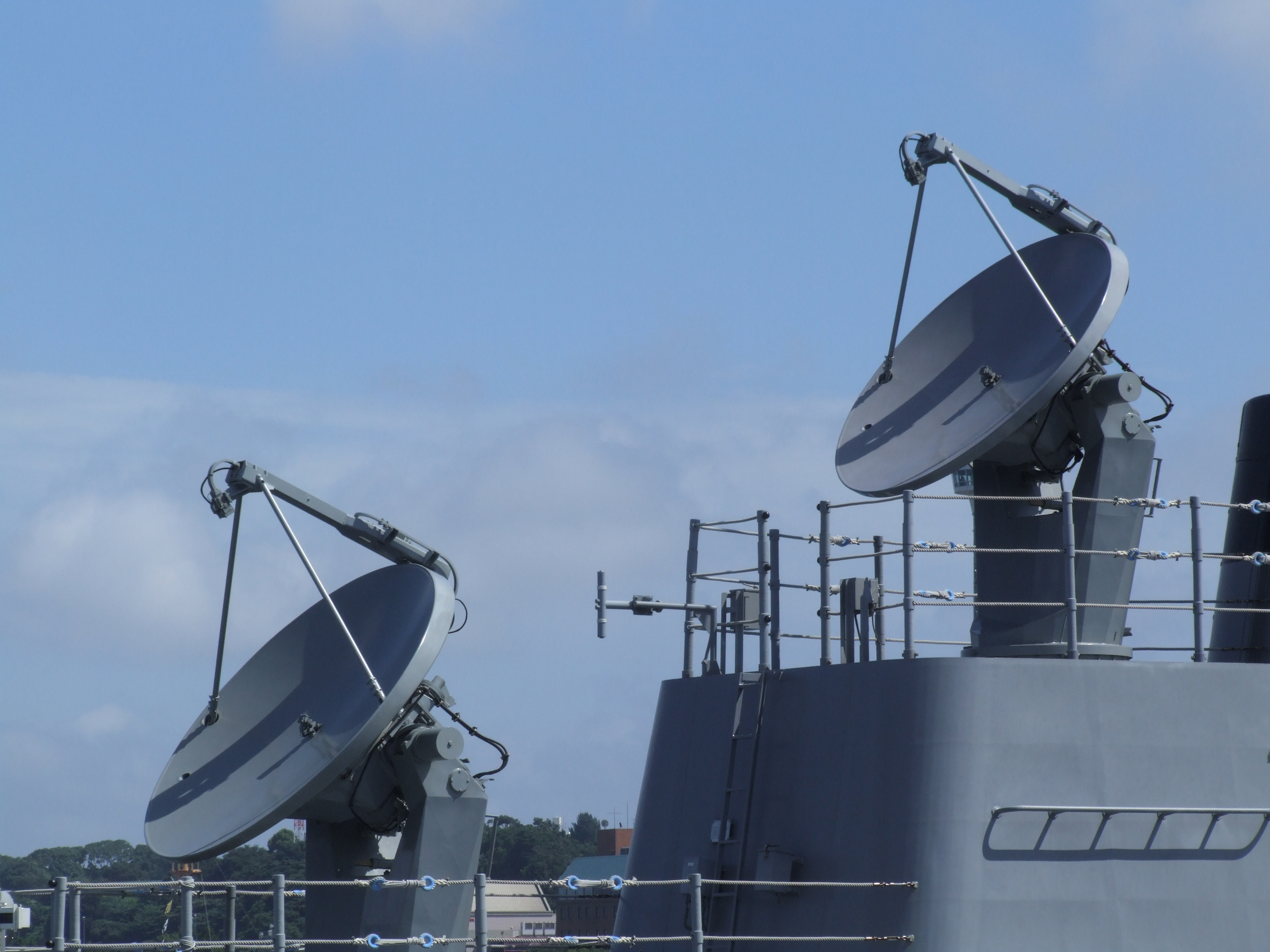
- The two rearward AN/SPG-62 fire-control radars aboard JS Kirishima (DDG-174)
- Country of origin: United States
- Designer: Raytheon
- Type: Missile fire-control
- Frequency: 8–12 GHz (X Band)
- Power: 10 kW (average)

The AN/SPG-62 is a continuous wave fire-control radar developed by the United States, and it is currently deployed on warships equipped with the Aegis Combat System. It provides terminal target illumination for semi-active surface-to-air missiles. The antenna is mechanically steered, uses a parabolic reflector, and operates at 8 to 12 GHz (X Band). The system is a component of the Mk 99 fire-control system (FCS).

In accordance with the Joint Electronics Type Designation System (JETDS), the "AN/SPG-62" designation represents the 62nd design of an Army-Navy electronic device for waterborne fire control radar system. The JETDS system also now is used to name all Department of Defense electronic systems.

The first units were installed on the cruiser USS Ticonderoga, which was commissioned in 1983. Since then, the SPG-62 has been placed in service with many U.S. and foreign navy ships that have the Aegis Combat System.

The SPG-62's role in Aegis fire control is to illuminate targets in the terminal interception phase. First, the ship's main search radar detects and tracks the target. The Mk 99 FCS then launches surface-to-air missile(s) to intercept. If the interceptor missile uses semi-active radar homing, it will require an external radar to illuminate its target for terminal guidance, which is provided by the SPG-62. The Mk 99 FCS points an SPG-62 toward the target, and it outputs a narrow radar beam that reflects off the target. The interceptor missile's passive receiver homes in on these reflected emissions.

It uses a very narrow beam of radiofrequency (RF) radiation. This accomplishes four things:

- Provides very precise target tracking
- Gives the AN/SPG-62 a high radar resolution, which makes it more effective in determining if there is one contact or multiple contacts
- Enables the AN/SPG-62 to serve as a secondary, rudimentary search radar (in conjunction with the ship's main radar)
- Requires a relatively low level of energy to operate (10 kW peak power on average)

Because illumination is only needed for the last few seconds prior to interception, a ship can have more semi-active surface-to-air missiles in the air than it has SPG-62s. In the event of a saturation attack, the Aegis Combat System can time-share each AN/SPG-62 to serve multiple semi-active interceptors in the air at once.

== Users ==
Navy	Ship class	# of AN/SPG-62 per ship
Royal Australian Navy	Hobart-class destroyer	2
Japan Maritime Self-Defense Force	Atago-class destroyer	3
Japan Maritime Self-Defense Force	Maya-class destroyer	3
Japan Maritime Self-Defense Force	Kongō-class destroyer	3
Republic of Korea Navy	Sejong the Great-class destroyer	3
Royal Norwegian Navy	Fridtjof Nansen-class frigate	2
Spanish Navy	Álvaro de Bazán-class frigate	2
Spanish Navy	F110-class frigate	2
United States Navy	Arleigh Burke-class destroyer	3
United States Navy	Ticonderoga-class cruiser	4

== See also ==
- List of radars
- List of military electronics of the United States
