= JS Myōkō =

Kongō-class guided missile destroyer

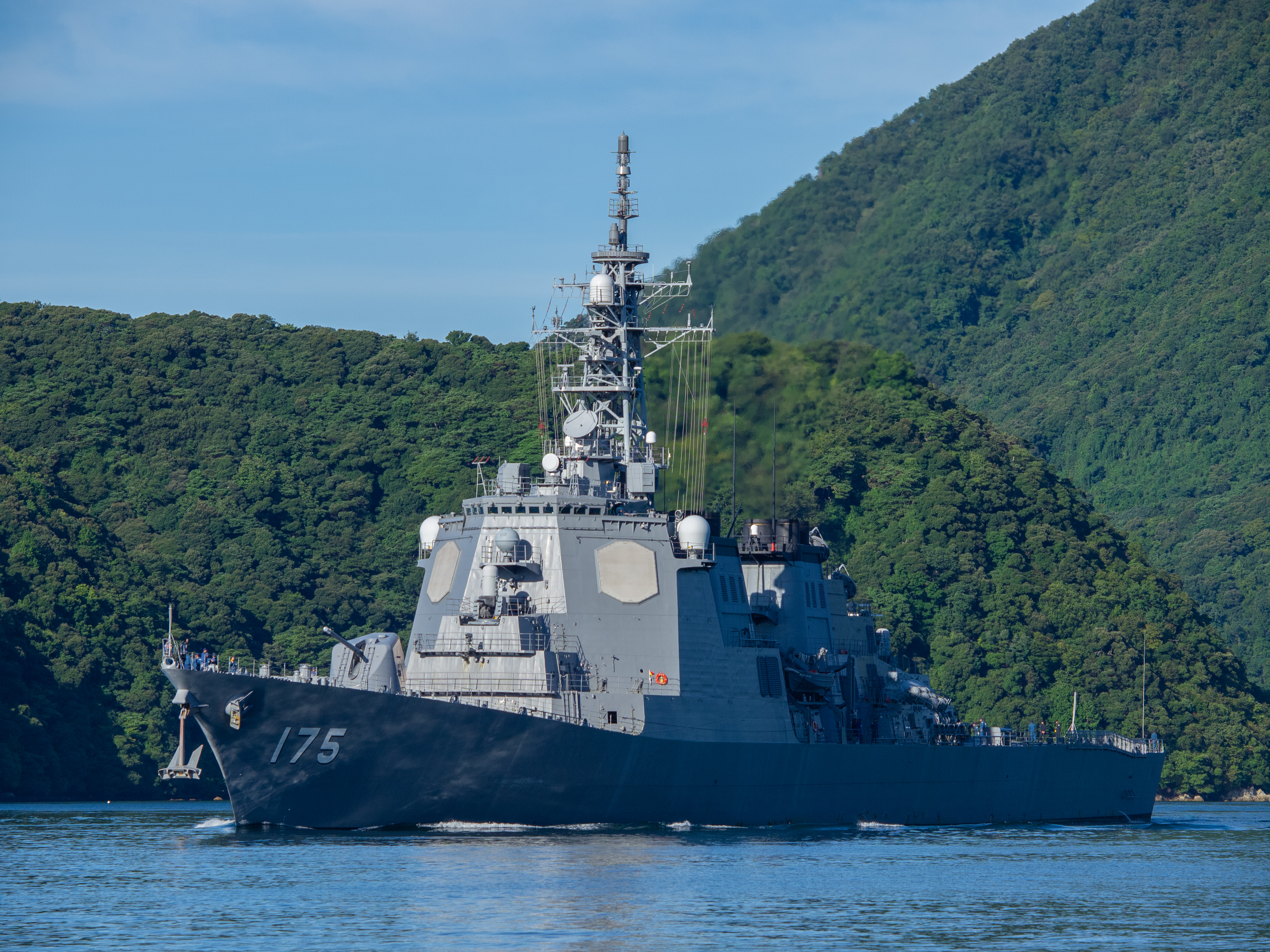
- JS Myōkō in Maizuru on 7 September 2009

History

Japan
- Name: Myōkō; (みょうこう)
- Namesake: Mount Myōkō
- Ordered: 1991
- Builder: Mitsubishi Heavy Industries
- Laid down: 8 April 1993
- Launched: 5 October 1994
- Commissioned: 14 March 1996
- Home port: Maizuru
- Identification: Pennant number: DDG-175
- Status: Active

General characteristics
- Class & type: Kongō-class destroyer
- Displacement: 7500 tons standard; 9500 tons full load
- Length: 528.2 ft (161.0 m)
- Beam: 68.9 ft (21.0 m)
- Draft: 20.3 ft (6.2 m)
- Propulsion: 4 Ishikawajima Harima/General Electric LM2500-30 gas turbines; two shafts, 100,000 shaft horsepower (75 MW)
- Speed: 30 knots (56 km/h)
- Range: 4,500 nautical miles at 20 knots; (8,334 km at 37 km/h)
- Complement: 300
- Sensors & processing systems: AN/SPY-1D; OPS-28 surface search radar; OQS-102 bow mounted sonar
- Electronic warfare & decoys: NOLQ-2 intercept / jammer
- Armament: 1 × 127 mm (5 in)/54 Caliber Oto Melara Compact Gun; 8 × RGM-84 Harpoon Anti-ship Missile in quad canisters; 2 × 20 mm Phalanx CIWS; 2 × HOS-302 triple torpedo tubes: Mark 46 torpedo; Type 73 torpedoes; 90-cell Mk. 41 Vertical Launching System: SM-2MR Surface-to-air missile; SM-3 Anti-ballistic missile; RUM-139 Anti-Submarine Rocket; RIM-162 Surface-to-air missile
- Aircraft carried: 1 × SH-60K helicopter

JS Myōkō (DDG-175) is a Kongō-class guided missile destroyer in the Japan Maritime Self-Defense Force (JMSDF). Myōkō was named after Mount Myōkō.

== Operational history ==
She was laid down by Mitsubishi Heavy Industries in Nagasaki, Nagasaki on 8 April 1993, launched on 5 October 1994; and commissioned on 14 March 1996.

In January 2008, it was announced that Lockheed Martin received a US$40.4 million contract modification to provide Aegis Ballistic Missile Defense System (BMD) capability to the Myōkō, the third Kongō-class destroyer to be so equipped.

On 2 December 2019, Captain Miho Otani became the first woman to take the command of an MSDF Aegis destroyer with the JS Myōkō. The ceremony took place in the port city of Maizuru.

== In popular culture ==
- The ship is featured in the 2012 film Battleship, where she and the USS Sampson are destroyed and sunk in the first battle against a trio of alien ships in the Pacific Ocean off the coast of Hawaii.

== Gallery ==
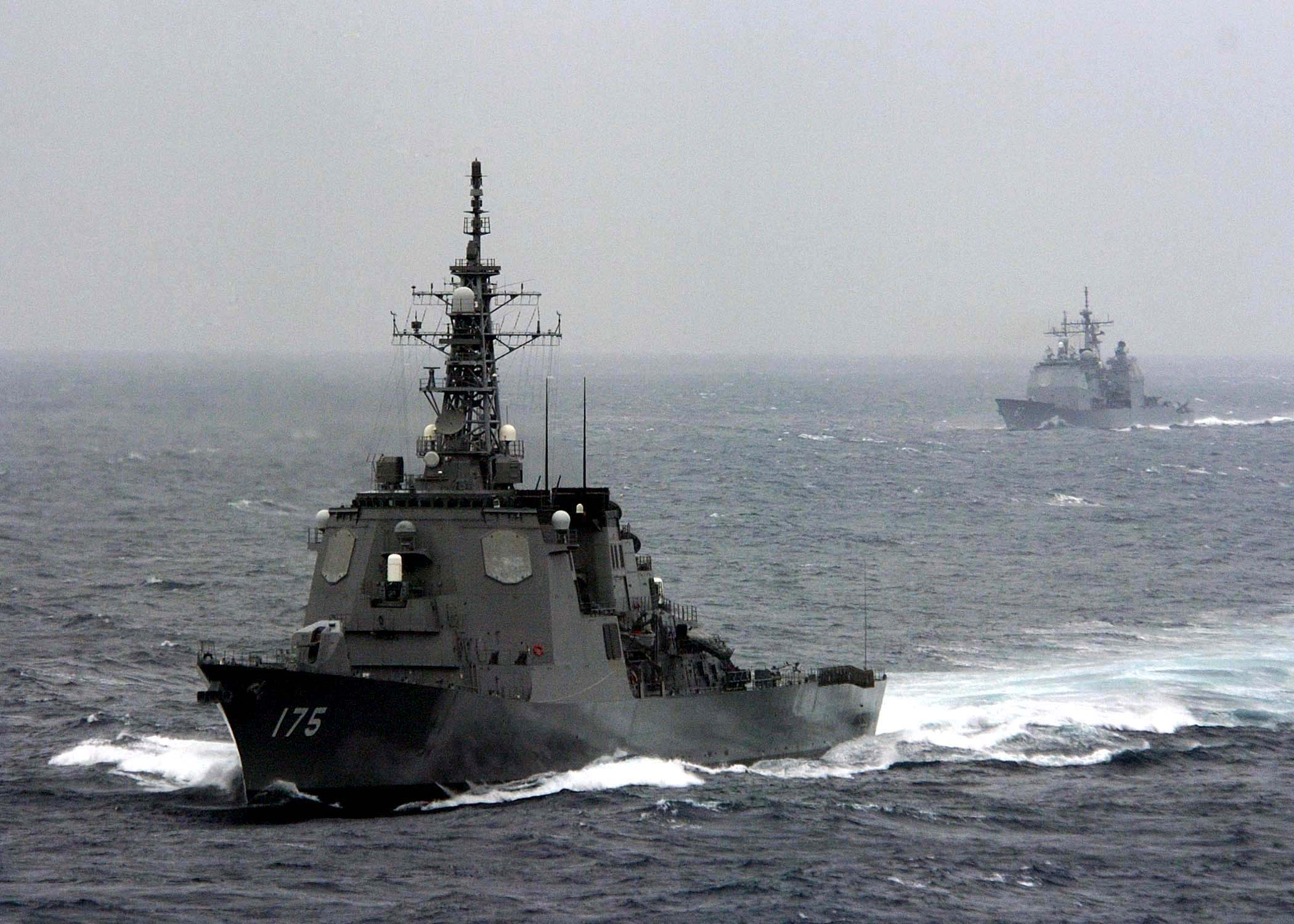
JS Myōkō and USS Shiloh on 9 June 2005

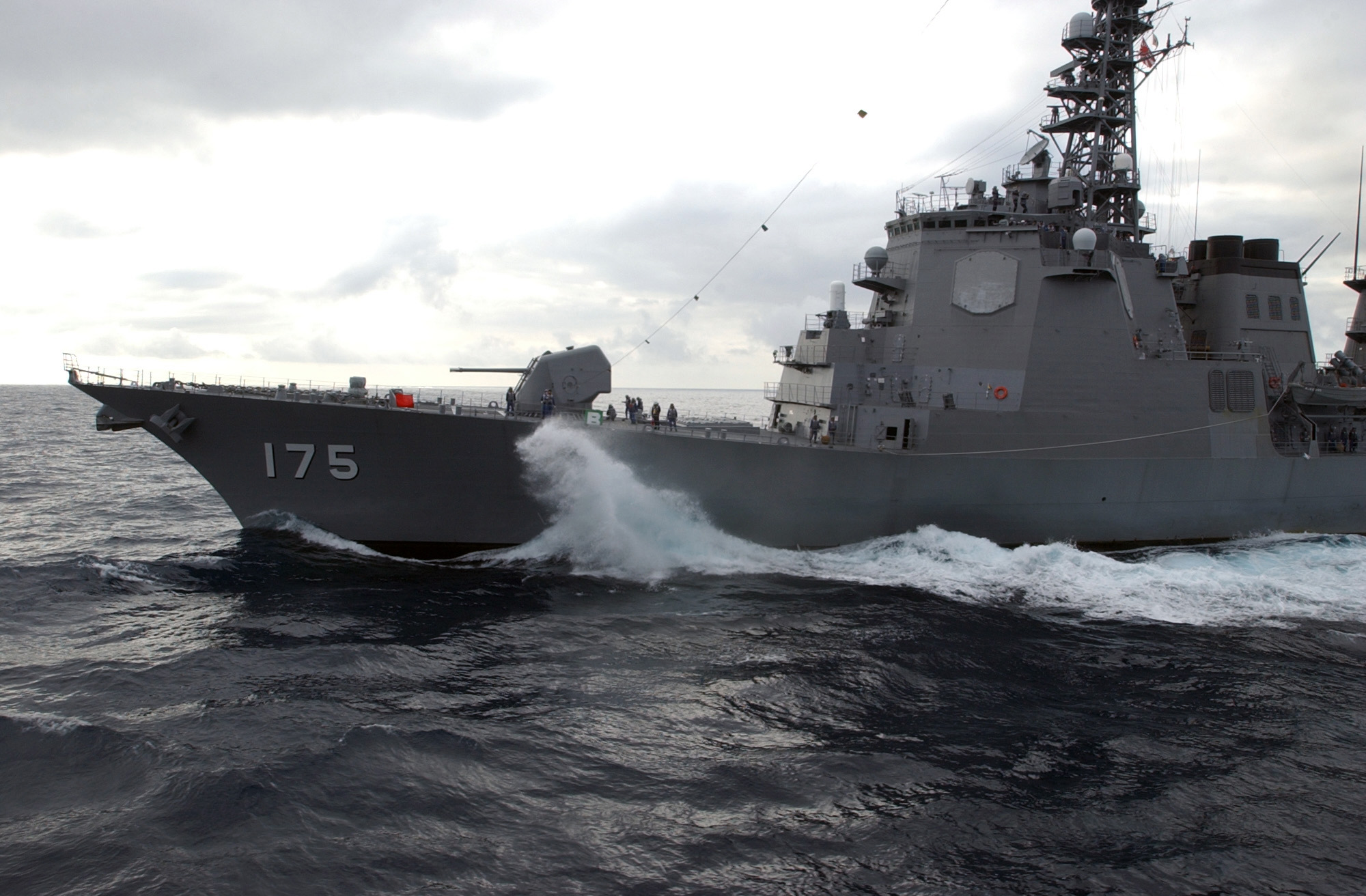
JS Myōkō underway on 18 March 2007

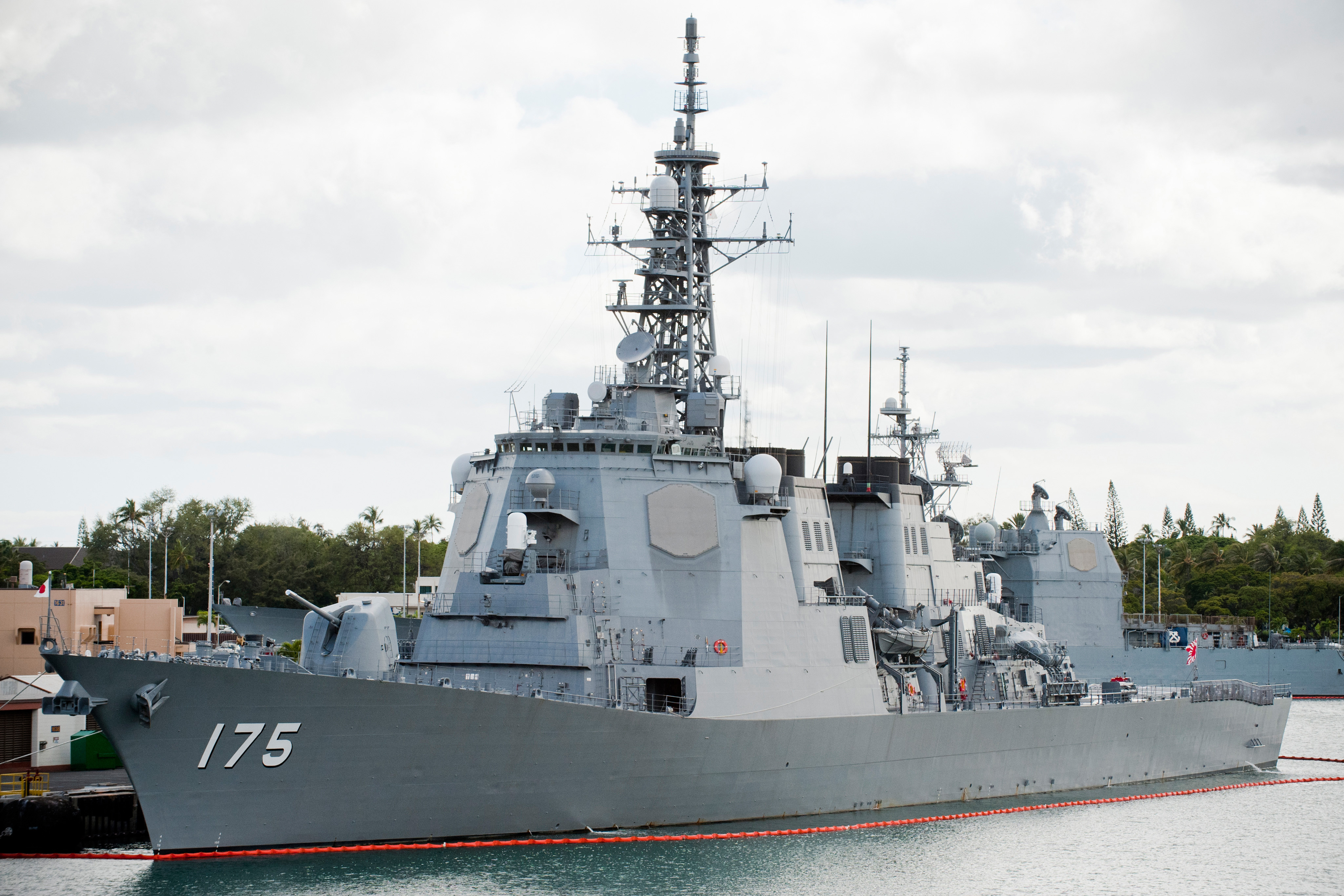
JS Myōkō at Pearl Harbor on 27 June 2012

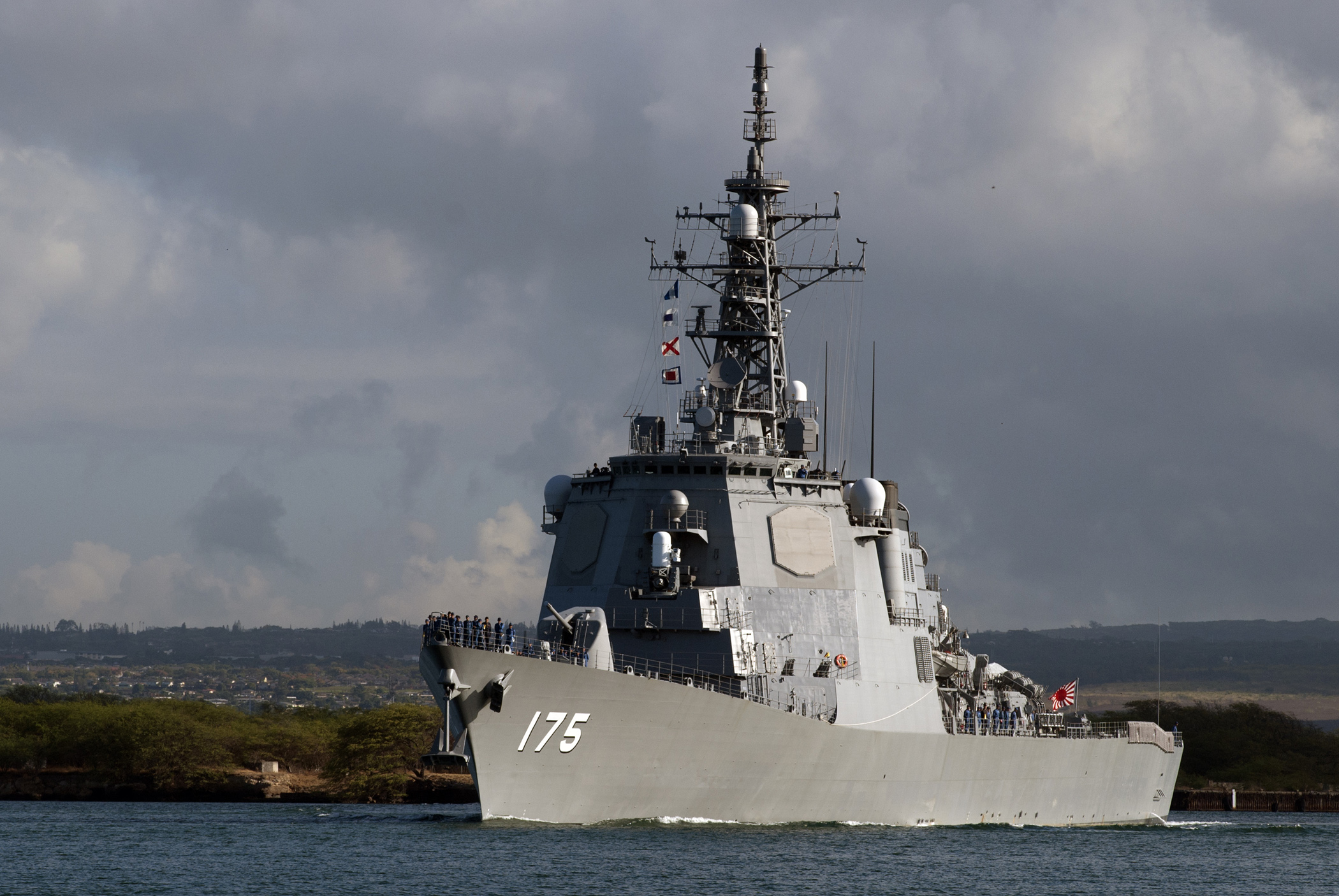
JS Myōkō at Pearl Harbor on 10 July 2012

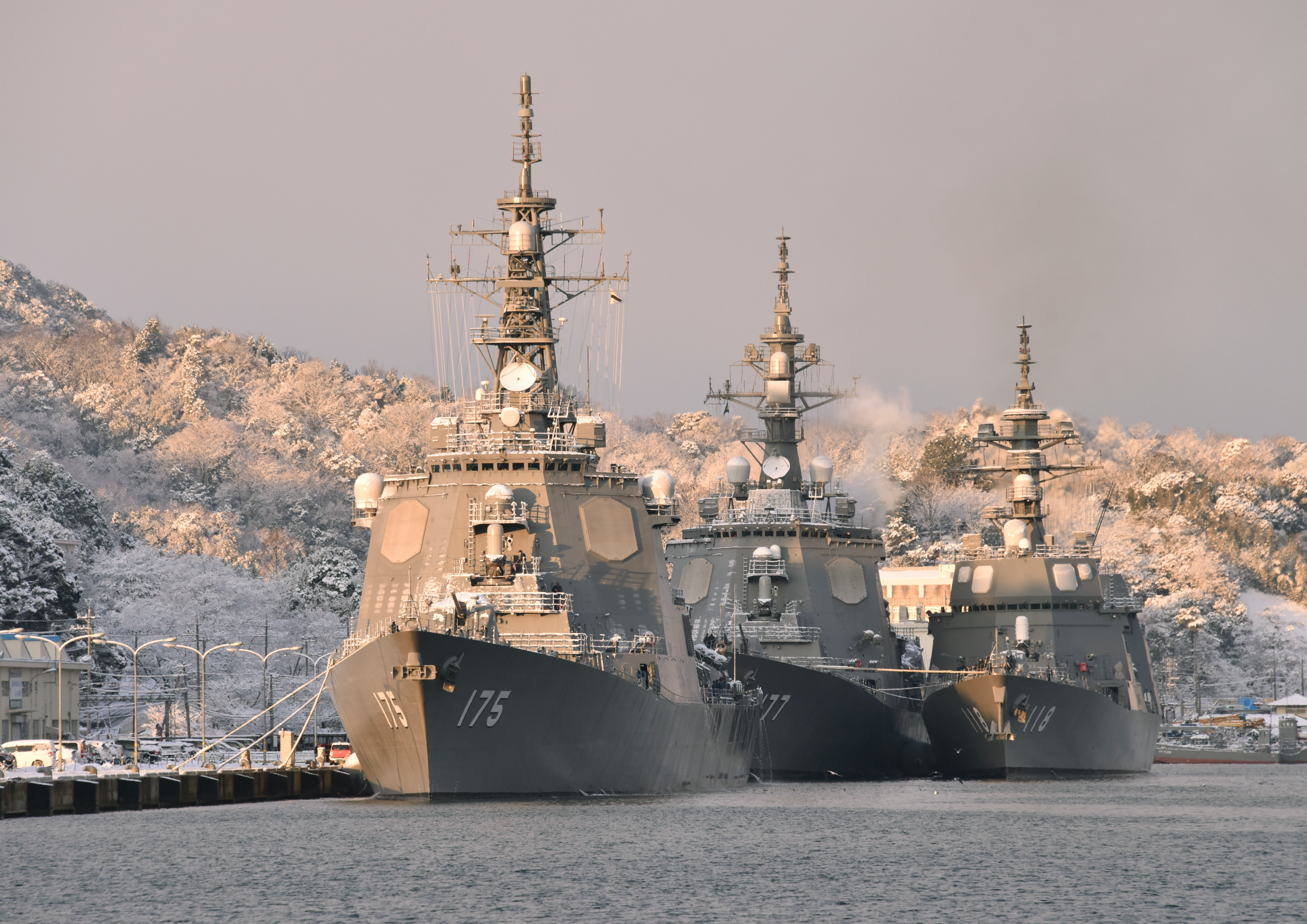
JS Myōkō docked with JS Atago and JS Fuyuzuki at Maizuru Naval Base, 23 February 2018

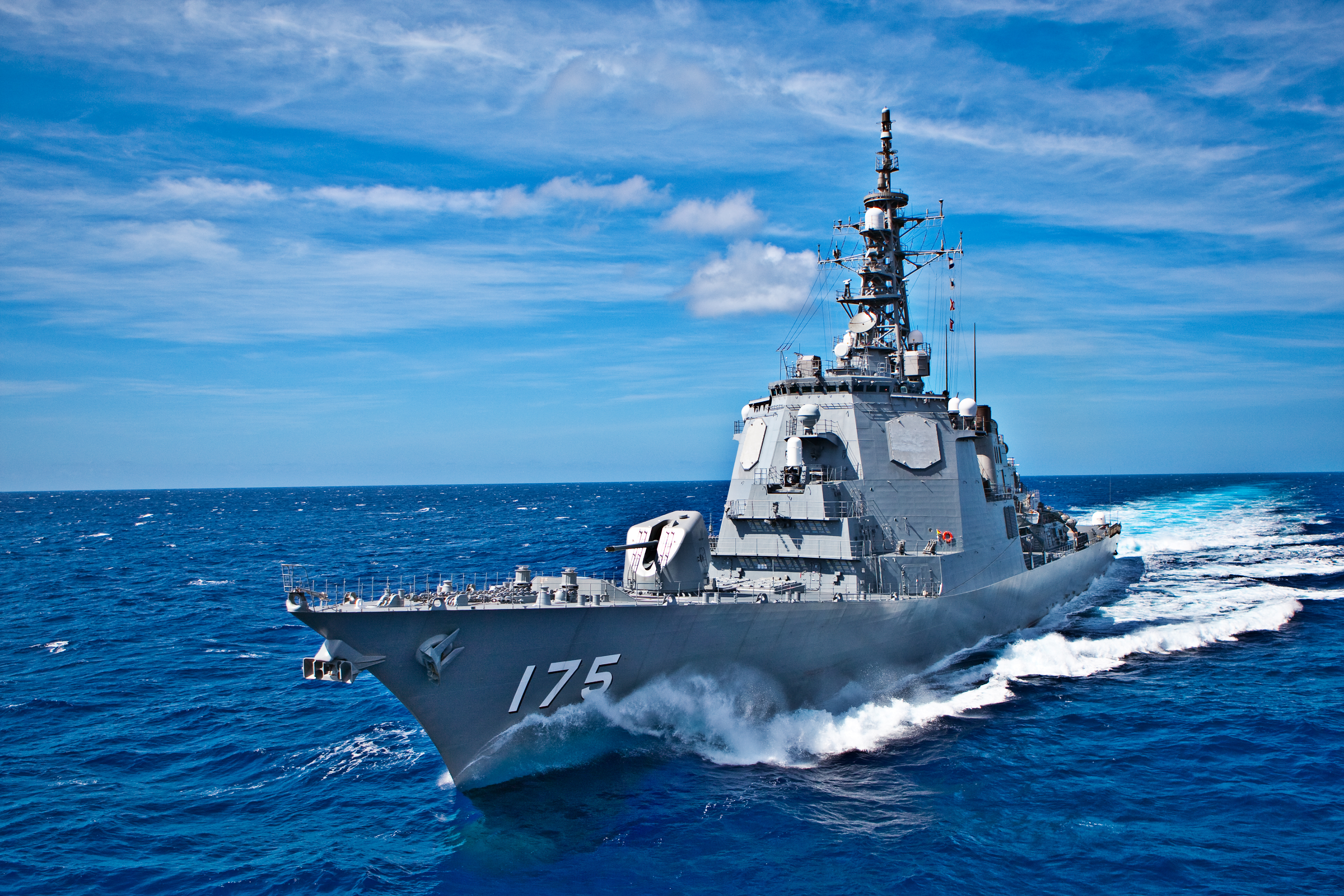
JS Myōkō underway 4 May 2021

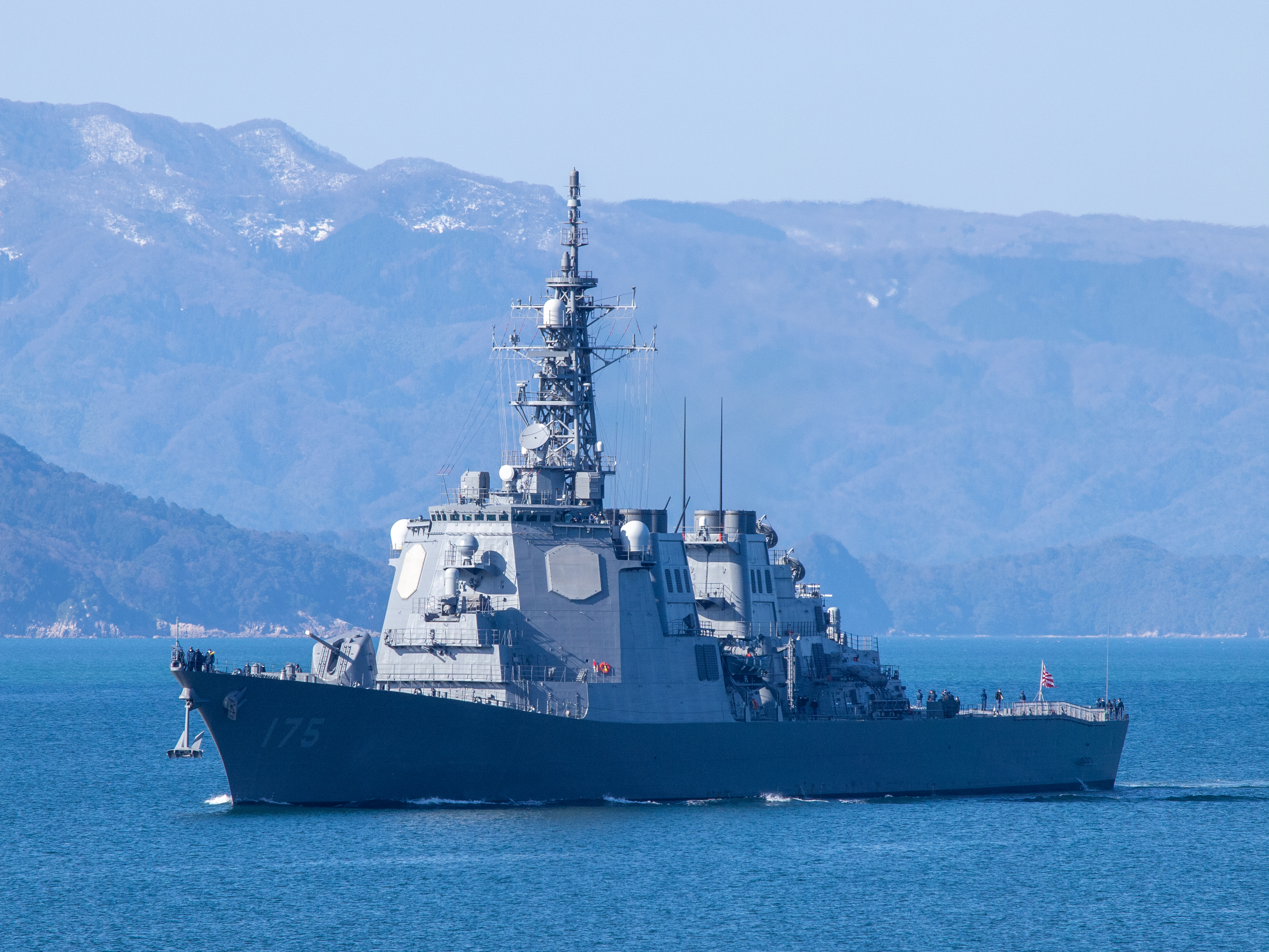
JS Myōkō, 12 January 2023
