= JS Kirishima =

Kongō-class guided missile destroyer

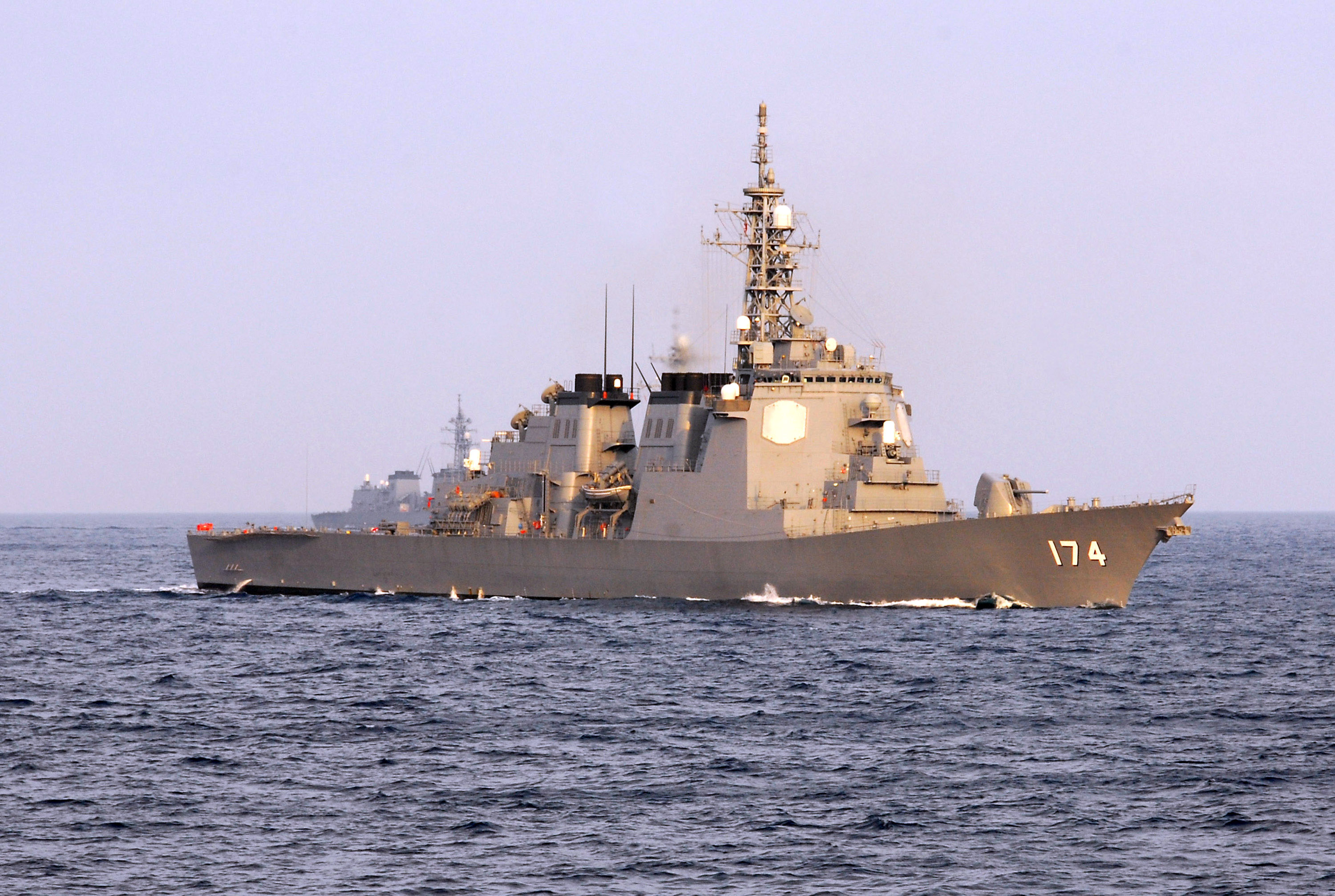
- JS Kirishima underway on 22 February 2008

History

Japan
- Name: Kirishima; (きりしま)
- Namesake: Mount Kirishima
- Ordered: 1990
- Builder: Mitsubishi Heavy Industries
- Laid down: 7 April 1992
- Launched: 19 August 1993
- Commissioned: 16 March 1995
- Home port: Yokosuka
- Identification: MMSI number: 431999506; Pennant number: DDG-174
- Status: Active

General characteristics
- Class & type: Kongō-class destroyer
- Displacement: 7500 tons standard; 9500 tons full load
- Length: 528.2 ft (161.0 m)
- Beam: 68.9 ft (21.0 m)
- Draft: 20.3 ft (6.2 m)
- Propulsion: 4 Ishikawajima Harima/General Electric LM2500-30 gas turbines; two shafts, 100,000 shaft horsepower (75 MW)
- Speed: 30 knots (56 km/h)
- Range: 4,500 nautical miles at 20 knots; (8,334 km at 37 km/h)
- Complement: 300
- Sensors & processing systems: AN/SPY-1D; OPS-28 surface search radar; OQS-102 bow mounted sonar
- Electronic warfare & decoys: NOLQ-2 intercept / jammer
- Armament: 1 × 127 mm (5 in)/54 Caliber Oto Melara Compact Gun; 8 × RGM-84 Harpoon Anti-ship Missile in quad canisters; 2 × 20 mm Phalanx CIWS; 2 × HOS-302 triple torpedo tubes: Mark 46 torpedo; Type 73 torpedoes; 90-cell Mk. 41 Vertical Launching System: SM-2MR Surface-to-air missile; SM-3 Anti-ballistic missile; RUM-139 Anti-Submarine Rocket; RIM-162 Surface-to-air missile
- Aircraft carried: 1 × SH-60K helicopter

JS Kirishima (DDG-174) is a Kongō-class guided missile destroyer in the Japan Maritime Self-Defense Force (JMSDF). Kirishima was named for Mount Kirishima. She was laid down by Mitsubishi Heavy Industries in Nagasaki, Nagasaki on 7 April 1992, and was launched on 19 August 1993.

It was not until 16 March 1995 that she was commissioned. She is based at the JMSDF base in Yokosuka, Kanagawa, and as of 2014, is the flagship of Rear Admiral Hidetoshi Iwasaki.

== History ==
In 2003 the Kirishima was deployed to the Indian Ocean as logistical support for US forces engaged in the war on terror. This prompted some opposition including protests and boatloads of protesters attempting to block the ship from leaving its harbor at Yokosuka. It was later replaced in the deployment by the destroyer JS Kongō.

Kirishima underwent modification at Nagasaki to add the Aegis Ballistic Missile Defense System (BMD) capability to its weapons suite.

This ship was one of several in the JMSDF fleet participating in disaster relief after the 2011 Tōhoku earthquake and tsunami.

The ship was also deployed in preparation for North Korea's launch of Kwangmyŏngsŏng-3 in March 2012.

From 26 June to 1 August 2014, Kirishima participated in RIMPAC alongside JS Ise. In November, it participated in the Keen Sword 15 exercises with the US. The ship was responsible for guarding the USS George Washington, the US aircraft carrier then forward-deployed to Japan.

== In popular culture ==
- Kirishima is featured in the opening sequence of the 12th episode of the 2010 anime series Highschool of the Dead assisting JS Kongō in ballistic missile defense.

== Gallery ==
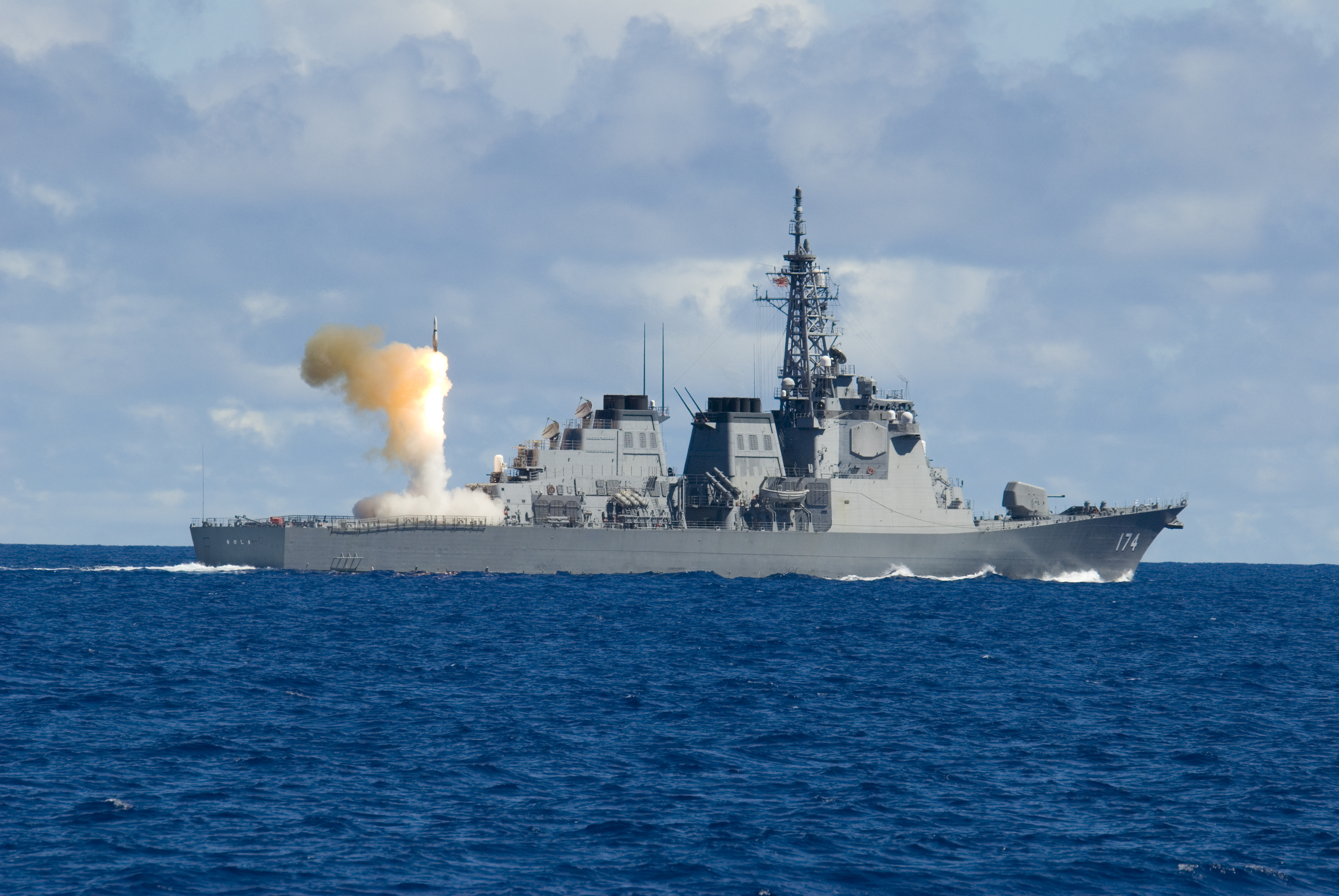
JS Kirishima, date unknown

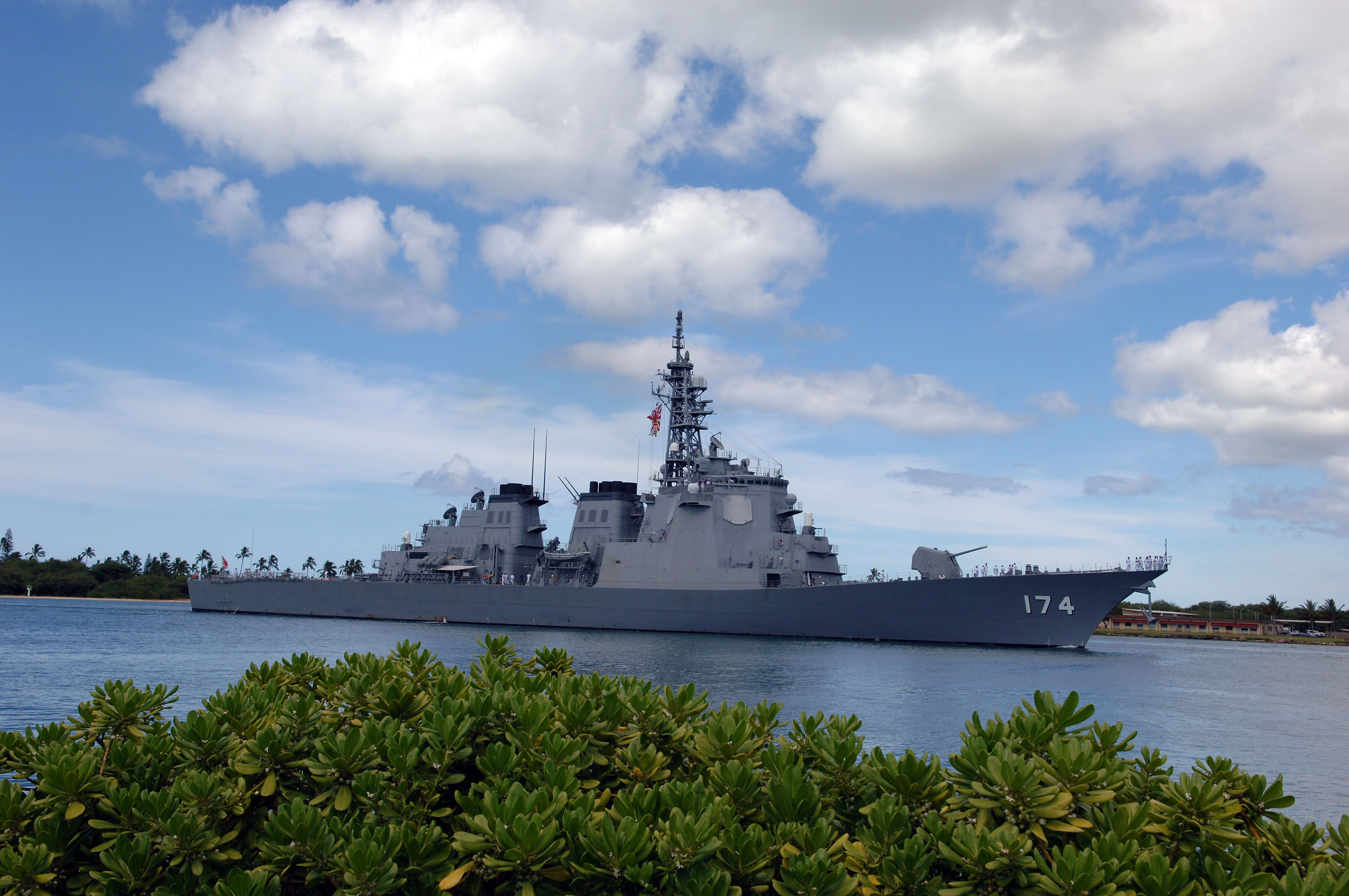
JS Kirishima pulls into Pearl Harbor before RIMPAC, 26 June 2008

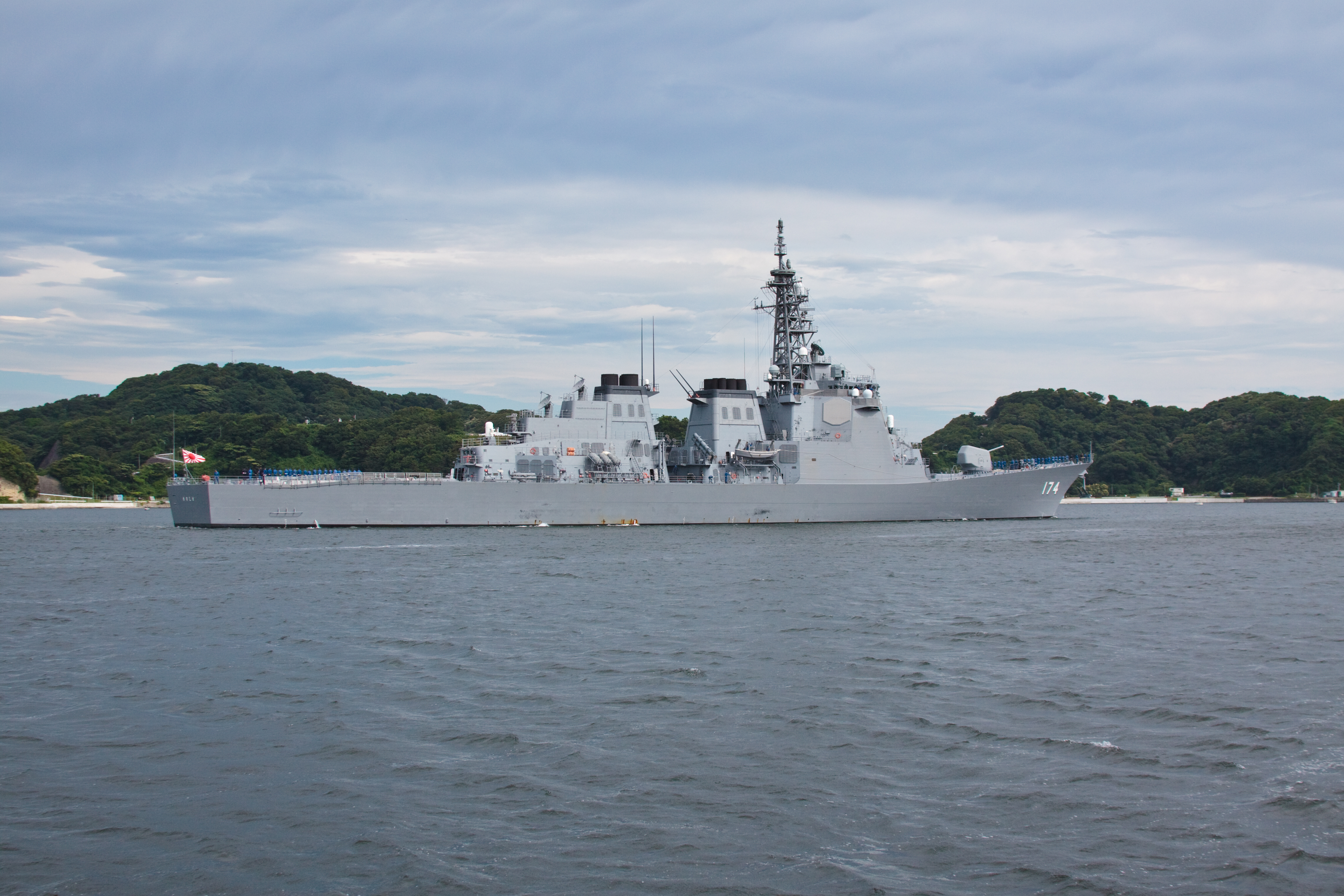
JS Kirishima at Yokosuka on 13 July 2009

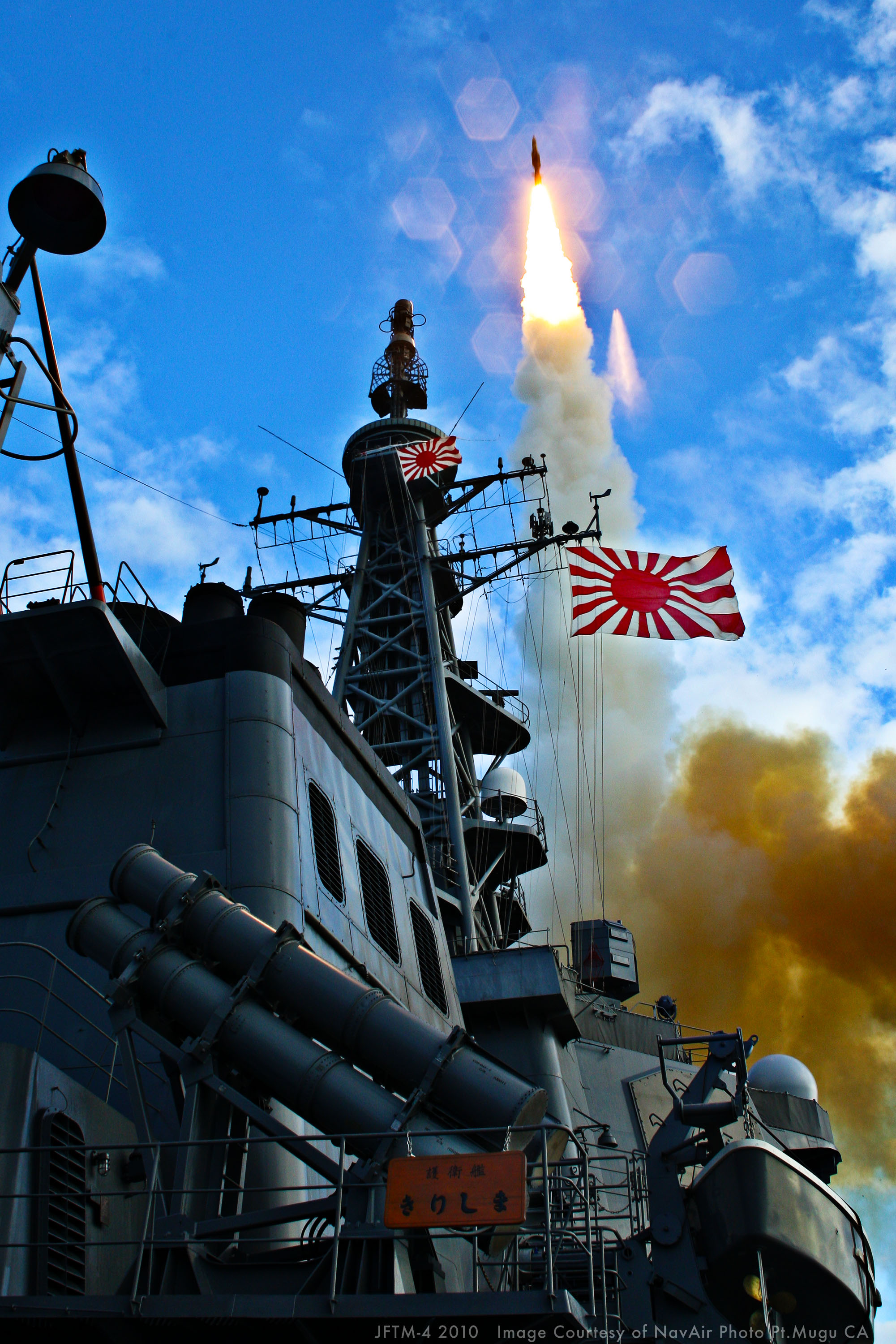
JS Kirishima launching a SM-3 on 29 October 2010

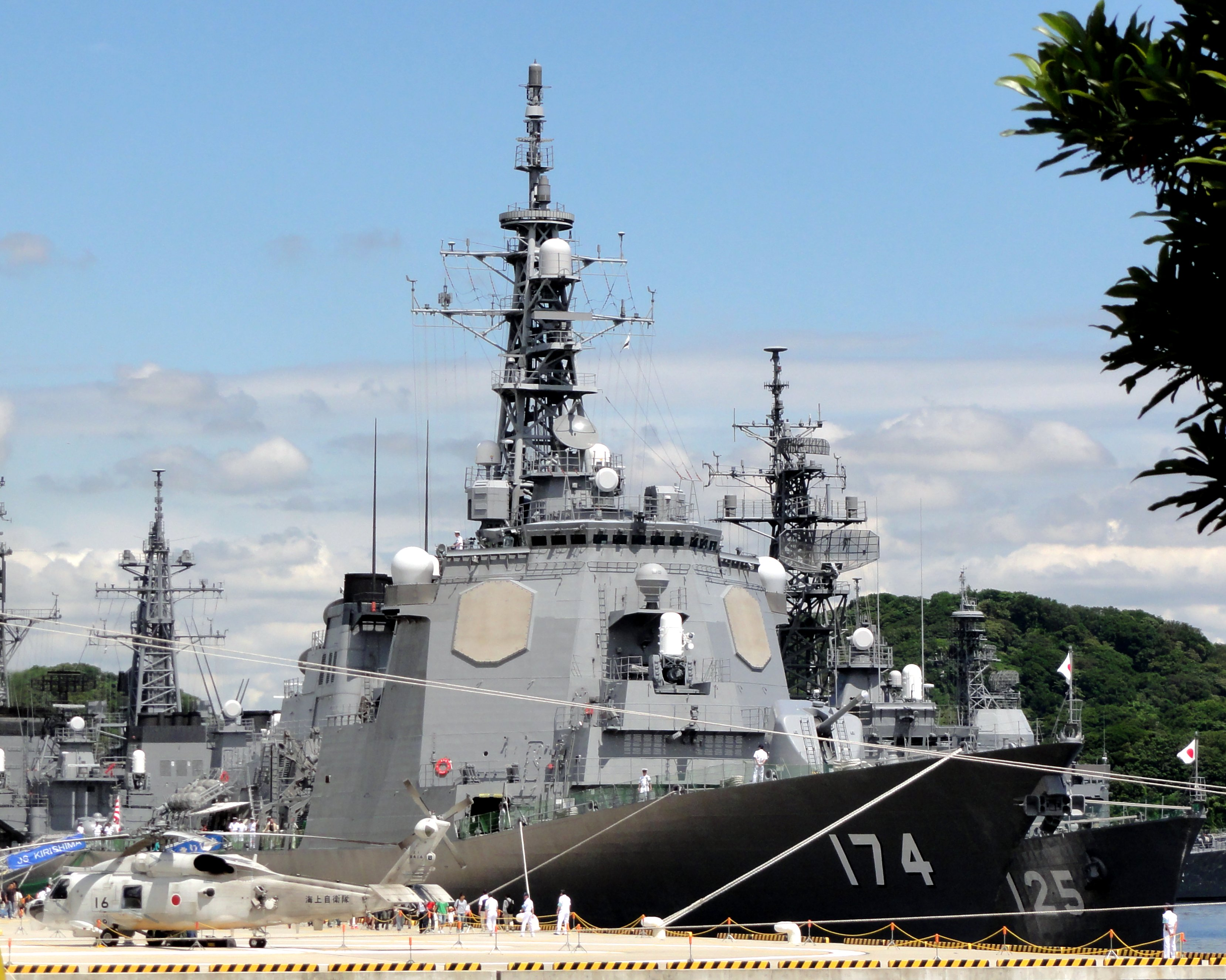
JS Kirishima and JS Sawayuki on 10 June 2012

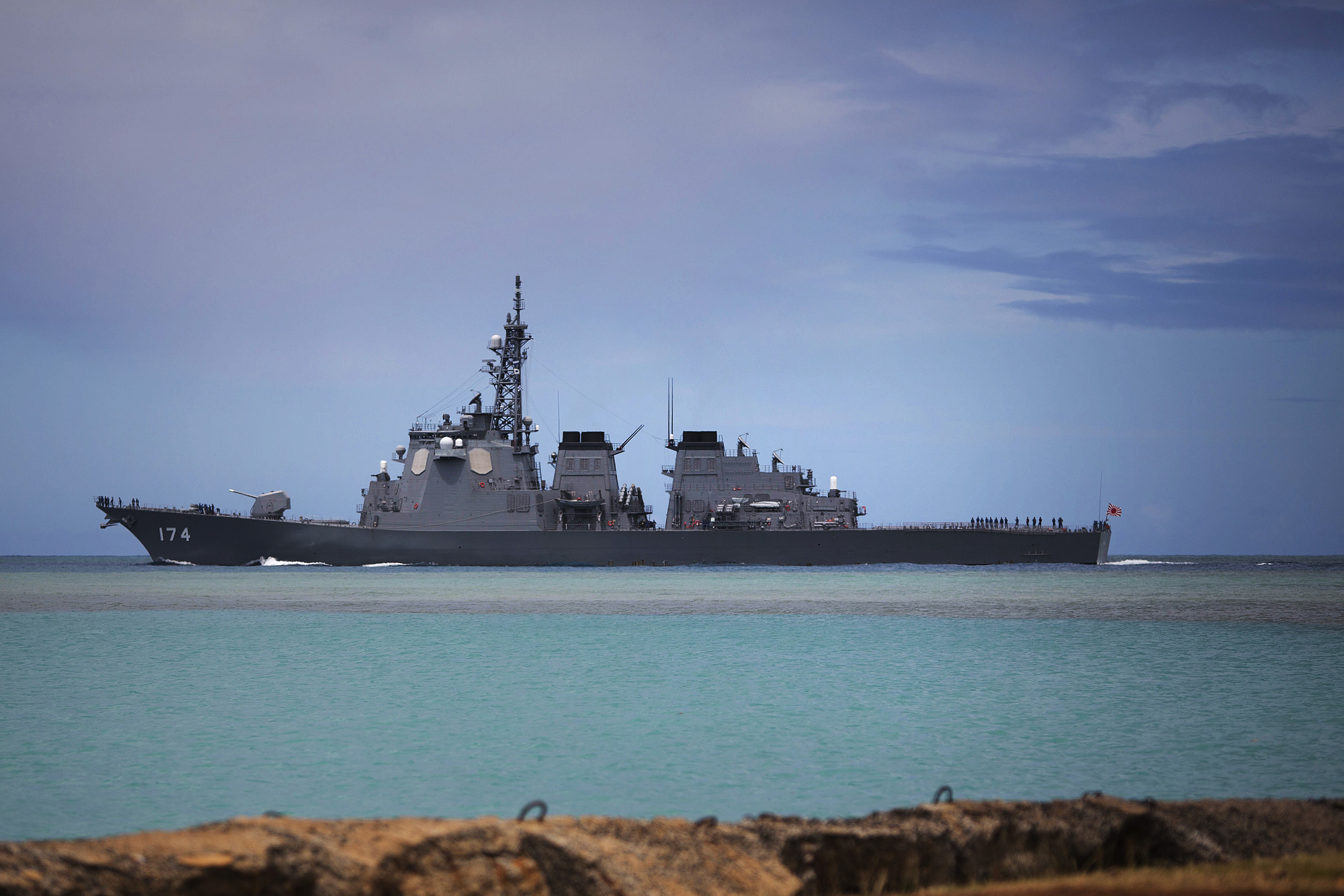
JS Kirishima at Pearl Harbor on 7 July 2014

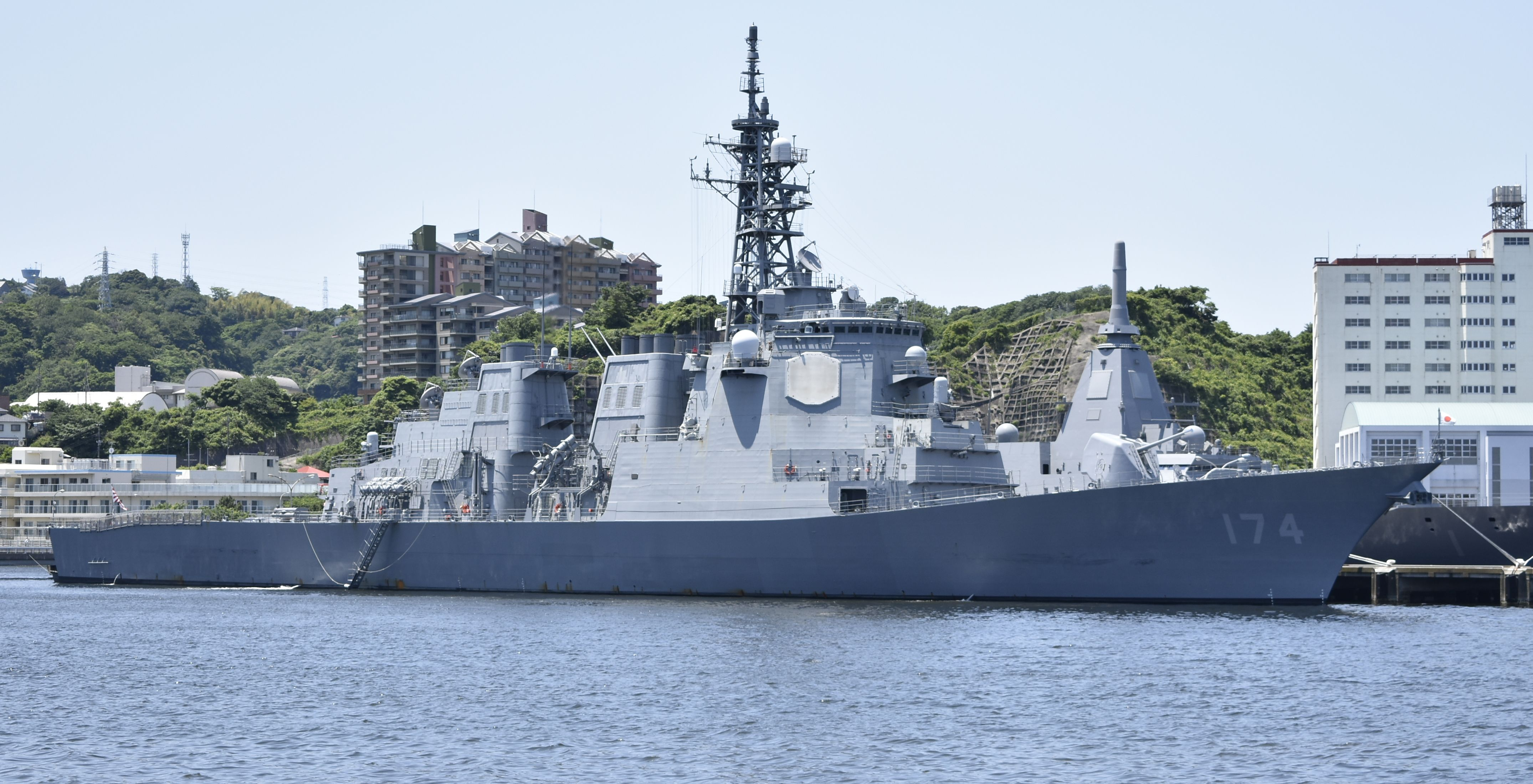
JS Kirishima moored next to JS Mogami, 24 May 2022
