= Kongō-class destroyer =

Guided-missile destroyer class in the Japanese Maritime Self-Defense Forces

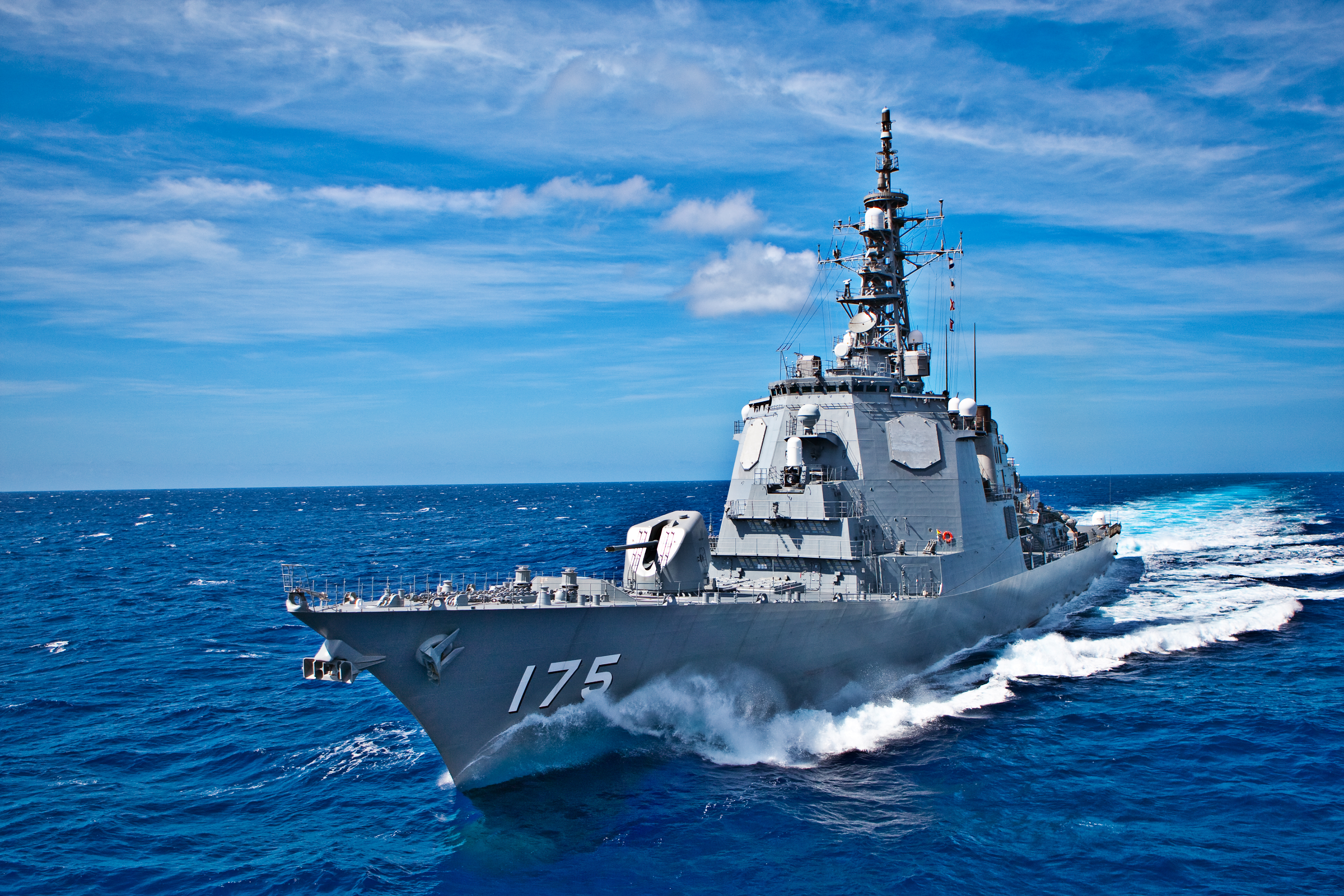
- A port-front view of the JS Myōkō

Class overview
- Name: Kongō class
- Builders: Mitsubishi Heavy Industries (3); Ishikawajima-Harima HI (1)
- Operators: Japan Maritime Self-Defense Force
- Preceded by: Hatakaze class
- Succeeded by: Atago class
- Built: 1990 - 1998
- In commission: 1993 -
- Completed: 4
- Active: 4

General characteristics
- Type: Large guided-missile destroyer
- Displacement: 7,250 tons standard; 9,500 tons full load
- Length: 161 m (528 ft)
- Beam: 21 m (69 ft)
- Draft: 6.2 m (20 ft)
- Propulsion: 4 Ishikawajima Harima/General Electric LM2500-30 gas turbines; two shafts, 100,000 shp (75,000 kW)
- Speed: 30 knots (56 km/h; 35 mph)
- Range: 4,500 nautical miles (8,300 km; 5,200 mi) at 20 knots (37 km/h; 23 mph)
- Complement: 300
- Sensors & processing systems: AN/SPY-1D PESA radar; OPS-28C or D surface-search radar; OPS-20 navigation radar; 3 × AN/SPG-62 fire-control radar; OQS-102 bow-mounted sonar; OQR-2 towed array sonar
- Electronic warfare & decoys: NOLQ-2 ECM intercept and jammer; 4 × Mark 36 SRBOC Chaff and Decoy Launching System; Type 4 towed anti-torpedo decoy
- Armament: 1 × 127 mm (5 in)/54 Caliber Oto Melara Compact Gun; 8 × RGM-84 Harpoon Anti-ship Missile in quad canisters; 2 × 20 mm Phalanx CIWS; 2 × HOS-302 triple torpedo tubes: Mark 46 torpedo; Type 73 torpedoes; 90-cell Mk 41 Vertical Launching System: SM-2MR Surface-to-air missile; SM-3 Anti-ballistic missile; RUM-139 Anti-Submarine Rocket; RIM-162 Surface-to-air missile; Tomahawk cruise missile
- Aircraft carried: 1 × SH-60J/K helicopter
- Aviation facilities: Helicopter deck only

The Kongō class (こんごう型護衛艦, Kongō-gata Goeikan) of large guided-missile destroyers in the Japan Maritime Self-Defense Force are equipped with the Aegis Combat System, and is the first of few ship classes outside the United States to have that capability. Following a decision made in December 2003, Japan is upgrading their Kongo-class destroyers with Aegis Ballistic Missile Defense System. The upgrade involves a series of installations and flight tests to take place from 2007 to 2010. JS Kongo was the first ship to have the BMD upgrade installed.

== Background ==
The JMSDF built JDS Amatsukaze (DDG-163) under FY1960 program and started shipboard operation of surface-to-air missiles. She had been equipped with analog-version of the Tartar Guided Missile Fire Control System. A fully-digitized system was adopted on the next-generation Tachikaze class, and later a combat direction system based on the Naval Tactical Data System was added.

Nevertheless, the JMSDF estimated that its fleets would not survive against Soviet airstrikes, especially Tupolev Tu-22M bombers using AS-4 air-to-surface missiles. Based on these estimates, JMSDF began to pursue the introduction of the Aegis Weapon System (AWS) from the early 1980s. In 1984, with the prospect of deploying AWS, concrete implementation plans began. And the construction of Japanese first Aegis-equipped ships, Kongo class, had begun under the FY1988 program.

== Design ==
The overall design is generally modeled on the Arleigh Burke-class destroyers of the U.S. Navy. The hull adopted shelter deck design as with preceding Japanese destroyers, but it was widened to support the superstructure with four PESA antennas just as Arleigh Burke class. Due to this widened hull, the outer panel is inclined to reduce the width of the waterline, which also has the effect of reducing radar cross section area.

Because they are built to different operational requirements than the Arleigh Burke-class destroyers, such as for carrying extra commanding equipment, the Kongō-class ships' internal arrangement is quite different from the original design on which they are based. Recognisable external features are the vertical mast and enlarged superstructure to carry sufficient headquarters equipment so that they could act as a flagship.

The propulsion systems are almost the same as those of the Arleigh Burke class, powered by four Ishikawajima-Harima LM2500 gas turbines giving them a top speed of 30 knots (56 km/h; 35 mph).

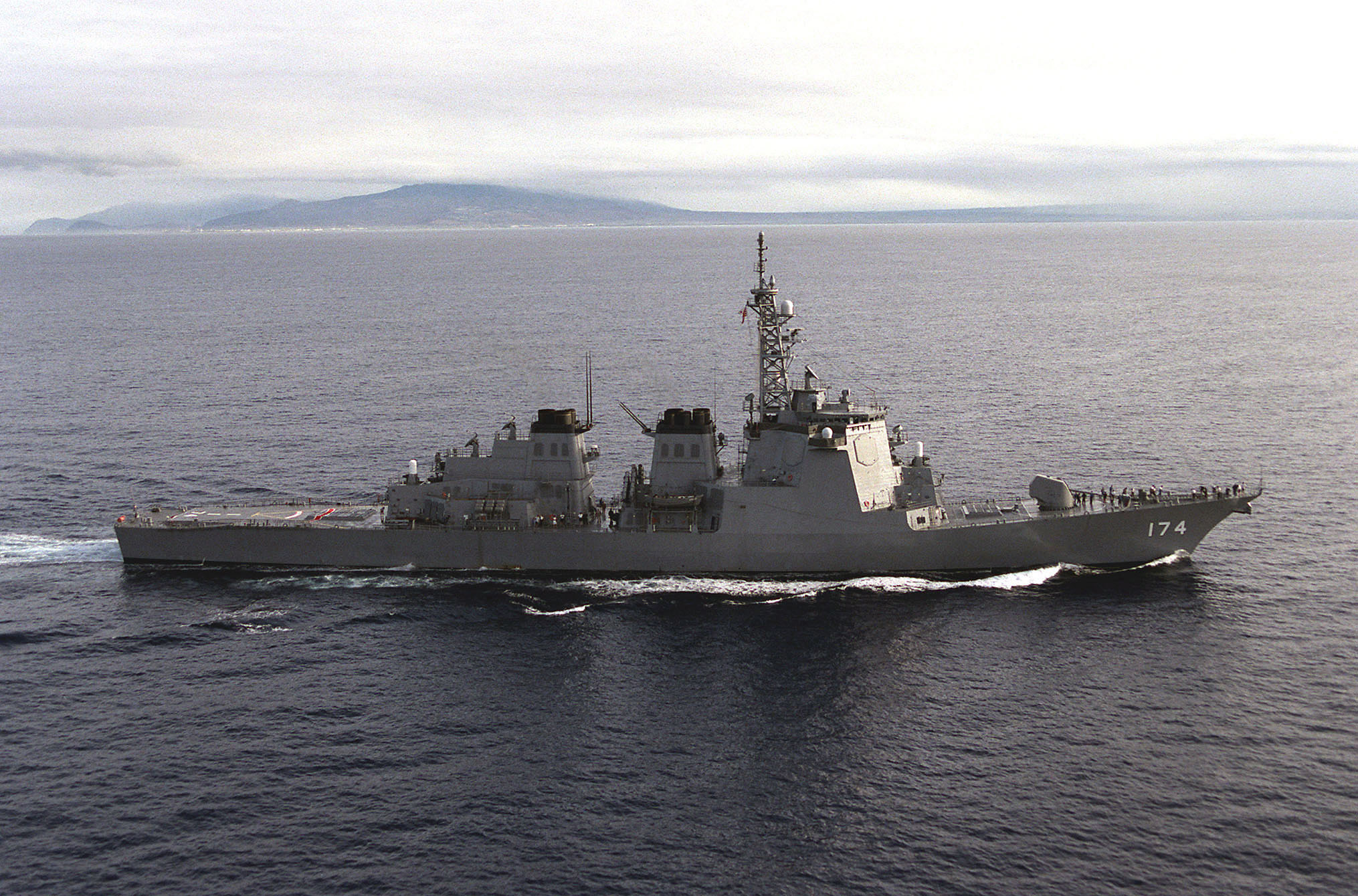
Starboard beam view of the JS Kirishima

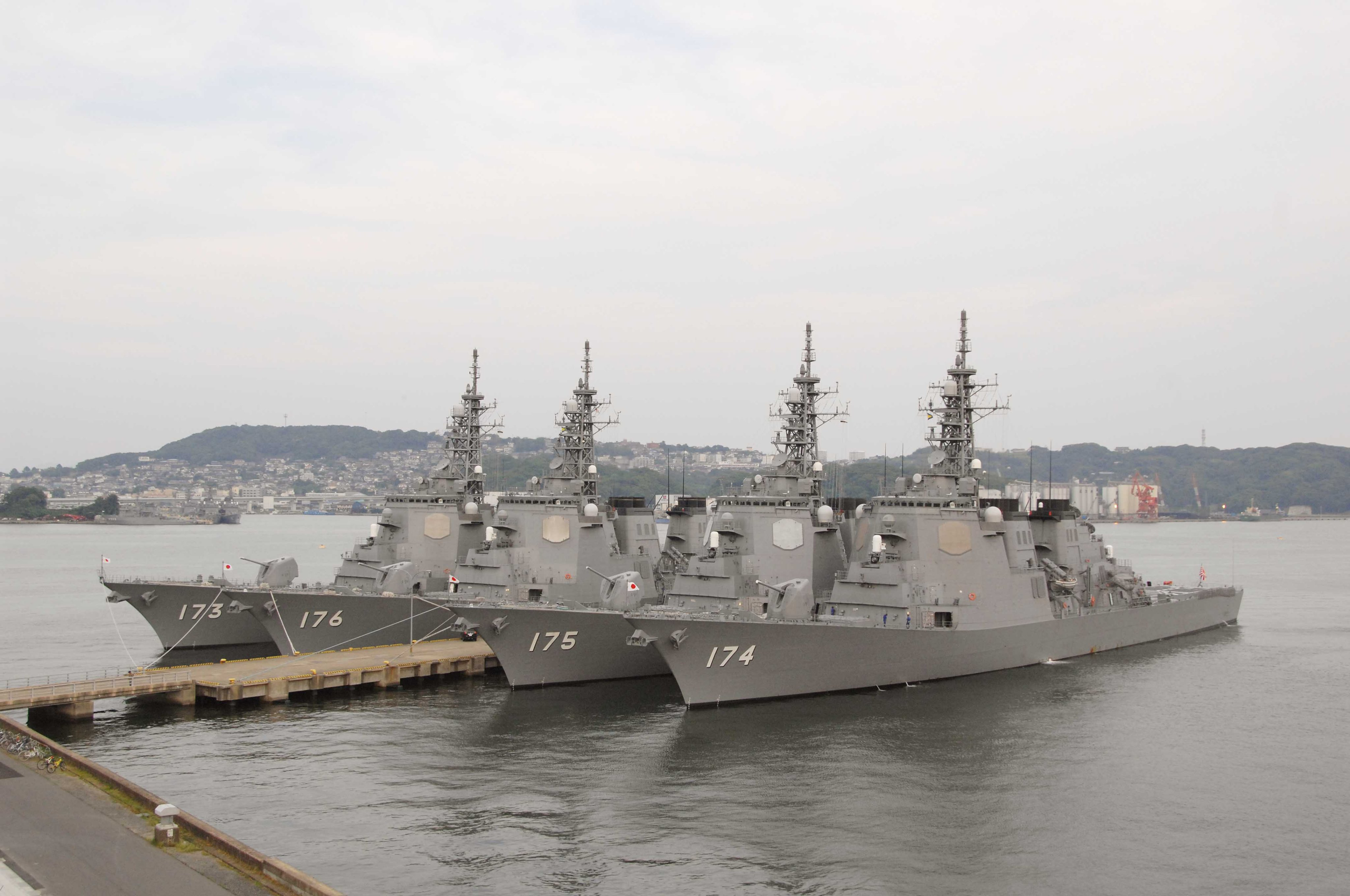
All four Kongo-class destroyers at Sasebo

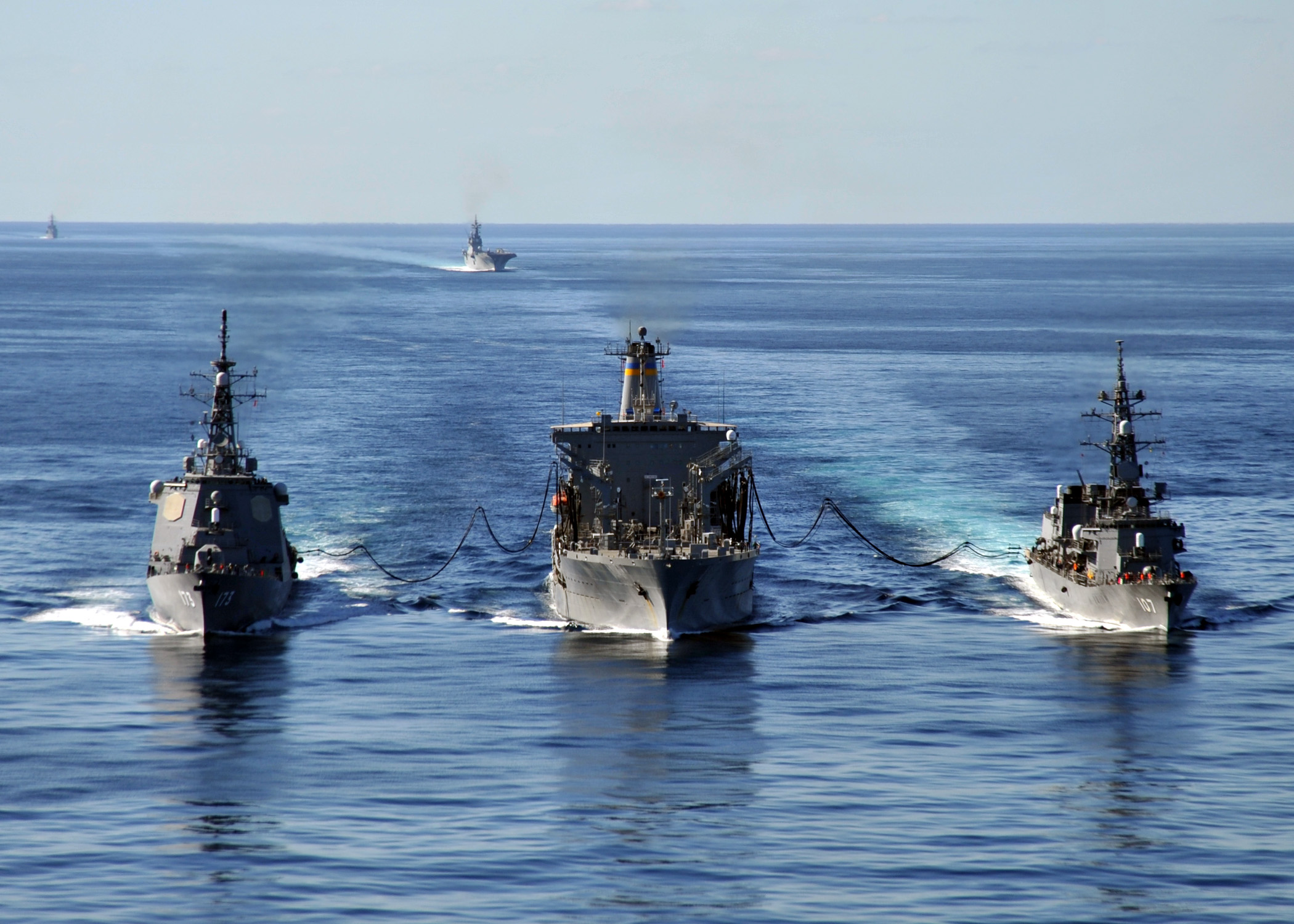
Kongō and Ikazuchi being refueled

== Equipment ==
The class is equipped with the Aegis Weapon System (AWS). The system version was Baseline 4 for name-ship through the third ship, and Baseline 5 for fourth ships immediately after they were put into service; then all ships were updated to Baseline 5.3 with modernization. The class uses the AN/SPY-1D as the main radar. As surface-to-air missiles, the SM-2MR Block IIIA was initially used, and later the Block IIIB came into use. Since the mid-2000s, they have also been equipped with a missile defense capability with the primary intention of countering North Korean ballistic missiles, and now have an Aegis BMD 3.6 system installed to launch SM-3 Block IA and IB missiles.

The Mark 41 Vertical Launching System arrangement, similar to the Arleigh Burke class, consisted of 29 cells on the foredeck and 61 cells on the afterdeck. These cells contain not only RIM-162, SM-2, and SM-3, but also VL-ASROCs. In addition, they are equipped with HOS-302, one of the Japanese variant of the Mark 32 Surface Vessel Torpedo Tubes, as anti-submarine weapons and Harpoon as anti-ship missiles. And as gunnery weapons, an Oto Melara 127 mm (5 in)/54 caliber gun and two Mark 15 20 mm CIWS gun mounts are installed.

Most of electronic devices outside of AWS originated in Japan. For electronic warfare, this class is equipped with NOLQ-2, an elaborate system capable of both ES and EA. The OQS-102 sonar is equivalent to the U.S. SQS-53C.

=== Flight tests for Aegis BMD systems ===
In December 2007, Japan conducted a successful test of the SM-3 block IA against a ballistic missile aboard Kongō. This was the first time a Japanese ship was selected to launch the interceptor missile during a test of the Aegis Ballistic Missile Defense System. In previous tests, they provided tracking and communications. Afterward, Japan has also undertaken another two successful Ballistic Missile Defense tests aboard Myōkō in October 2009 and aboard Kirishima in October 2010, while one test aboard Chōkai in November 2008 failed to intercept the target.

== Names ==
The Kongō-class destroyers are named after mountains in Japan.

== Ships in the class ==
Building no.	Pennant no.	Name	Laid down	Launched	Commissioned	Homeport
2313	DDG-173	Kongō	8 May 1990	26 September 1991	25 March 1993	Sasebo
2314	DDG-174	Kirishima	7 April 1992	19 August 1993	16 March 1995	Yokosuka
2315	DDG-175	Myōkō	8 April 1993	5 October 1994	14 March 1996	Maizuru
2316	DDG-176	Chōkai	29 May 1995	27 August 1996	20 March 1998	Sasebo

== See also ==
- List of destroyer classes in service

Equivalent destroyers of the same era

- Arleigh Burke class
- Durand de la Penne class
- Project 956E
