= Mitsugu Ihara =

Japanese admiral

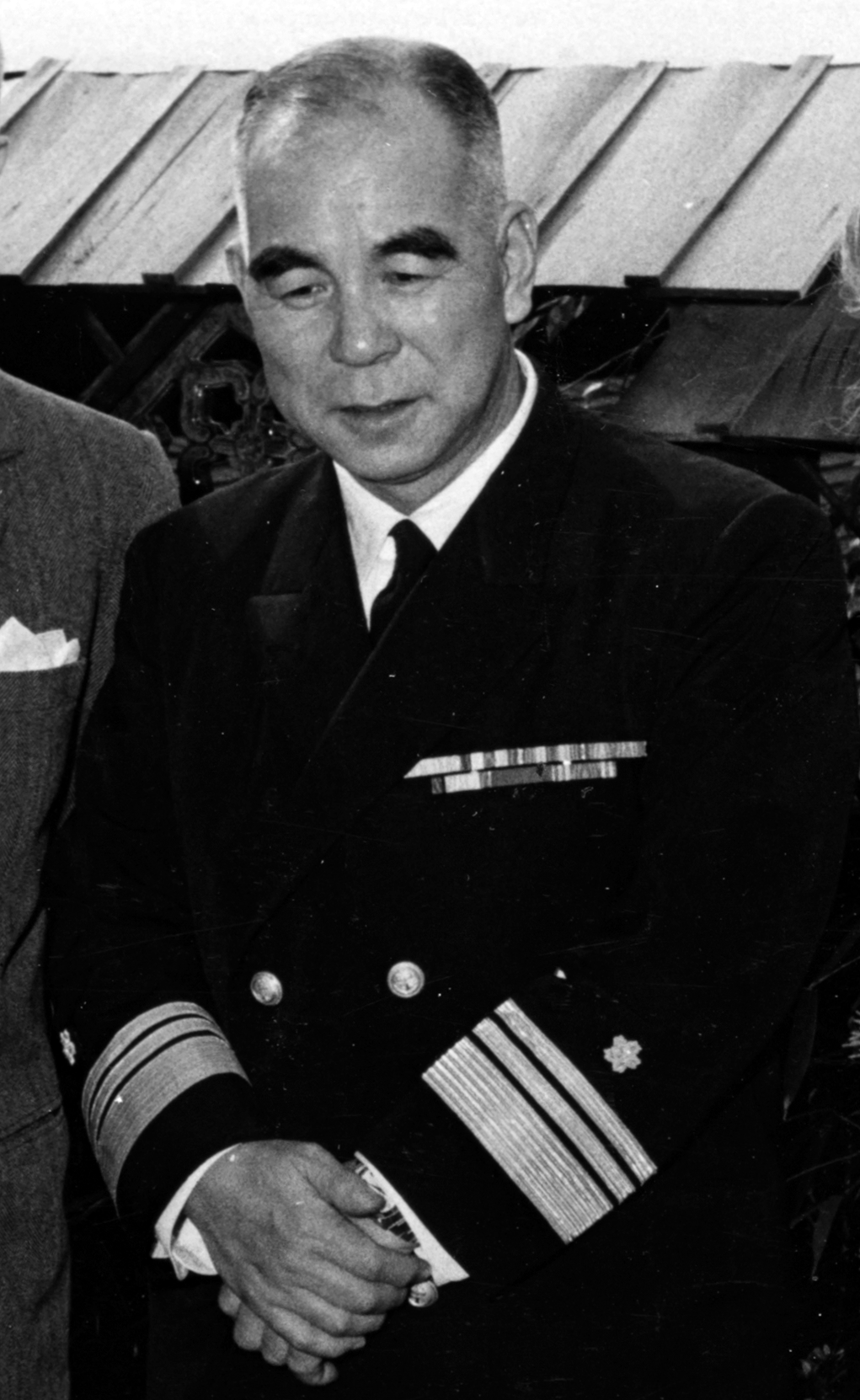
- Born: 3 October 1903; Hyōgo Prefecture
- Died: 31 March 1979 (age 75); Chiba Prefecture
- Military career
- Allegiance: Japan
- Branch: Imperial Japanese Navy; Japan Coast Guard; Safety Security Force; Japan Maritime Self-Defense Force
- Service years: 1921-1945 (Imperial Japanese Navy); 1953-1954 (Safety Security Force); 1954-1961 (Japan Maritime Self-Defense Force)
- Rank: Captain (IJN); Vice Admiral (JMSDF)
- Commands: Escort Flotilla 1 Self Defense Fleet; Chief of Staff, Maritime Self-Defense Force
- Awards: See Awards

Vice Admiral Mitsugu Ihara (庵原貢, Iohara Mitsugu; 3 October 1903 – 31 March 1979) was a Japanese naval officer who served in both the Imperial Japanese Navy from 1920 to 1945 and the Japanese Maritime Self Defence Force (JMSDF) from 1954 to 1960. He was the third Chief of Staff of the JMSDF succeeding Yasumaro Kiguchi. In 1961, he was succeeded by Nobuo Fukuchi.

== Career ==
Born in Hyōgo prefecture. He entered the Toyooka Junior High School (currently Hyōgo Prefectural Toyooka High School).

In July 1921, he entered the Imperial Japanese Naval Academy.

In July 1924, he graduated from Navy School (52nd term).

In December 1925, he became an ensign in the Navy.

In December 1927, he was promoted to Lieutenant in the Navy.

In December 1930, he was again promoted to a captain, Navy Artillery School Higher Science Student.

In December 1931, he was assigned to the battleship Hyūga as their squad leader.

In November 1934, he became an Instructor of the Navy Artillery School.

In October 1935, he entered Naval War College.

In December 1936, he was promoted to a Major in the Navy.

On 31 July 1937, he graduated from Naval War College (35th term of class A) and was assigned to the light cruiser Yura as their gunnery chief. On 23 August, he became the deputy gun commander and squad commander of the battleship Haruna. On December 1, Deputy gun commander and squad commander of the battleship Mutsu.

In April 1939, Personnel Bureau, Ministry of the Navy, Section 1 Staff.

On 10 April 1941, he was put into the Third Fleet Staff. on October 15, he was promoted to Commander of the Navy.

On 10 April 1942, he was assigned to the Southwest Area Fleet Staff and Second Southern Expeditionary Fleet Staff. On May 5, Staff of the 2nd Fleet.

On 15 April 1943, he took the Military Command and Ministry of the Navy. In August, Ministry of the Navy Education Bureau Section 1 Staff.

On 15 October 1944, he was promoted to Colonel in the Navy, served at the Imperial Japanese Navy Technical Department and a member of the Education Bureau of the Ministry of the Navy.

On 24 April 1945, Ministry of the Navy Military Affairs Bureau seconded to Prime Minister's Secretary. On September 5, Military Command and Ministry of the Navy. On November 30, he transferred to reserve role.

On 28 November 1947, he received provisional designation for expulsion of public office.

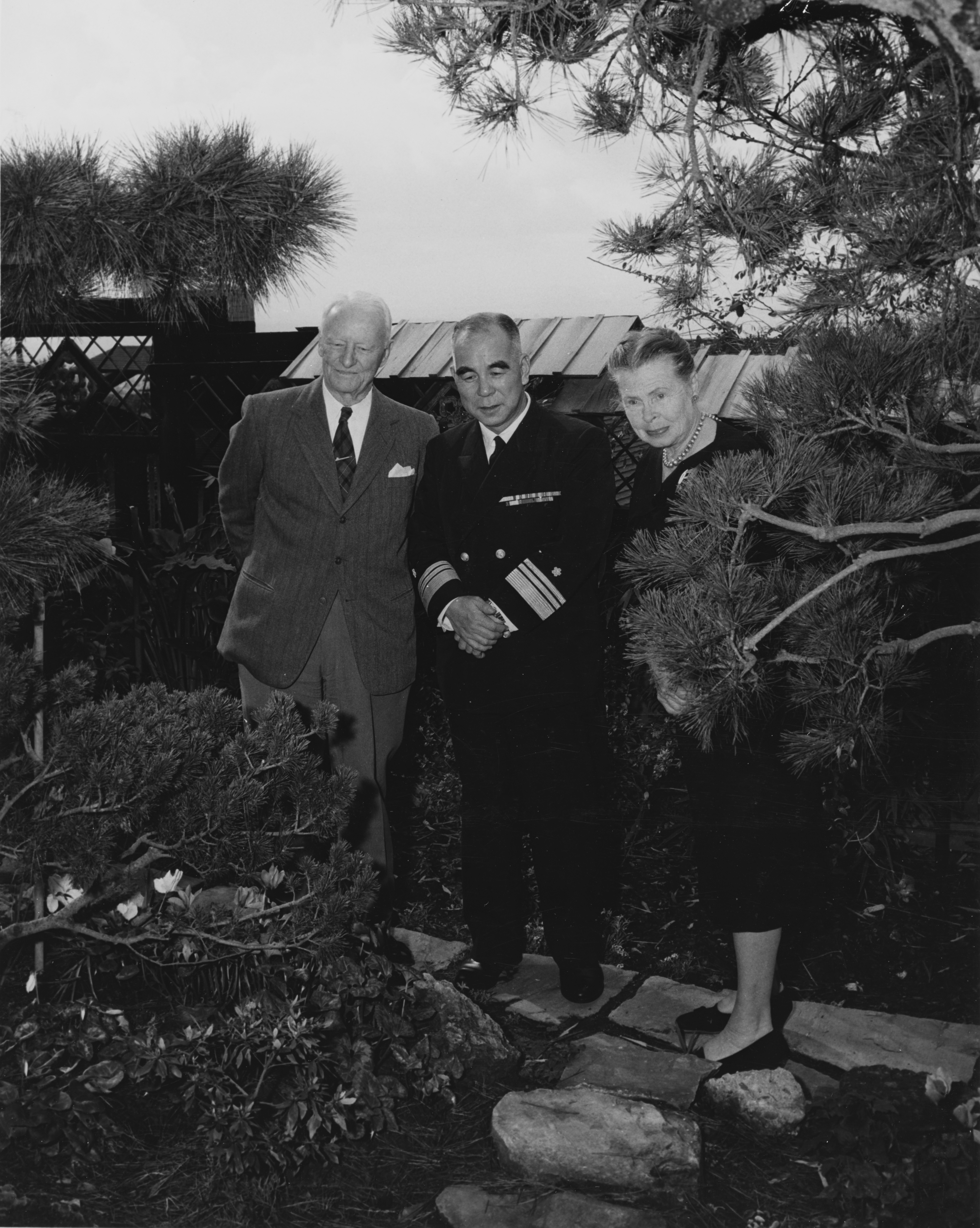
Fleet Admiral Chester Nimitz and his wife showing Mitsuga their Japanese home garden in Berkeley, California

On 26 January 1953, Appointed as 1st Class Security Officer, with Maizuru District General Manager and Maizuru Training Corps Commander. On July 8, With Yokosuka District General Manager. On August 16 she was promoted to Assistant Security Officer and appointed Commander of the Second Fleet Group.

On 3 August 1954, General Manager, General Affairs Department, Maritime Staff Office.

On 1 August 1956, he was promoted to Chief of Staff, appointed commander of the 3rd Self-Defense Fleet (also commander of the 1st Escort Group).

On 15 August 1958, he was appointed as the 3rd Chief of Staff, Maritime Self-Defense Force.

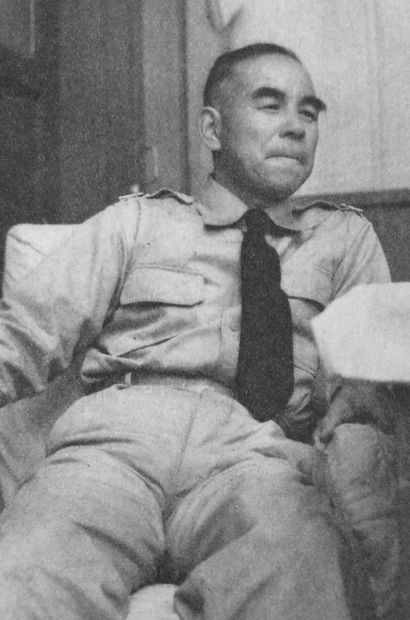
Mitsuga as JMSDF Chief of Staff in 1959

On 29 May 1961, US Government awarded him with the Legion of Merit. On 15 August, he retired from the Navy. After retiring, he served as the chairman of the Mizukokai Foundation (5th generation).

On 3 November 1973, he received the Order of the Sacred Treasure, Second Prize.

On 31 March 1979, he died at a hospital in Chiba City due to lung cancer at the age of 75 years old.

== Awards ==
- Order of the Sacred Treasure, Second Class - 3 November 1973
- Commander's Degree of the Legion of Merit - 29 May 1961

== See also ==
- Japanese military ranks
