= Yasumaro Kiguchi =

Japanese admiral

- 溪口 泰麿
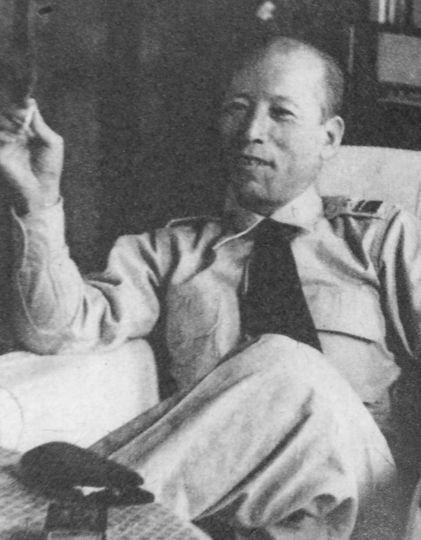
- Born: 10 March 1904; Hyōgo, Japan
- Died: 3 November 1992 (age 88); Tokyo, Japan
- Military career
- Allegiance: Japan
- Branch: Imperial Japanese Navy; Japan Coast Guard; Safety Security Force; Japan Maritime Self-Defense Force
- Service years: 1920–1945 (Imperial Japanese Navy); 1952–1954 (Safety Security Force); 1954–1960 (Japan Maritime Self-Defense Force)
- Rank: Captain
- Commands: Colonel of the Imperial Japanese Navy; Commander of Takao; Commander of the 1st Escort Group; Vice Admiral of the Self Defense Fleet
- Awards: See Awards

Vice Admiral Yasumaro Kiguchi (溪口泰麿, Yamaro Taniguchi; 10 March 1904 – 3 November 1992) was a Japanese naval officer who served as an officer of the Imperial Japanese Navy from 1920 to 1945 and became a Vice Admiral of the Japanese Maritime Self Defence Force (JMSDF), serving from 1954 to 1960. He was the second commander of the Self Defense Fleet succeeding Hidemi Yoshida. In 1956, he was succeeded by Mitsugu Ihara.

== Career ==
Kiguchi was born in Hyōgo Prefecture. He studied in the Toyōka Junior High School (currently Hyogo Prefectural Toyooka High School).

In August 1920, he entered the Imperial Japanese Naval Academy, from where he graduated in July 1923.

In December 1924, he became an ensign in the Navy.

In December 1926, he was promoted to Lieutenant in the Navy.

In December 1928, he was again promoted to Captain in the Navy.

In November 1929, he was graduated from Suirai Naval Academy High School and assigned to the destroyer Wakatake.

In December 1930, he was assigned to the heavy cruiser Furutaka as their squad leader.

In February 1932, he became the commander of the heavy cruiser Takao.

In December 1933, he entered Naval War College.

In November 1934, he was promoted to major in the Navy.

In October 1935, he graduated from Naval War College (33rd term of class A), and again assigned to the destroyer Wakatake as their captain.

In April 1937, Naval War College student, dispatched to the Faculty of Law, Tokyo Imperial University. In July 20, he was temporary transferred to the Imperial Japanese Navy General Staff and Ministry of the Navy.

On 10 August 1938, he served in the Imperial Japanese Navy General Staff and served by the Ministry of the Navy.

On 18 January 1939, he became the captain of the gunboat Futami. On August 24, he was assigned to the Military Command. On September 15, he became a resident in Germany. On November 15, he was promoted to the commander of the Navy.

On 1 May 1940, he became an assistant to the Military Attaché of the Imperial Embassy in Germany.

On 25 October 1943, he became the Imperial Japanese Navy Technical Department Arsenal Inspector.

On 1 May 1944, he was promoted to Colonel of the Navy.

On 31 March 1946, he was transferred to the reserve role, member of the personnel department of the Yokosuka Regional Demobilization Bureau.

On 4 June 1947, he was retired on request for demobilization clerk.

On 1 November 1951, he was appointed as Coast Guard Officer (Second Coast Guard Officer).

On 15 May 1952, he was appointed as a maritime guard and appointed as an assistant maritime security officer. Coastal Safety Force Yokosuka District Superintendent Deputy Director. On August 1, he was assigned to the Assistant Security Officer with the establishment of the Safety Security Force. Yokosuka Regional Superintendent Deputy General Manager Yokosuka Regional Superintendent.

On 1 April 1953, he was assigned to the second Yokosuka district general manager.

On 20 September 1954, he was promoted to Chief of Staff, Commander of the 2nd Self-Defense Fleet and Commander of the 1st Escort Group.

On 1 August 1956, he was transferred to the Maritime Self-Defense Force executive school chief.

On 16 March 1960, he was retired from the Navy.

On 29 April 1974, he received the Order of the Sacred Treasure, Second Prize.

On 3 November 1992, he died at a hospital in Tokyo due to heart failure. He was 88 at his time of death.

== Awards ==
Order of the Sacred Treasure

== See also ==
- Japanese military ranks
