= Keizō Hayashi =

Japanese civil servant and general officer

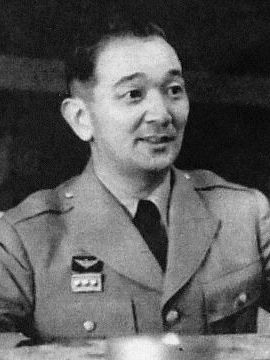
- General Hayashi as Chairman of the Joint Staff Council in 1954
- Native name: 林 敬三
- Born: 8 January 1907; Ishikawa, Japan
- Died: 12 November 1991 (aged 84) Tokyo, Japan
- Allegiance: Japan
- Branch: National Police Reserve; National Safety Force; Japan Ground Self-Defense Force
- Service years: 1950–1964
- Rank: General
- Awards: Grand Cordon of the Order of the Rising Sun (1st Class) (1987); Grand Cordon of the Order of the Sacred Treasure (1st Class) (1977); Legion of Merit (1958)

Governor of Tottori Prefecture
- In office 27 October 1945 – 4 February 1947
- Monarch: Hirohito
- Preceded by: Tsuneya Takahashi
- Succeeded by: Chūichi Yoshida

Keizō Hayashi (林 敬三, Hayashi Keizō; 8 January 1907 – 12 November 1991) was a Japanese civil servant, general officer and the first Chairman of Joint Staff Council (JSC), a post equivalent to Chief of the General Staff in other countries, from 1954 to 1964. He was instrumental in founding the post-war Japan Self-Defense Forces (JSDF) in 1954.

Hayashi began his civil service career in the Home Ministry in 1929. In post-war Japan, he became Governor of Tottori Prefecture from 1945 to 1947 and Director of the Bureau of Local Affairs from 1947 until the Home Ministry was disbanded in the same year. After that, he was appointed Vice-Minister of Imperial Household from 1948 to 1950, during which he became a confidant of Emperor Showa.

After the outbreak of the Korean War in 1950, Hayashi, who did not have prewar military background, was chosen by Prime Minister Shigeru Yoshida, with the endorsement of the American occupation authority, to head the newly formed National Police Reserve (NPR) in the capacity as Superintendent-General. Since Japan had been demilitarized after the Second World War, one of his major tasks was to build up the NPR as the foundation of Japan's self-defense power in post-war era. He was also responsible for developing a new mind-set for the NPR so as to adapt to post-war changes. When the NPR was restructured as the National Safety Force (NSF) in 1952, he was appointed Chief of the 1st (Ground) Staff of the First Staff Office, which was the top decision making body of the NSF.

Hayashi helped found the JSC and the JSDF after Japan regained its status as a sovereign state under the Treaty of San Francisco in 1954. As Chairman of JSC, he assisted the Director-General of Defense Agency (JDA) in formulating defense plans, reviewing proposals as submitted by the JSDF, carrying out defense-related intelligence and investigation work, as well as fostering closer military ties with the United States and its allies. Having served in the JSC for ten years, he was not only the longest-serving Chairman, but was also the only Chairman with civilian civil service background. In retirement, he took an active part in public affairs, serving as, among others, President of the Japan Housing Corporation from 1965 to 1971, of the Japanese Red Cross from 1978 to 1987, and of the Japan Good Deeds Association from 1983 to 1990.

== Early life and education ==
Keizō Hayashi was born on 8 January 1907 in Ishikawa Prefecture in the Chūbu region of Japan, with family's koseki registered in Tokyo Prefecture. He was the eldest son of Lieutenant-General Yasakichi Hayashi (1876–1948) of the Imperial Japanese Army and Teruko Hayashi (née Ishikawa). He had an older sister, Sakurako (born 1903), who was the wife of Kyoshiro Ando (1893–1982), former Governor of Kyoto Prefecture, and two younger sisters, Shigeko (born 1910) and Misako (born 1918). Instead of joining the army like his father, he studied law in Tokyo Imperial University. He passed the Higher Civil Service Examinations in 1928 and graduated from the law school of the University with a Bachelor of Arts degree the following year.

== Civil service career ==
Upon graduation, Hayashi entered the Home Ministry and was posted to the Toyama Prefectural Office as a junior civilian official in 1929. He was promoted to head of the Social Welfare Section of Kyoto Prefecture in 1932 and of Kanagawa Prefecture in 1935. After the outbreak of the Second World War in 1939, he was posted to the Cabinet Planning Board in March 1941 and he became chief of Section One under Division One of the Board in 1942. In 1943, he was additionally appointed staff officer of the Cabinet and of the Cabinet Legislation Bureau. At the later stage of the war, he held a number of offices in 1944 successively, including inspector of the Home Ministry, as well as head of the General Affairs Section and of the Administration Section under the Bureau of Local Affairs of the Home Ministry.

In 1945, Hayashi was appointed personal secretary to the Minister of Home Affairs as well as head of the Personnel Section of the Ministry. Shortly after the unconditional surrender of Japan to the Allied Powers in August 1945, he was chosen as Governor of Tottori Prefecture at the age of 38, assuming the office on 27 October, thus becoming the youngest local chief in the history of the Prefecture. However, his tenure was cut short in February 1947 when he became Director of the Bureau of Local Affairs. It was the last post he held in the Home Ministry, which was disbanded by the General Headquarters (GHQ) of the Allied Powers in December 1947. As a transitional arrangement decided in a Cabinet meeting, he was appointed Director of the temporarily established Office of Domestic Affairs in January 1948. The Office was in existence for around 90 days only, during which he was responsible for overseeing the law enforcement services formerly managed by the now-defunct Home Ministry, until the Office was replaced by the National Public Safety Commission.

While the Japanese constitution was being redrafted and the Japanese war criminals were under trial, there were a number of unusual senior staff changes in the Imperial Household Office (to be restructured as the Imperial Household Agency in 1949) between June and August 1948. In particular, two key imperial household officials in the early post-war period, Ōgane Masujirō, the Grand Chamberlain, and Susumu Katō, Vice-Minister of Imperial Household, relinquished their offices. In the reshuffle, Hayashi succeeded Katō on 2 August 1948. By the time when he left the post in 1950, he had become a confidant of Emperor Showa, making him one of the few people who had the privilege to see and talk to the Emperor.

== National Police Reserve ==
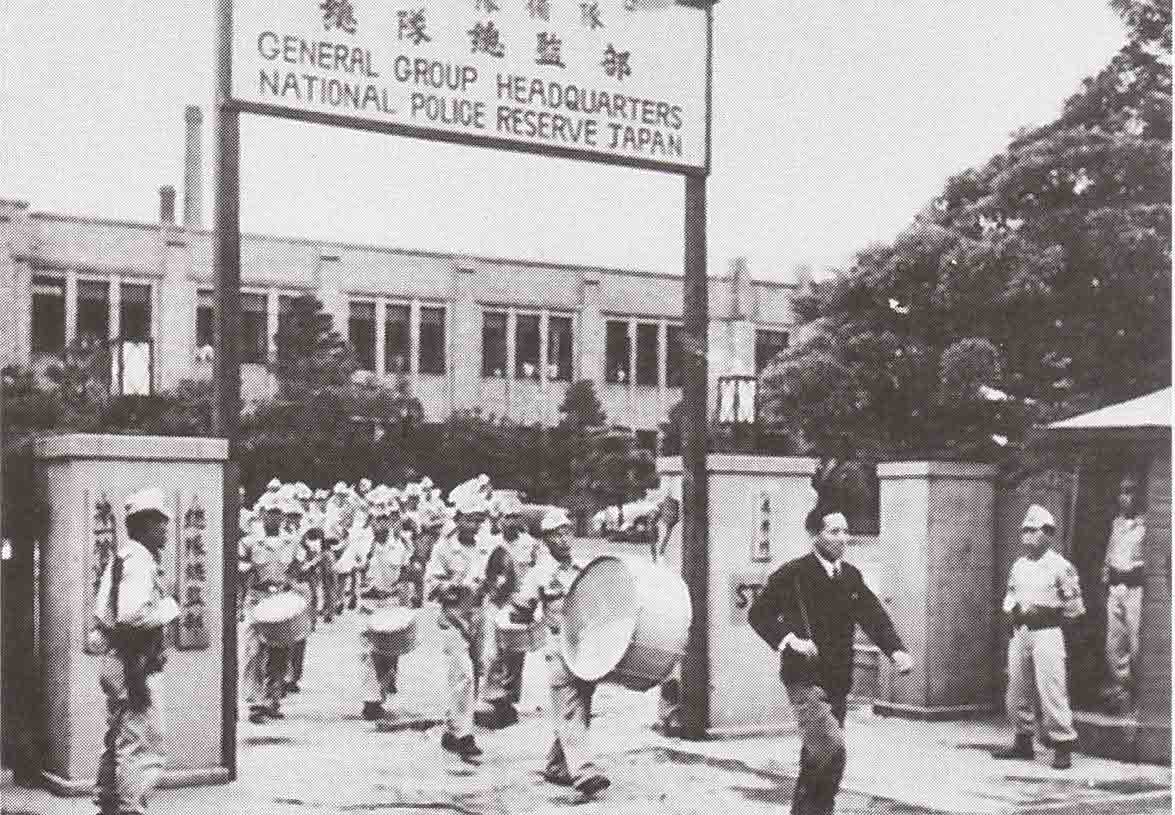
General Group Headquarters of the National Police Reserve in 1951.

After the outbreak of the Korean War in June 1950, there was a vacuum of defense in Japan as the United States (US) redeployed much of its troops from Japan to the Korean Peninsula. Against this background, the GHQ started to formulate plans to allow Japan rearm itself by setting up the National Police Reserve (NPR) as the foundation of post-war Japan's self-defense power. As a policy endorsed by the United Nations (UN) and the American occupation authority, the backbone of the NPR had to be formed by civilian officials and police officers from the ex-Home Ministry, while prewar Japanese military officials were barred from joining the NPR. Although the policy was supported by Prime Minister Shigeru Yoshida and Supreme Commander Douglas MacArthur, it was met with some opposition from within the GHQ. For example, Major-General Charles A. Willoughby, Chief of Intelligence (G-2) on General MacArthur's staff, attempted to recommend Takushiro Hattori, the former head of Operations Section of the Imperial Japanese Army General Staff Office, to command the NPR, a recommendation which was strongly opposed by Yoshida. Another prewar Japanese military officer, Eiichi Tatsumi, however, turned down the same offer even though he was a military adviser to Yoshida, who viewed him as an acceptable choice.

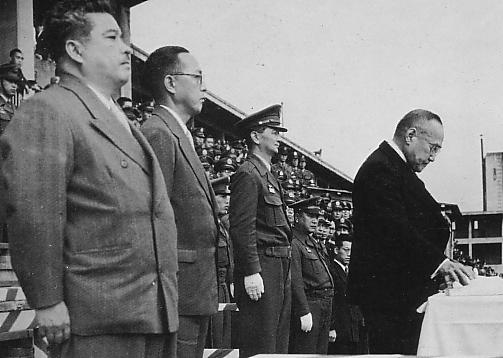
Prime Minister Shigeru Yoshida (right) and Hayashi (third from left) in the foundation ceremony of the National Safety Force in 1952.

In early September 1950, Yoshida nominated Hayashi to head the NPR with support from Emperor Hirohito, who not only had confidence in Hayashi, but also appreciated his performance as Vice-Minister of Imperial Household. This time the nomination of Hayashi was opposed by Willoughby and his intelligence staff, which was responsible for recruitment matters of NPR. They not only favored Hattori and other prewar Japanese army officers, but also even tried to prevent Hayashi from getting appointed. Nevertheless, their views were not shared by other parties within the GHQ. In particular, both Brigadier-General Courtney Whitney, Chief of the Government Section (GS), which was responsible for the NPR's personnel matters, and Major General Whitfield P. Shepard, Chief of the Civil Affairs Section Annex (CASA), which was responsible for the development and training of the NPR, favored Hayashi. Operations Section (G-3) of the GHQ, which dealt with military operations, law enforcement and repatriation, also showed their support to Hayashi. Because of Willoughby's opposition, the nomination of Hayashi dragged on for a month and it took a few more weeks before the nomination was approved only after the intervention of MacArthur and Yoshida.

On 9 October 1950, Hayashi was appointed to head the NPR. Formal appointment as Superintendent-General was made on 23 October. Later on 29 December, the headquarters of the NPR was restructured as the General Group Headquarters. Apart from him, some 160 key officials of the NPR were appointed. While most of the key posts, such as Deputy Superintendent-General and commanders of the Regional Units were filled by civilian officials and police officers from the ex-Home Ministry, the influence of those prewar army officers and other right-wing figures, who called Hayashi a "home affairs warlord" (as against the "Showa warlords"), was greatly diminished in the NPR and its successor, the National Safety Force (NSF, predecessor of the Japan Ground Self-Defense Force).

Hayashi's first task as the Superintendent-General was to lay down a new mind-set for the NPR, since the "spiritual training" (seishin kyoiku) in the prewar Imperial Japanese Army had been scrapped. As the post-war forces were no longer be required to pledge absolute allegiance to the Emperor under the post-war "Peace Constitution", the senior management of the NPR was deeply anxious about the lack of a new and appropriate mind-set. Hayashi attempted to explore one by striking a balance between old and new concepts. The new mind-set was finally introduced in a speech he made in March 1951, in which he emphasized, "The fundamental spirit of the NPR I firmly hold [is] patriotism and love of our race". He pointed out that the NPR was loyal to the country and the people, instead of the Emperor. In another speech to the officers of the NPR, he said, "Needless to say, if this organization is to play its rightful role in the new Japan, it must be 'an organization of the people.' This must be the fundamental principle upon which this defense force should be established" By formulating the new mind-set, he connected the new post-war defense force with the people and cut-off its lineage with the prewar Japanese armed forces.

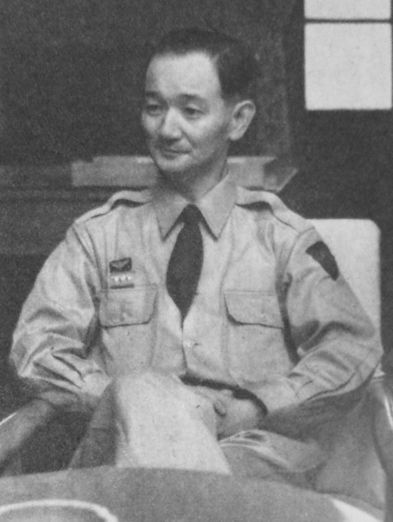
Hayashi as Chief of the 1st (Ground) Staff in 1953

On 28 April 1952, Japan regained its status as a sovereign state under the Treaty of San Francisco. One of the first agendas of Yoshida and his Cabinet was to establish the National Safety Agency (predecessor of the Defense Agency) to oversee both the NPR and the Coastal Safety Force (predecessor of the Japan Maritime Self-Defense Force). Hayashi and Keikichi Masuhara, Director-General of the NPR, supported the idea to put ground and maritime forces under the supervision of a unified body so as to avoid a recurrence of interservice rivalry during the Second World War. However, the Coastal Safety Force opposed the plan as they feared that they would be marginalized by the NPR, which was larger in scale. At last, Hayashi and Masuhara won the day and the National Safety Agency was formally established on 1 August.

To tie-in with the establishment of the National Safety Agency, the NPR was restructured as the NSF, with Hayashi becoming Chief of the 1st (Ground) Staff (later became known as Chief of Staff, Ground Self-Defense Force) to head the First Staff Office, which was the top decision making body of the NSF. In September 1952, he was appointed to a newly formed high-level planning committee in the capacity of Chief of the 1st Staff. Other members of the committee included Chief of the 2nd Staff (later became known as Chief of Staff, Maritime Self-Defense Force) and other senior officials of the National Safety Agency. The objective of the committee was to formulate long-term military planning for Japan. Besides, units and formations in NSF expanded considerably under the command of Hayashi. New units, such as the Northern Army, were formed, while the National Safety Academy and the NSF Aviation School were both founded in 1952.

== Chairman of Joint Staff Council ==
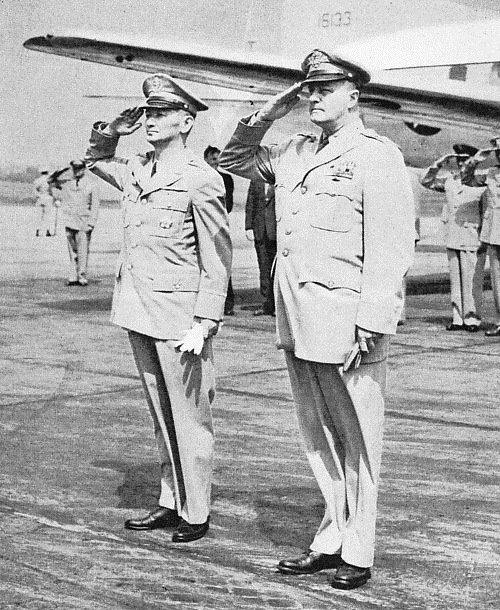
Keizō Hayashi (left) and Gen. Charles L. Bolte, Vice Chief of Staff of the United States Army (right), July 1954.

When the Defense Agency (JDA) and the Japan Self-Defense Forces (JSDF) were formed on 1 July 1954, the NSF and the Coastal Safety Force were restructured as the Japan Ground Self-Defense Force (JGSDF) and the Japan Maritime Self-Defense Force (JMSDF) respectively. The two Forces, together with the newly formed Japan Air Self-Defense Force (JASDF), were the three major components of the JSDF. The Joint Staff Council (JSC) was also formed on top of the three Forces, with Hayashi becoming Chairman of JSC with rank of General, which was equivalent to Chief of the General Staff in other countries. The JSC served under the Director-General of JDA and Hayashi was responsible for assisting in formulating overall defense plans, supplies plans and training plans, as well as coordinating related plans prepared by the Ground, Maritime and Air Staff Offices and operation directives as issued by the JSDF. Also, the JSC was responsible for defense-related intelligence and investigation work under his command.

As Chairman of JSC, Hayashi took part in defense collaboration and exchanges with other countries. Since the Defense Agency attached much importance to the research and development of missiles soon after the founding of JSDF, he met Major-General Gerald D. Higgins, the US Chief of Military Assistance Advisory Group in Japan (MAAG-J), in August 1954, to exchange views on the possibility of sending JSDF personnel to the US to study countermeasures against missile attack. In September 1954, he visited the US under invitation of the US Department of Defense. In Washington, D.C., he met Charles Erwin Wilson, US Secretary of Defense, and Admiral Arthur W. Radford, Chairman of the Joint Chiefs of Staff, among other top politicians and military officials. They held high-level strategic conferences, discussing issues on deployment of US troops to Japan and Korea, collective military actions, as well as the possibility of providing sufficient jet planes and destroyers to strengthen the power of the JSDF. When Japan and the US conducted their first joint military exercise at theater level in 1956, Hayashi was the chief official representing Japan, while his US counterpart was Lieutenant-General Arthur Trudeau, Deputy Chief of Staff for Plans and Operations, Far East and UN Command.

By the end of the 1950s, Japan had already become an important ally in the Western defense system as dominated by the US. To foster closer ties with other allies of the US, Hayashi paid several visits to some of these countries. In particular, he paid a visit to the United Kingdom (UK) under the invitation of the British government from 5 to 16 May 1957, during which he visited the British Armed Forces and their facilities in London and other places. It was the first formal visit of a senior Japanese general officer to the UK since 1937, when Lieutenant-General Masaharu Homma attended the coronation ceremony of King George VI. After visiting the UK, Hayashi arrived at Bonn, West Germany on 21 May 1957. On the following day, he met Franz Josef Strauss, Federal Minister of Defense, and Generalleutnant Adolf Heusinger, Inspector General of the Bundeswehr. It was the first post-war meeting between military chiefs of Japan and Germany and they achieved productive agreements on building a military exchange mechanism. On 14 and 15 November 1959, Hayashi attended a multinational military conference as hosted by Admiral Harry D. Felt, Commander of the US Pacific Command, at Baguio, the Philippines. During his stay, he met Lieutenant-General Manuel F. Cabal, Chief of Staff of the Philippines, General Peng Meng-chi, Chief of the General Staff of the Republic of China, as well as other military chiefs from member states of the Southeast Asia Treaty Organization with a view to fostering stronger military ties with countries in the Western Pacific Region.

Although Hayashi was the head of JSDF in the capacity of Chairman of JSC, he had limited powers to assume command in joint operations as the JSC itself was no more than a consultative body. It was not changed until 1961, when the functions of the JSC were modified and the Chairman was empowered to give orders to the JSDF when there was an operation. The Chairman was also given greater command authority in joint operations with greater powers to execute orders from the Director-General of JDA. Hayashi retired from the JSC in August 1964 after ten years of service. He was not only the longest-serving Chairman, but was also the only Chairman with civilian civil service background. All of his successors were career military officers and their tenure was confined to around one to three years only.

== Later years ==
After retiring from the JSC and the JSDF with rank of General in 1964, Hayashi took an active part in public affairs. He was President of the Japan Housing Corporation from 1 August 1965 to 31 March 1971 and President of the Japan Good Deeds Association from July 1983 to July 1990. For some years he was Chairman of the Board of Directors of Jichi Medical University. He was also closely associated with the Japanese Red Cross. He was appointed to the Board of Governors on 1 April 1977 and he became president from 1 April 1978 to 31 March 1987. Later on he became Honorary President.

Besides, Hayashi was appointed to public committees on a few occasions. On 16 March 1981, Prime Minister Zenkō Suzuki and his Cabinet set up the Second Provisional Council for the Promotion of Administrative Reform under the chairmanship of Toshiwo Doko with a view to reforming the financial system and moving forward administrative reform. Hayashi was appointed to the Council in the capacity of President of the Japanese Red Cross alongside other prominent community leaders. They subsequently submitted a reform report to the Prime Minister. On 3 August 1984, he was invited by Takao Fujinami, Chief Cabinet Secretary under Prime Minister Yasuhiro Nakasone, to chair a private advisory body on controversies surrounding "official visits by Cabinet ministers to Yasukuni Shrine". In that capacity, he examined the controversies from legal, social and religion aspects with 14 other members as appointed to the private advisory body from the legal, literature and religion circles.

Hayashi died in a hospital in Shibuya, Tokyo on 12 November 1991, aged 84. His funeral was held at Zōjō-ji in Shiba Park, Tokyo. He was conferred Senior Third Rank posthumously.

== Honors ==
In recognition of his public services to Japan, Hayashi was bestowed the Grand Cordon of the Order of the Sacred Treasure (1st Class) by the Japanese government on 29 April 1977, thus becoming the first recipient with JSDF background. On 3 November 1987, he was further bestowed the Grand Cordon of the Order of the Rising Sun (1st Class).

Besides, when he was Chairman of JSC, he became the first Japanese to be awarded Legion of Merit by the US on 10 November 1958. The honor was presented to him by Douglas MacArthur II, US Ambassador to Japan, at the Embassy of the US in Tokyo.

== Personal life ==
Hayashi's wife, Shizue, was born in January 1912. She was the fifth daughter of Hyoji Futagami (1878–1945), Chief Secretary of the Privy Council of Japan. The couple had one son and one daughter. Their son, Masaharu, born in 1935, graduated from the University of Tokyo with a major in Economics, and he worked in Sumitomo Metal Industries. Their daughter, Mineko, was born in 1942.

Hayashi's hobbies included traveling and reading. He wrote a number of books in Japanese, such as Japan's Defense Problems from International Perspectives (1962), A Guide for the Heart (1960) as included in the "Self-Defense Forces Education Series", Speeches on Local Self-Governance (1949) and Local Self-Governance: Review and Prospect (1976), etc.

== See also ==
- Occupation of Japan
- Civilian control of the military
- Japan Ground Self-Defense Force
- Home Ministry

== Footnotes ==
Government offices
Preceded by Tsuneya Takahashi	Governor of Tottori Prefecture; 27 October 1945 – 4 February 1947	Succeeded by Chuichi Yoshida
Preceded by Susumu Katō	Vice-Minister of Imperial Household; 2 August 1948 – 9 October 1950	Succeeded by Takeshi Usami
Military offices
Preceded by New Creation	Superintendent-General of the National Police Reserve; 29 December 1950 – 31 July 1952	Succeeded by Chief of the 1st (Ground) Staff
Preceded by Superintendent-General of the National Police Reserve	Chief of the 1st (Ground) Staff; 1 August 1952 – 30 June 1954	Succeeded by Takeo Tsutsui (as Chief of Staff, Ground Self-Defense Force)
Preceded by New creation	Chairman of the Joint Staff Council; 1 July 1954 – 14 August 1964	Succeeded by Ichizo Sugie
Non-profit organization positions
Preceded by Ryotaro Azuma	President of the Japanese Red Cross; 1 April 1978 – 31 March 1987	Succeeded by Masayoshi Yamamoto
Preceded by Ryotaro Azuma	President of the Japan Good Deeds Association; July 1983 – July 1990	Succeeded by Shunichi Suzuki
