= Kogoro Yamazaki =

Japanese admiral (1905-1976

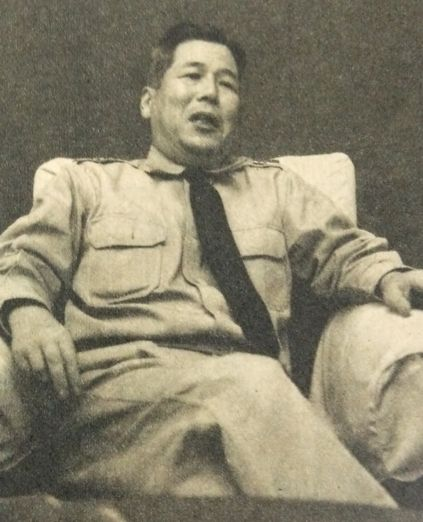
- Born: 10 November 1905; Fukuoka Prefecture
- Died: 2 August 1976 (age 70); Tokyo
- Military career
- Allegiance: Japan
- Branch: Japan Coast Guard; Coastal Safety Force; Safety Security Force; Japan Maritime Self-Defense Force
- Service years: 1952-1954
- Rank: Vice Admiral
- Commands: Ministry of Communications; Vice Minister for Ministry of Transport; Deputy Director of the Japan Coast Guard; Chief of Staff, Maritime Affairs
- Awards: See Awards

Vice Admiral Kogoro Yamazaki (山崎小五郎, Yamazaki Kogoro; born 10 November 1905) was a Japanese Maritime Self-Defense Force officer, a former Ministry of Communications and a bureaucrat of the Ministry of Transport. The 24th Vice-Minister of Transportation, Deputy Director of the Japan Coast Guard, and the first Chief of Staff, Maritime Self Defense Force until 1954 when he was succeeded by Ko Nagasawa.

As a member of the Y Committee, he contributed to the establishment of the Maritime Self-Defense Force, concluded a Japan-US ship loan agreement based on the MSA agreement, and started domestic production of escort vessels. After completing the bridge from the Coast Guard to Navy, he returned to the Ministry of Transport and became the top office worker.

== Career ==
Born in Fukuoka prefecture. Born as the fifth son of Ryotaro Yamazaki. After finishing Fukuoka Prefectural Tochiku Middle School (now Fukuoka Prefectural Tochiku High School) and Seventh Higher School Zoshikan (now Kagoshima University), he graduated from the Department of Law, Faculty of Law, Tokyo Imperial University in March 1931. Passed the Higher Examination Judicial Examination in December 1929 and the Higher Examination Administrative Examination in October 1930.

In March 1931, he graduated from Tokyo Imperial University and April of the same year, he joined the Ministry of Communications.

On 25 June 1947, Deputy General Manager of Illegal Immigration Ship Monitoring Headquarters.

On 25 May 1949, he was appointed as Prime Minister's Secretary. A member of the Headquarters for Economic Stability, working at the Wheeling Bureau of the Headquarters for Economic Stability. On June 1, he worked at the Construction and Transportation Bureau. On July 1, Deputy Director of Construction and Transportation Bureau.

On 18 May 1951, he was appointed Deputy Director of the Japan Coast Guard.

On 26 April 1952, the Maritime Guard was established, appointed as a Maritime Guard, and was appointed as the Chief of the Maritime Guard after being deceived by the Maritime Guard. On August 1, the National Safety Agency Coastal Security Force was established and became the 2nd Chief of Staff.

On 1 July 1954, he became the first Chief of Staff, Maritime Self-Defense Force. On August 3, he retired from the Chief of Staff, Maritime Staff, seconded from the Defense Agency to the Ministry of Transport. Inaugurated as the 24th Vice-Minister of Transport.

On 14 February 1956, he resigned as Vice-Minister of Transport and in July, he became a candidate for the House of Councilors election officially recognized by the Liberal Democratic Party from Fukuoka Prefecture, but failed.

On 2 August 1976, he died at a hospital in Tokyo due to heart failure at the age of 70. The fourth rank and the Order of the Sacred Treasure, Second Prize, were awarded.

== Awards ==
Order of the Sacred Treasure

== See also ==
- Japanese military ranks
