= Hidemi Yoshida =

Japanese admiral (1902–1978)

- 吉田英三
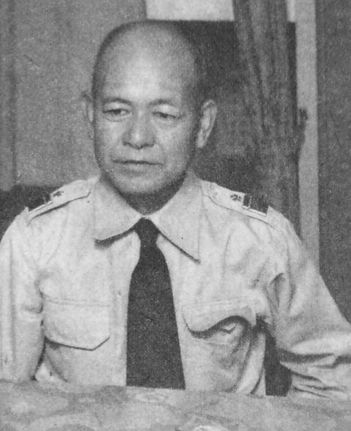
- Yoshida in 1953
- Born: 5 March 1902; Fukushima, Japan
- Died: 24 April 1978 (aged 76); Tokyo, Japan
- Military career
- Allegiance: Japan
- Branch: Imperial Japanese Navy; Japan Coast Guard; Safety Security Force; Japan Maritime Self-Defense Force
- Service years: 1919–1945 (Imperial Japanese Navy); 1952–1954 (Safety Security Force); 1954–1958 (Japan Maritime Self-Defense Force)
- Rank: Captain (IJN); Vice Admiral (JMSDF)
- Commands: Destroyer Mutsuki; 1st Fleet Group; 3rd Fleet Group; Self Defense Fleet
- Awards: See Awards

Vice Admiral Hidemi Yoshida (吉田英三, Eizo; 5 March 1902 – 24 April 1978) was a Japanese naval officer who served in the Imperial Japanese Navy from 1919 to 1945 and the Japanese Maritime Self Defense Force (JMSDF) from 1954 to 1958. He was the first Self Defense Fleet commander in 1954 until being succeeded by Vice Admiral Yasumaro Kiguchi.

== Career ==
Born as the third son of Kuranosuke Yoshida, a farmer, Yoshida graduated from Iwaki Junior High School (currently Fukushima Prefectural Iwaki High School), and in August 1919, he entered the Imperial Japanese Naval Academy, graduating in June 1922.

In September 1923, he became an ensign in the Navy. In December 1925, he was promoted to Lieutenant, and in December 1927, he was again promoted to a captain in the Navy.

In December 1928, he graduated from Suirai Naval Academy High School.

He became a resident in Germany from April 1929 until April 1931.

In May 1931, he was appointed as a mine chief of the destroyer Minekaze. In November, he was then transferred to the torpedo chef role aboard destroyer Asagiri.

In November 1933, he became a major in the Navy.

In July 1934, he graduated from Naval War College (32nd term of class A) and in November, he was assigned to the light cruiser Jintsū as their mine chief.

In October 1935, he was assigned to the destroyer Mutsuki as a captain.

In November 1936, he was appointed as a staff of 1st Destroyer Squadron.

In December 1937, he became a member of the 7th Division, 3rd Division, Imperial Japanese Navy General Staff.

On 15 November 1938, he became the commander of the Navy.

On 15 November 1939, he was appointed as a staff of the 2nd Destroyer Squadron.

On 15 August 1941, Military General Staff and Ministry of the Navy. On 10 October, he became a member of the Military Affairs Bureau, Ministry of the Navy and Member of the Navy Technical Council.

On 1 May 1943, he was promoted to a colonel in the Navy, a member of the Imperial Japanese Navy Technical Department and a member of the Military Affairs Bureau of the Ministry of the Navy. On 10 July, he became a member of the Military Affairs Bureau of the Ministry of the Navy and Member of the Navy Technical Council.

On 1 April 1944, he became a member of the Imperial Japanese Navy General Staff, Chief of Staff of the Imperial Japanese Navy. On 1 August, exemption and member of the Imperial Japanese Navy General Staff.

On 25 February 1945, with the 1st Division of the Military Affairs Bureau 15 April, Special Soldier and Ministry of the Navy Military Affairs Bureau. 285 June, Military Command and Ministry of the Navy. 10 July, Director, Military Affairs Bureau, Ministry of the Navy, Member of the Imperial Japanese Navy General Staff, Member of the Imperial Japanese Navy General Staff, Member of the Imperial Japanese Navy Staff, Navy General Staff. 30 November, he was transferred to reserve role. 1 December, Second Ministry of Rehabilitation, General Affairs Bureau, Staff.

The former Ministry of the Navy was dissolved at the end of the war, but because he was familiar with the personnel information necessary for demobilization, he was exceptionally exempt from public office expulsion by GHQ and continued to work at the 2nd Demobilization Bureau. From around this time, he planned a new navy reconstruction plan during off-hours, using the information and personal connections he had been in contact with during his duties.

He presented the draft of this new navy to the Japanese government, but he was not dealt with, and immediately after the Korean War, he and Yoshisaburo Nomura worked on the draft to the US government and got a good impression.

After that, he became a major member of the Maritime Self-Defense Force (commonly known as "Y Committee"). After serving as the Chief of the Yokosuka District Superintendent of the Japan Coast Guard (currently the Yokosuka District Chief), he served as Commander of the 1st Fleet Group and Commander of the Self Defense Fleet.

When he was appointed as a reference for the Third Committee on the Practice of Constitutional Operation of the Cabinet Constitutional Investigation Committee, he said, "From the experience of the former commander of the Self-Defense Fleet, to make the Self-Defense Forces a strong unit. It is best to somehow make the emperor, who is a symbol of the nation, the commander-in-chief".

On 27 May 1947, Demobilization Agency 2nd Demobilization Bureau Material Arrangement Manager.

On 1 January 1948, Demobilization Bureau 2nd Demobilization Bureau Remaining Affairs Department Material Section Chief.

On 15 May 1952, he was appointed as a maritime guard and appointed as an assistant maritime security officer. Appointed as Yokosuka Regional Superintendent. On 1 August, with the establishment of the Safety Security Force, the class name was changed to Assistant Security Officer. Yokosuka Regional Supervisor Renewed First Yokosuka Regional Supervisor.

In April 1953, he was appointed the commander of the 1st Fleet Group (currently the 1st Escort Group) and Commander of the 3rd Fleet Group.

On 1 July 1954, he was appointed the Chief of Staff, Commander of the 1st Escort Group, also commander of the 1st Self-Defense Fleet. September 20, 3rd Yokosuka District Chief (reappointment).

On 1 June 1958, he was appointed the commander of the training corps. On 19 December later that year, he was retired.

On 29 April 1972, Received the Order of the Sacred Treasure, Second Prize.

On 24 April 1978, he died at home in Tokyo due to cardiac weakness due to chronic bronchitis at the age of 76).

== Awards ==
Order of the Sacred Treasure

== See also ==
- Japanese military ranks
