= Hidemi =

- Gender: Male

Origin
- Origin: Japanese
- Meaning: Different meanings depending on the kanji used

Hidemi (written: 日出海, 秀美 or 英美) is a masculine Japanese given name. Notable people with the name include:

- Hidemi Miyashita (地主園 秀美; born 1957), Japanese weightlifter
- Hidemi Jinushizono (地主園 秀美; born 1989), Japanese footballer
- Hidemi Kon (今 日出海; 1903–1984), Japanese writer
- Hidemi Yoshida (吉田 英三; 1902–1978), Japanese naval officer
- Hidemi Suzuki (鈴木 秀美; 1957), Japanese cellist and conductor
