= Zenshiro Hoshina =

Japanese admiral (1891–1991)

- 保科 善四郎
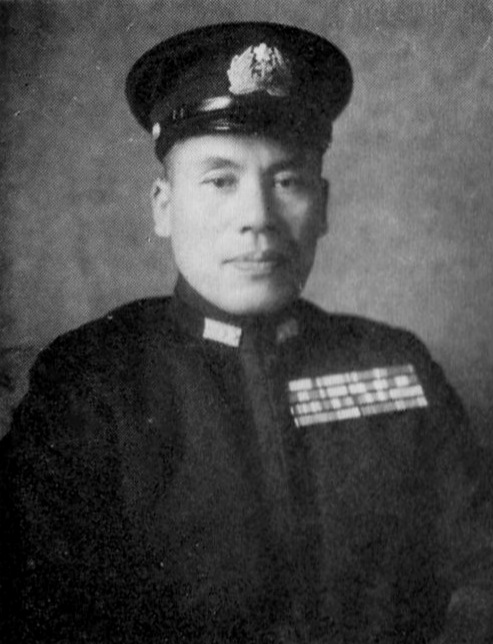
- Born: 8 March 1891; Kakuda, Miyagi, Japan
- Died: 25 December 1991 (aged 100)
- Military career
- Allegiance: Empire of Japan
- Branch: Imperial Japanese Navy
- Service years: 1913–1945
- Rank: Vice admiral

Zenshiro Hoshina (保科 善四郎, Hoshina Zenshiro; 8 March 1891 – 25 December 1991) was a Japanese naval officer and politician. The final rank is Vice Admiral of the Navy. After serving as a member of the House of Representatives for four terms, he became chairman of the Japan Defense Association.

== Early life ==
Born in Kitago Village, Igu District, Miyagi Prefecture (currently Kakuda City). On 1 April 1903, he enrolled in Kakuda Junior High School, Miyagi Prefecture. On 31 March 1908, he graduated from Kakuda Junior High School, Miyagi Prefecture.

== Career ==
=== 1910s ===
On 12 September 1910, he enrolled in the Imperial Japanese Naval Academy (41st term). The seating order is 40 out of 120 at the time of admission and 28 out of 118 at the time of graduation.

On 19 December 1913, he graduated from Naval Academy, Ensign Candidate and assigned to the armored cruiser Azuma.

On 14 April 1914, he was assigned to the battleship Aki. On 21 August, he was again transferred to the cruiser Ibuki On December 1, he was attached to the Second Southern Expeditionary Fleet Command and on December 28, he was assigned to the battleship Fuji.

He became a navigator for the armored cruiser Azuma on 30 June 1915.

On 1 September 1916, he was assigned to the battleship Kongō and on December 1, he was promoted to a Lieutenant at the Suirai Naval Academy.

On 1 December 1917, he was assigned to the cruiser Chitose.

On 24 July 1918, he was assigned to the destroyer Yamakaze.

=== 1920 ===
On 1 December 1920, he was transferred to the battleship Kirishima.

He became a Navy Ensign Candidate Instructor aboard the armored cruiser Izumo on 5 May 1921.

On 15 April 1922, he was assigned to the destroyer Yanagi. On December, he was transferred to the destroyer Nadakaze as their gunner and squad leader.

On 25 November 1925, he graduated from Naval War College Class A, 2nd out of 22 graduation grades. On December 1, he became a lieutenant commander of the Navy, Deputy Commander and Squad Commander of battleship Yamashiro.

=== 1930 ===
He was stationed in the United States from May 1930 to November 1932, but he has the theory that it is the first decision to investigate the person of the United States Navy by ringing as the only American connoisseur of the Navy. After learning that the US Navy was investigating the characters of the Japanese Navy, Hoshina advised Rear Admiral Shigetaro Shimada, the third group leader of the Imperial Japanese Navy General Staff, that he had to make a personnel examination table for the US Navy. It was not accepted, but later transferred to Shanghai as a senior staff member of the Third Fleet, where he later met Mitsumasa Yonai, who was greatly influenced. Hoshina didn't know anything about U.S.A. and had never even heard of his name.

On 25 April 1938, he became the captain of the heavy cruiser Myōkō and in 15 November, he too became the captain of the heavy cruiser Chōkai.

On 1 November 1939, he was assigned to the battleship Mutsu as their captain.

=== 1940 ===
On May 27, 1945, General Manager of the Imperial Japanese Navy General Staff. On September 1, Director, Military Affairs Bureau, Ministry of the Navy, General Manager of Transport Headquarters, and General Manager of Imperial Headquarters Force Supply Department. On November 17, Ministry of the Navy. On November 30, he was put into the reserve role transferred due to the abolition of the Ministry of the Navy, convened on the same day. On December 1, 2nd Ministry of Demobilization.

At the end of the war, he was in the position of Director of the Military Affairs Bureau under the U.S. Minister and Under Secretary Takeo Tada. We should seek to rebuild the Navy based on the standards. Many talented people have gathered in the Navy and have inherited that tradition. We should tell posterity how our seniors have built that tradition. Technology possessed by the Navy Is entrusted to help the reconstruction of Japan. Hoshina stated that he entered the postwar politics in order to achieve even one "will" in the United States, and said that he reflected that "will" when establishing the current Maritime Self-Defense Force through the Y Committee. It has been. He also asked Eiji Yoshikawa, a Navy correspondent, to write the history of the Navy.

It is said that everyday words had a considerable Tohoku accent. Hoshina was the guide for Mr. Sugita, who got a job in the Navy as an international legal adviser, on the first day when he served in the Ministry of the Navy. Said with a Tohoku accent. Inoue Shigeyoshi, who is from his hometown, said he was deliberately talking about complaints in the local dialect, and Shinzo Onishi, who was listening to the conversation between the two, recalled, "I had no idea what I was talking about."

=== 1950s-1990s ===
On 11 July 1952, he became the Chairman of the Sea and Sky Technology Study Group.

On 27 February 1955, the 27th general election was run from the former Miyagi 1st district with the official approval of the Democratic Party of Japan and won the top prize. On November 15, conservatively joins the Liberal Democratic Party.

On 15 March 1970, President of Japan Defense Association.

On 25 December 1991, he died at the age of 100.

== See also ==
- Japanese military ranks
