= National Police Reserve =

Former national police force in Japan

National Police Reserve (NPR)
- 警察予備隊
- NPR insignia
- Active: 10 August 1950–1 July 1954
- Country: Japan
- Type: Gendarmerie
- Role: Anti-tank warfare Border control Cold-weather warfare Counterinsurgency; Counterintelligence; Crowd control Internal security Law enforcement
- Size: c. 75,000 – 110,000
- Part of: National Safety Agency, Prime Minister's Office
- Garrison/HQ: Camp Etchūjima, Kōtō, Tokyo

Commanders
- Notable commanders: Senior Superintendent Keizō Hayashi

Insignia
- Flag

The National Police Reserve (警察予備隊, Keisatsu Yobitai), or NPR, was a lightly armed national police force established in August 1950 during the Allied occupation of Japan. In October 1952, it was expanded to 110,000 men and renamed as the National Safety Force (保安隊, Hoantai). On July 1, 1954, it was reorganized as the Japan Ground Self-Defense Force (JGSDF).

== History ==
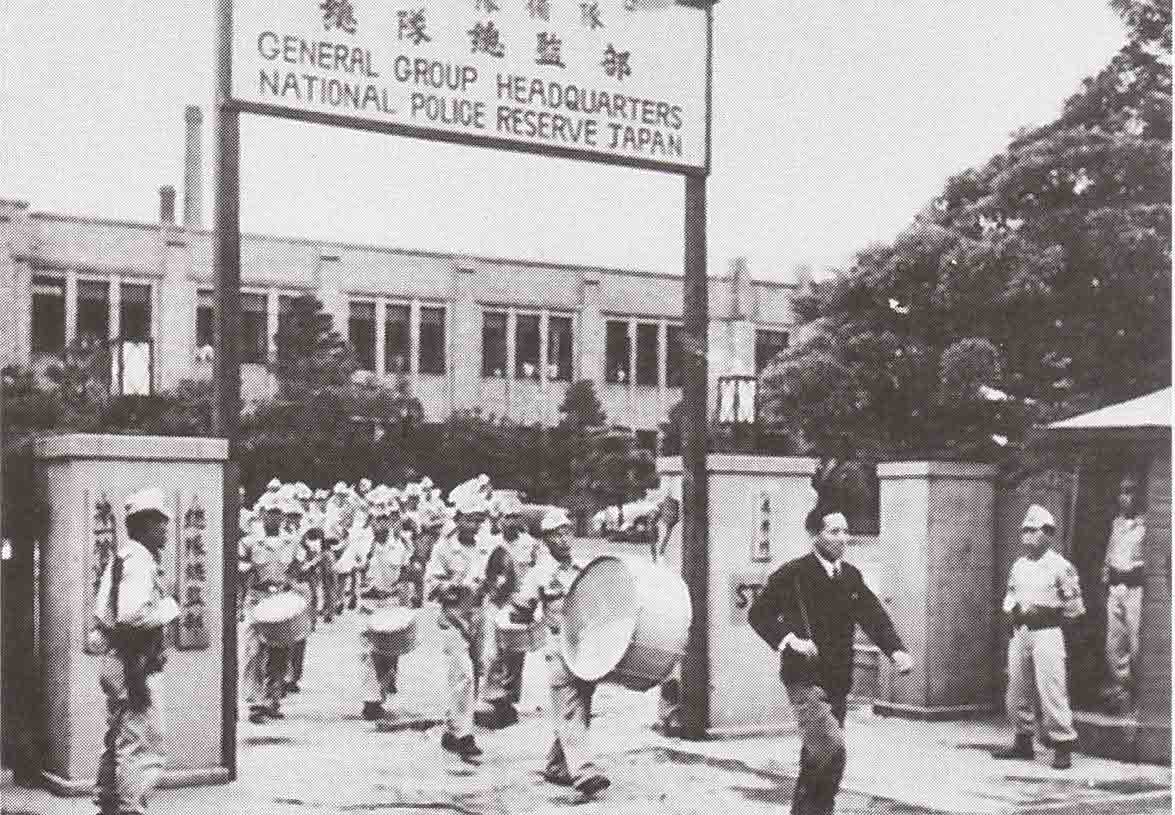
General Group Headquarters of the NPR

On the outbreak of the Korean War, many units of the United States Armed Forces stationed in Japan were transferred to South Korea for combat, and Japan was perceived as lacking defenses. Encouraged by the Supreme Commander for the Allied Powers (GHQ), the Japanese government in 1950 authorized the establishment of NPR, consisting of 75,000 men equipped with light infantry weapons. Personnel affairs of the NPR was taken charge of by GHQ's Government Section (GS) under Brigadier General Courtney Whitney while the efforts to establish and train the force was made by Civil Affairs Section Annex (CASA) under Major General Whitfield P. Shepard.

Given the legal status of police, the National Police Reserve was tasked with the duty to maintain public security under special conditions according to the National Police Reserve Order (Cabinet Order No. 260, 1950), (Note: According to Article 3, National Police Reserve Order (警察予備隊令第三條), the NPR took action upon appointment by the Prime Minister when it was particularly necessary to maintain public security. (original text in Japanese: 警察予備隊は、治安維持のため特別の必要がある場合において、内閣総理大臣の命を受け行動するものとする。)) while in terms of unit formation and equipment, it was a de facto military force modeled after the United States Army.

In October 1952, the NPR was expanded to 110,000 men and renamed as the National Safety Force (NSF).

On July 1, 1954, after the 1954 Self-Defense Forces Act [Act No. 165 of 1954] the National Security Board was reorganized as the Defense Agency, and the National Security Force was reorganized as the Japan Ground Self-Defense Force (postwar army branch of Japan), while the Coastal Safety Force (waterborne counterpart of the NPR) was reorganized as the Japan Maritime Self-Defense Force (postwar naval branch of Japan).

== Ranks ==
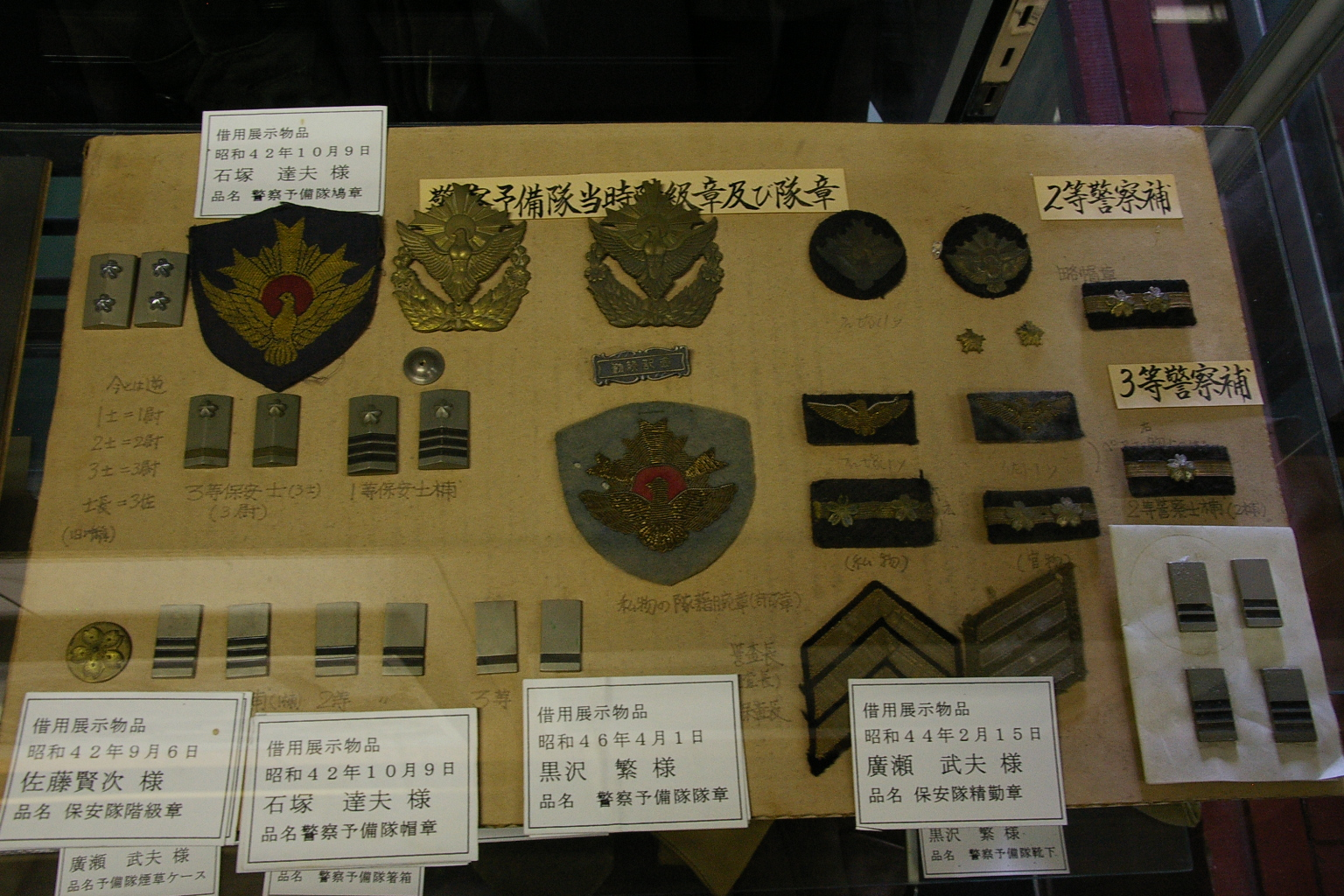
Rank insignia of the NPR

NPR Regional Units (管区隊, reorganized as JGSDF divisions in 1962)

Ranks of the National Police Reserve
	NPR ranks			equivalent ranks		
	in Japanese	Rank insignia	English translations	National Safety Force ranks	NSF rank insignia	Army/JGSDF ranks
Officers	Sōtaisōkan-taru-keisatukan (総隊総監たる警察監)		Senior Superintendent (serving as Superintendent General of the National Police Reserve)	Di-ichibakuryōchō-taru-hoankan (第一幕僚長たる保安監)		Lieutenant General
Officers	Keisatsukan (警察監)		Senior Superintendent	Hoankan (保安監)		Lieutenant General
Officers	Keisatsukanho (警察監補)		Assistant Senior Superintendent	Hoankanho (保安監補)		Major General
Officers	Ittō keisatsusei (1等警察正)		Superintendent First Class	Ittō hoansei (1等保安正)		Colonel
Officers	Nitō keisatsusei (2等警察正)		Superintendent Second Class	Nitō hoansei (2等保安正)		Lieutenant Colonel
Officers	Keisatsushicyō (警察士長)		Senior Inspector	Santō hoansei (3等保安正)		Major
Officers	Ittō Keisatsushi (1等警察士)		Inspector First Class	Ittō hoanshi (1等保安士)		Captain
Officers	Nitō Keisatsushi (2等警察士)		Inspector Second Class	Nitō hoanshi (2等保安士)		First lieutenant
Officers	-	-	-	Santō hoanshi (3等保安士)		Second lieutenant
Sub-officers	Ittō Keisatsushiho (1等警察士補)		Assistant Inspector First Class	Ittō hoanshiho (1等保安士補)		Master Sergeant
Sub-officers	Nitō Keisatsushiho (2等警察士補)		Assistant Inspector Second Class	Nitō hoanshiho (2等保安士補)		Sergeant First Class
Sub-officers	Santō Keisatsushiho (3等警察士補)		Assistant Inspector Third Class	Santō hoanshiho (3等保安士補)		Sergeant
Patrolmen	Keisachō (警査長)		Senior Patrolman	Hosachō (保査長)		Leading Private
Patrolmen	Ittō Keisa (1等警査)		Patrolman First Class	Ittō hosa (1等保査)		Private First Class
Patrolmen	Nitō Keisa (2等警査)		Patrolman Second Class	Nitō hosa (2等保査)		Private

== Photos ==
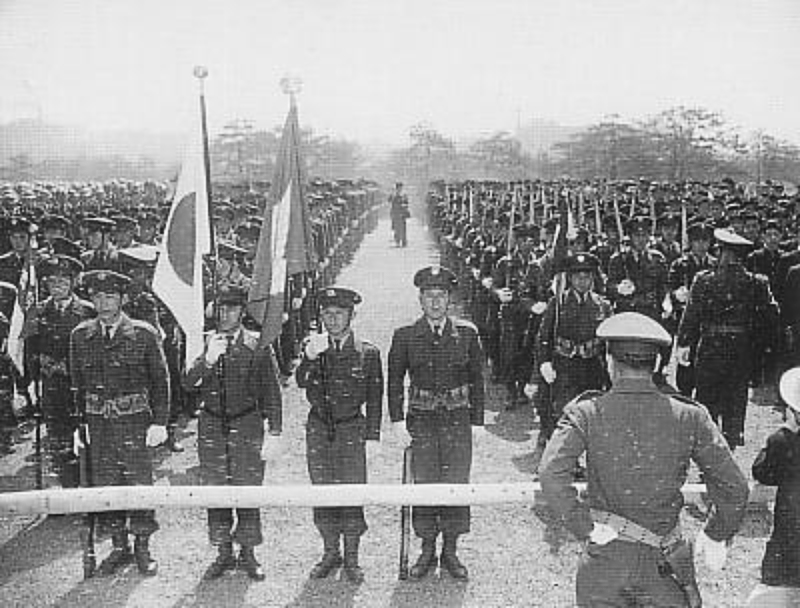
National Police Reserve Corps, (Showa 27) May 3, 1952

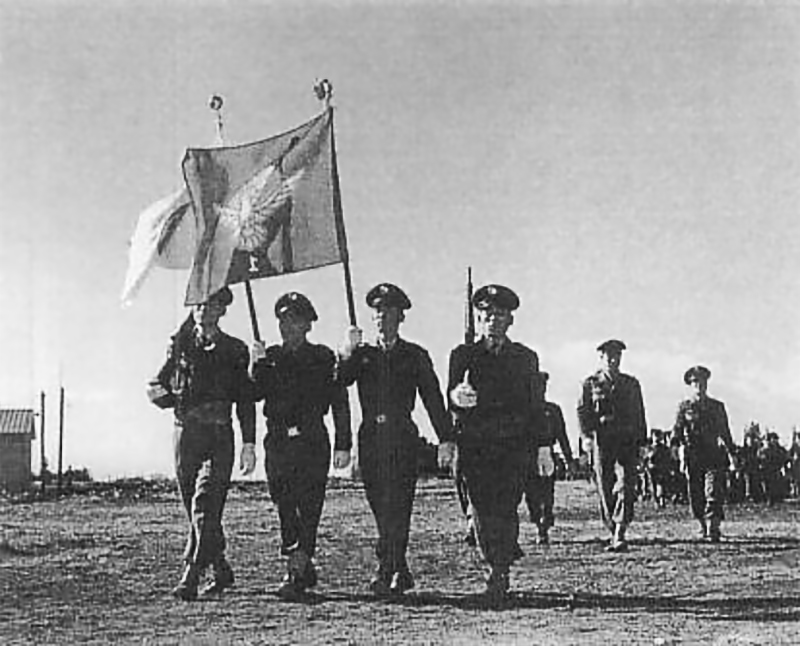
Police Reserve Corps 1st Regiment

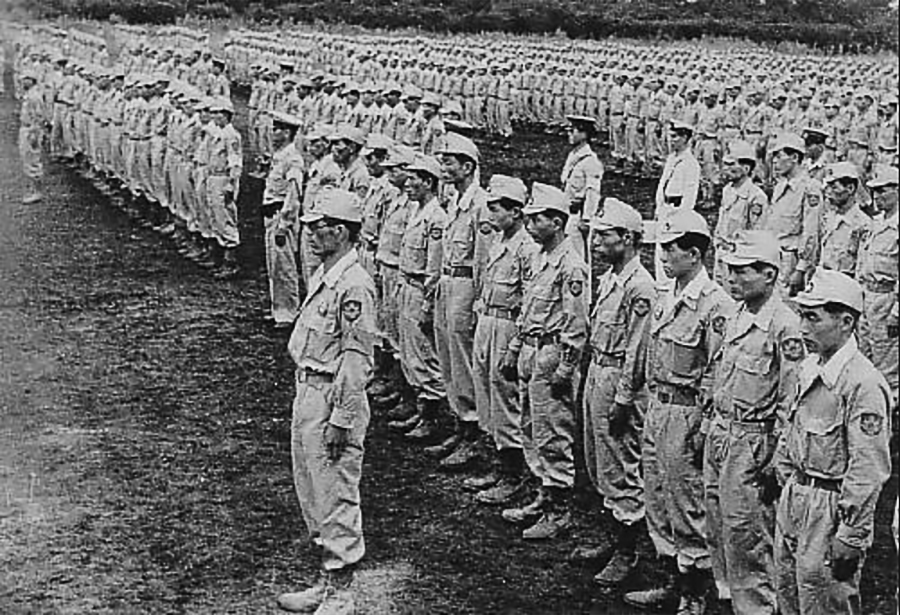
A police officer of a police reserve party who will face the first morning assembly after commissioning

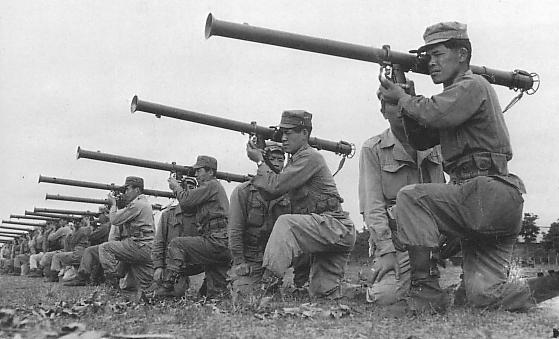
NPR bazooka training

== See also ==
- Japan Ground Self-Defense Force
- Reverse Course
- Bundesgrenzschutz
- Kasernierte Volkspolizei
  - Grenztruppen
- B-Gendarmerie

== Notes and references ==
Notes
