= National Safety Agency =

Former Japanese administrative agency of Japan's National Security

- 保安庁; Hoanchō

Agency overview
- Formed: August 1, 1952
- Dissolved: June 30, 1954
- Superseding agency: Defense Agency
- Jurisdiction: Government of Japan

The National Safety Agency (Japanese: 保安庁, Hepburn: Hoanchō; abbreviated NSA), was a post-WWII Japanese administrative agency. Operating from 1 August 1952 to 30 June 1954, it was established for the purpose of integrating the National Police Reserve and the Safety Security Force. The NSA is the predecessor of the Defense Agency (now the Ministry of Defense).

In order to maintain Japan's peace and order and protect human life and property, it was tasked to manage and operate the NPR, and to carry out affairs related to this, as well as to carry out security and rescue affairs at sea. In addition, the SSF, which was an affiliated organization, was responsible for maintaining public order at sea, violating laws and regulations, investigating and detecting crimes, arresting, and rescuing marine accidents.

== Purpose ==
It was established as an external agency of the Prime Minister's Office, which integrates the National Police Reserve, the Coast Guard of the Japan Coast Guard, and the Safety Security Guard. However, since a preparation period was required for the reorganization of the National Police Reserve into the National Safety Forces (predecessor of the Ground Self-Defense Force), under the provisions of the National Safety Agency Law, such provisions would come into effect on 15 October 1952, and the National Police Reserve and police officers belonging to the National Safety Forces would be in charge of the National Safety Agency from 1 August 1952 to 14 October 1952.

In addition, the Japan Coast Guard's National Security Forces became the Safety Security Force (predecessor of the Maritime Self-Defense Force), and the Japan Coast Guard's main body (other than security and rescue) was promulgated on 31 July 1952 by the Japan Coast Guard Law. Became the Marine Public Security Bureau, an organization attached to the National Safety Agency, and the name of the coast guard officer was changed to Marine Public Security Officer to maintain security at sea. However, the main body of the Japan Coast Guard, which is the administrative authority, strongly opposes and resists the law prepared by the legislature for two years, and the establishment of the Defense Agency and the Ground Self-Defense Force, the Maritime Self-Defense Force, and the Air Self-Defense Force With the inauguration, the Maritime Public Security Bureau Law was abolished on 1 July 1954, and the main body of the Japan Coast Guard was not integrated and will continue to exist as the Japan Coast Guard.

The Security Agency Law (Law No. 265 of 31 July 1952) was enacted at the 13th National Diet session on 31 July 1952, and was promulgated on the same day. Enforced on the day. According to Article 4 of the National Safety Agency Law, The National Safety Agency manages, operates, and operates units that act in special needs to maintain peace and order in our country and protect human lives and property. It was the duty to carry out the affairs related to security and rescue at sea.

According to the original National Safety Agency Law, the maximum number of employees of the National Safety Agency (excluding employees working at the Maritime Public Security Bureau) (excluding those who are hired for a period of up to two months, those who are on leave and those who are part-time) Was 119,947, of which 110,000 were sheriffs and 7,590 were guards (later maritime self-defense officers).

== Internal Departments ==
The Secretary's Office and each bureau shall give instructions to the 1st or 2nd Chief of Staff regarding the preparation of various policies and basic implementation plans regarding the National Safety Forces and the Coastal Security Forces, and the Chief of the First Staff or the Chief of Staff regarding matters concerning the National Safety Forces or the Coastal Security Forces. He assisted the Secretary in approval of the policies and basic implementation plans prepared by the Second Staff Chief and general supervision by the Secretary regarding the duties of the National Safety Forces or the Coastal Security Forces.

The Commissioner of the Japan Coast Guard is the Minister of State, and is the Deputy Secretary of State, the Deputy Secretary and the Secretariat, the Security Bureau, the Personnel Bureau, the Accounting Bureau, the Equipment Bureau, and two staff superintendents. The Department (predecessor of the Ground Staff Office) and the Second Staff Office (predecessor of the Maritime Staff Office) were established as the secretary's staff organization regarding the duties of the Guard.

== Action and Authority ==
=== Command dispatch ===
The Prime Minister may order the dispatch of all or part of the National Safety Forces or the Coastal Security Forces in the event of an emergency, if he / she finds it particularly necessary to maintain security. When the Prime Minister orders the dispatch, he / she must submit it to the National Diet within 20 days from the date of ordering the dispatch and seek its approval. The Secretary may, when he / she finds that there is a special need in the case of a dispatch order for all or part of the Coastal Security Force, put all or part of the Maritime Public Security Bureau under the control of the Coastal Security Force. However, if the National Diet is closed or the House of Representatives is dissolved, approval must be sought promptly at the first Diet convened thereafter. The Prime Minister shall promptly order the withdrawal of the National Safety Forces or the Coastal Security Forces when there is a disapproval vote or when there is no need to dispatch.

=== Dispatch standby order ===
When the situation is tense and it is predicted that an order to issue an order will be issued, the Secretary will, with the approval of the Prime Minister, the National Safety Forces or the Coastal Security Force when he / she finds it necessary to deal with this. It is possible to issue a dispatch standby order to all or part of.

=== Request dispatch ===
When the prefectural governor finds it unavoidable to maintain a serious situation in terms of security, he / she requests the Prime Minister to dispatch a unit of the National Safety Forces or the Guard in consultation with the relevant Prefectural Public Safety Commission. be able to. The Prime Minister may order the dispatch of troops if he / she finds it unavoidable at the request of the prefectural governor. When the prefectural governor finds that the situation has subsided and it is no longer necessary to dispatch the unit, he must promptly request the Prime Minister to withdraw the unit. The Prime Minister shall promptly order the withdrawal of troops at the request of the prefectural governor or when he / she finds that it is no longer necessary to dispatch troops. When the prefectural governor makes a request, he / she must promptly report to the council of the prefectural government after the situation has subsided.

=== Maritime security action ===
The Secretary may, with the approval of the Prime Minister, order the units of the Guard to take necessary actions at sea if there is an urgent need to protect human life or property at sea or maintain security.

=== Disaster dispatch ===
A prefectural governor or any other person specified by a Cabinet Order may request the Secretary or a person designated by him / her to dispatch a unit when he / she finds it necessary to protect human life or property in the event of a natural disaster, earth disaster or other disaster. The Secretary or a person designated by the Secretary may dispatch a unit for relief if he / she finds it unavoidable at the request of the prefectural governor. However, in the event of a fire or other disaster in or near the government building, premises or other facilities of the National Safety Agency, troops may be dispatched without waiting for the request set forth in the same paragraph (neighborhood dispatch).
