= Ranks and insignia of the Japan Self-Defense Forces =

The Ranks and insignia of the Japan Self-Defense Forces are the military insignia used by the Japan Self-Defense Forces.

== History ==
Following the end of World War II in Asia, after the surrender of Japan, the Imperial Japanese Army and Navy were dissolved by the Supreme Commander for the Allied Powers in 1945, during the Allied occupation that lasted until 1952. The 1947 constitution stipulated that armed forces with war potential will not be maintained. They were eventually replaced by the Japan Self-Defense Forces in 1954.

The 1871–1945 Japanese military and naval ranks were phased out after World War II. The Self-Defence Force breaks away from the Sino-centric tradition of non-branch-specified ranks; each JSDF rank with respect to each service carries a distinct Japanese title, although equivalent titles in different branches are still similar, differing only in the use of the morphemes riku (ground) for the army ranks, kai (maritime) for the naval ranks, and kū (air) for the aviation ranks.

The pentagramic stars on the insignia represent cherry blossoms. Because Japanese soldiers take an oath to die to protect the lives and wealth of Japanese citizens, they have been compared to delicate cherry blossoms that break easily.

In 2025, the Liberal Democratic Party–Japan Innovation Party coalition announced plans to rename ranks in the JSDF to more align with their international equivalents. Xinhua News Agency and The Asahi Shimbun highlighted that the new rank names are the same as those that existed in the Imperial Japanese Army, with Xinhua News Agency stating that this shows Japan is choosing to remilitarise.

== Ground Self-Defense Force ==
=== Commissioned officer ranks ===
The rank insignia of commissioned officers.

Rank group	General officers			Field officers			Junior officers
Rank	幕僚長たる陸将; Bakuryōchō-taru-rikushō (Note: The English notation in the English version of Defense White Paper is as follows.: 統合幕僚長たる将 General (Admiral) serving as Chief of Staff of Joint Staff Office.; 幕僚長たる将 General (Admiral) serving as JGSDF, JMSDF or JASDF Chief of Staff.; 将 General (JGSDF and JASDF), Vice Admiral (JMSDF).)	陸将; Rikushō	陸将補; Rikushō-ho	1等陸佐; Ittō rikusa	2等陸佐; Nitō rikusa	3等陸佐; Santō rikusa	1等陸尉; Ittō rikui	2等陸尉; Nitō rikui	3等陸尉; Santō rikui	准陸尉; Jun rikui
Insignia Type A
Insignia Type B
Insignia Miniature Type
U.S. equivalent	General	Lieutenant general	Major general	Colonel	Lieutenant colonel	Major	Captain	First lieutenant	Second lieutenant	Warrant officer

=== Other ranks ===
The rank insignia of non-commissioned officers and enlisted personnel.

Rank group	NCOs				Enlisted
Rank	陸曹長; Rikusōchō	1等陸曹; Ittō rikusō	2等陸曹; Nitō rikusō	3等陸曹; Santō rikusō	陸士長; Rikushichō	1等陸士; Ittō rikushi	2等陸士; Nitō rikushi	自衛官候補生; Jieikan kōhosei (Note: This rank is scheduled to be abolished in Fiscal year 2026/27.)
Insignia Type A
Insignia Type B
Insignia Miniature Type								No insignia
U.S. equivalent	First sergeant	Sergeant first class	Staff sergeant	Sergeant	Corporal	Private first class	Private	Recruit

== Maritime Self-Defense Force ==
=== Commissioned officer ranks ===
The rank insignia of commissioned officers.

Rank group	Flag officers			Senior officers			Junior officers
Rank	幕僚長たる海将; Bakuryōchō-taru-kaishō	海将; Kaishō	海将補; Kaishō-ho	1等海佐; Ittō kaisa	2等海佐; Nitō kaisa	3等海佐; Santō kaisa	1等海尉; Ittō kaii	2等海尉; Nitō kaii	3等海尉; Santō kaii	准海尉; Jun kaii
Insignia Type A
Insignia Type B
Insignia Type C
Insignia Miniature Type
U.S. equivalent	Admiral	Vice admiral	Rear admiral	Captain	Commander	Lieutenant commander	Lieutenant	Lieutenant (junior grade)	Ensign	Warrant officer

=== Other ranks ===
The rank insignia of non-commissioned officers and enlisted personnel.

Rank group	NCOs				Enlisted
Rank	海曹長; Kaisōchō	1等海曹; Ittō kaisō	2等海曹; Nitō kaisō	3等海曹; Santō kaisō	海士長; Kaishichō	1等海士; Ittō kaishi	2等海士; Nitō kaishi	自衛官候補生; Jieikan kōhosei
Insignia Type A
Insignia Type B
Insignia Type C								No insignia
Insignia Miniature Type								No insignia
U.S. equivalent	Senior chief petty officer	Chief petty officer	Petty officer first class	Petty officer second class	Petty officer third class	Seaman	Seaman apprentice	Seaman recruit

== Air Self-Defense Force ==
=== Commissioned officer ranks ===
The rank insignia of commissioned officers.

Rank group	Flag officers			Senior officers			Junior officers
Rank	幕僚長たる空将; Bakuryōchō-taru-kūshō	空将; Kūshō	空将補; Kūshō-ho	1等空佐; Ittō kūsa	2等空佐; Nitō kūsa	3等空佐; Santō kūsa	1等空尉; Ittō kūi	2等空尉; Nitō kūi	3等空尉; Santō kūi	准空尉; Jun kūi
Insignia Type A
Insignia Type B
Insignia Miniature Type
U.S. equivalent	General	Lieutenant general	Major general	Colonel	Lieutenant colonel	Major	Captain	First lieutenant	Second lieutenant	Warrant officer

=== Other ranks ===
The rank insignia of non-commissioned officers and enlisted personnel.

Rank group	NCOs				Enlisted
Rank	空曹長; Kūsōchō	1等空曹; Ittō kūsō	2等空曹; Nitō kūsō	3等空曹; Santō kūsō	空士長; Kūshichō	1等空士; Ittō kūshi	2等空士; Nitō kūshi	自衛官候補生; Jieikan kōhosei
Insignia Type A
Insignia Type B
Insignia Miniature Type								No insignia
U.S. equivalent	Senior master sergeant	Master sergeant	Technical sergeant	Staff sergeant	Senior Airman	Airman first class	Airman	Recruit

== Rank flags ==
Rank flags of general officers and flag officers of the Japanese Self-Defense Forces
Flags			
Ranks	General, or Admiral serving as Chief of Staff of the Joint Staff Office and Commander of Joint Operations Command		Major general, or Rear admiral
Functions	Joint Chiefs of Staff of the Japanese Self-Defense Forces	Commander of the Joint Operations Command of the Japanese Self-Defense Forces	Commander of a joint unit equivalent to a brigade

Rank flags of the general officers of the Japanese Ground Self-Defense Force
Flags					
Ranks	General serving as chief of staff	Lieutenant general		Major general	
Functions	Chief of Staff of the Japanese Ground Self-Defense Force	Major command and Army commander	Division commander	Brigade commander (Salary category 1)	Brigade commander (Salary category 2)

Rank flags of the flag officers of the Japanese Maritime Self-Defense Force
Flags				
Ranks	Admiral serving as chief of staff	Vice admiral	Rear admiral	Captain (Commander of a Senior Unit)
Functions	Chief of Staff of the Japanese Maritime Self-Defense Force	Fleet, squadron, and division commander	Division and flotilla commander	Division and flotilla commander

Rank flags of general officers of the Japanese Air Self-Defense Force
Flags			
Ranks	General serving as chief of staff	Lieutenant general	Major general
Functions	Chief of Staff of the Japanese Air Self-Defense Force	Air Command and Air Division Commander	Wing Commander

== Timeline ==
=== Timeline of commissioned officer ranks ===
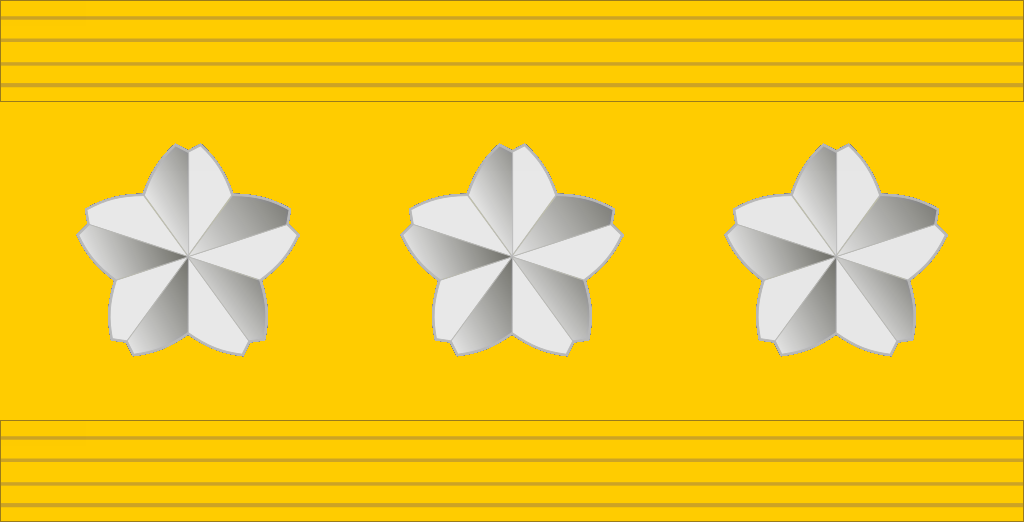
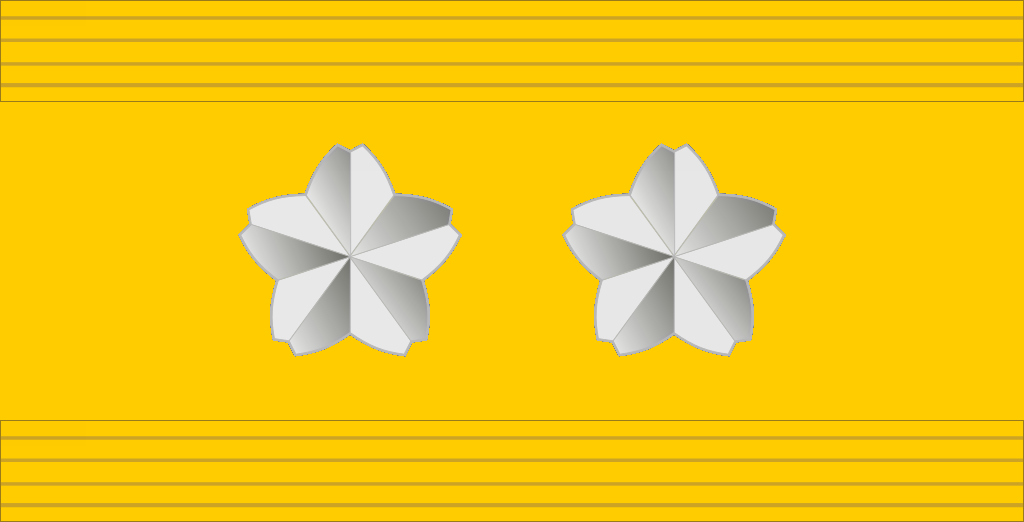
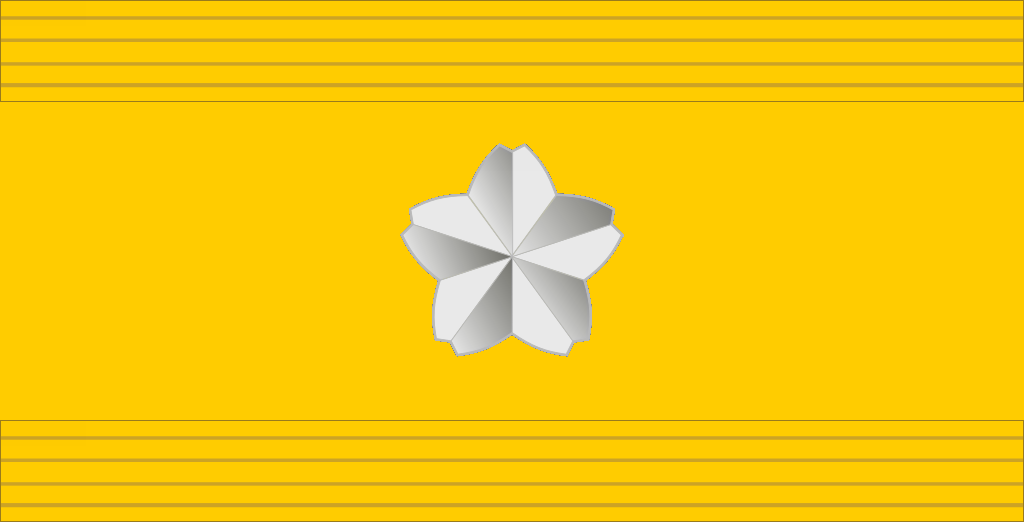
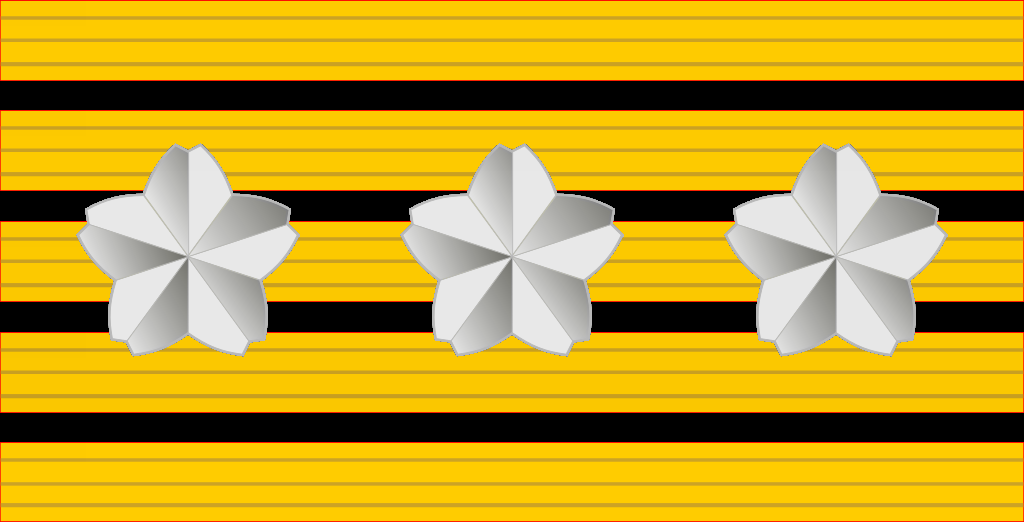
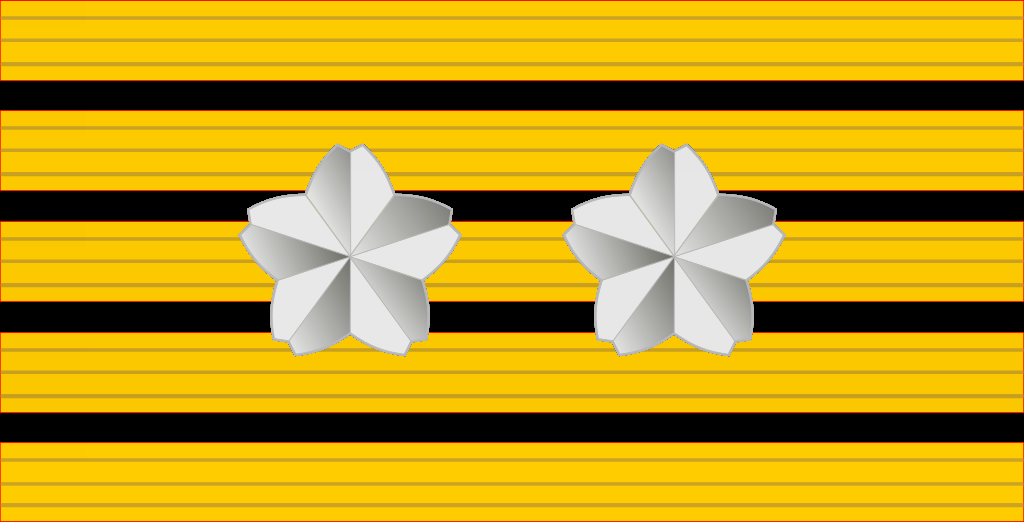
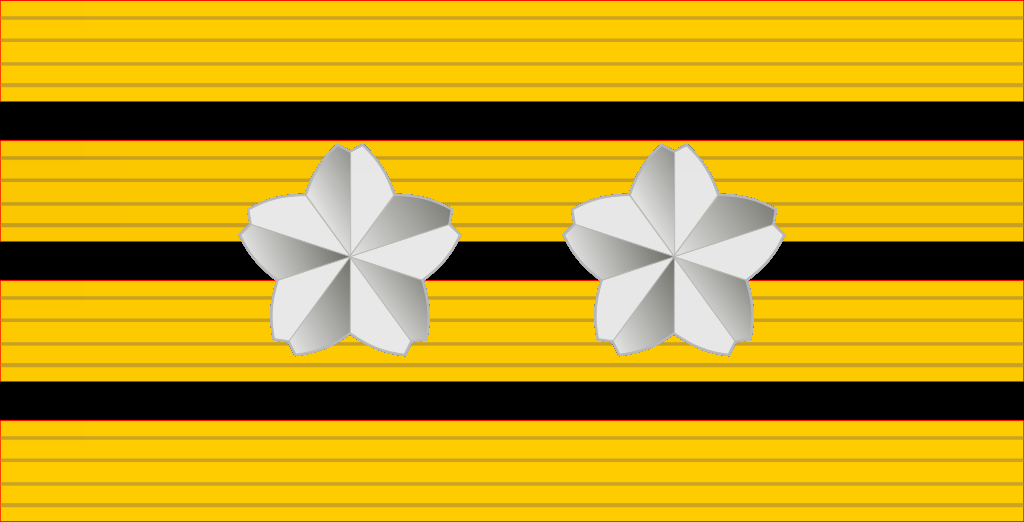
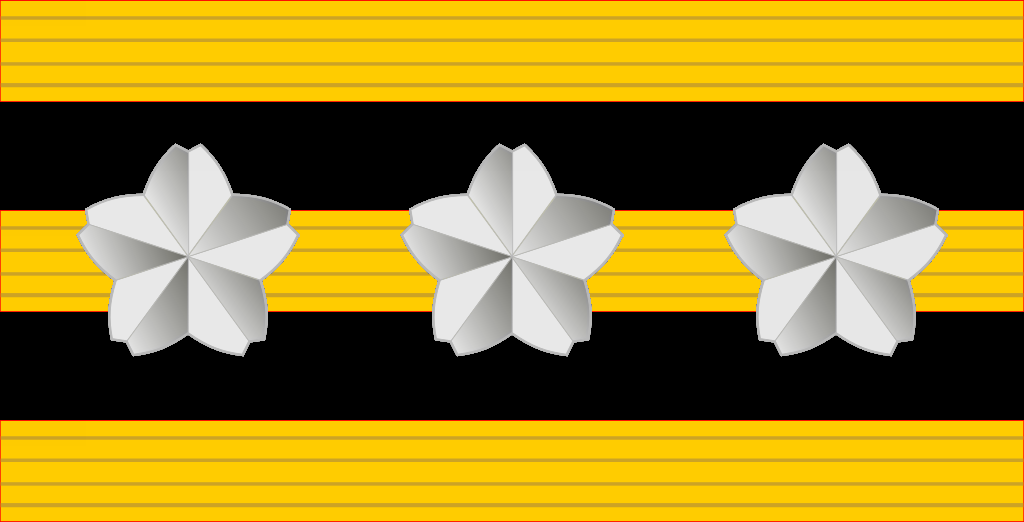
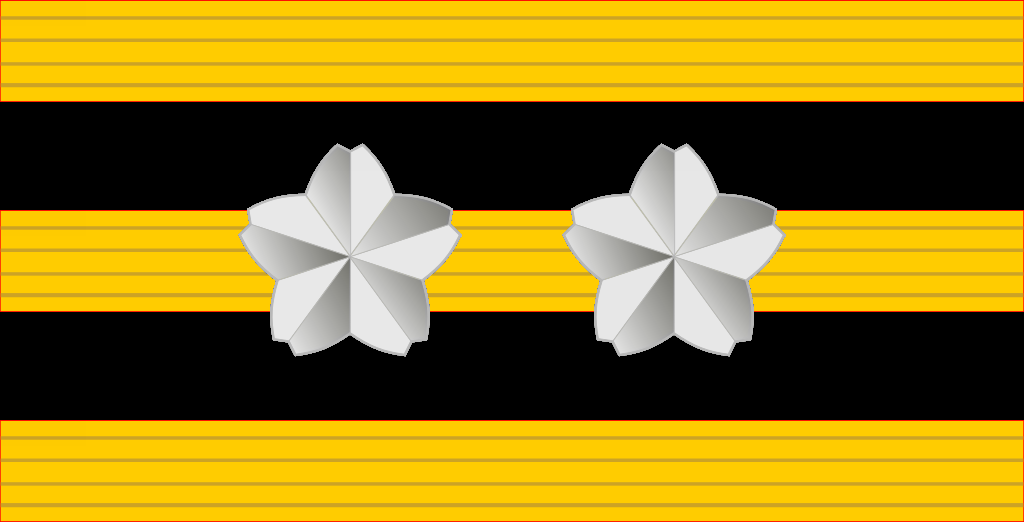
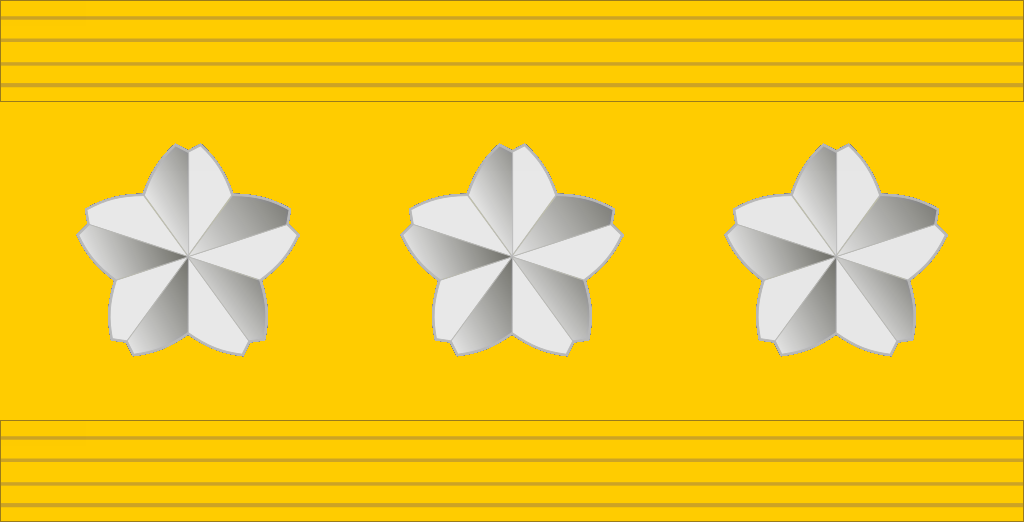
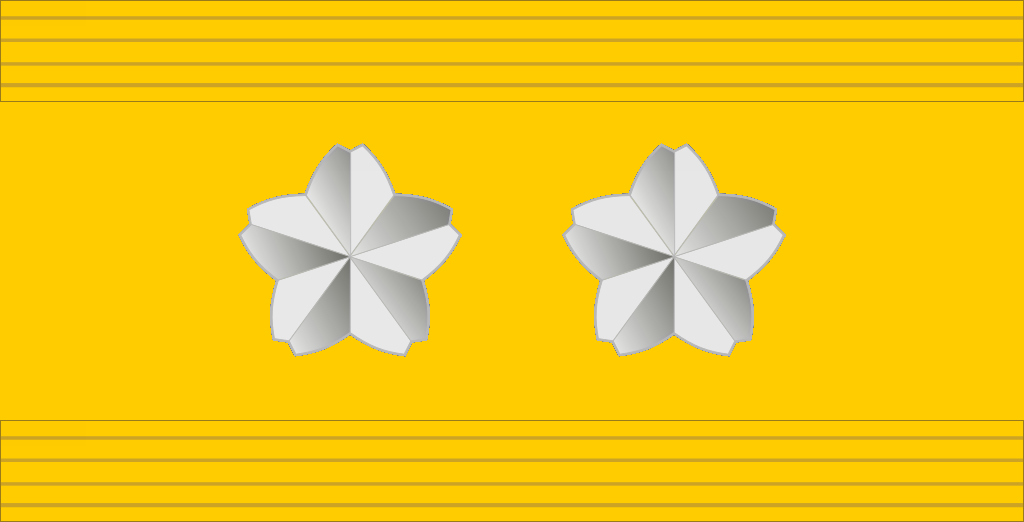
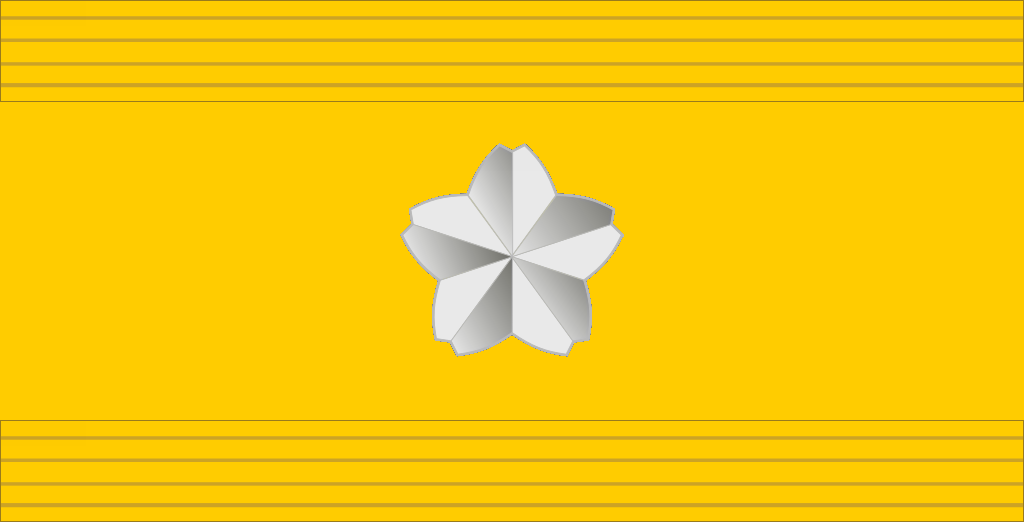
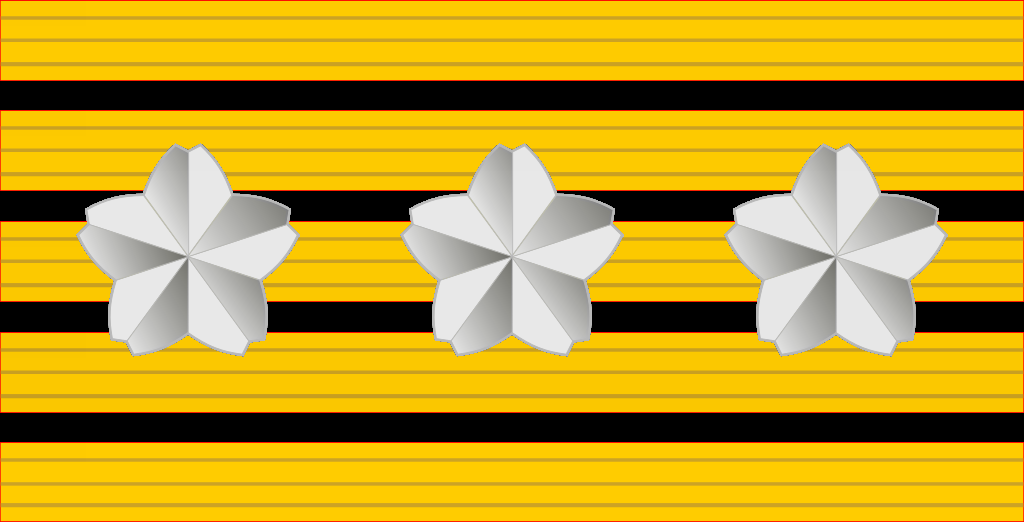
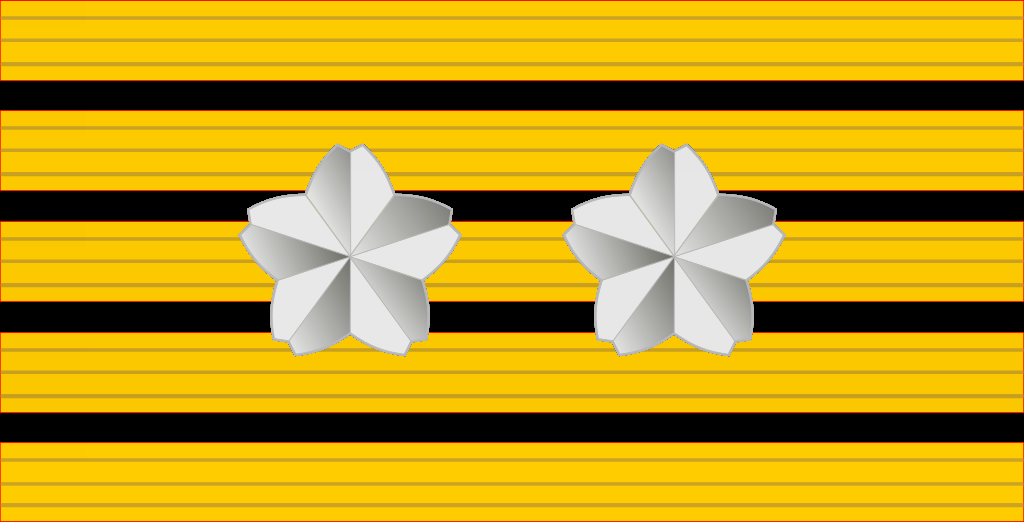
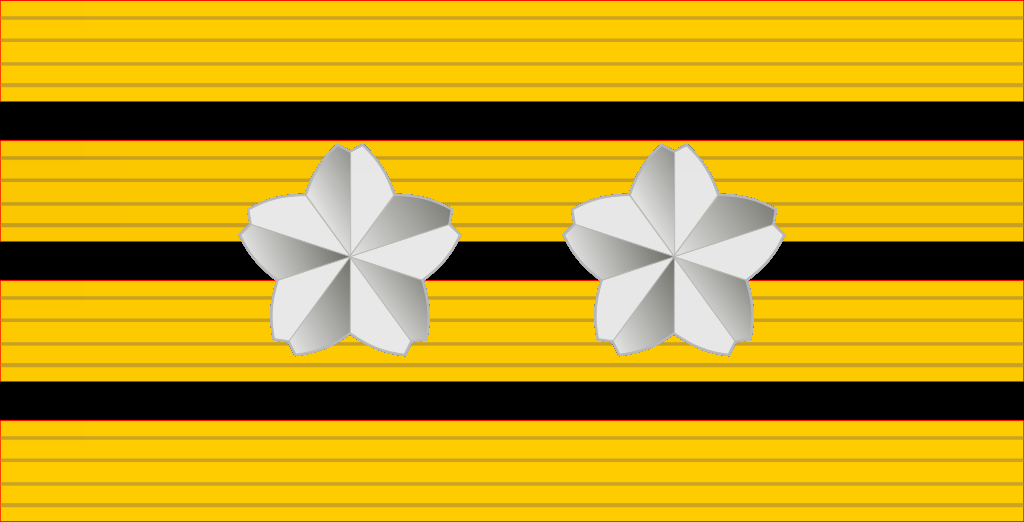
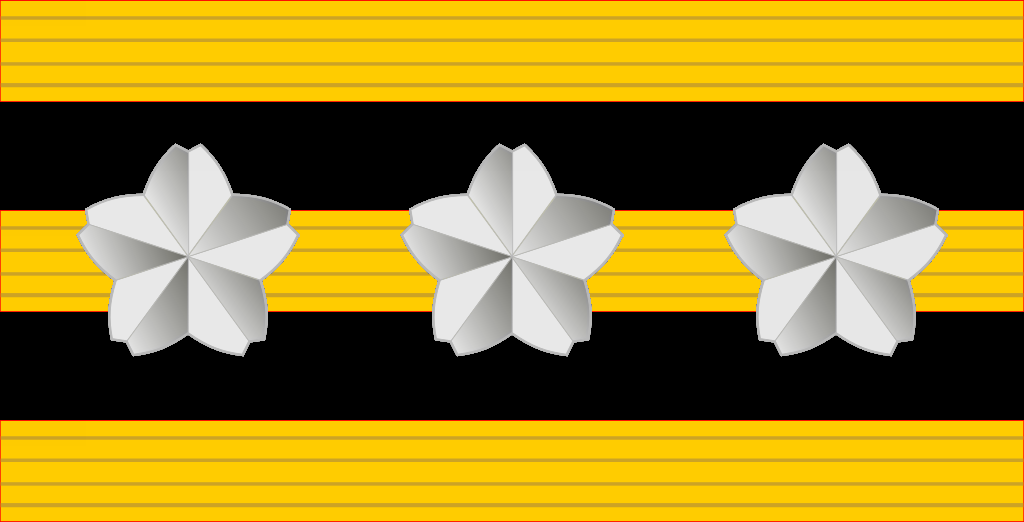
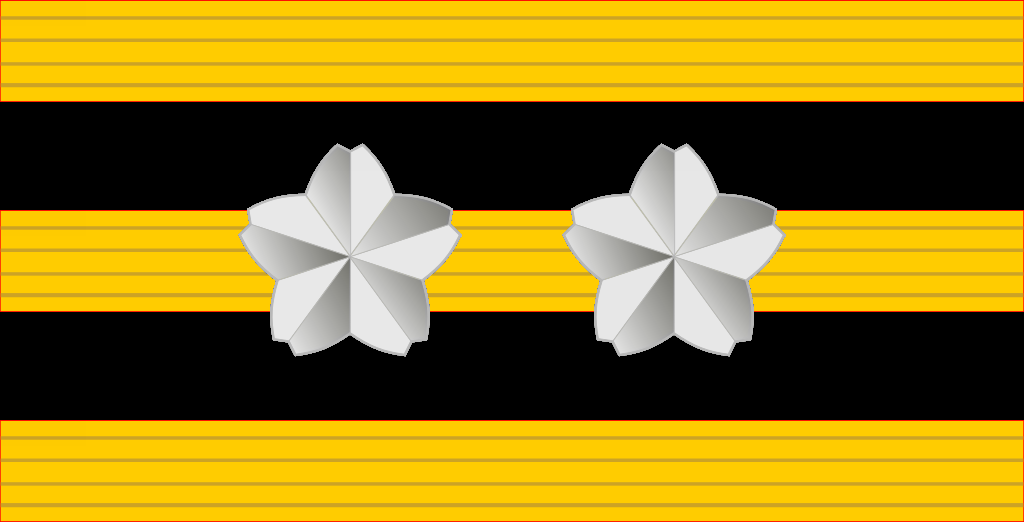
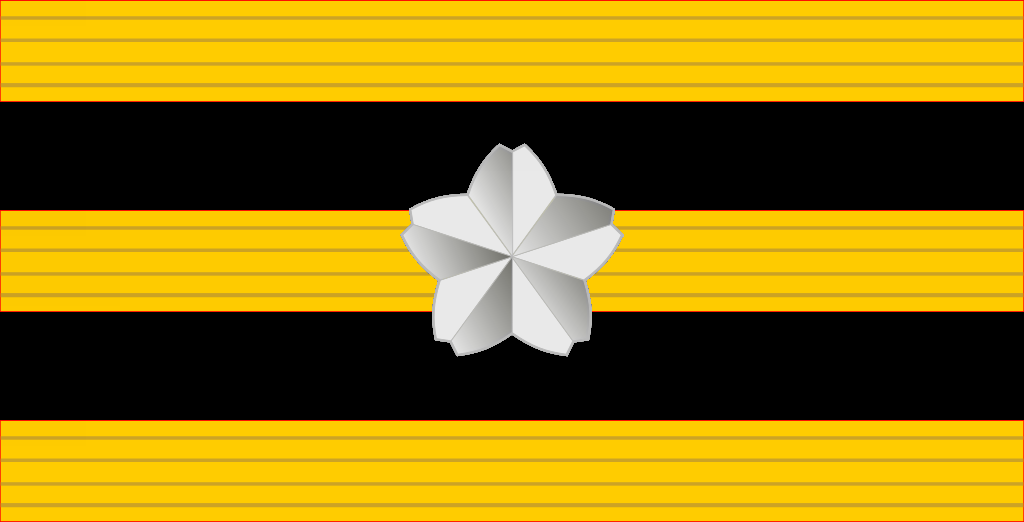
Rank group	General / Flag Officers				Field Officers			Junior Officers
National Police Reserve 1950–1952
National Police Reserve 1950–1952		総隊総監たる警察監 (Note: At that time, they corresponded to three-star rank, two-star rank and one-star rank respectively. パンツァー 1998年4月号 125頁。アルゴノート社。(PANZER April 1998 issu page.125 Argonaut.Inc.)); Sōtaisōkan-taru-keisatsukan	警察監; Keisatsukan	警察監補; Keisatsukan-ho	1等警察正; Ittō-keisatsusei	2等警察正; Nitō-keisatsusei	警察士長; Keisatsusi-chō	1等警察士; Ittō-keisatushi	2等警察士; Nitō-keisatsusi
National Safety Force; 1952–1954
National Safety Force; 1952–1954		第一幕僚長たる保安監; Dai'ichibakuryōchō-taru-hoankan	保安監; Hoankan	保安監補; Hoankan-ho	1等保安正; Ittō-hoansei	2等保安正; Nitō-hansei	3等保安正; Santō-hoansei	1等保安士 ittō-hoanshi	2等保安士; Nitō-hoanshi	3等保安士; Santō-hoanshi (Note: Established march 1953)
Coastal Safety Force; 1952
Coastal Safety Force; 1952		海上警備監 kaijō-keibikan (Note: SHIPS OF THE WORLD 2002.No.596 extra issue vol.59 May issue extra issue "50 years of JMSDF" page.22 Published by Kaijinsha.Co. Ltd. (世界の艦船 2002.No.596 増刊第59集 5月号増刊 海上自衛隊の50年 22頁。発刊 海人社。))		海上警備監補; Kaijō-keibikan-ho	1等海上警備正; Itto-kaijō-keibisei	2等海上警備正; Nitō-kaijō-keibisei	3等海上警備正; Santō-kaijō-keibisei	1等海上警備士; Itto-kaijō-keibishi	2等海上警備士; Nitō-kaijō-keibishi	3等海上警備士; Santō-kaijō-keibishi
Safety Security Force; 1952–1954
Safety Security Force; 1952–1954		第二幕僚長たる警備監; Dainibakuryōchō-taru-keibikan	警備監 (Note: Keibikan's cuff insignia used a gold stripe of broad, thin and thick array.); Keibikan	警備監補; Keibikan-ho	1等警備正; Ittō-keibisei	2等警備正; Nitō-keibisei	3等警備正; Santō-keibisei	1等警備士; Ittō-keibishi	2等警備士; Nitō-keibishi	3等警備士; Santō-keibishi
Rank group	General / Flag Officers				Field Officers			Junior Officers
Self-Defense Forces 1954–1962
Self-Defense Forces 1954–1962		将 Shō		将補; Shō-ho	1佐; Issa	2佐; Nisa	3佐; Sansa	1尉; Ichi'i	2尉; Ni'i	3尉; San'i
1962–1970	幕僚長たる将; Bakuryōchō-taru-shō	将 Shō		将補; Shō-ho	1佐; Issa	2佐; Nisa	3佐; Sansa	1尉; Ichi'i	2尉; Ni'i	3尉; San'i
1970–current
1970–current	幕僚長たる将; Bakuryōchō-taru-shō	将 Shō		将補; Shō-ho	1佐; Issa	2佐; Nisa	3佐; Sansa	1尉; Ichi'i	2尉; Ni'i	3尉; San'i	准尉; Jun'i
U.S. equivalent	GEN; ADM; Gen.	LTG; VADM; Lt.Gen.	MG; RADM; Maj.Gen.	BG; RDML; Brig.Gen.	COL; CAPT; Col.	LTC; CDR; Lt.Col.	MAJ; LCDR; Maj.	CPT; LT; Capt.	1LT; LTJG; 1st LT.	2LT; ENS; 2nd LT.	WO; WO; WO

=== Timeline of other ranks ===
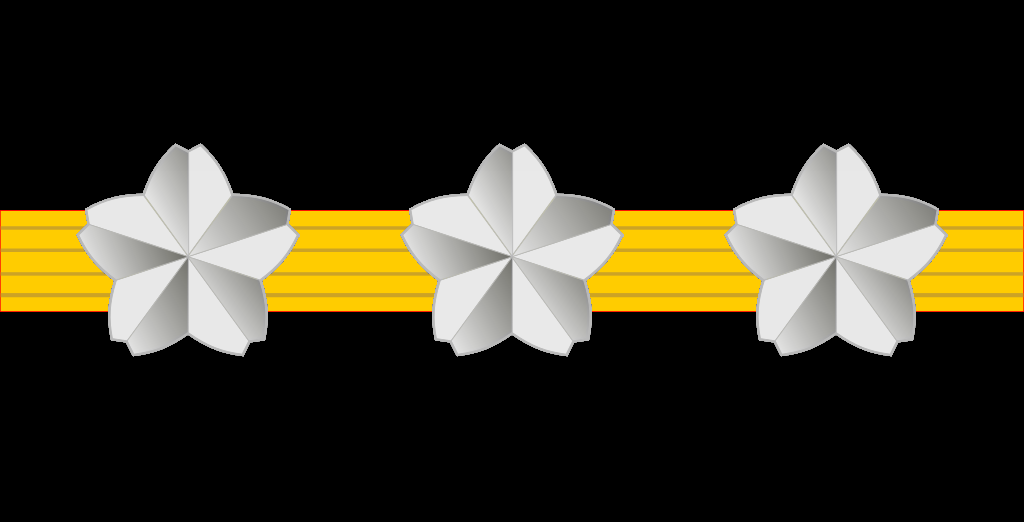
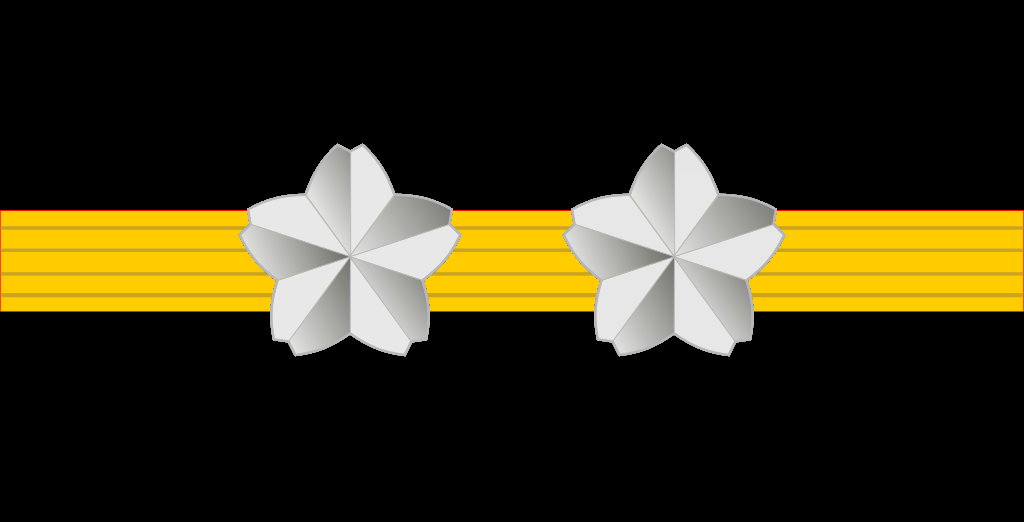
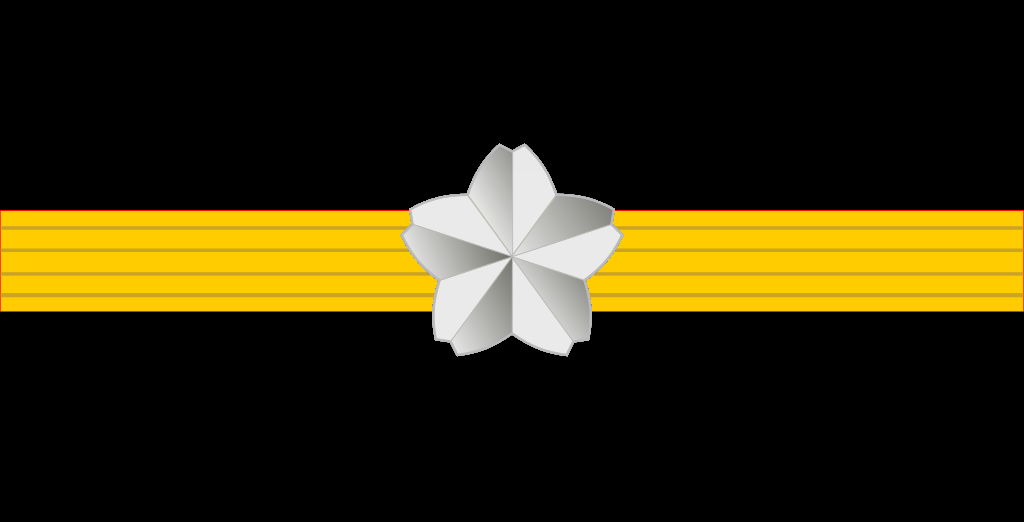
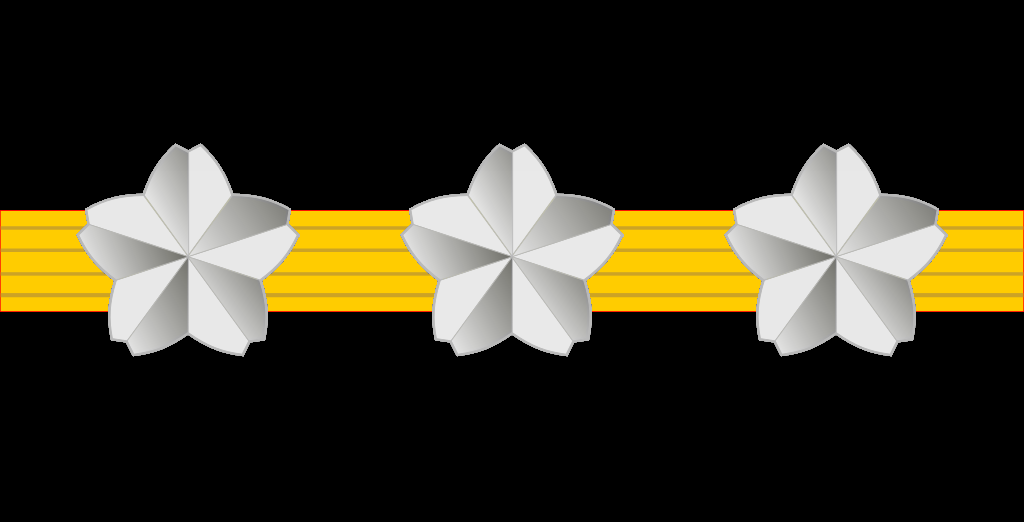
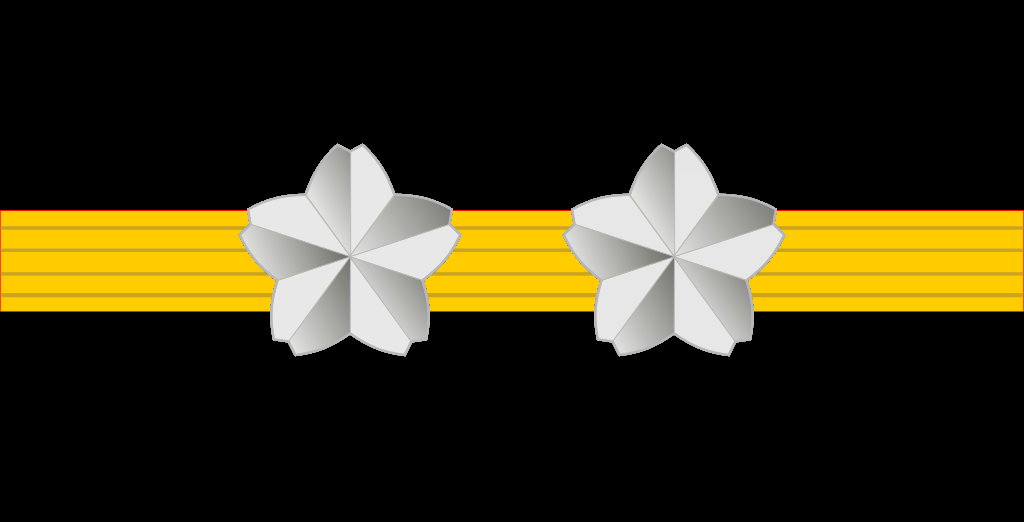
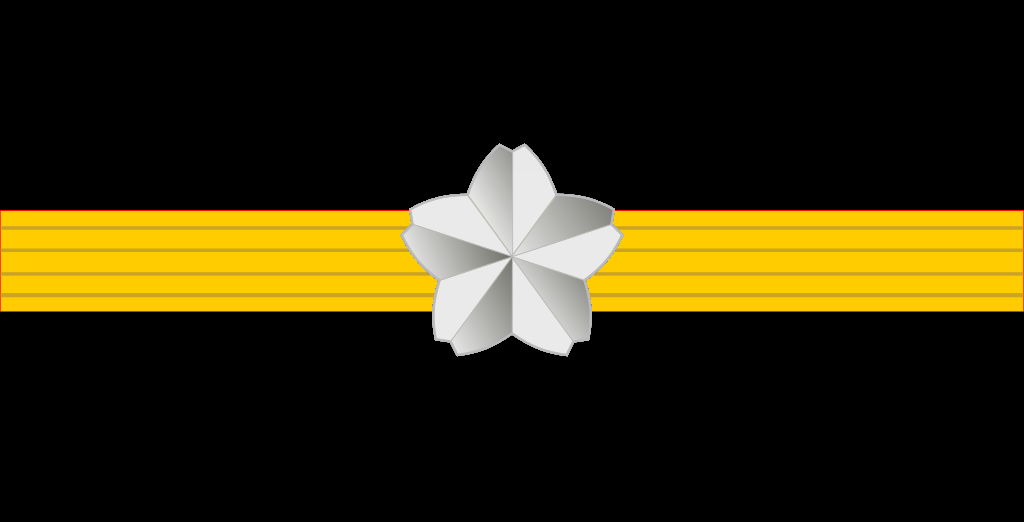
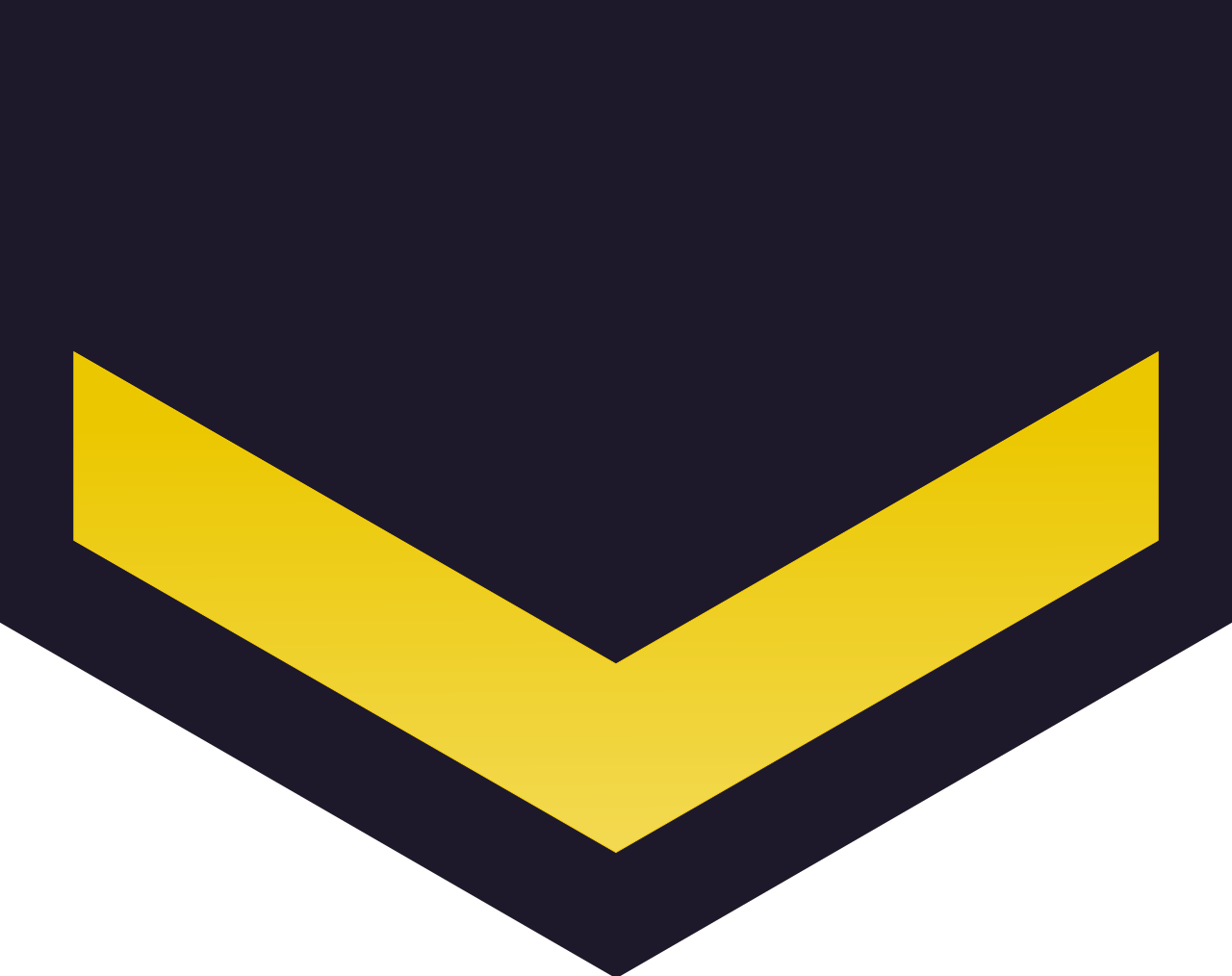
Rank group	NCO's					Enlisted
National Police Reserve; 1950–1952
National Police Reserve; 1950–1952		1等警察士補; Ittō-keisatsushi-ho	2等警察士補; Nitō-keisatsushi-ho	3等警察士補; Santō-keisatsushi-ho	警査長; Keisa-chō	1等警査; Ittō-keisa	2等警査; Nitō-keisa
National Safety Force; 1952–1954
National Safety Force; 1952–1954		1等保安士補; Ittō-hoanshi-ho	2等保安士補; Nitō-hoanshi-ho	3等保安士補; Santō-hoanshi-ho	保査長; Hosa-chō	1等保査; Ittō-hosa	2等保査; Nitō-hosa
Coastal Safety Force; 1952
Coastal Safety Force; 1952		1等海上警備士補; Ittō-kaijōkeibishi-ho	2等海上警備士補; Nitō-kaijōkeibishi-ho	3等海上警備士補; Santō-kaijōkeibishi-ho	海上警備員長; Kaijōkeibi'in-chō	1等海上警備員; Ittō-kaijōkeibi'in	2等海上警備員; Nitō-kaijōkeibi'in	3等海上警備員; Santō-kaijōkeibi'in
Safety Security Force; 1952–1954
Safety Security Force; 1952–1954		1等警備士補; Ittō-keibishi-ho	2等警備士補; Nitō-keibishi-ho	3等警備士補; Santō-keibishi-ho	警査長; Keisa-chō	1等警査; Ittō-keisa	2等警査; Nitō-keisa	3等警査; Santō-keisa
Self-Defense Forces; 1954–1980
Self-Defense Forces; 1954–1980		1曹; Issō	2曹; Nisō	3曹; Sansō	士長; Shichō	1士; Isshi	2士; Nishi	3士; Sanshi
1980–2010
1980–2010	曹長; Sōchō	1曹; Issō	2曹; Nisō	3曹; Sansō	士長; Shichō	1士; Isshi	2士; Nishi	3士; Sanshi
2010–current
2010–current	曹長; Sōchō	1曹; Issō	2曹; Nisō	3曹; Sansō	士長; Shichō	1士; Isshi	2士; Nishi	自衛官候補生; Jieikan-kōhosei
U.S. equivalent	1SG; SCPO; SMSgt	SFC; CPO; MSgt	SSG; PO1; TSgt	SGT; PO2; SSgt	CPL; PO3; SrA	PFC; SN; A1C	PV2; SA; Amn	PV1; SR; AB

=== Rank flags (1 August 1952 – 10 January 1956) ===
Rank flags of the Flag Officer of the Safety Security Force and Japan Maritime Self-Defense Force (1 August 1952 – 10 January 1956)
Flags				
Ranks (Sefety Security Force)	Vice Admiral	Rear Admiral Senior	Rear Admiral Junior	Captain (Commander of a Senior Unit)
Ranks (Japan Maritime Self-Defense Force)	Vice Admiral		Rear Admiral	Captain (Commander of a Senior Unit)
Functions	Chief of Staff	Vice Chief of Staff、Commander of the Self-Defense Fleet and Commandant of the Yokosuka District	Commandant of the Kure, Sasebo, Maizuru, and Ōminato District and Flotilla Commander	Flotilla Commander

== See also ==
- Ranks of the Imperial Japanese Army
- Ranks of the Imperial Japanese Navy
