= Safety Security Force =

Safety Security Force of Japan

- 警備隊
- Safety Security Force flag
- Founded: 1 August 1952; 73 years ago
- Disbanded: 30 June 1954; 71 years ago
- Country: Japan
- Branch: Navy
- Type: Coast guard
- Role: Disaster response Humanitarian aid Law enforcement Maritime patrol Maritime safety Maritime search and rescue Maritime security Maritime security operations Maritime transport Minesweeping
- Size: 7,828 personnel 74+ ships 5+ aircraft
- Part of: National Safety Agency

The Safety Security Force (Japanese: 警備隊, Hepburn: Keibitai; abbreviated SSF), also known as the Coastal Security Force, was an organization under the jurisdiction of the National Safety Agency, and existed from 1 August 1952 to 30 June 1954 in Japan. It was a maritime security agency established for the purpose of territorial waters security. It was the successor to the Maritime Safety Agency and the predecessor of the Maritime Self-Defense Force.

According to Article 5, Paragraph 2 of the National Safety Agency Law (Law No. 265 of 1952), the National Safety Agency Secretary, Deputy Director, Secretariat and each bureau, Second Staff Supervision Department and Second Staff Chief were all stipulated to include units and other organizations under their supervision.

== History ==
=== Background ===
With the surrender of Japan on 2 September 1945, the Japanese army went through disarmament and was dissolved. In the Navy, the Imperial Japanese Navy General Staff was dissolved, and the Ministry of the Navy, which was the military administration department, was reduced and reorganized into the 2nd Ministry of Demobilization, which took over some operations such as demobilization and route enlightenment. Furthermore, with the progress of demobilization, in 1946, it was integrated with the 1st Ministry of Demobilization (Army Ministry), and the Demobilization Agency (2nd Demobilization Agency), which is an external agency of the Cabinet, and later under the direct control of the Prime Minister's Office. After that, it became a part of the Ministry of Health and Welfare (Demobilization Bureau).

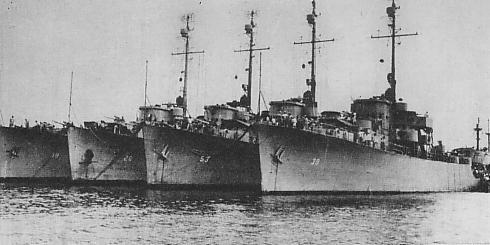
Coastal Security Force ships (Kusu-class patrol ship)

However, even after the war, the need to open the route for mines laid by both the US and Japanese forces during World War II was serious. For this reason, the Navy's minesweeping unit, which once stopped the minesweeping work and dismantled, but was immediately reorganized as the Minesweeping Division of the General Affairs Bureau of the 2nd Ministry of Demobilization on September 18, and the work was resumed. After that, it changed to the Minesweeper Division of the General Affairs Department of the 2nd Demobilization Agency and the Minesweeper Division of the Demobilization Agency.

On the other hand, as the deterioration of offshore security became more serious due to the demobilization of the Japanese Navy, in 1946, the Japan Coast Guard became a law enforcement agency under the Ministry of Transport, incorporating these former Navy-derived sweeping units. It was installed. However, at the time of its establishment, in response to instructions from the GHQ Civil Affairs Bureau in consideration of the backlash from the Far Eastern Commission against the armed Japan Coast Guard ships, strict restrictions were imposed on displacement, armament, and speed in order to clearly indicate that the patrol boat was not for military use.

In October 1950, after receiving an informal consultation regarding the Tacoma-class frigate (PF) loan from the US Far East fleet, former Admiral Kichisaburo Nomura, former Admiral Zenshiro Hoshina, and former Demobilization Agency Second Rehabilitation Bureau, an informal study of the Navy's revival was undertaken, centered on Navy personnel. On 19 October 1951, at a meeting between Prime Minister Shigeru Yoshida and General Matthew Ridgway, Supreme Commander for the Allied Powers (SCAP), 18 frigates (PF) and 50 landing support crafts (LSSL) were proposed. The lending proposal was officially made, and Prime Minister Yoshida accepted it on the spot. Then, in order to accept these vessels and establish an operation system, the Y Committee was set up as a secret organization under the direct control of the Cabinet and examined it.

The members of the Y Committee were appointed by former Navy personnel and the Japan Coast Guard Officer, and were in close cooperation with the US side. As a result of the examination by the Y Committee, these vessels will be centrally operated by a dedicated department set up within the Japan Coast Guard, separately from other patrol vessels, just before the San Francisco Peace Treaty came into effect. On 26 April 1952, the Coast Guard was established at the Japan Coast Guard.

=== Inauguration ===
==== 1952 ====
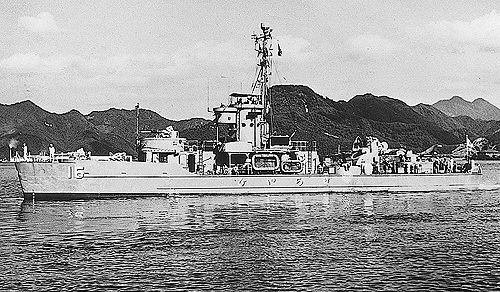
Yuri-class landing support craft

On 1 August, the National Safety Agency was established as an external agency of the Prime Minister's Office. The Coastal Safety Force was changed to the Coastal Security Force, and the National Police Reserve was changed to the National Safety Forces and integrated into the agency. Along with this, the Coastal Safety Force General Supervision Department was changed to the Second Staff Supervision Department, and two district units (Yokosuka District Force and Maizuru District Force) were newly formed on the Pacific Ocean and the Sea of Japan side, respectively. Also, on the same day, the Japan Coast Guard's route enlightenment work was transferred to the Coastal Security Force along with the minesweeper and its personnel.

Kogoro Yamazaki, the Chief of Staff of the Coastal Safety Force, continued to serve as the first Chief of Staff, Second Staff. The Second Staff Office consisted of the General Affairs Department, the Security Department, the Route Enlightenment Department, the Accounting and Supply Department, and the Engineering Department. In addition, the capacity at that time was 7,828 (7,590 guards, 238 workers), excluding those whom were hired for a period of up to two months and those who were on leave and those who were part-time.

On 1 November, the 1st to 10th Mine Warfare Forces were formed with minesweepers belonging to each route enlightenment corps under the control of the district corps, and were incorporated into each route enlightenment corps.

==== 1953 ====
On 14 January, the first vessels (6 PF, 4 LSSL) based on the Japan-US Ship Lease Agreement was delivered, and the 1st, 2nd, and 11th fleets were reorganized on the same date.

On 1 April, the 1st fleet group (currently the 1st escort group) was formed by the command guard ship JDS Ume, the 1st fleet (4 PF ships), and the 2nd fleet (4 PF ships).

On 16 August, the 2nd fleet group (currently the 2nd escort group) was formed by the command guard ship JDS Momi, the 11th fleet (6 LSSL ships), and the 12th fleet (6 LSSL ships).

On 16 September, a large-scale reorganization was carried out, and the Sasebo District Force and the Ominato District Force were newly formed. The route enlightenment corps of each district corps was abolished, the base guard corps was set up in each district corps, and the Kure district base corps was newly formed in Kure, and the base corps was newly formed in Osaka, Shimonoseki, and Hakodate. Traditional mine warfare forces have been incorporated into base guards, local bases, and bases, respectively. In addition, the Tateyama Air Group (currently the 21st Air Group) was newly established under the control of the Yokosuka District Force as the first aviation unit of the Coastal Security Force, and the Coastal Security Force Technical School was established in Yokosuka as an educational institution.

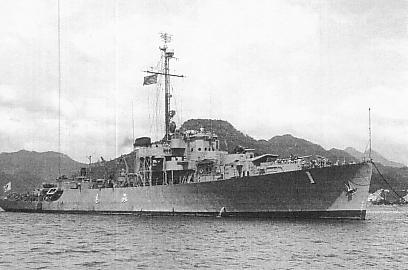
JDS Momi in 1953

On 16 October, the Second Staff Office was reorganized, the Second Staff Deputy Chief and the Investigation Department were placed, the Route Opening Department was abolished, and its operations were transferred to the Security Department. Along with this, the district general supervision department was reorganized, the route enlightenment department was abolished, and an investigation room was set up.

On 1 December, the Kanoya Air Group (currently the 1st Air Group) is newly incorporated into the Sasebo District Force.

==== 1954 ====
On 9 June, promulgation of the Prime Minister's Ordinance (Prefectural Ordinance No. 33) regarding the oath of service of the National Safety Agency staff.

On 21 June, service members took oath of their service. When the Guard, which was a complementary organization of the police, became the Self-Defense Forces with the mission of national defense, an oath suitable for the new mission was required.

=== Disaster dispatch ===
==== 1953 ====
From 28 June to 10 July, was the first disaster dispatch of the Coastal Security Force for flood damage in western Japan (Shimonoseki, Kure, Osaka, Sasebo route enlightenment corps). In this 12-day activity of 41 minesweepers in total, the results of communication support, clearing of route obstacles, about 338 tons of relief supplies, and marine transportation of 20 people were achieved.

From 18 July to 1 August, was dispatched for floods in Wakayama Prefecture (1st Fleet Group, 16th Fleet, Kure / Osaka Route Enlightenment Corps, etc.). In this activity of 148 vessels in total, 2,719 people were transported, 189 tons of relief supplies were transported, and 57 vessels were transported by boat.

==== 1954 ====
From 11 May to 26 May, a disaster dispatch was made to a group of fishing boats in distress off the coast of Nemuro (1st Fleet Group, Ominato District Force).

== Equipment ==
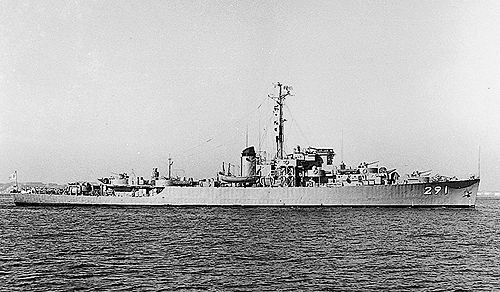
JDS Kiri, date unknown

Originally, the predecessor Coastal Safety Force was an organization that was established to centrally operate the Tacoma-class frigate (PF) provided by the United States, but it took time for diplomatic and political procedures and ship maintenance. The official delivery was not in time for the Coastal Safety Force era, and the ship was only undertaken for storage (borrowing) after the maintenance was completed. At the time of the inauguration of the Coastal Security Force, there were only 76 vessels, including 4 patrol frigates (PF), 2 Landing Craft Support crafts (LSSL), and minesweepers under the jurisdiction of the Japan Coast Guard.

The US-Japan Ship Lease Agreement came into effect on 27 December 1952, and the first delivery ceremony was held on 14 January 1953. Since then, 18 PFs and 50 LSSLs have been lent 11 times until December 23. These were called guard ships and were all named after flowers. In April 1953, the 1st Fleet Group was formed by these ships.

In order to solve this shortage of ships, a new domestic ship construction plan was drafted in the 1953 plan, and construction of two A-type guard ships (later Harukaze-class escort ships) and three B-type guard ships (Akebono / Ikazuchi-class escort ships). Has been decided.

However, because domestic ships were not completed immediately, the Japan-US ship loan agreement was signed on 14 May 1954, and Gleaves-class destroyer (Asakaze-class destroyer) and Fletcher-class destroyer (Ariake-class destroyer) were signed. Cannon-class destroyer escort (Asahi-class destroyer escort), Gato-class submarine (JDS Kuroshio), etc. would be rented. Although it was not until the Maritime Self-Defense Force received these rented ships, it became the core of the Maritime Self-Defense Force's strength at the time of its establishment, and it was in a position as a de facto navy.

The aircraft first received was a Bell-47D helicopter at the Susaki Heliport on 6 August 1953, and then received a total of four aircraft. They also bought three S-51s and two S-55s. These rotorcraft were deployed to the Tateyama Air Group. For fixed-wing aircraft, they purchased a training aircraft and deployed it to the Kanoya Air Group.

The guard ships were supposed to display the national flag and the guard flag, but the guard flag was enacted on 8 November 1952 and was hoisted until the self-defense ship flag was enacted.
