= Mashū-class replenishment ship =

Naval ship

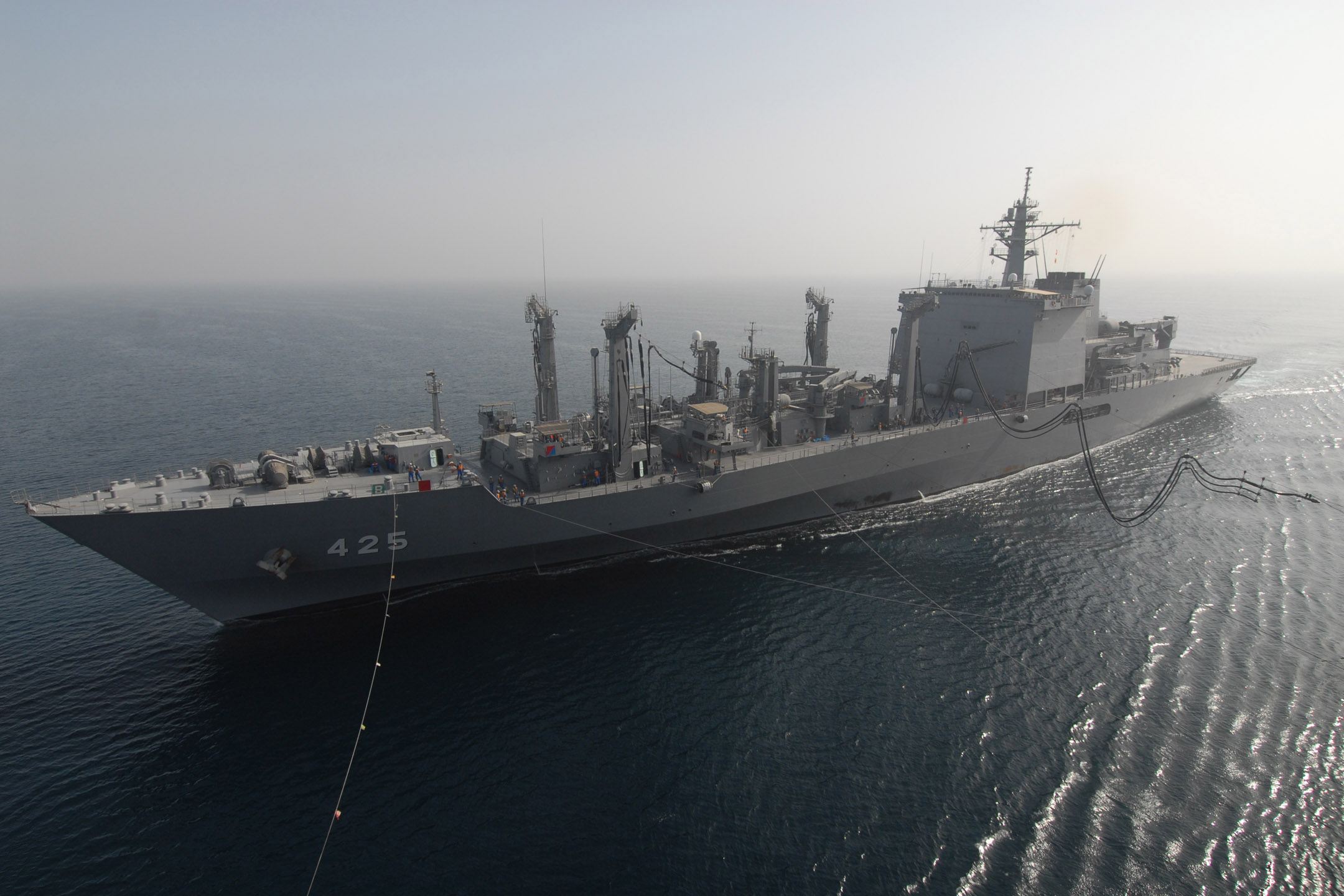
- JS Mashū underway in the Persian Gulf on 22 September 2006.

Class overview
- Builders: Hitachi Shipbuilding Corporation, Maizuru Ishikawajima-Harima Heavy Industries, Tokyo
- Operators: Japan Maritime Self-Defense Force
- Preceded by: Towada class
- Planned: 2
- Completed: 2
- Active: 2

General characteristics
- Type: Fast combat support ship
- Displacement: 13,500 tonnes standard; 25,000 tonnes full load
- Length: 221 m (725 ft)
- Beam: 27.0 m (88.6 ft)
- Draught: 8.0 m (26.2 ft)
- Propulsion: 2 × Kawasaki Rolls-Royce Spey SM1C gas turbines; 40,000 shp (29,828 kW) each; 2 × shafts
- Speed: 24 knots (44 km/h; 28 mph)
- Range: 9,500 nmi (17,594 km; 10,932 mi) at 20 knots (37 km/h; 23 mph)
- Complement: 150
- Sensors & processing systems: OPS-28 Surface Search RDF; OPS-20 Navigation RDF
- Electronic warfare & decoys: NOLR-8 RDF Interceptor; Mk.137 decoy launchers
- Armament: 2 × Phalanx CIWS
- Aircraft carried: 1 × helicopter
- Aviation facilities: Helicopter deck and enclosed hangar

The Mashū-class is a series of replenishment oilers of the Japan Maritime Self-Defense Force (JMSDF). They were built from 2002-04. The ships have the hull designator AOE.

The Mashū-class was designed as an enlarged, improved version of the Towada-class fast combat support ships. The vessels are capable of mounting two Phalanx CIWS by design. They have been in commission from 2004 onwards.

== List of ships ==
Name	Number	Laid down	Launched	Completed	Commissioned	Homeport	Status
Mashū (ましゅう)	AOE-425	21 January 2002	5 February 2003	15 March 2004	3 April 2006	Maizuru	Active
Ōmi (おうみ)	AOE-426	7 February 2003	19 February 2004	3 March 2005	3 April 2006	Yokosuka	Active

== Gallery ==
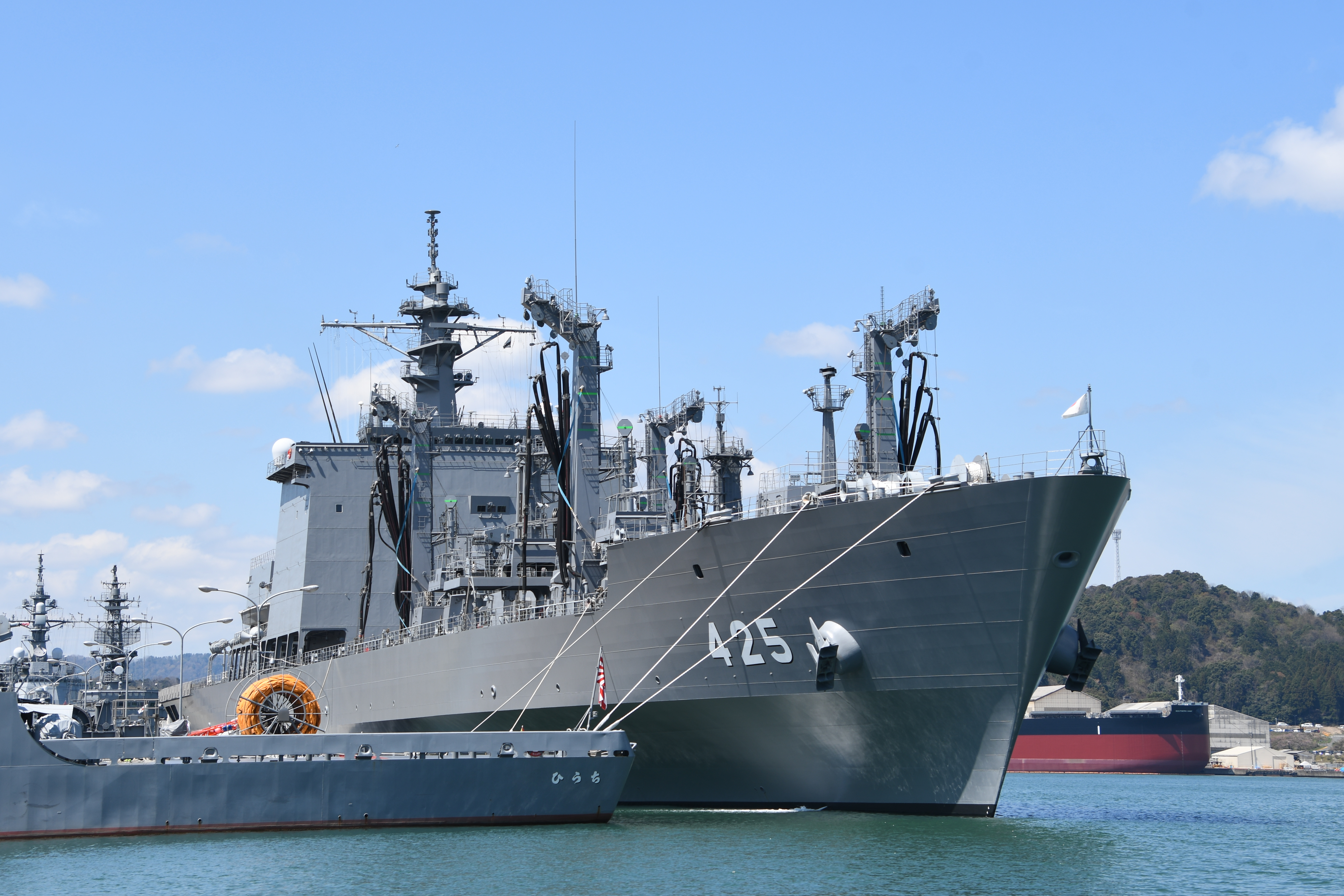
JS Mashū in Maizuru Naval Base on 13 April 2019.

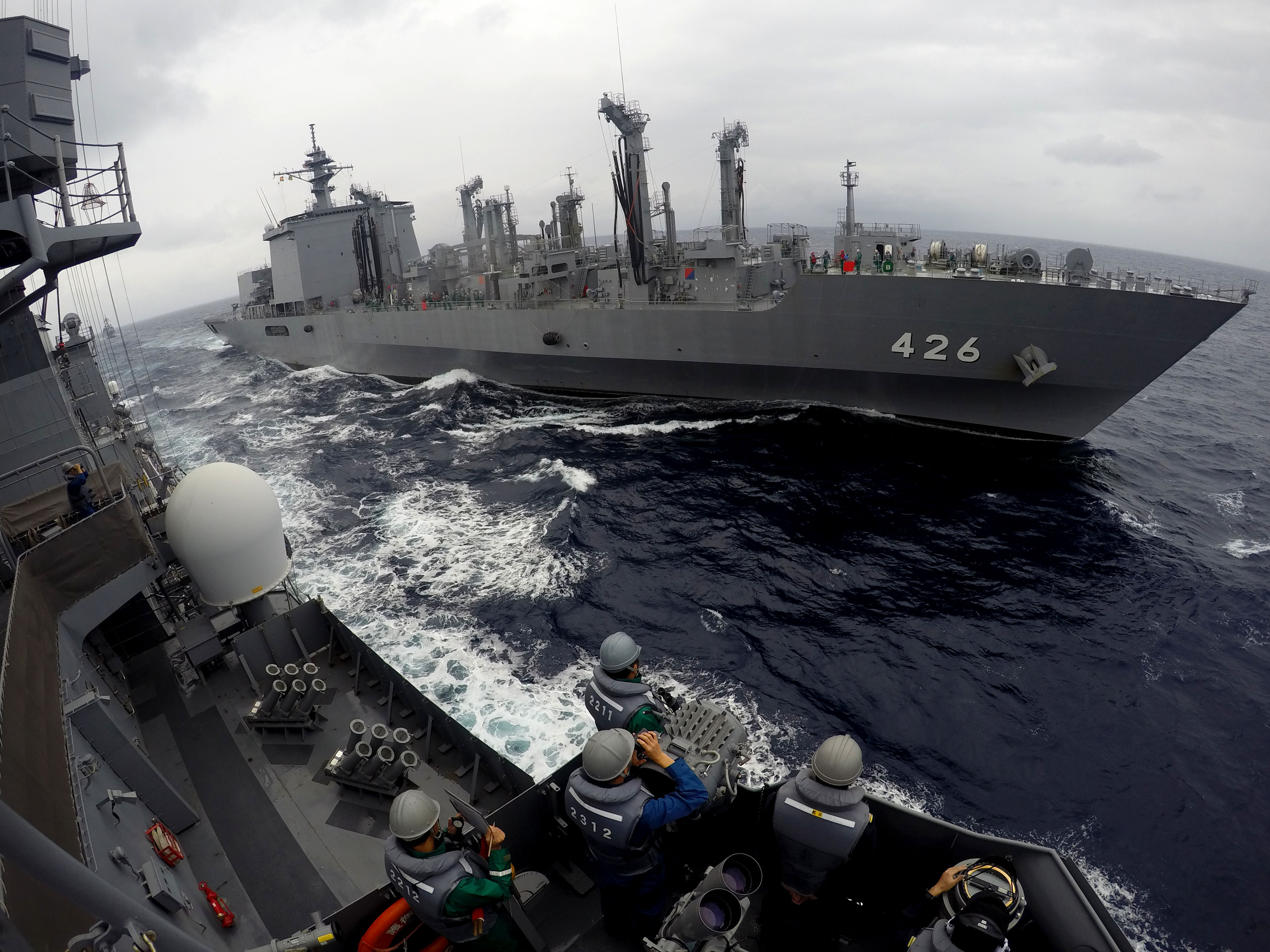
JS Ōmi underway in January 2017.
