= JMSDF Maizuru Naval Base =

Installations in Kyoto Prefecture, Japan

Maizuru Naval Base
- 舞鶴基地
- Part of Maizuru District Force
- Maizuru, Kansai region in Japan
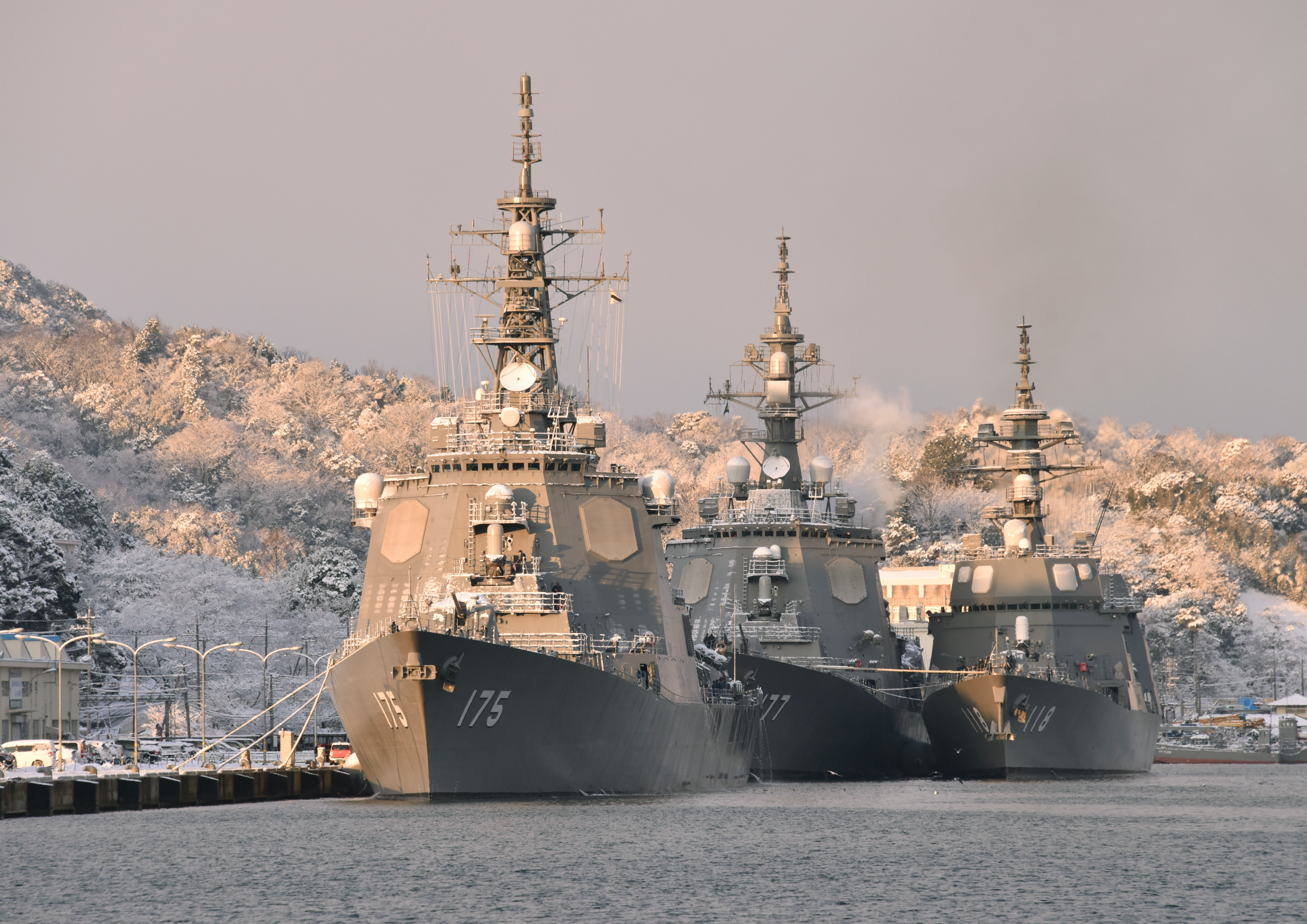

Site information
- Type: Naval base
- Owner: Japanese Maritime Self-Defense Force
- Operator: Japan Maritime Self-Defense Force
- Website: www.mod.go.jp/msdf/maizuru/

Location
- Location within Japan
- Coordinates: 35°28′29″N 135°22′17″E

Site history
- Built: 1 August 1952
- In use: 1952

Garrison information
- Occupants: Self Defense Fleet; Communications Command; Maizuru District Force

The Maizuru Naval Base (Japanese: 舞鶴基地, Hepburn: Maidzuru Kichi), also simply known as the JMSDF Maizuru Naval Base, is a group of ports and land facilities of the Japan Maritime Self-Defense Force (JMSDF), which are scattered in multiple districts of Maizuru City, Kansai region, and where the Maizuru District Force, etc. are located. It is not officially called a base, but it is used as a common name.

== Background ==
In the Meiji era strategy against Russia, the Japanese Navy had a long-cherished desire to establish a military base for the Navy on the Sea of Japan side, and in 1889, the bay mouth was narrow and suitable for defense. In 1901, a guardian office was set up in Maizuru by setting a white arrow in Maizuru Bay, which was a good terrain for a military port because the waves were quiet in the bay and many ships could berth. It is located at Maizuru Port (Maizuru East Port), which has been used as a military port since the opening of the Imperial Japanese Navy's Maizuru Naval District.

Before World War II, the Imperial Japanese Navy Maizuru Naval District was located, but in normal times no battleships were placed, and it was closed during the Washington Naval Treaty, so it was neglected in terms of operation compared to other guardian offices. Many relatively old ships were deployed before and after the war, but in recent years it has been reviewed as the most important base on the Sea of Japan side, and two missile boats and the Sea of Japan to prepare for the activities of North Korean-registered craft ships. Due to its strategic importance, two Aegis ships were also deployed in sequence. Recently, the adjacent large wave bunker facility has been expanded. It is being strengthened as the only base of the Maritime Self-Defense Force on the Sea of Japan side, with a vast defensive range from the border between Shimane and Yamaguchi prefectures to the border between Akita and Aomori prefectures.

The main port of the Maizuru District Force, which is in charge of most of the security on the Sea of Japan side, as well as the 3rd Escort Squadron of the 3rd Escort Flotilla, etc. are their home ports.

== History ==
On 1 August 1952, the Maizuru District Force was newly established at the same time as the National Safety Agency Coastal Security Force was established. On 10 November, the Maizuru District Force moves from Matsugasaki to Yobe. Then on 27 December, Maizuru Training Corps was a new edition. Maizuru and Niigata route enlightenment teams were abolished.

On 16 September 1953, new edition of Maizuru Base Guard.

On 28 December 1954, the Self-Defense Forces Maizuru Hospital was opened.

On 1 May 1955, the new edition of Maizuru Communication Corps.

On 10 May 1957, it was renamed from Maizuru Training Corps to Maizuru Education Corps.

On 1 February 1961, new editions includes the Maizuru Supply Station, Maizuru Factory and Maizuru Torai Coordination Station.

On 20 March 1962, new edition of the Maizuru Defense Force and was later renamed from Maizuru Base Guard to Maizuru Guard.

On 2 March 1970, new editions of Maizuru Zoushusho and Maizuru Medic. Maizuru workshop was abolished.

On 1 October 1975, the Maritime Self-Defense Force 4th Technical School opens.

On 11 May 1976, new edition of Maizuru Ongakutai.

On 27 December 1977, a new Underwater Explosive Disposal Unit was added to the Maizuru Defense Force.

On 1 July 1985, the Maizuru torpedo maintenance station was a new edition. Maizuru torpedo adjustment station was abolished.

On 1 July 1987, the Maizuru Defense Force was abolished and reorganization of the guard took place. New edition of Maizuru Base Business Corps.

On 8 December 1998, the Maizuru Supply Station and Maizuru Repair Station were integrated and reorganized into Maizuru Repair Supply Station due to organizational restructuring of the supply and maintenance department, and Maizuru Torai Maintenance Center was changed to Maizuru Ammunition Maintenance and Supply Reorganized into Tokoro.

In late March 2021, with the strengthening of the functions of the Self-Defense Forces Yokosuka Hospital, the Self-Defense Forces Maizuru Hospital would be abolished and reduced to a clinic.

== Facilities and operational units ==
- Maizuru District Force
  - Maizuru District General Manager
  - Maizuru Repair Supply Station
  - Maizuru Guard
  - Maizuru Ammunition Maintenance Supply Station
  - Maizuru Education Corps
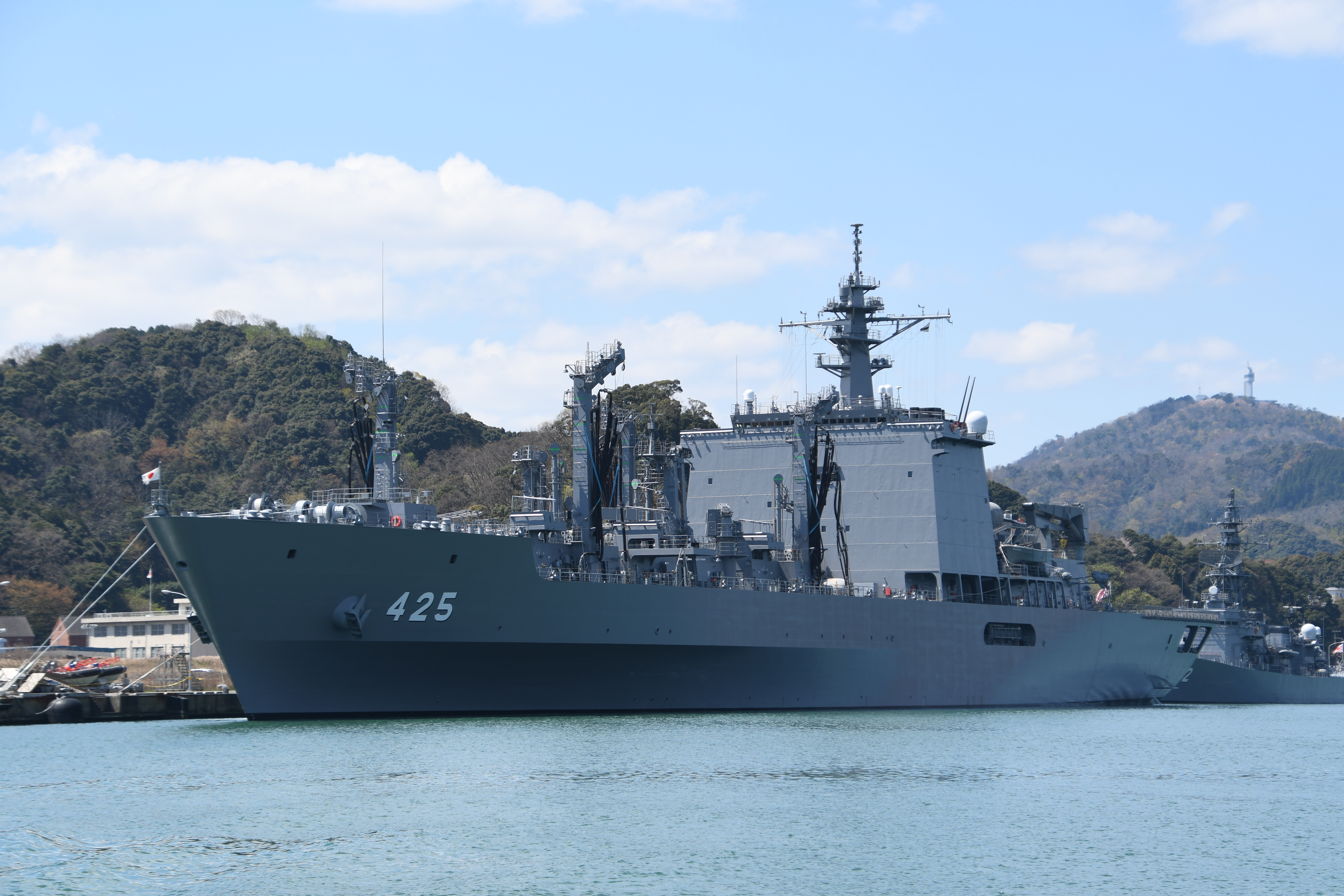
  - JS Mashū moored at Maizuru Naval Base
    Maizuru Music Corps
  - Maizuru Medic
  - Maizuru Base Operations Corps
  - 44th Mine Warfare Force
- Fleet Escort Force
  - 3rd Escort Squadron
  - 14th Escort Squadron
  - 1st Replenishment-at-Sea Squadron
  - Fleet Training Command
- Communications Command
- JMSDF Criminal Investigation Command
- JMSDF 4th Technical School
- JMSDF Maizuru Hospital
- Kinki Chubu Defense Bureau
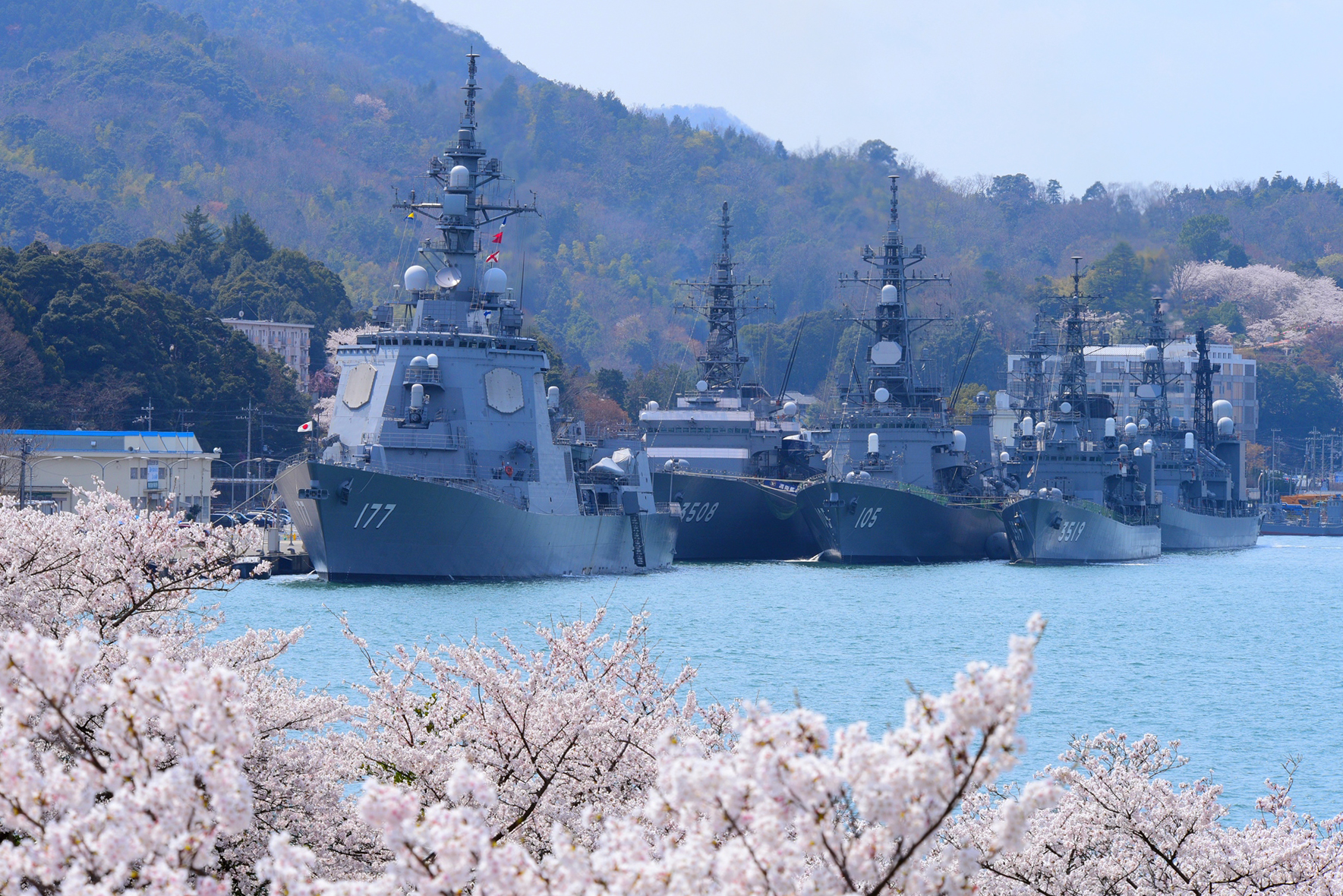
3rd Escort Flotilla at Maizuru Naval Base

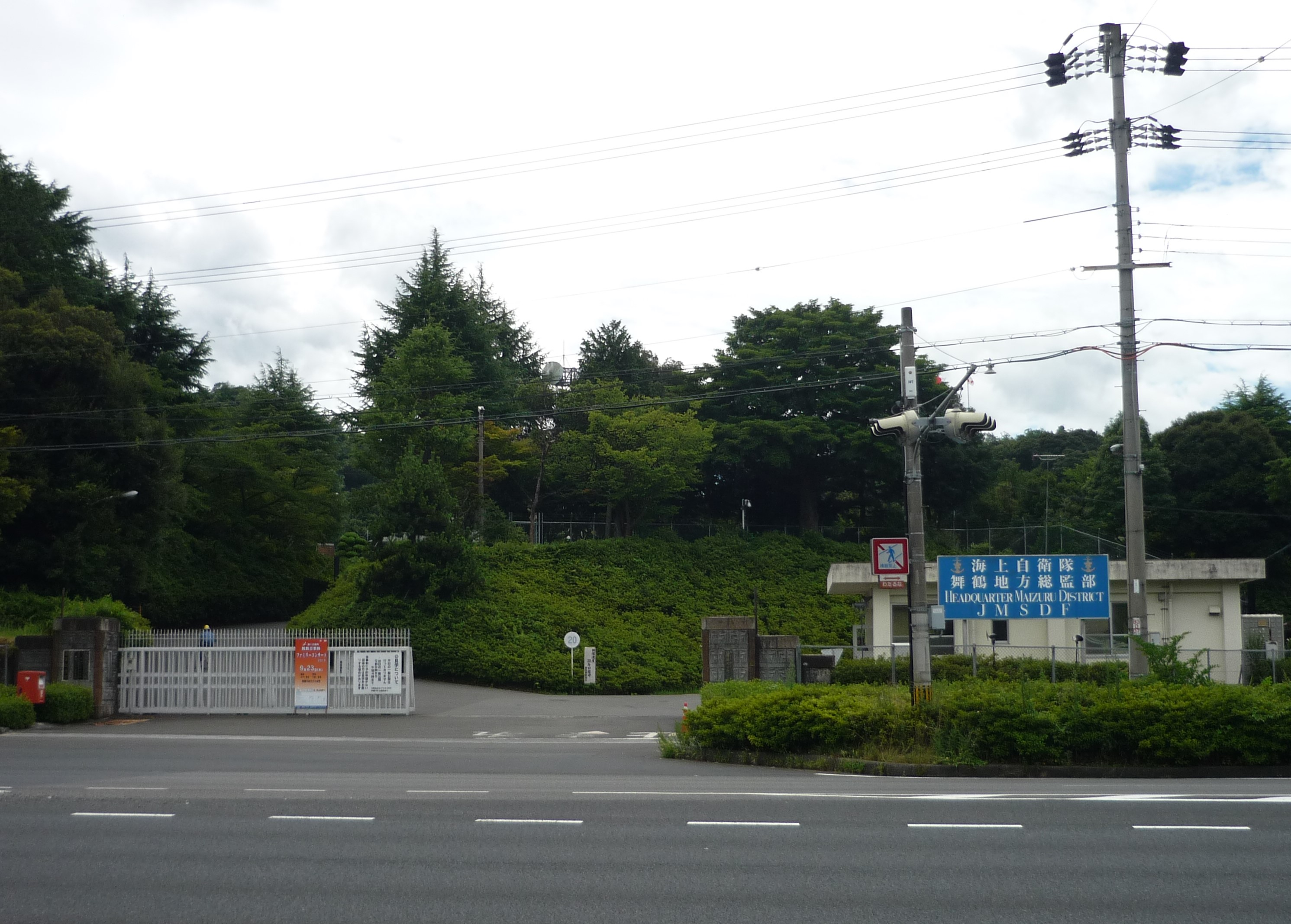
Gate to Maizuru Naval BAse

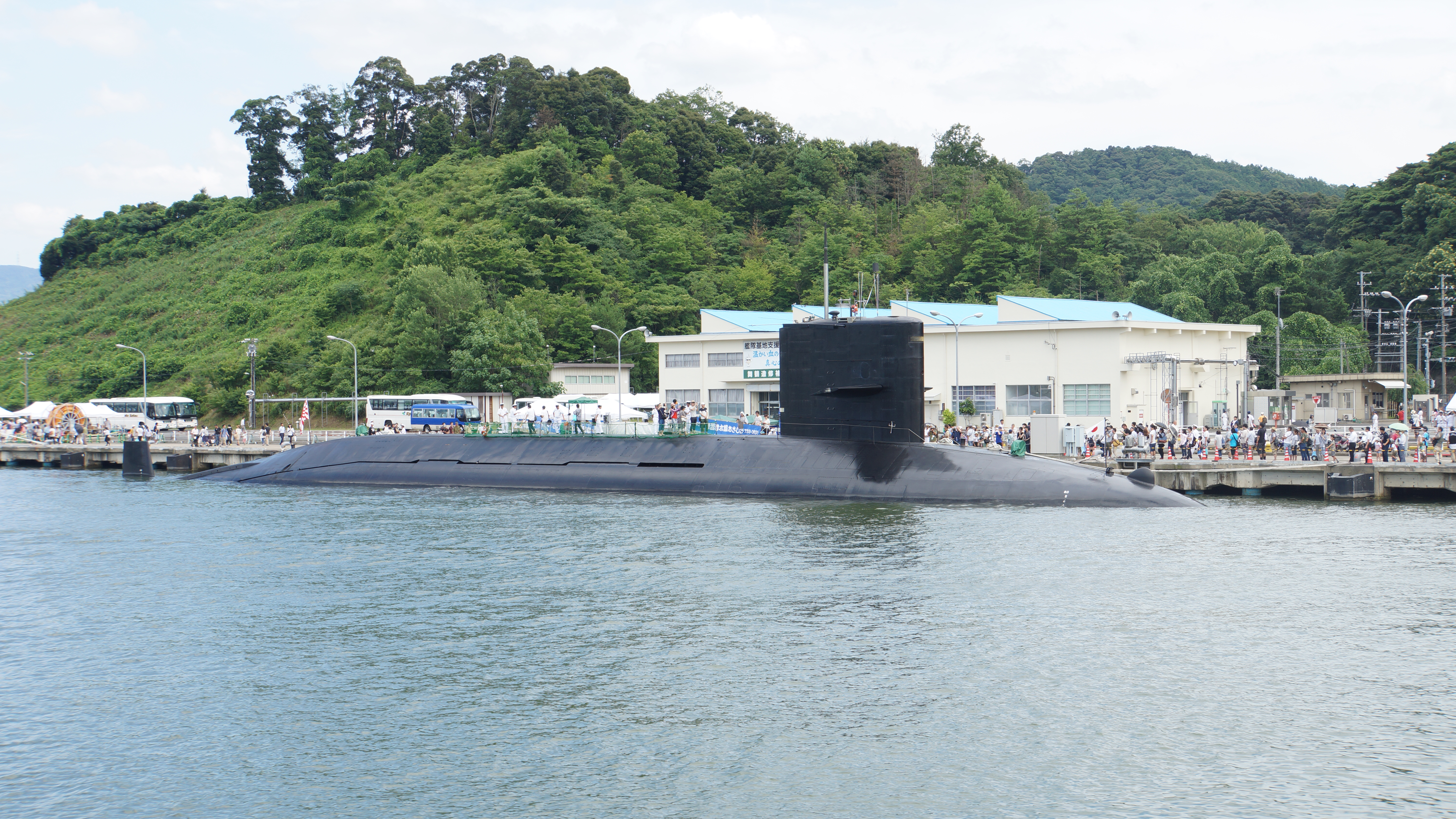
JS Asashio at Maizuru Naval Base

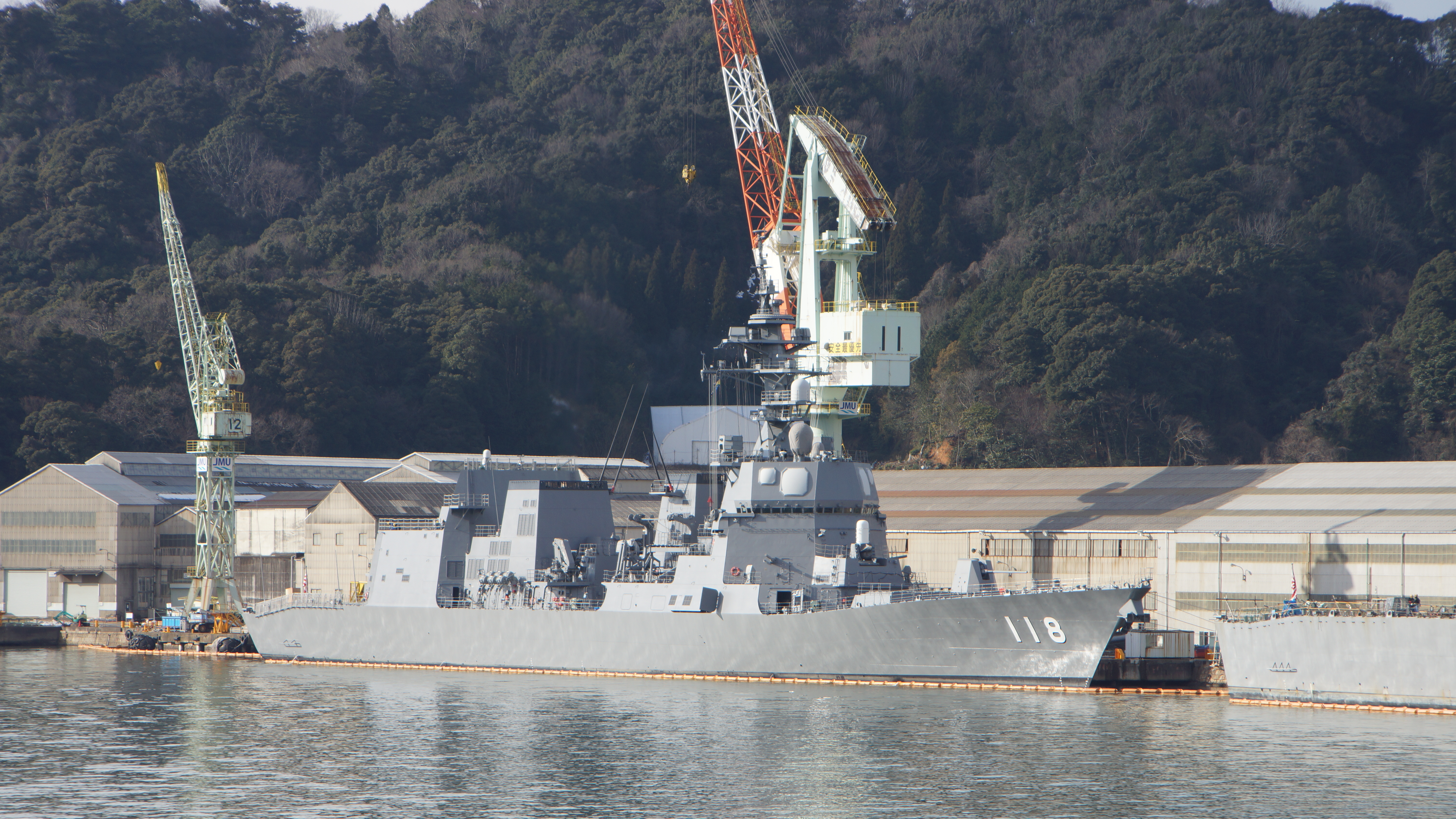
JS Fuyuzuki at JMU Maizuru Shipyard

== Maizuru Air Base ==
Maizuru Air Field 舞鶴航空基地
- IATA: none; ICAO: RJBM

Summary
- Airport type: Military
- Interactive map of Maizuru Air Field

Runways
Direction	Length		Surface
Direction	m	ft	Surface
04/22	600	1,969	Concrete
- Source: Japanese AIP at AIS Japan

The Maizuru Air Base (Japanese: 舞鶴航空基地, Hepburn: Maidzuru Kōkūkichi), also simply known as the JMSDF Maizuru Air Base, or JMSDF Maizuru Air Station, is the only air base on the Sea of Japan side of the Maritime Self-Defense Force, and the need to strengthen its defense system was called for in preparation for the darkening of North Korean craft ships. However, because there was no Maritime Self-Defense Force air base nearby, the aircraft of the escort vessels belonging to the 3rd escort group whose home port is Maizuru Port are flying from Tateyama Air Base (Chiba Prefecture) each time. It was pointed out that "Maizuru is a defective base".

Therefore, the Maritime Self-Defense Force made a plan to develop a runway, control tower, hangar, etc. on a site of about 220,000 m^{2} in the Nagahama District of Maizuru City, and started construction in 1996. Completed on 22 March 2001, the Maizuru Air Division under the control of the 123rd Air Corps of the 21st Fleet Air Group was initially formed, and six patrol helicopters SH-60J were stationed there. On 26 March 2008, the Maizuru Air Division was upgraded, the 23rd Air Group was newly formed under the 21st Air Group, and the number of patrol helicopters was increased to 12 (SH-60J / K). The defense system on the Sea of Japan side will be strengthened.

On 24 March 2001, Maizuru Airfield completed and the Maizuru Air Detachment, Maizuru Maintenance and Supply Detachment and Maizuru Air Base Detachment were newly added to the 123rd Air Group of the 21st Air Group.

In February 2002, dispatched to the Indian Ocean under the Anti-Terrorism Special Measures Law (patrol helicopter mounted on an escort ship). Since then, dispatched a total of 4 times. On 3 April, dispatched to a disaster for a tanker sinking accident. Conducted a survey of oil diffusion on the sea surface.

In October 2004, dispatched a disaster to the flood damage of the Yura River caused by Typhoon Vicente in 2004. SH-60J and others belonging to this base rescued passengers left behind on the roof of a submerged sightseeing bus. Disaster dispatch for the 2004 Chūetsu earthquake that occurred on 23 October.

In August 2006, Defense Agency decides to upgrade Maizuru Air Detachment to Air Corps.

In 2007, disaster dispatch for the Noto Peninsula earthquake that occurred on 25 March. Conducted damage situation reconnaissance. Disaster dispatch for the Mie-ken Chubu Earthquake that occurred on 15 April. Conducted damage situation reconnaissance. Dispatched to the Niigata Chuetsu-oki Earthquake that occurred on 16 July. Conducted damage situation reconnaissance and transportation of personnel and relief supplies.

On 23 January 2008, transport of emergency cases of burns from Maizuru to Kanazawa (Request for dispatch of disaster due to helicopter inability to fly). On 12 February, rescue of fallen people from fishing rafts in Maizuru Bay. On 3 March, search for distressed fishing boats off Kyogamisaki. 26 March: Maizuru Air Detachment abolished. The 23rd Air Corps was newly released under the 21st Air Group. Increased the number of resident helicopters from 6 to 12. 20 May: Search for victims of personal watercraft capsizing. From 6 to 7 December, search for missing persons while surfing off Takahama, Fukui Prefecture.

From 6 July to 29 November 2009, dispatch of a countermeasure unit for pirates off the coast of Somalia under the Act on Punishment of Piracy and Countermeasures against Piracy (escort-based aircraft). Since then, as of January 2020, dispatched a total of 5 times. On 23 July, dispatched to a disaster in response to a rotorcraft distress in the Tajima region of Hyogo prefecture. Conducted a search for distressed aircraft. On 3 September SH-60K begins to be deployed to the 23rd Air Corps. On 2 November, search for anglers in distress at Fukui Port.

From 11 March to 31 August 2011, SH-60J / SH-60K was dispatched to the Great East Japan Earthquake that occurred on 11 March (escort carrier-based aircraft).

On 12 March 2015, the 23rd Air Group has completed the operation of SH-60J.

From 22 April to 4 May 2016, dispatched to the Kumamoto earthquake that occurred on 14 April. Participated as a member of the bathing support unit in the disaster area.

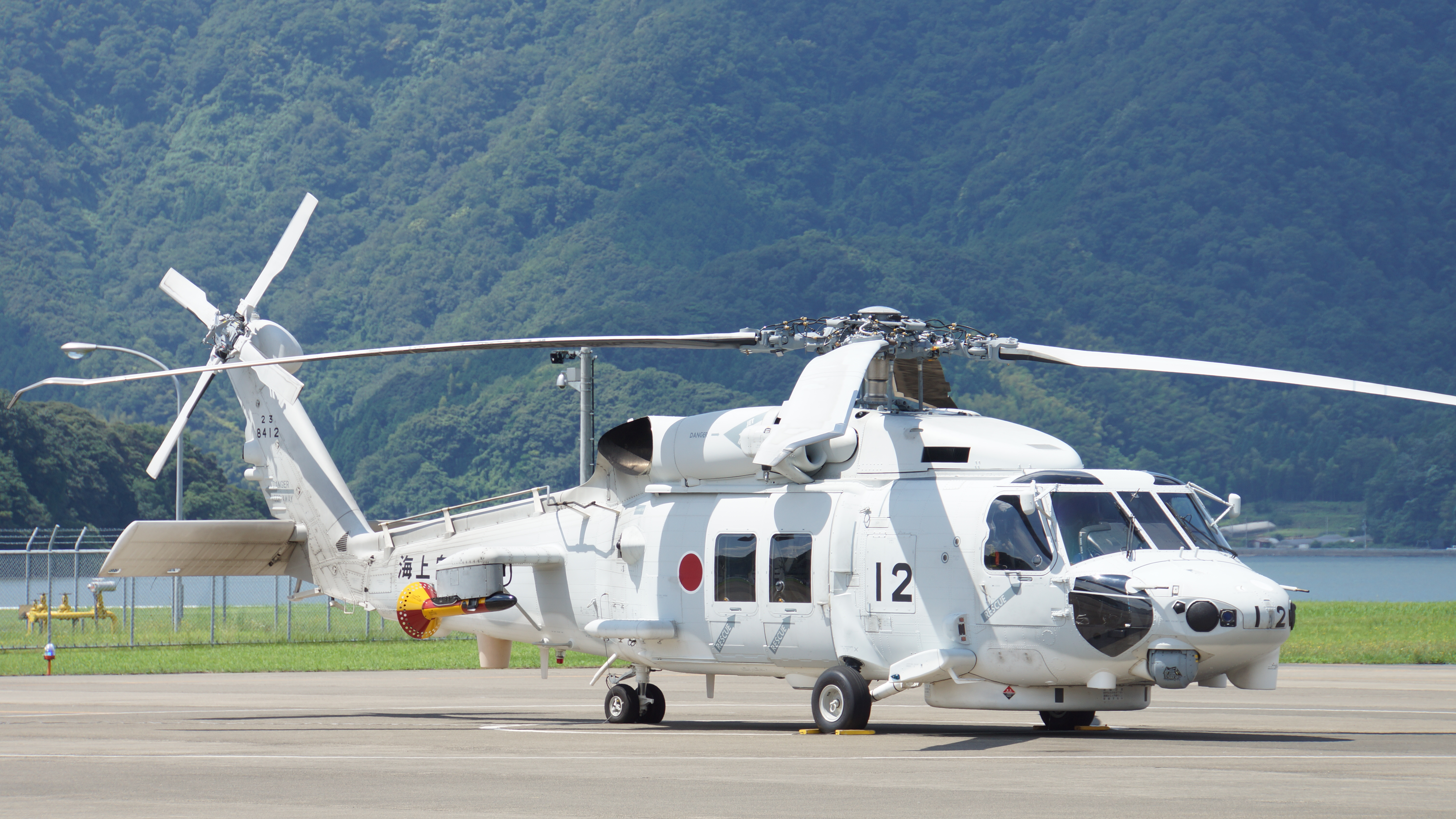
SH-60K at Maizuru Air Station

== See also ==
- JMSDF Ōminato Naval Base
- JMSDF Yokosuka Naval Base
