= JS Jinryū =

2014 Sōryū-class submarine

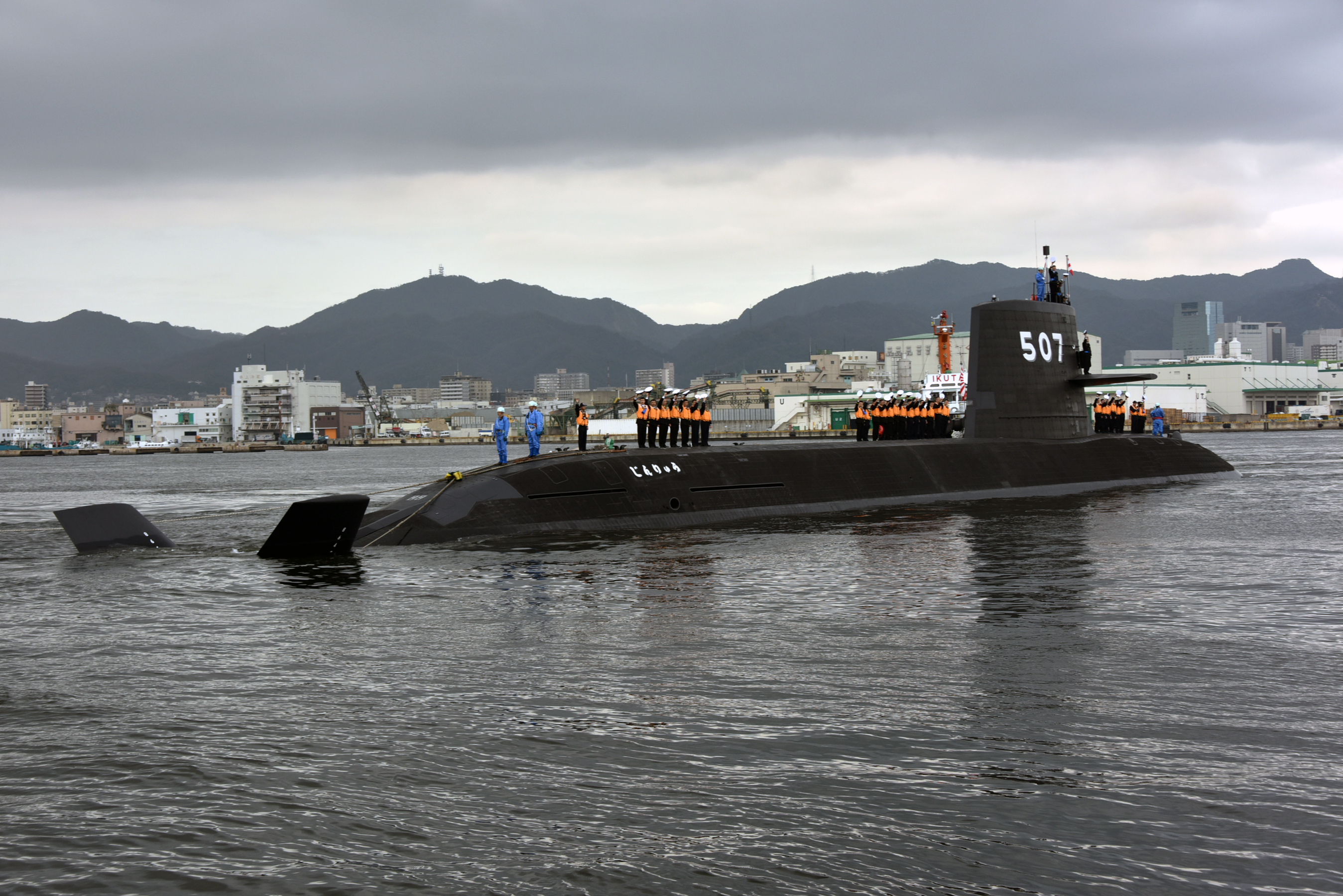
- JS Jinryū

History

Japan
- Name: Jinryū; (じんりゅう)
- Namesake: Benevolent dragon (仁龍)
- Ordered: 2011
- Builder: Mitsubishi Heavy Industries
- Cost: ¥64.3 billion
- Laid down: 14 February 2012
- Launched: 8 October 2014
- Commissioned: 7 March 2016
- Home port: Kure
- Identification: SS-507
- Status: Active

General characteristics
- Class & type: Sōryū-class attack submarine
- Displacement: Surfaced: 2,900 tonnes (2,854 long tons); Submerged: 4,200 t (4,134 long tons)
- Length: 84.0 m (275 ft 7 in)
- Beam: 9.1 m (29 ft 10 in)
- Draught: 8.5 m (27 ft 11 in)
- Propulsion: 1-shaft 2× Kawasaki 12V 25/25 SB-type diesel engines diesel-electric; 4× Kawasaki Kockums V4-275R Stirling engines; 3,900 hp (2,900 kW) surfaced; 8,000 hp (6,000 kW) submerged
- Speed: Surfaced: 13 kn (24 km/h; 15 mph); Submerged: 20 kn (37 km/h; 23 mph)
- Range: AIP endurance (est.): 6,100 nautical miles (11,300 km; 7,000 mi) at 6.5 knots (12.0 km/h; 7.5 mph)
- Complement: 65 (9 officers, 56 enlisted)
- Sensors & processing systems: ZPS-6F surface/low-level air search radar; Hughes/Oki ZQQ-7 Sonar suite: 1× bow-array, 4× LF flank arrays and 1× Towed array sonar
- Electronic warfare & decoys: ZLR-3-6 ESM equipment; 2× 3-inch underwater countermeasure launcher tubes for launching of Acoustic Device Countermeasures (ADCs)
- Armament: 6 × HU-606 21 in (533 mm) torpedo tubes with 30 reloads for: 1.) Type 89 torpedo; 2.) Harpoon (missile); Mines

JS Jinryū (SS-507) is the seventh boat of Sōryū-class submarines, operated by the Japan Maritime Self-Defense Force. She was commissioned on 7 March 2016.

== Construction and career ==
Jinryū was laid down at Mitsubishi Heavy Industries Kobe Shipyard on January 21, 2011, as the 2011 plan 2900-ton submarine No. 8122 based on the medium-term defense capability development plan. At the launching ceremony, it was named Jinryū and launched on 8 October 2014. She was commissioned on 7 March 2016 and deployed to Kure.

The homeport of Jinryū is Kure.

The ship participated in the Japan-India Maritime Exercise (JAIMEX-25) with INS Sahyadri of the Indian Navy between 16 and 18 October 2025. Other Japanese ships, including Asahi and Ōmi, also participated in the exercise. Sahyadri was on an operational deployment to the South China Sea and the Indo-Pacific and conducted a port call at the Yokosuka Naval Base.

== Gallery ==
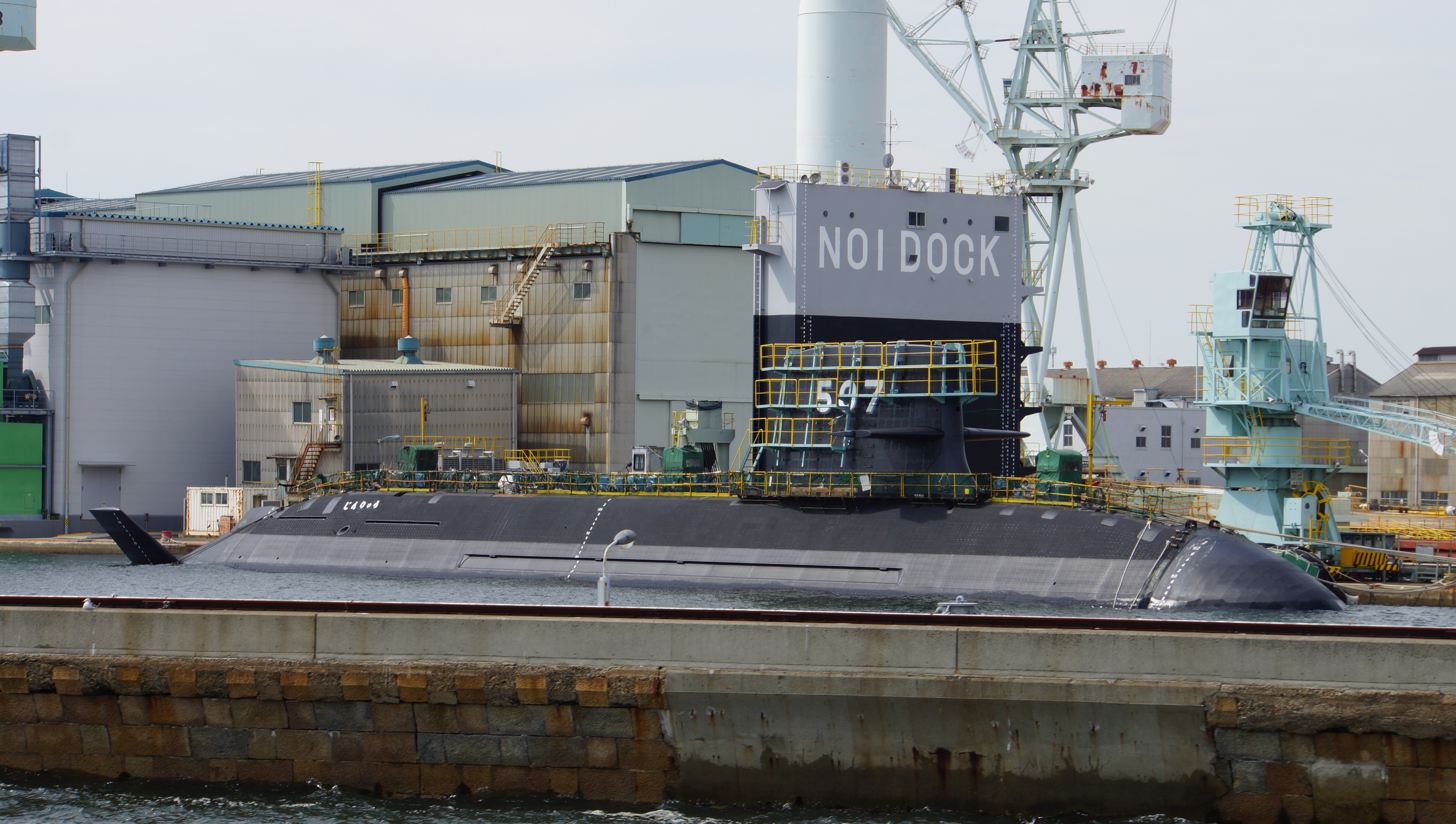
JS Jinryū at Kobe on 11 October 2014.

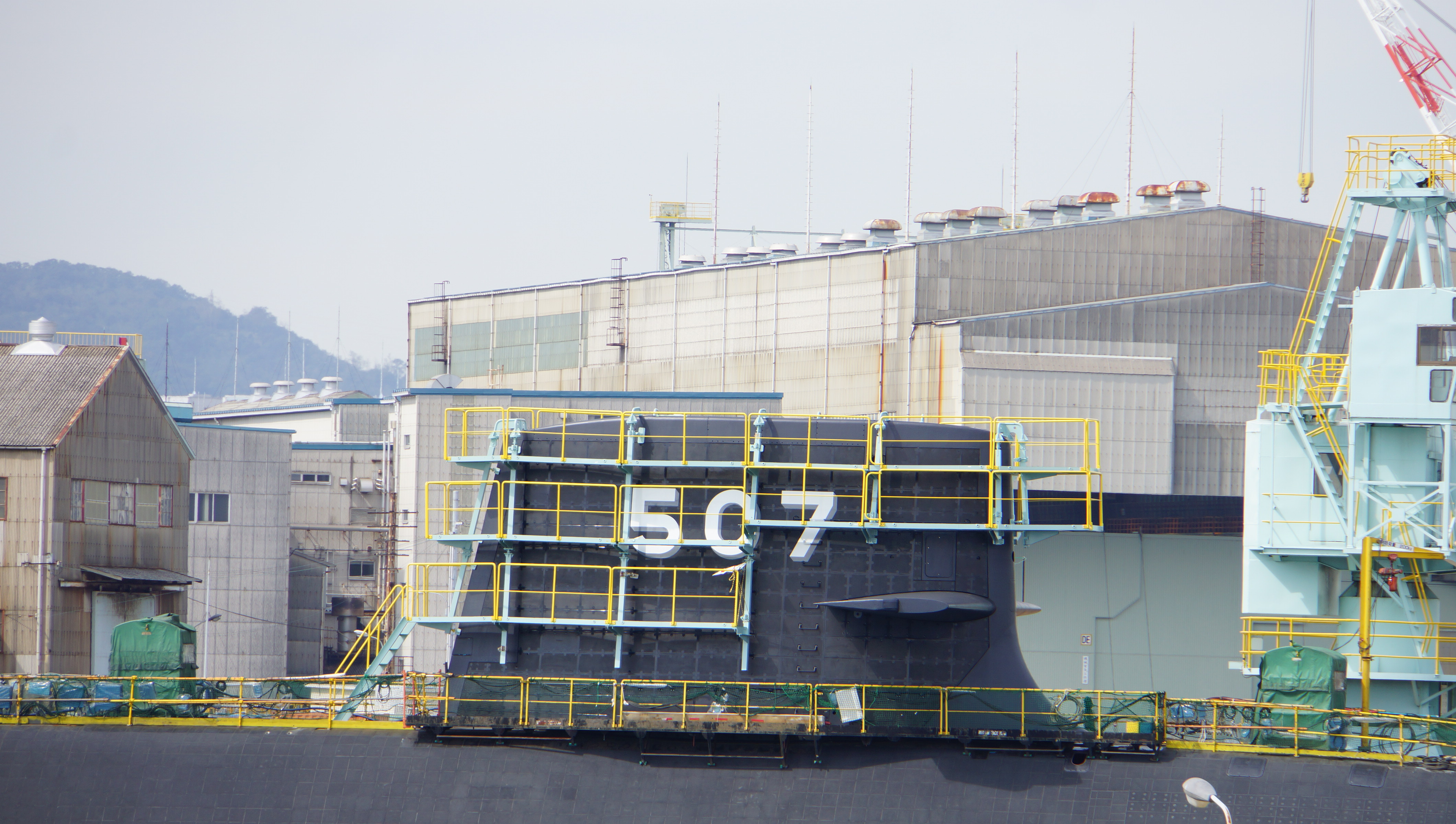
JS Jinryū at Kobe on 11 October 2014.

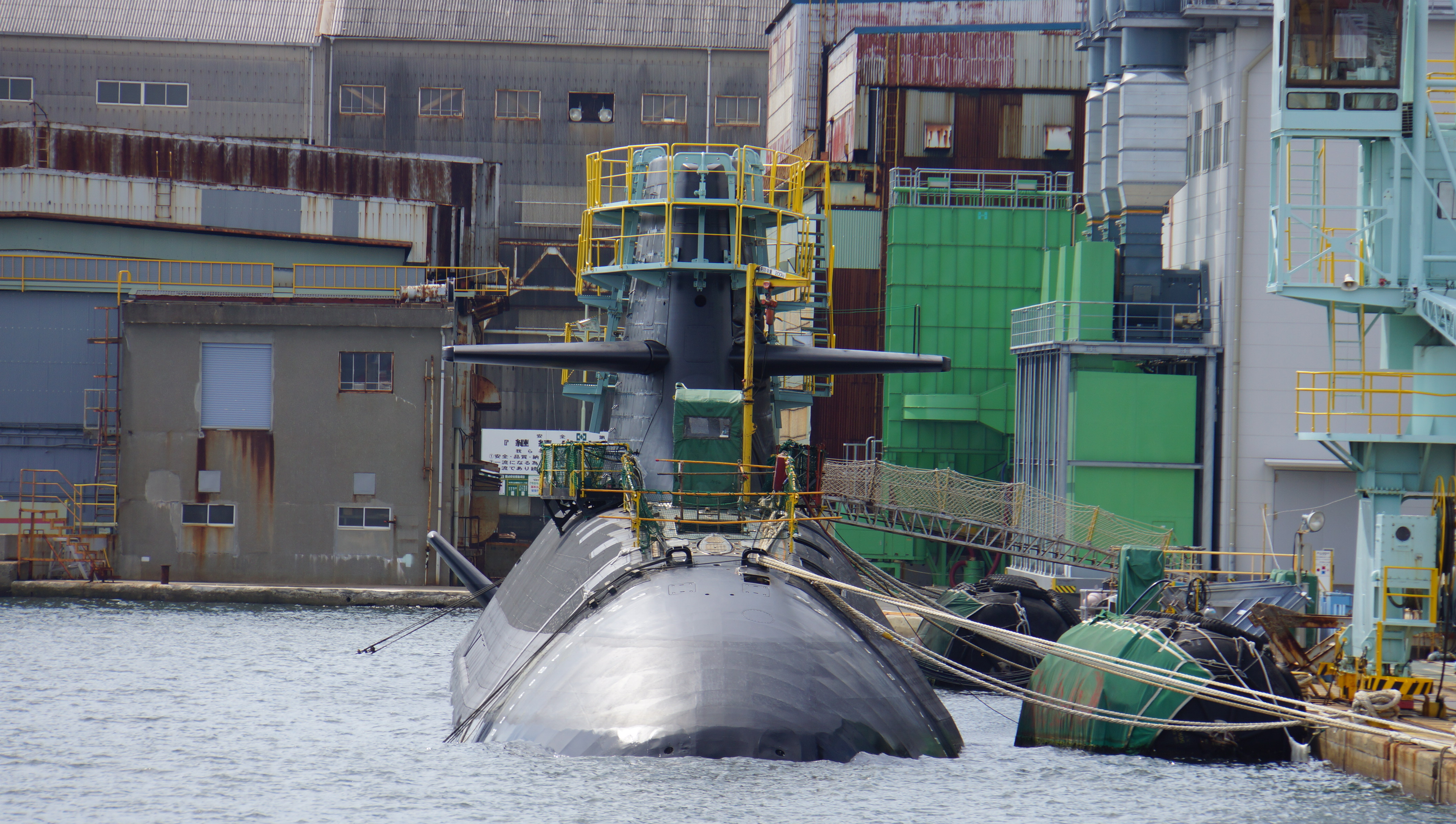
JS Jinryū at Kobe on 11 October 2014.
