= JS Ōmi =

Mashū-class replenishment ship

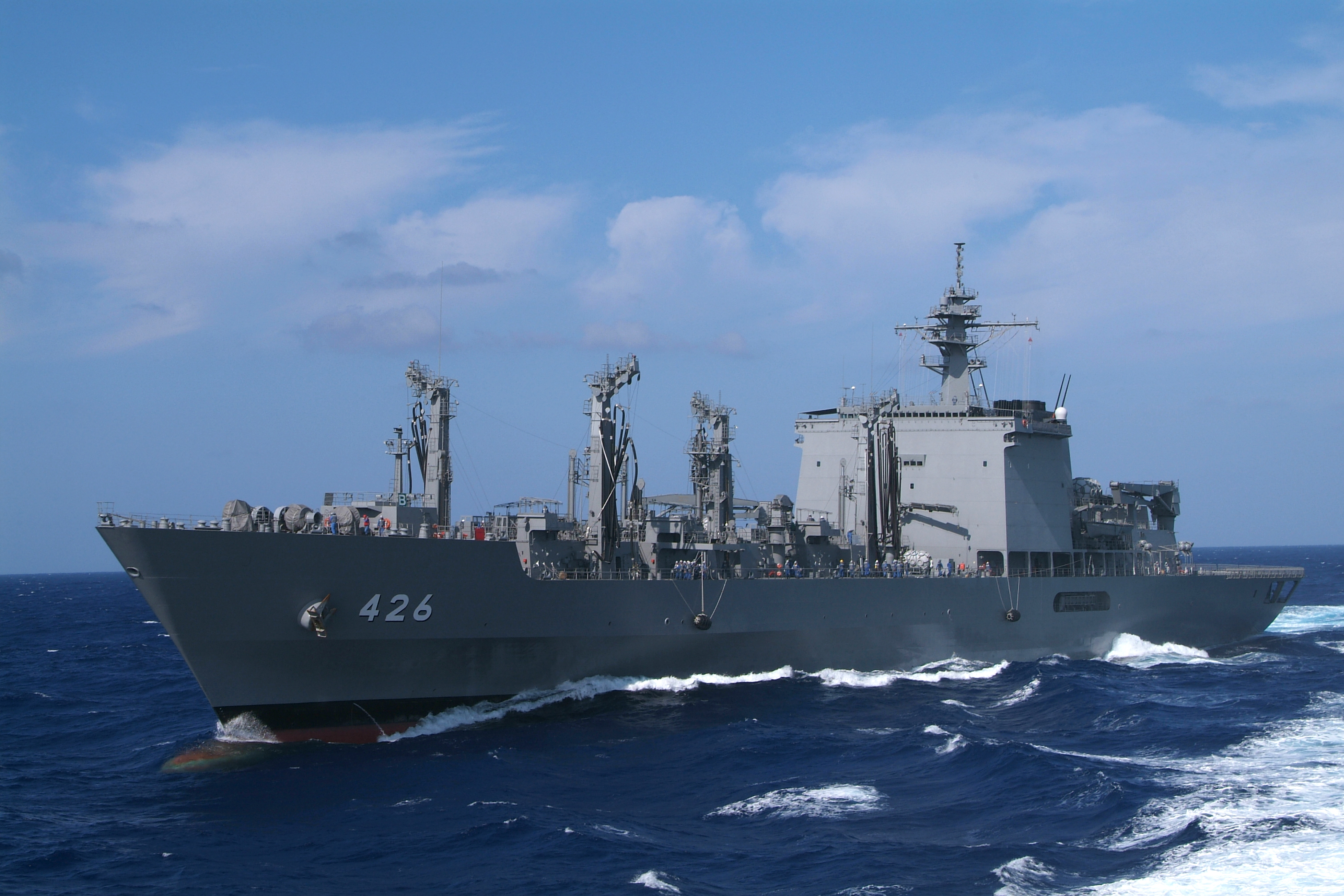
- JS Ōmi in January 2017.

History

Japan
- Name: Ōmi; (おうみ)
- Namesake: Lake Ōmi
- Owner: Japan Maritime Self-Defense Force
- Builder: Hitachi Shipbuilding Corporation, Maizuru Ishikawajima-Harima Heavy Industries, Tokyo
- Laid down: 7 February 2003
- Launched: 19 February 2004
- Commissioned: 3 April 2006
- Home port: Yokosuka
- Identification: Pennant number: AOE-426
- Status: Active

General characteristics
- Class & type: Mashū-class replenishment ship
- Displacement: 13,500 tonnes standard
- Length: 221 m (725 ft 1 in)
- Beam: 27.0 m (88 ft 7 in)
- Draught: 8.0 m (26 ft 3 in)
- Propulsion: 2 × Kawasaki Rolls-Royce Spey SM1C gas turbines; 40,000 shp (29,828 kW) each; 2 × shafts
- Speed: 24 knots (44 km/h; 28 mph)
- Range: 9,500 nmi (17,594 km; 10,932 mi) at 20 knots (37 km/h; 23 mph)
- Complement: 150
- Sensors & processing systems: OPS-28 Surface Search RDF; OPS-20 Navigation RDF
- Electronic warfare & decoys: NOLR-8 RDF Interceptor; Mk.137 decoy launchers
- Armament: 2 × Phalanx CIWS
- Aircraft carried: 1 × helicopter
- Aviation facilities: Helicopter deck and enclosed hangar

Ōmi (AOE-426) is the second ship of the Mashū-class replenishment ships of the Japanese Maritime Self-Defense Force. She was commissioned on 3 April 2006.

== Construction and career ==
She was laid down on 7 February 2003 and launched on 19 February 2004. Commissioned on 3 April 2006 with the hull number AOE-426.

The ship participated in the Japan-India Maritime Exercise (JAIMEX-25) with INS Sahyadri of the Indian Navy between 16 and 18 October 2025. Other Japanese ships, including Asahi and Jinryū, also participated in the exercise. Sahyadri was on an operational deployment to the South China Sea and the Indo-Pacific and conducted a port call at the Yokosuka Naval Base.

== Gallery ==
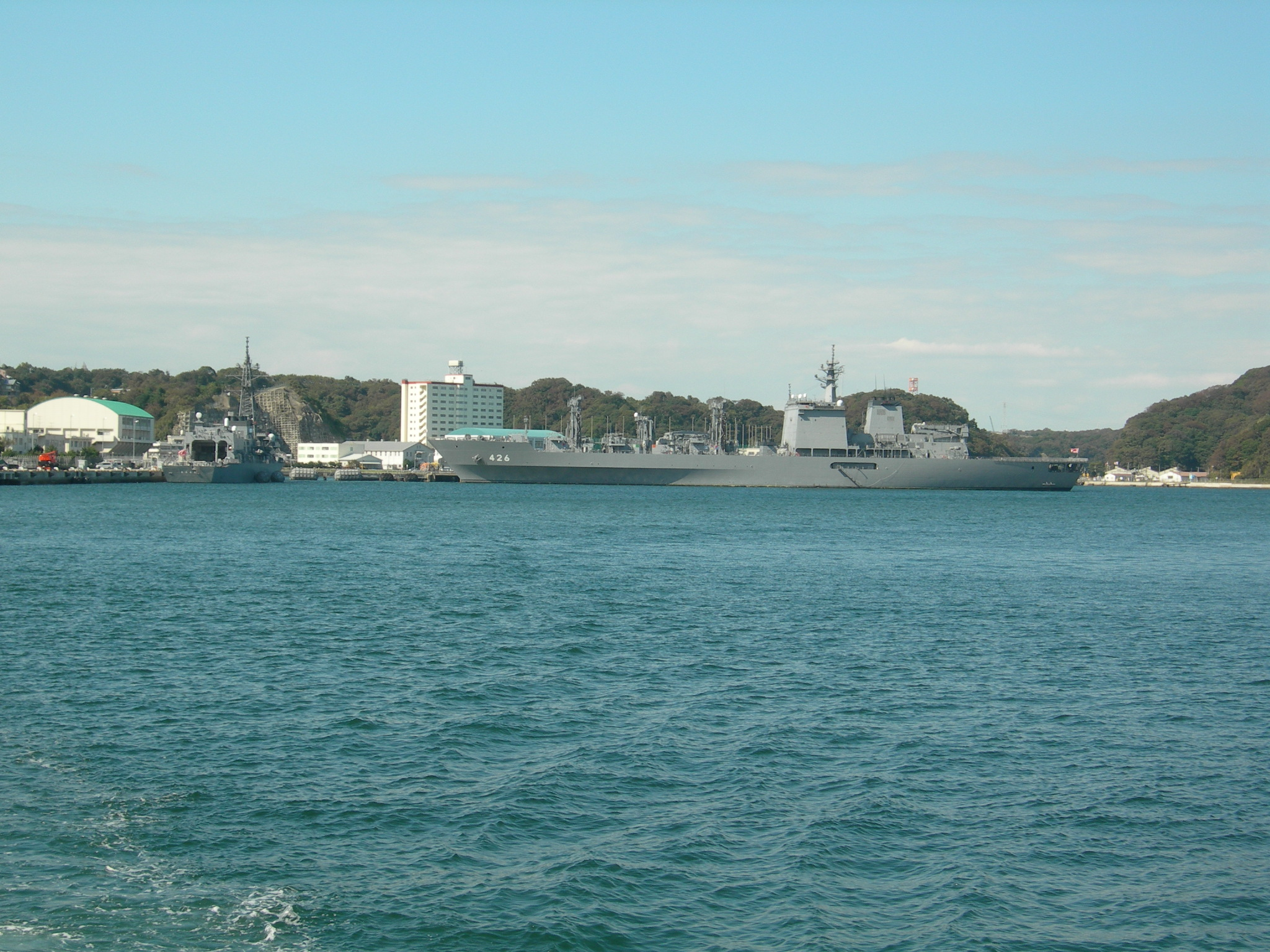
JS Ōmi and JS Murasame at Yokosuka on 26 October 2011.

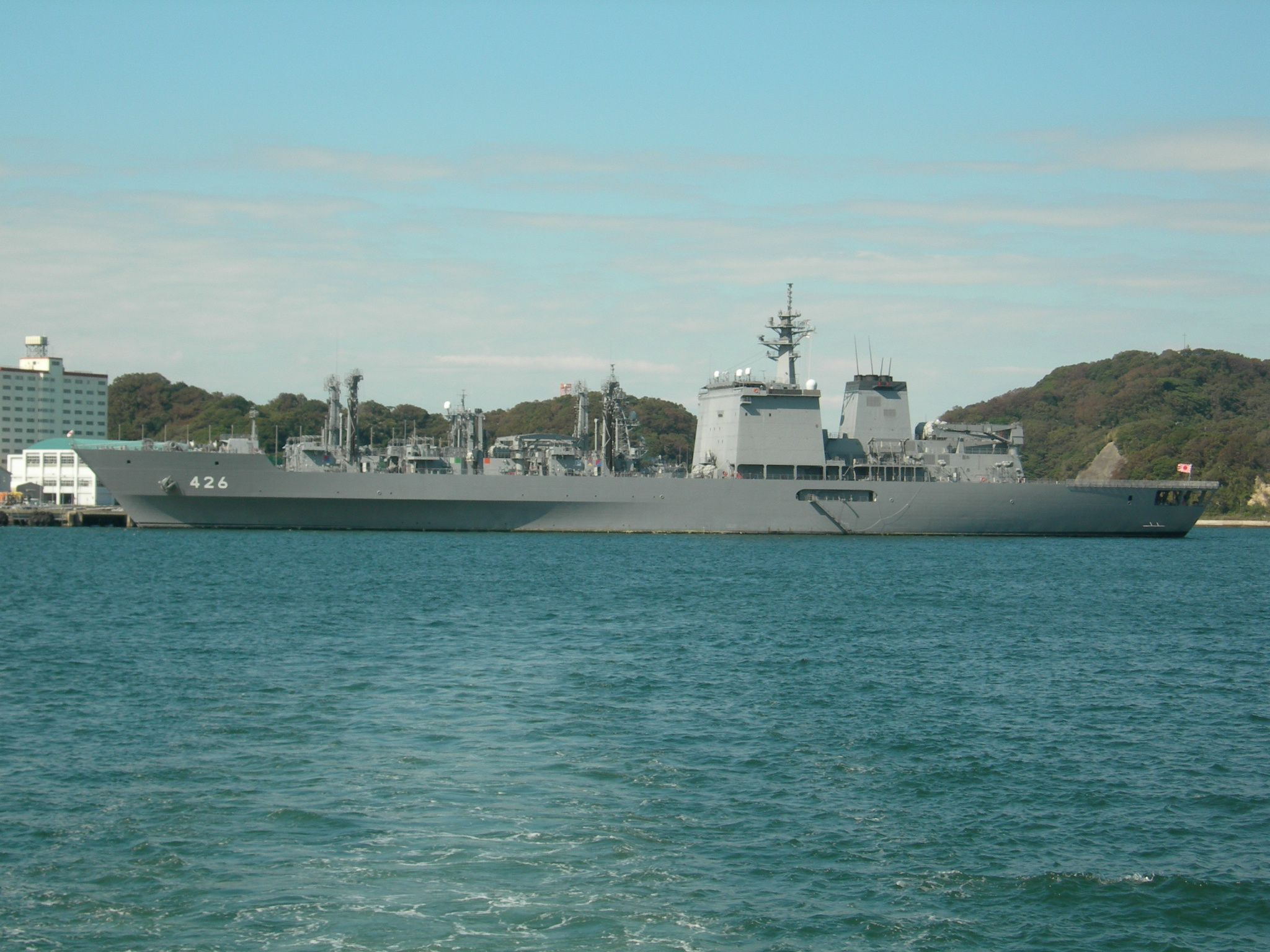
JS Ōmi at Yokosuka on 26 October 2011.

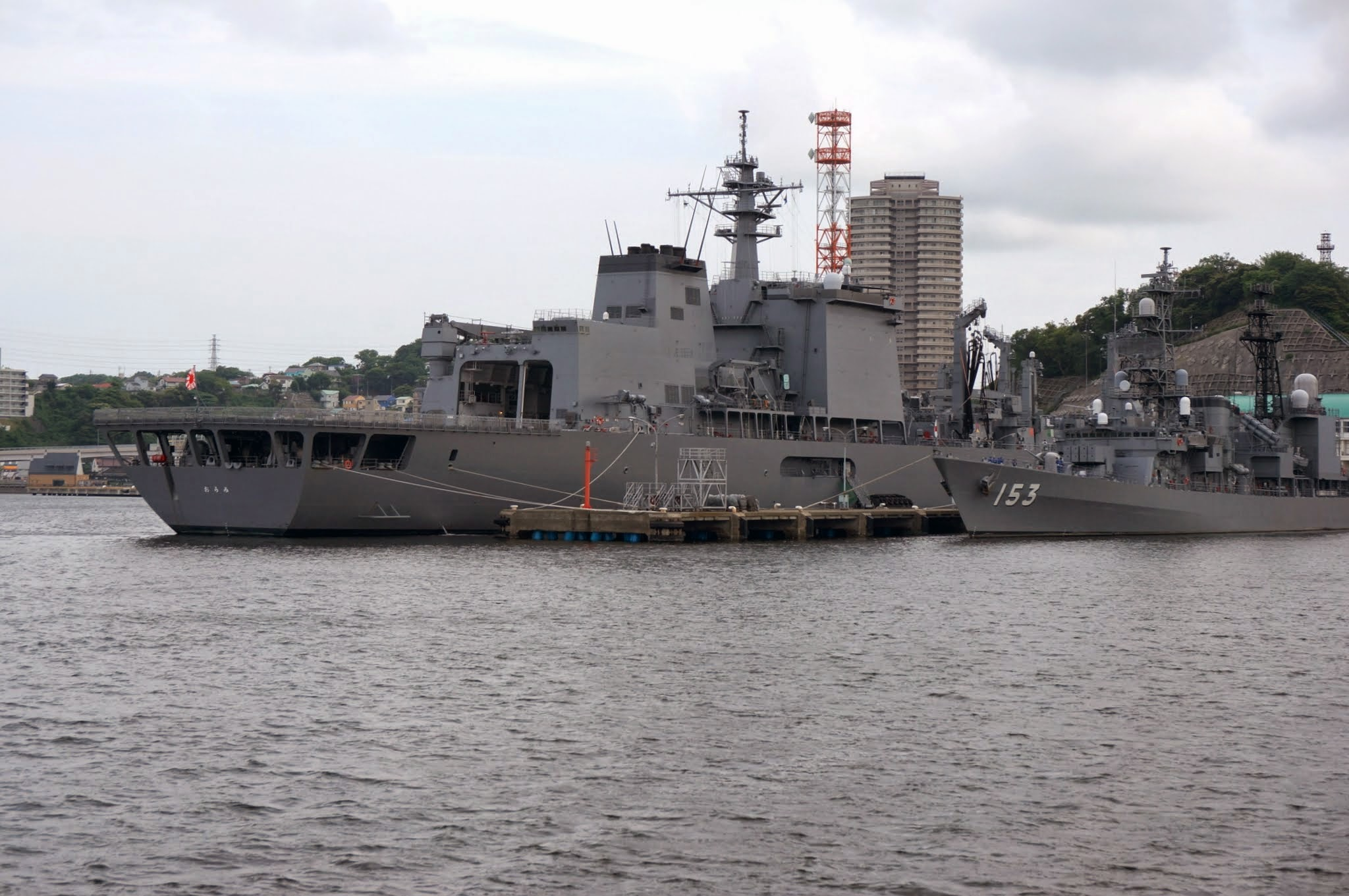
JS Ōmi and JS Yūgiri at Yokosuka on 18 May 2015.

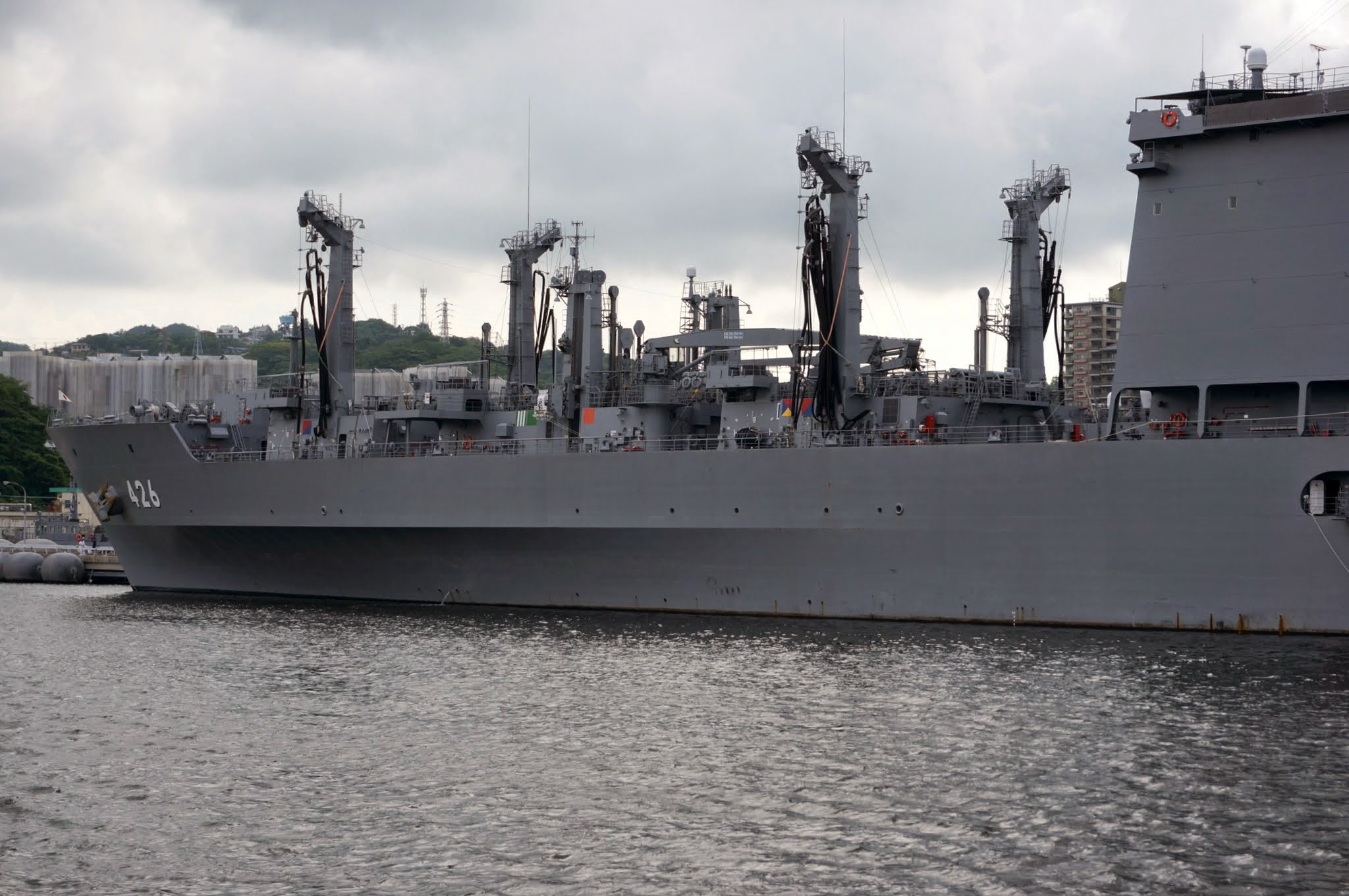
JS Ōmi at Yokosuka on 18 May 2015.

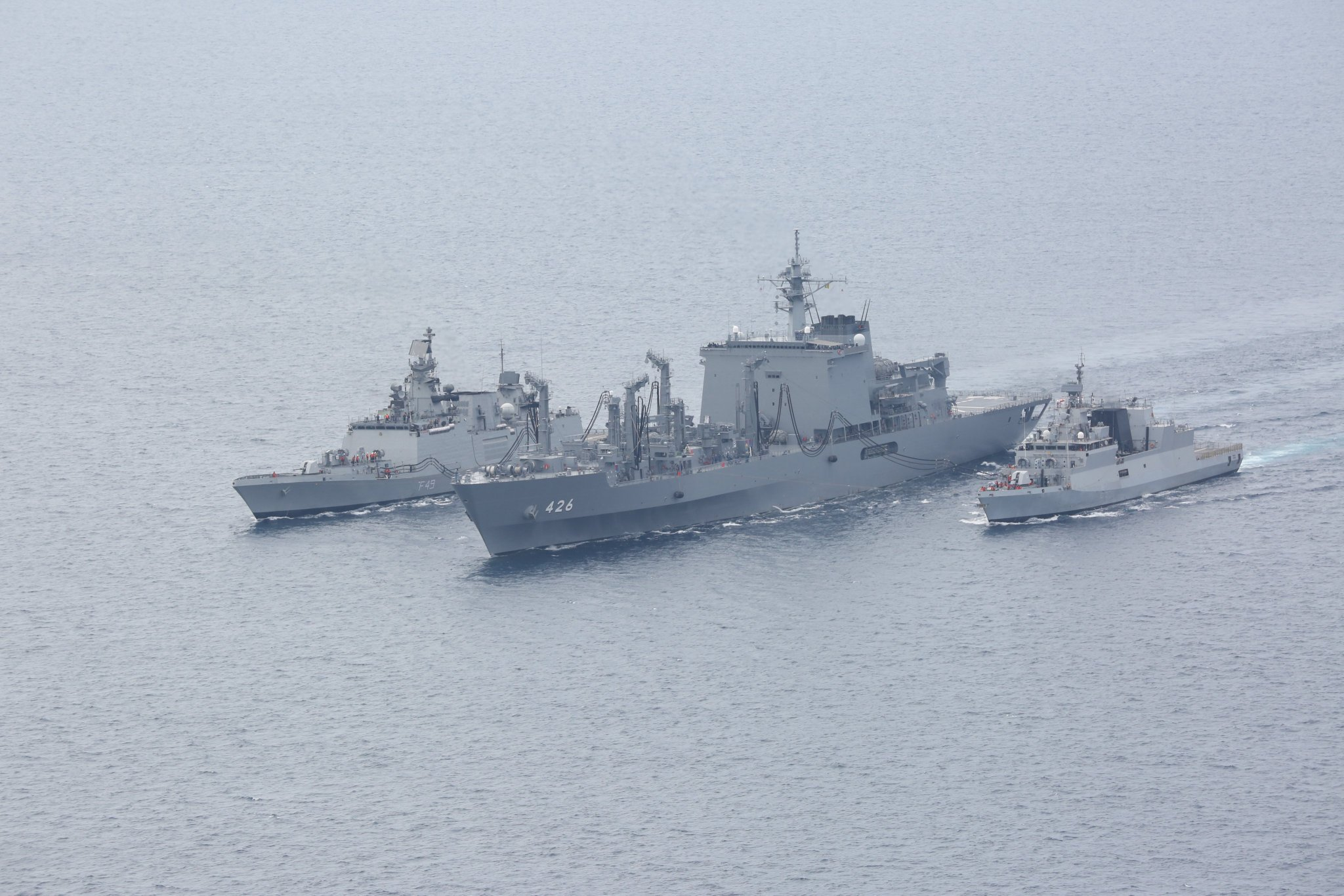
JS Ōmi along with INS Sahyadri and a Kamorta-class corvette during a Malabar exercise.
