= USS Anzio (CG-68) =

Decommissioned Ticonderoga-class guided missile cruiser

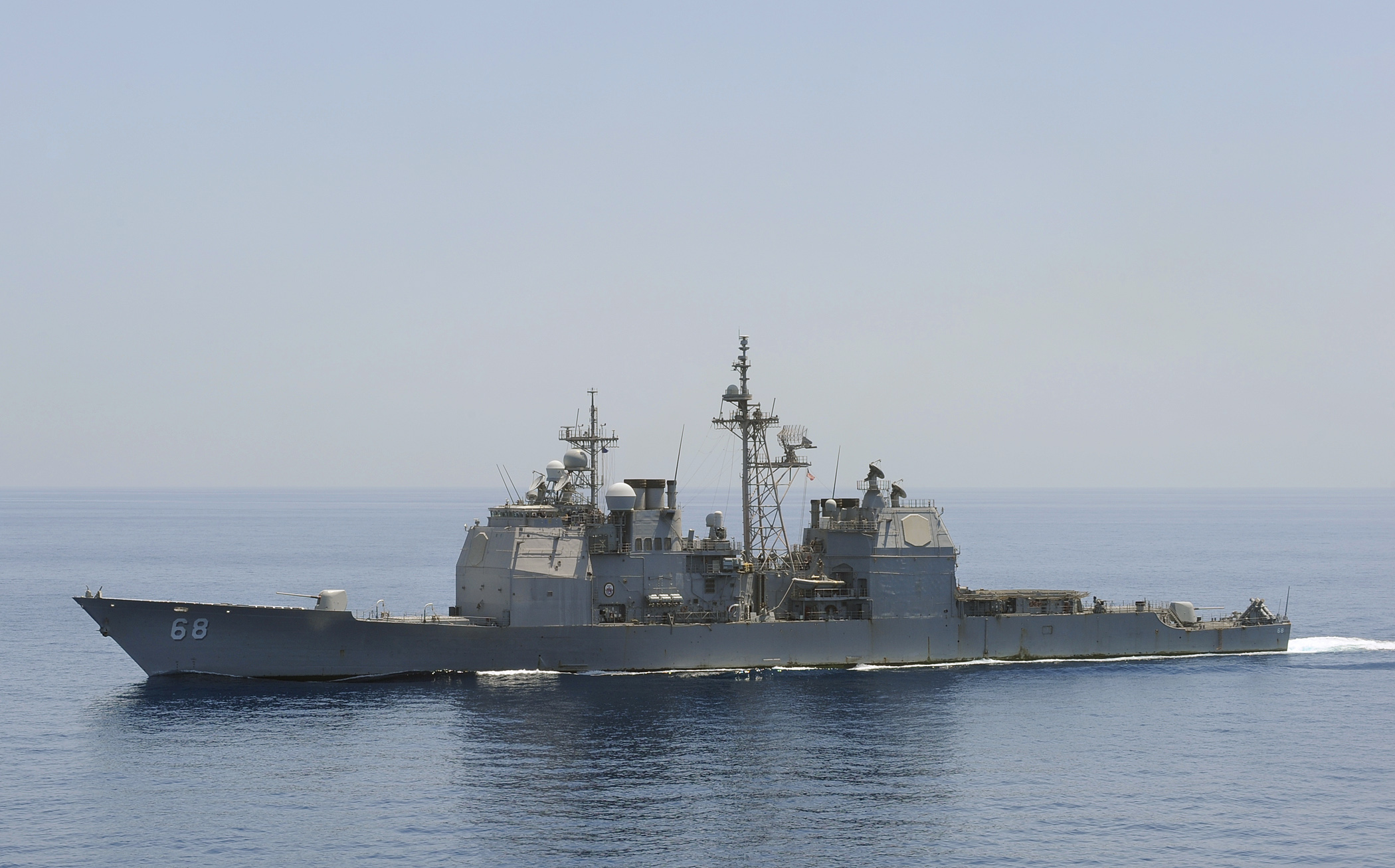
- USS Anzio on 7 October 2009

History

United States
- Name: Anzio
- Namesake: Battle of Anzio
- Ordered: 16 April 1987
- Builder: Ingalls Shipbuilding
- Laid down: 21 August 1989
- Launched: 2 November 1990
- Acquired: 10 February 1992
- Commissioned: 2 May 1992
- Decommissioned: 22 September 2022
- Identification: Call sign: NZIO; Hull number: CG-68
- Motto: Stand and Fight
- Status: Decommissioned
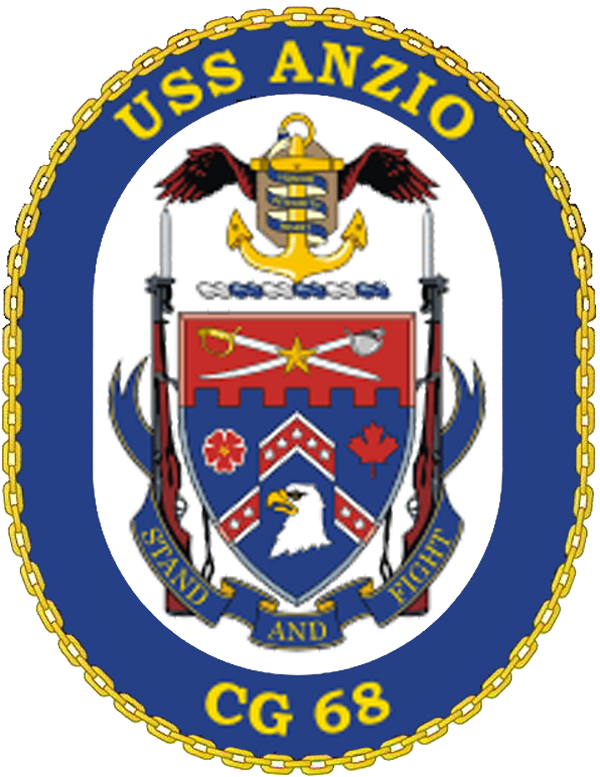
- Badge

General characteristics
- Class & type: Ticonderoga-class cruiser
- Displacement: Approx. 9,600 long tons (9,800 t) full load
- Length: 567 feet (173 m)
- Beam: 55 feet (16.8 meters)
- Draft: 34 feet (10.2 meters)
- Propulsion: 4 × General Electric LM2500 gas turbine engines; 2 × controllable-reversible pitch propellers; 2 × rudders
- Speed: 32.5 knots (60 km/h; 37.4 mph)
- Complement: 30 officers and 300 enlisted
- Sensors & processing systems: AN/SPY-1A/B multi-function radar; AN/SPS-49 air search radar (Removed on some ships); AN/SPG-62 fire control radar; AN/SPS-73 surface search radar; AN/SPQ-9 gun fire control radar; AN/SQQ-89(V)1/3 - A(V)15 Sonar suite, consisting of: AN/SQS-53B/C/D active sonar; AN/SQR-19 TACTAS, AN/SQR-19B ITASS, & MFTA passive sonar; AN/SQQ-28 light airborne multi-purpose system
- Armament: 2 × 61 cell Mk 41 vertical launch systems containing; 122 × mix of: RIM-66M-5 Standard SM-2MR Block IIIB; RIM-156A SM-2ER Block IV; RIM-161 SM-3; RIM-162A ESSM; RIM-174A Standard ERAM; BGM-109 Tomahawk; RUM-139A VL-ASROC; 8 × RGM-84 Harpoon missiles; 2 × 5 in (127 mm)/62 caliber Mark 45 Mod 4 lightweight gun; 2 × Mk 38 25 mm Machine Gun Systems; 2–4 × .50 in (12.7 mm) cal. machine gun; 2 × Phalanx CIWS Block 1B; 2 × Mk 32 12.75 in (324 mm) triple torpedo tubes
- Aircraft carried: 2 × MH-60R Seahawk LAMPS Mk III helicopters.

USS Anzio (CG-68) is a decommissioned Ticonderoga-class guided missile cruiser that served in the United States Navy. She was named for the site of a beachhead invasion of Italy by Allied troops from 22 January to 23 May 1944. Her keel was laid down by the Litton-Ingalls Shipbuilding Corporation at Pascagoula, Mississippi on 21 August 1989. The ship was launched on 2 November 1990, and commissioned on 2 May 1992. Anzio was decommissioned on 22 September 2022.

== History ==
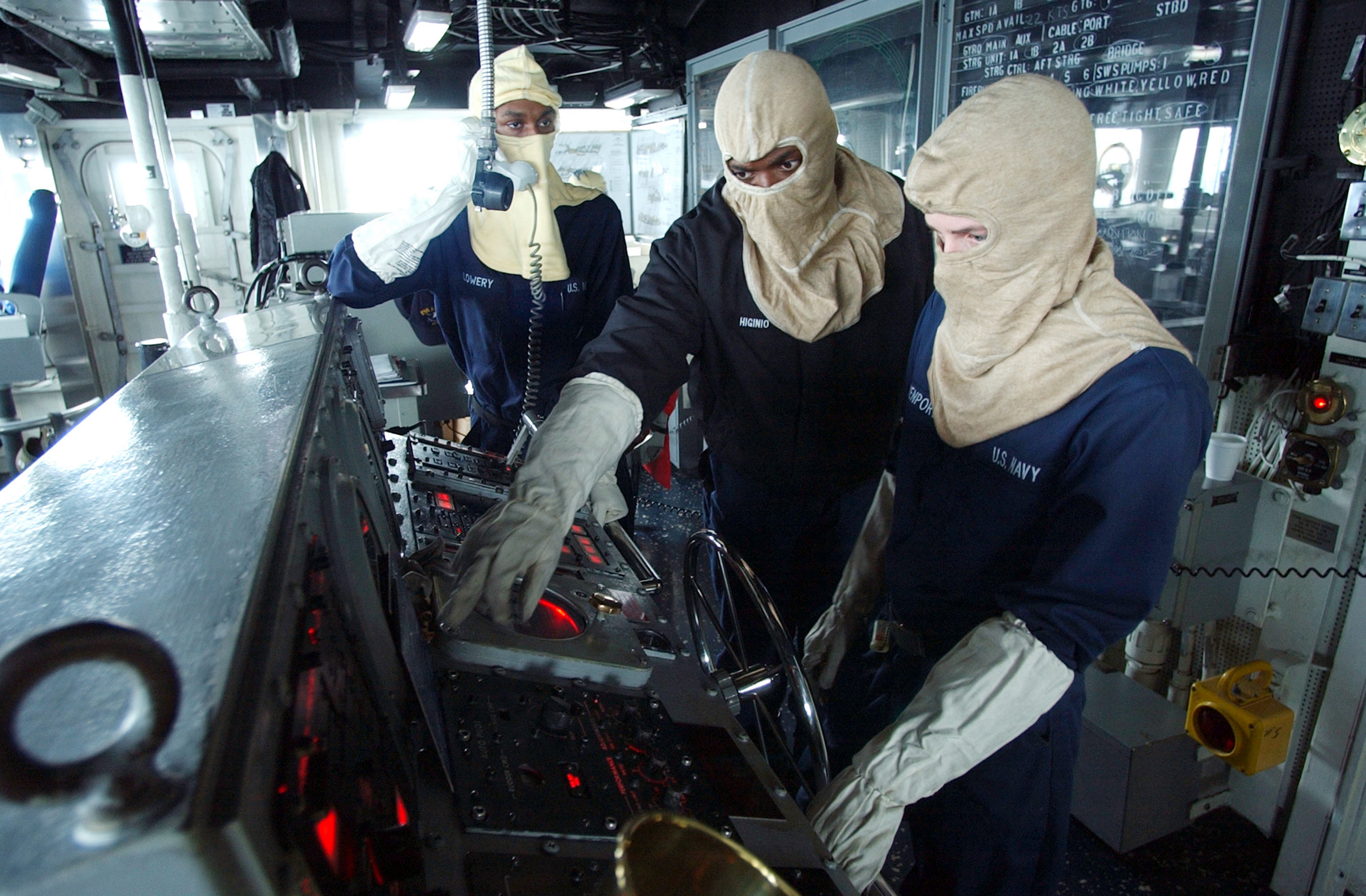
U.S. Navy sailors in flash gear man the helm during a general quarters drill aboard Anzio, June 2002.

=== 2000s ===
On 6 April 2000, Anzio, along with another cruiser and the aircraft carrier Dwight D. Eisenhower, was participating in an exercise in the Eastern Mediterranean Sea, about 250 miles (400 km) off the coast of Israel. In an unannounced missile test, the Israel Defense Forces fired a Jericho-1 medium-range ballistic missile from a test facility in Yavne, which landed 40 miles (64 km) from the ship. The missile was detected by the ship's radar, and the crew briefly thought that they were under attack.

On 9 January 2003, Anzio was pre-deployed in support of Operation Iraqi Freedom. Ordered first to the eastern Mediterranean Sea for the initial phase of President George W. Bush's Shock and Awe strategy (during which the U.S. Navy deployed to defeat the Iraq military before ground forces were sent in). Once Anzio completed her mission in the eastern Mediterranean, she forward-deployed to the Persian Gulf. Once Anzio arrived in the Persian Gulf, she had marked her 45th straight day at sea. In the Persian Gulf, Anzio continued carrier-flight support operations and coastal surveillance. After President Bush announced major combat had concluded in the Iraq War, on 1 May 2003, Anzio was relieved of her duties, returning home on 3 July 2003, after 175 days at sea. In March 2003, she was assigned to Cruiser-Destroyer Group Eight.

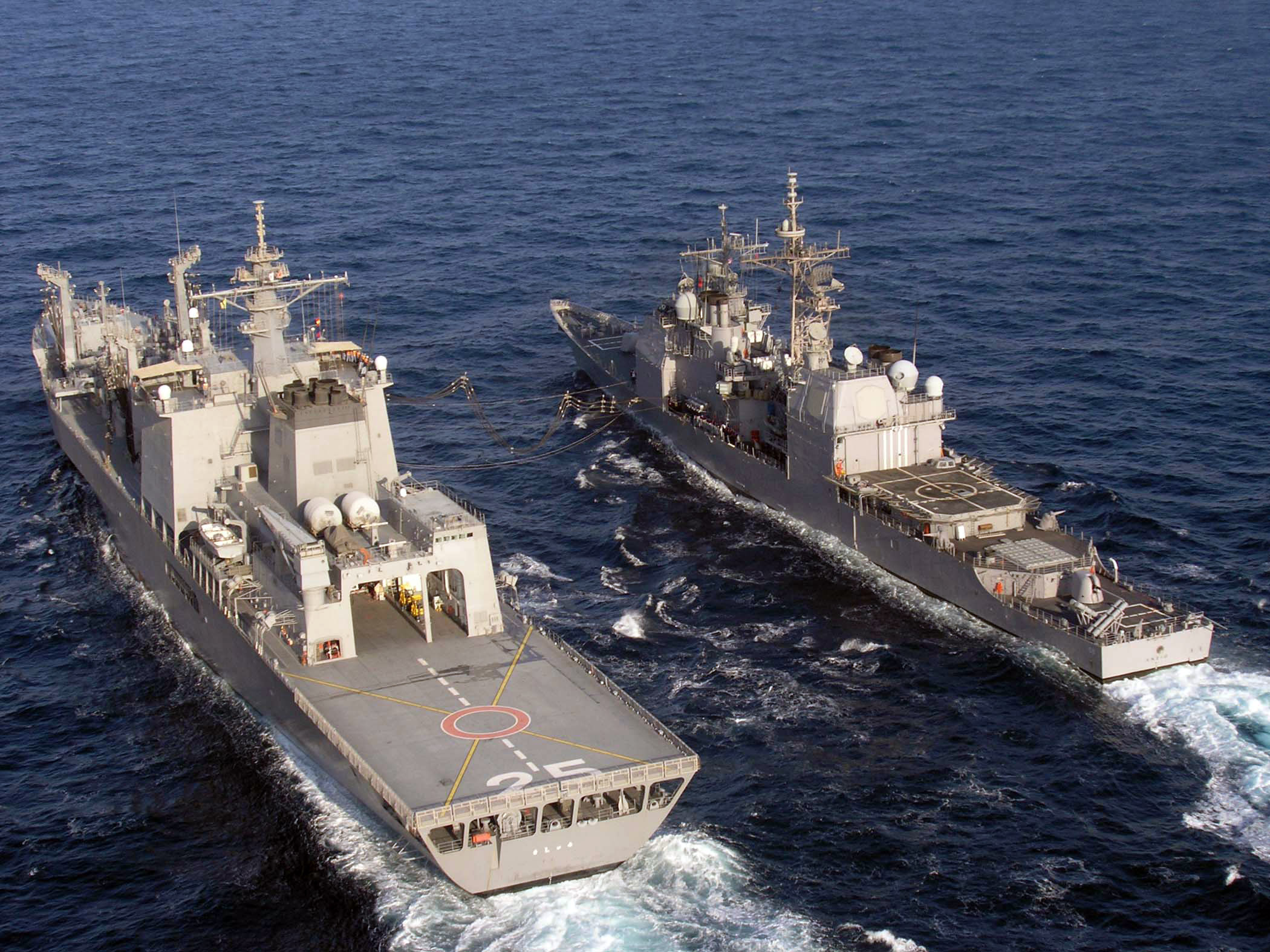
While in the Arabian Sea on 22 November 2006 - the Japanese fast combat support ship Mashu (left) conducts a replenishment at sea with USS Anzio

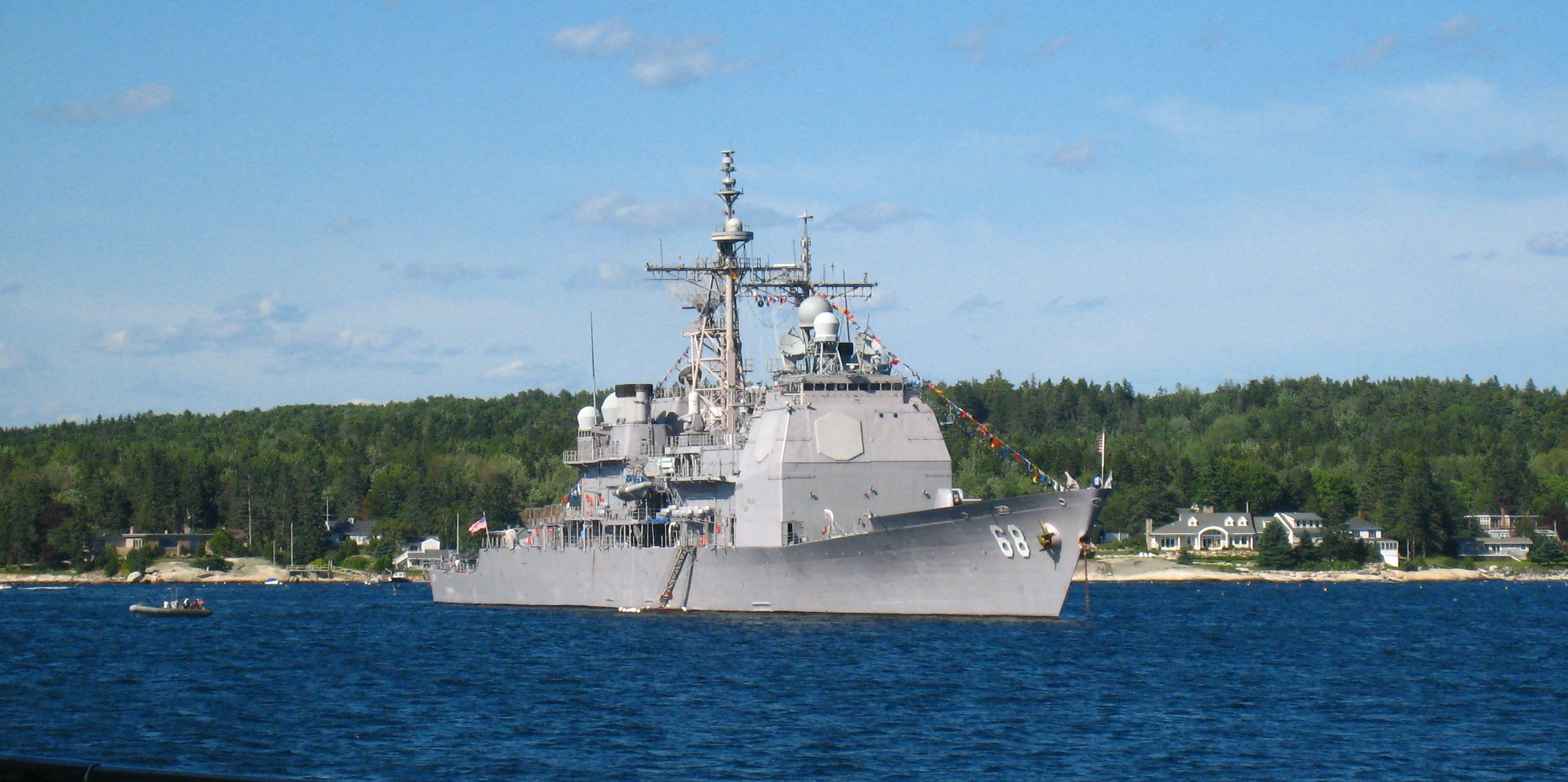
Anzio anchored at Boothbay Harbor, Maine in June 2008.

On 16 February 2007, Anzio was awarded the 2006 Battle "E" award.

Anzio has served as the flagship of the Horn of Africa international anti-piracy Combined Task Force 151. On 15 October 2009 a team from the cruiser working with United States Coast Guard personnel from Maritime Safety and Security Team 91104 seized a skiff carrying an estimated 4 tons of hashish worth an estimated $28 million about 170 nautical miles (310 km) southwest of Salalah, Oman. The boarding team destroyed the drugs by dumping them into the ocean and released the skiff's crew.

=== 2010s ===
Anzio was tentatively scheduled to be decommissioned and designated for disposal on 31 March 2013. However, Anzio was retained under the National Defense Authorization Act for Fiscal Year 2013.

On 13 January 2016, ten U.S. Navy sailors were picked up by Anzio for transport and medical evaluations after being held in Iranian custody. The sailors were captured by Iran on 12 January 2016 after their two naval boats entered Iranian waters. "The evidence suggests that they unintentionally entered the Iranian waters because of the failure of their navigational system," Islamic Revolutionary Guard Corps spokesman Ramazan Sharif said on Press TV. Anzio was also involved in a replenishment at sea operation with HMS Defender, USS Harry S. Truman, USS Ramage, USNS Pecos, and USNS Medgar Evers.

=== 2020s ===
In December 2020 the U.S. Navy's Report to Congress on the Annual Long-Range Plan for Construction of Naval Vessels stated that the ship was planned to be placed Out of Commission in Reserve in 2022.

On 22 September 2022, Anzio was decommissioned at Naval Station Norfolk, Virginia after 30 years of service.

== Notable crew ==
- Frank Castellano – American Navy captain (born 1964)
- Gordon Klingenschmitt – American military officer, politician, and religious figure (born 1968)
