= JS Mashū =

Mashū-class replenishment ship

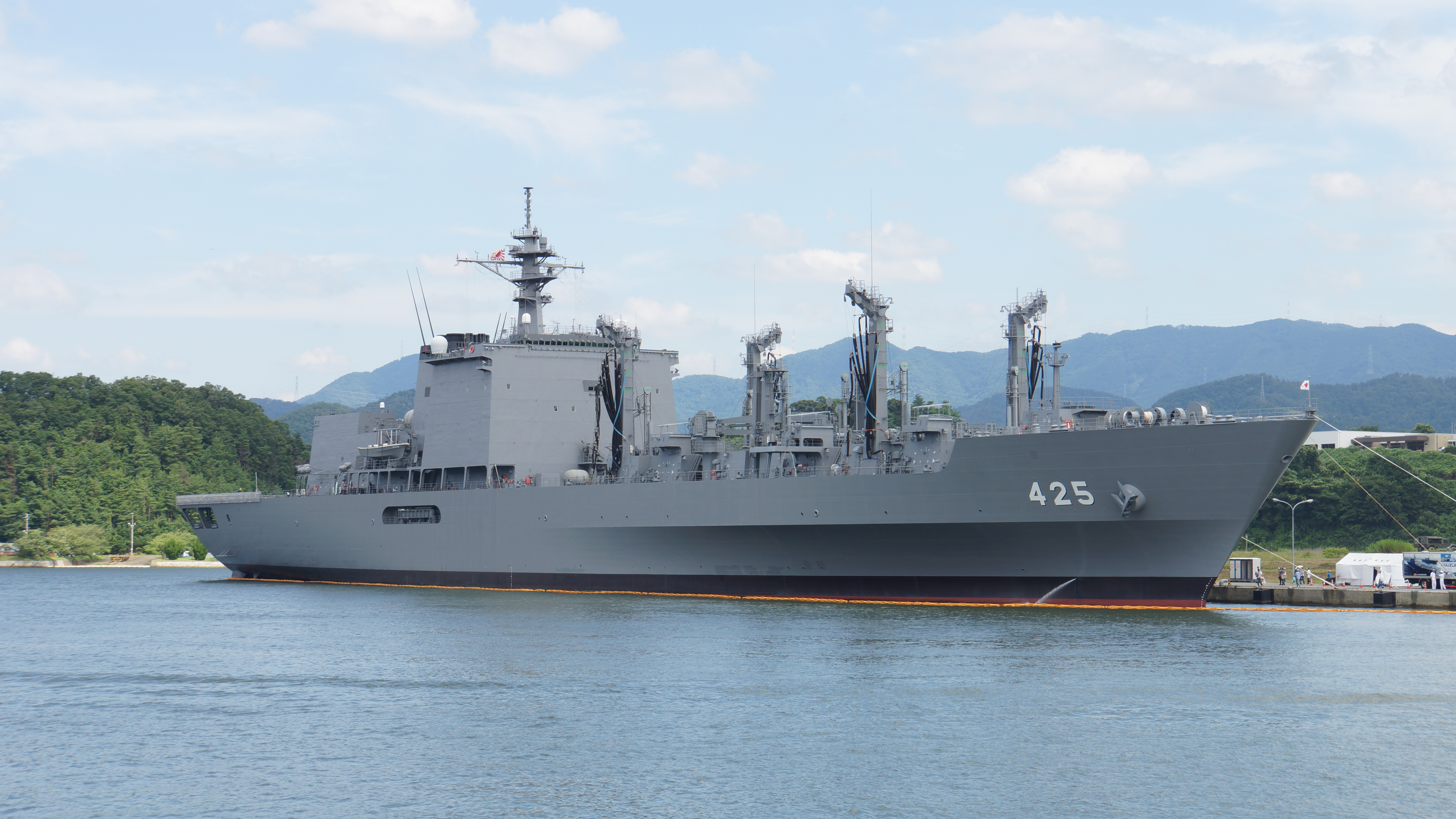
- JS Mashū on 16 July 2016.

History

Japan
- Name: Mashū; (ましゅう)
- Namesake: Lake Mashū
- Owner: Japan Maritime Self-Defense Force
- Builder: Hitachi Shipbuilding Corporation, Maizuru Ishikawajima-Harima Heavy Industries, Tokyo
- Laid down: 21 January 2002
- Launched: 5 February 2003
- Commissioned: 3 April 2006
- Home port: JMSDF Maizuru Naval Base
- Identification: Pennant number: AOE-425
- Status: Active

General characteristics
- Class & type: Mashū-class replenishment ship
- Displacement: 13,500 tonnes standard
- Length: 221 m (725 ft)
- Beam: 27.0 m (88.6 ft)
- Draught: 8.0 m (26.2 ft)
- Propulsion: 2 × Kawasaki Rolls-Royce Spey SM1C gas turbines; 40,000 shp (29,828 kW) each; 2 × shafts
- Speed: 24 knots (44 km/h; 28 mph)
- Range: 9,500 nmi (17,594 km; 10,932 mi) at 20 knots (37 km/h; 23 mph)
- Complement: 150
- Sensors & processing systems: OPS-28 Surface Search RDF; OPS-20 Navigation RDF
- Electronic warfare & decoys: NOLR-8 RDF Interceptor; Mk.137 decoy launchers
- Armament: 2 × Phalanx CIWS
- Aircraft carried: 1 × helicopter
- Aviation facilities: Helicopter deck and enclosed hangar

Mashū (AOE-425) is the lead ship of the Mashū-class replenishment ships of the Japanese Maritime Self-Defense Force. She was commissioned on 3 April 2006.

== Construction and career ==
She was laid down on 21 January 2002 and launched on 5 February 2003. Commissioned on 3 April 2006 with the hull number AOE-425.

== Gallery ==
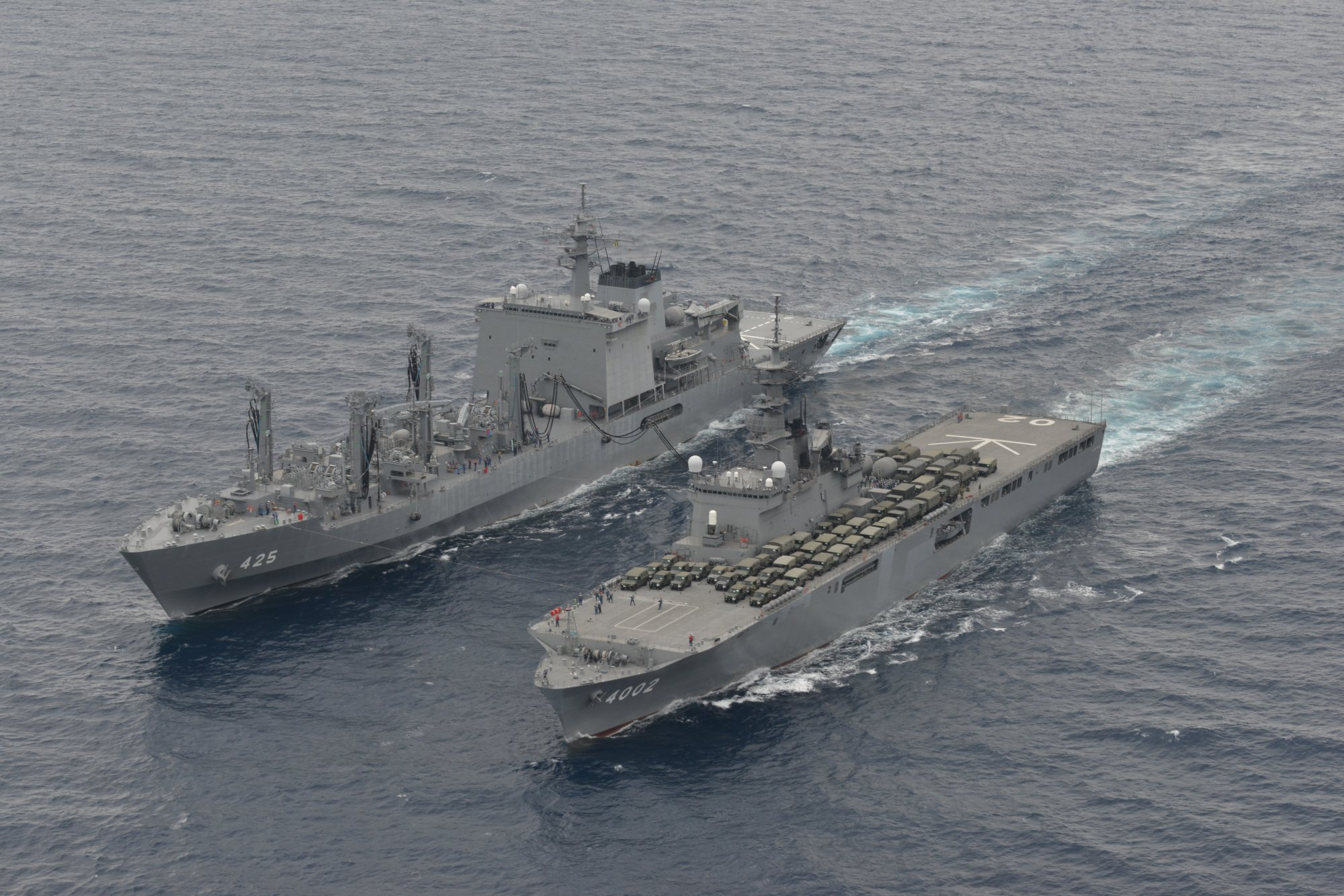
JS Mashū and JS Shimokita underway together, date unknown.

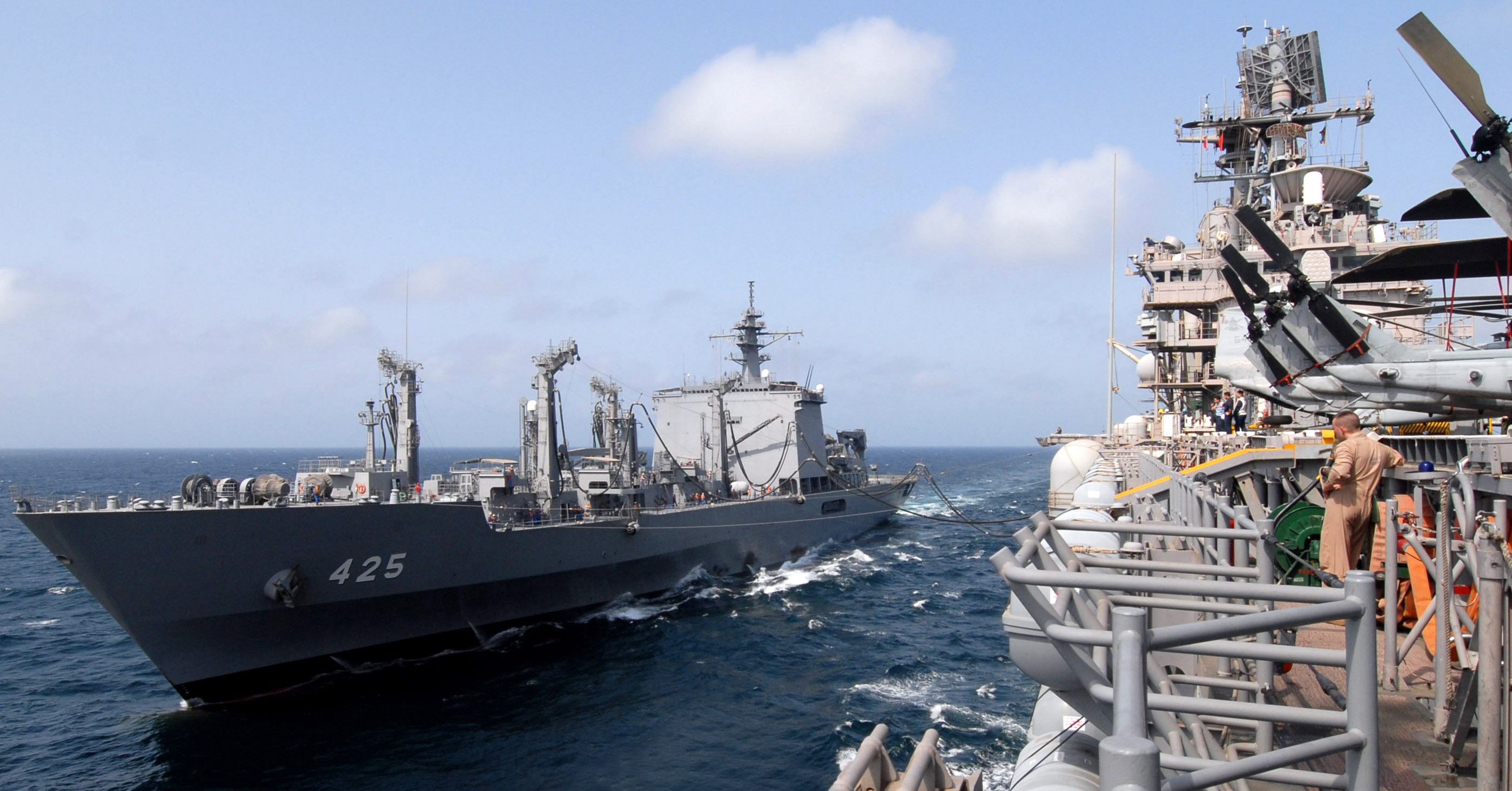
JS Mashū alongside USS Iwo Jima on 4 September 2006.

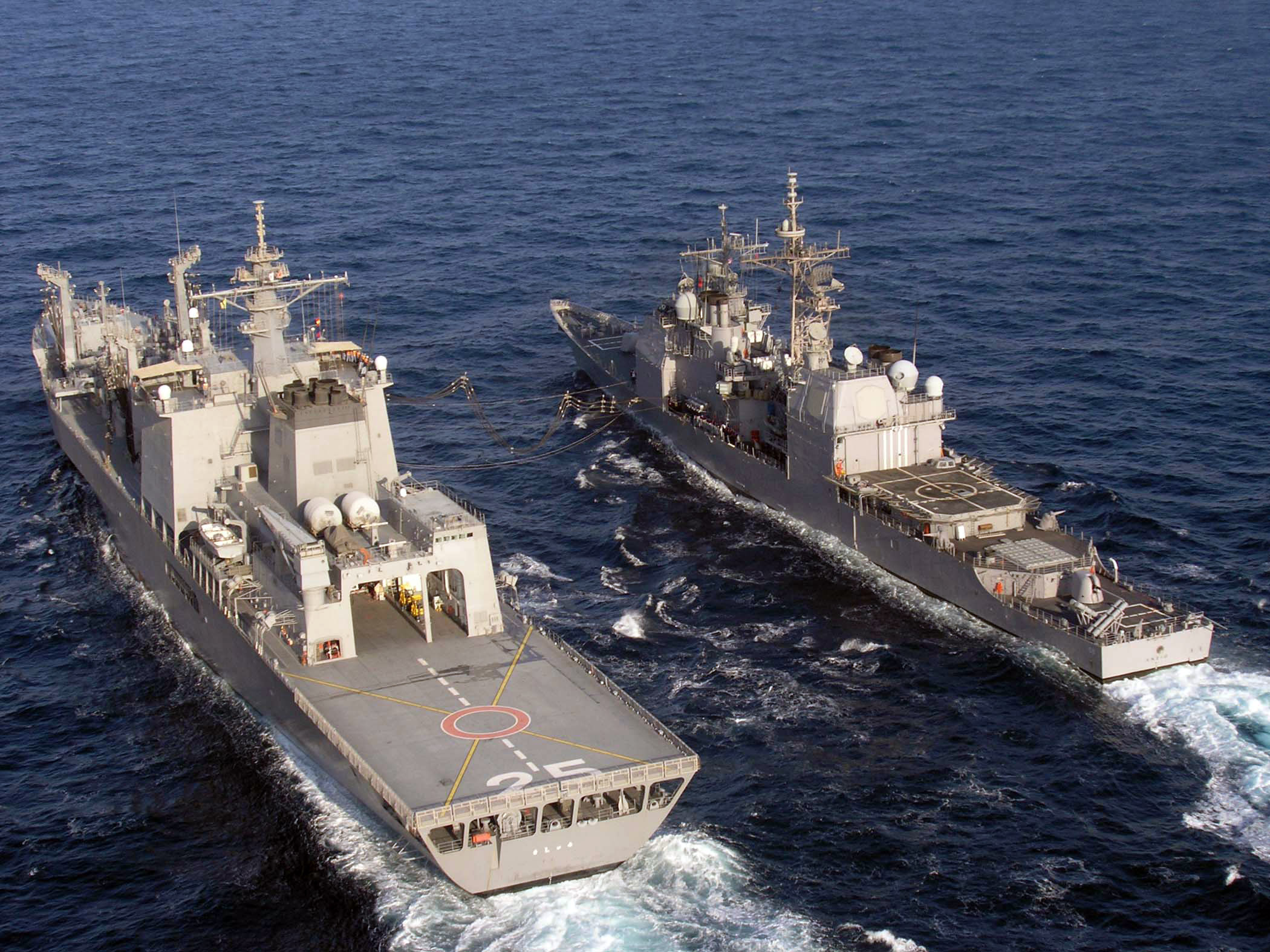
JS Mashū and USS Anzio doing replenish at sea on 22 November 2006.

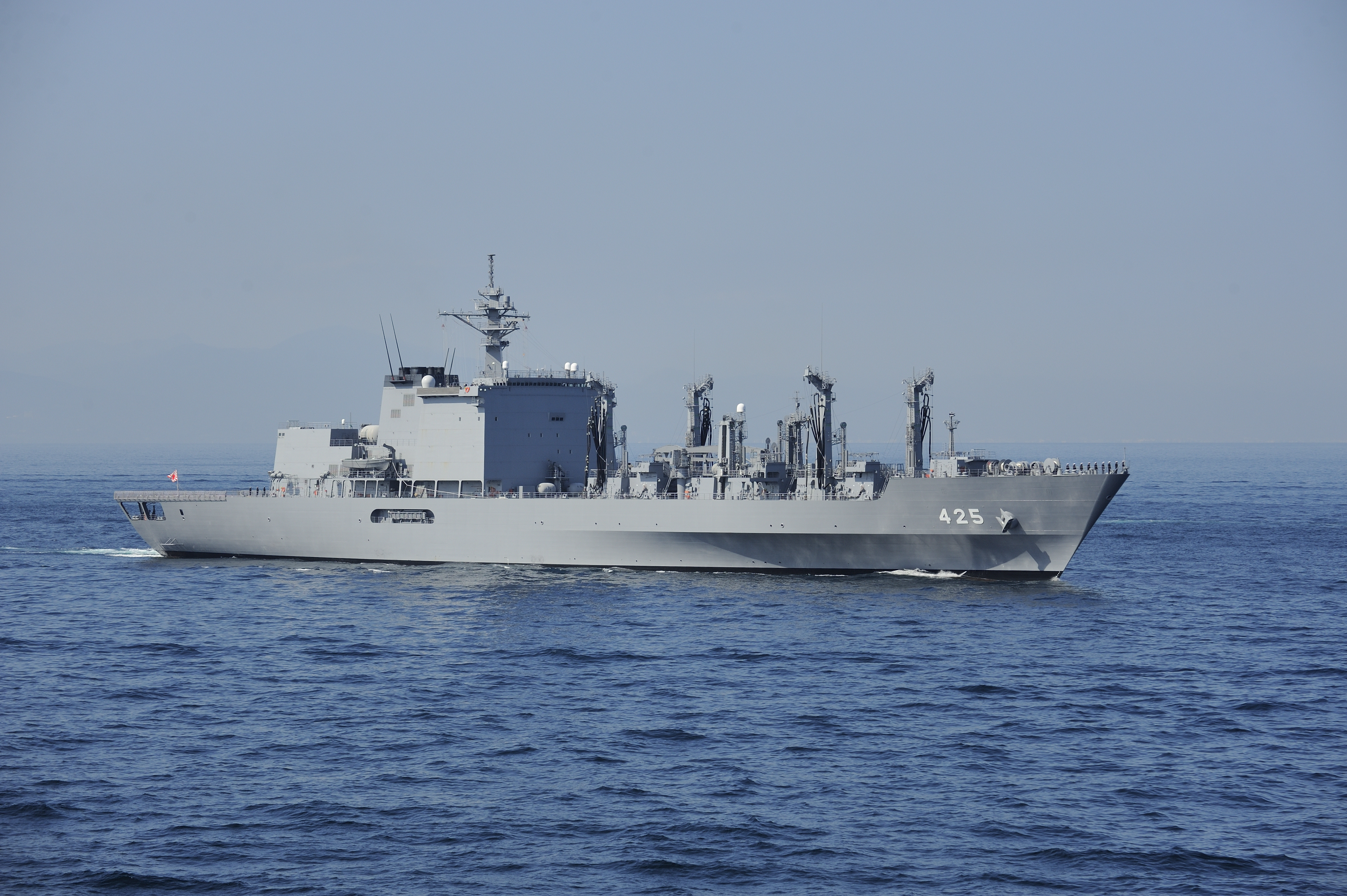
JS Mashū at the Sagami Bay on 21 October 2009

JS Mashū passing under the Rainbow Bridge, Tokyo on 6 February 2010.

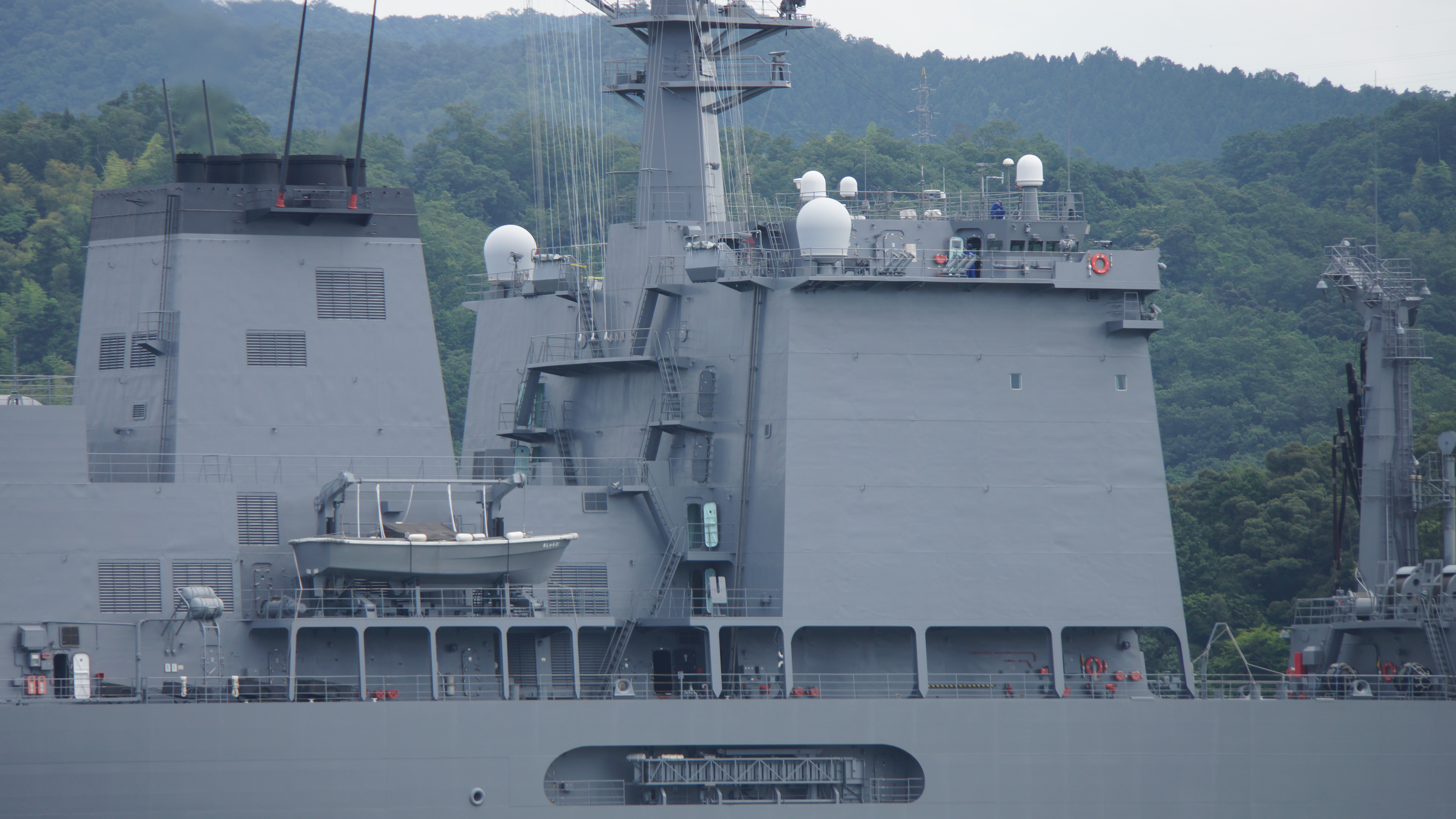
JS Mashū in Maizuru, Japan on 16 July 2016.

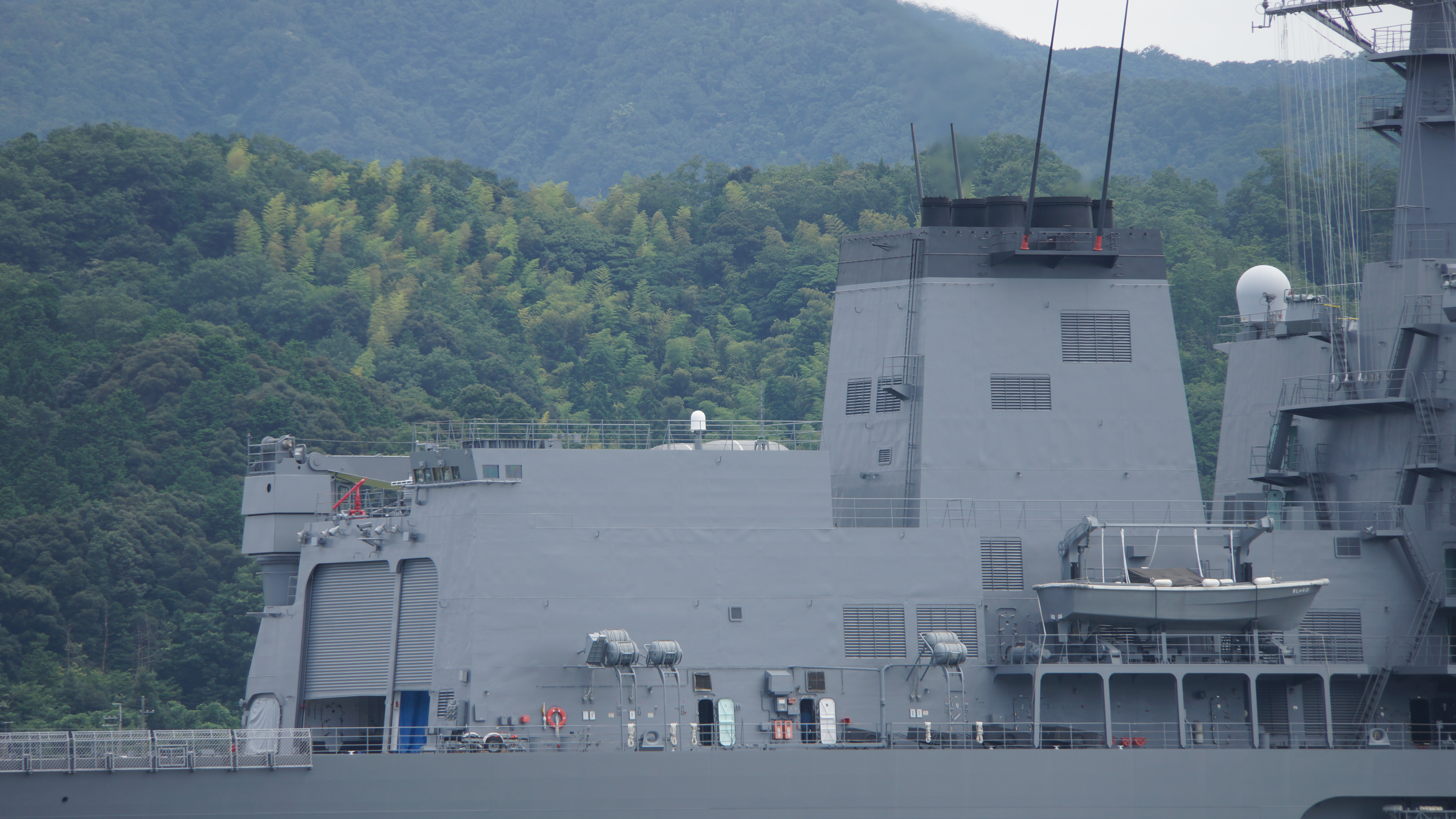
JS Mashū in Maizuru, Japan on 16 July 2016.

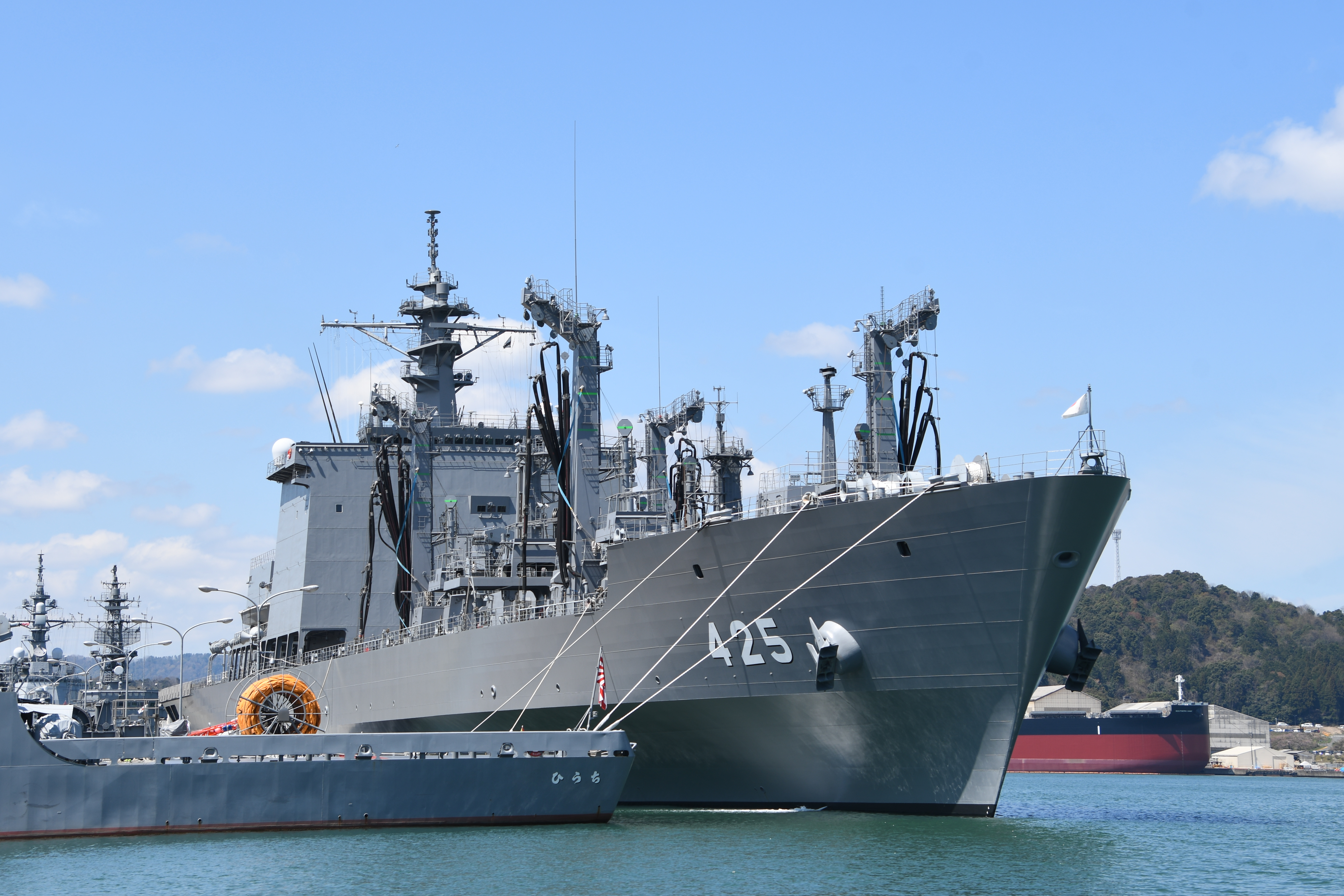
JS Mashū in Maizuru Naval Base on 13 April 2019.
