= Kanagawa 11th district =

Legislative district of Japan

Kanagawa 11th District
- 神奈川県第11区
- Parliamentary constituency for the Japanese House of Representatives
- Numbered map of Kanagawa Prefecture single-member districts
- Prefecture: Kanagawa
- Proportional District: Minamikanto
- Electorate: 374,938

Current constituency
- Created: 1994
- Seats: One
- Party: LDP
- Representative: Shinjirō Koizumi (2009-)
- Created from: Kanagawa's 2nd "medium-sized" district
- Municipalities: Yokosuka, Miura

Kanagawa 11th district (神奈川県第11区, Kanagawa-ken dai-juichi-ku; also 神奈川11区, Kanagawa-ken juichi-ku) is a constituency of the House of Representatives in the Diet of Japan (national legislature). It is located in Kanagawa Prefecture, and consists of the cities of Miura and Yokosuka.

This constituency has United States Fleet Activities Yokosuka where is the home port of US Naval Forces in Japan which is the integral part of United States Forces Japan, home of Seventh Fleet of United States Navy and JMSDF Yokosuka Naval Base, which hosts Fleet Submarine Force, Mine Warfare Force, Fleet Research and Development Command, Fleet Intelligence Command of Japan Maritime Self-Defense Force. It also has Nissan Oppama Plant, Yokosuka Research Park

Former Prime Minister of Japan Junichiro Koizumi served as the first representative of the constituency from its creation in 1996. Koizumi retired at the 2009 elections and his son Shinjirō ran as a candidate for his father's old seat. The Democratic Party of Japan fielded Katsuhito Yokokume, a lawyer and former participant in the Ainori TV show, as a candidate in 2009 to a bid to end the LDP dominance of the district.

As of September 2012, 391,020 eligible voters were registered in the district.

== List of representatives ==
Member	Party	Dates	Electoral history	Notes
Junichiro Koizumi	Liberal Democratic	20 October 1996 – 21 July 2009	Elected in 1996. Re-elected in 2000. Re-elected in 2003. Re-elected in 2005. Retired.	Prime Minister of Japan (2001–2006); Minister of Health and Welfare (1988–1989; 1996–1998); Minister of Post and Telecommunications (1992–1993)
Shinjirō Koizumi	Liberal Democratic	31 August 2009 – present	Elected in 2009. Re-elected in 2012. Re-elected in 2014. Re-elected in 2017. Re-elected in 2021. Re-elected in 2024. Re-elected in 2026.	Minister of Defense (2025-); Minister of Agriculture (2025); Minister of the Environment (2019–2021); Second son of Junichirō Koizumi

== Election results ==
2026
Party	Candidate	Votes	%	±%
LDP	Shinjirō Koizumi	149,029	79.5	▲7.1
JCP	Minoru Tamesō	19,299	10.3	▼3.6
Sanseitō	Kōhei Maebayashi	19,191	10.2	▼3.5
Registered electors		357,788		
Turnout			54.49	▲2.7
LDP hold				

2024
Party	Candidate	Votes	%	±%
LDP	Shinjirō Koizumi	129,779	72.3	▼6.9
JCP	Minoru Tamesō	24,850	13.9	▼6.9
Sanseitō	Hiroki Hajikano	24,718	13.7	
Turnout		179,347	51.79	▼0.42

2021
Party	Candidate	Votes	%	±%
LDP	Shinjirō Koizumi	147,634	79.2	▲1.2
JCP	Nobuaki Hayashi	38,843	20.8	▲9.8
Turnout			52.21	▲0.1

2017
Party	Candidate	Votes	%	±%
LDP	Shinjirō Koizumi	154,761	78.0	▼5.3
JCP	Kazuhiro Seto	21,874	11.0	▼5.7
Kibō no Tō	Ryō Mashiro	18,583	9.4	
Turnout			52.11	▼2.4

2014
Party	Candidate	Votes	%	±%
LDP	Shinjirō Koizumi	168,953	83.3	▲3.4
JCP	Kazuhiro Seto	33,930	16.7	▲9.0
Turnout			54.50	

2012
Party	Candidate	Votes	%	±%
LDP	Shinjirō Koizumi	184,360	79.9	
Democratic	Kōtarō Hayashi	25,134	10.9	
JCP	Michio Saida	17,740	7.7	
Independent	Toshihide Morimoto	2,131	0.9	
Independent	Yoshinobu Iwata	1,489	0.6	

2009
Party	Candidate	Votes	%	±%
LDP	Shinjirō Koizumi	150,893	56.16	▼17.00
Democratic	Katsuhito Yokokume (elected in S. Kanto PR block)	96,631	35.97	▲17.20
JCP	Masako Itō	12,601	4.69	▲0.47
Happiness Realization	Akihisa Tsurukawa	2,375	0.88	N/A
Independent	Yoshinobu Iwata	1,830	0.68	N/A
Majority		54,262	20.20	▼34.19
Turnout		268,666	68.12	▼0.34
LDP hold		Swing	-17.10	

2005
Party	Candidate	Votes	%	±%
LDP	Junichiro Koizumi	197,037	73.16	−1.26
Democratic	Tsuyoshi Saitō	50,551	18.77	0.0
JCP	Kazuhiro Seto	11,377	4.22	−1.59
Independent	Naoto Amaki	7,475	2.78	0.0
Independent	Hideyoshi Hashiba	2,874	1.07	0.0
Majority		146,486	54.39	−0.28
Turnout		272,431	68.46	8.55
LDP hold		Swing		

2003
Party	Candidate	Votes	%	±%
LDP	Junichiro Koizumi	174,374	74.42	5.40
Democratic	Yusuke Sawaki	46,290	19.76	1.02
JCP	Kazuhiro Seto	13,632	5.82	0.0
Majority		128,084	54.67	4.38
Turnout		238,996	59.91	0.52
LDP hold		Swing		

2000
Party	Candidate	Votes	%	±%
LDP	Junichiro Koizumi	157,335	69.03	10.87
Democratic	Yusuke Sawaki	42,707	18.74	0.0
JCP	Yasushi Koizumi	27,890	12.24	0.0
Majority		114,628	50.29	18.30
Turnout			59.39	−0.26
LDP hold		Swing		

1996
Party	Candidate	Votes	%	±%
LDP	Junichiro Koizumi	118,955	58.16	0.0
New Frontier	Tadatsugu Miyagi	53,523	26.17	0.0
JCP	Mitsutaka Yoshida	27,518	13.45	0.0
Liberal League	Seiichi Hata	4,552	2.23	0.0
Majority		65,432	31.99	0.0
Turnout			59.65	0.0
LDP hold		Swing		

House of Representatives (Japan)
Preceded by Ishikawa 2nd district	Constituency represented by the prime minister 2001–2006	Succeeded by Yamaguchi 4th district
