= Manki Yamashita =

Japanese admiral (born 1960)

Kazuki Yamashita
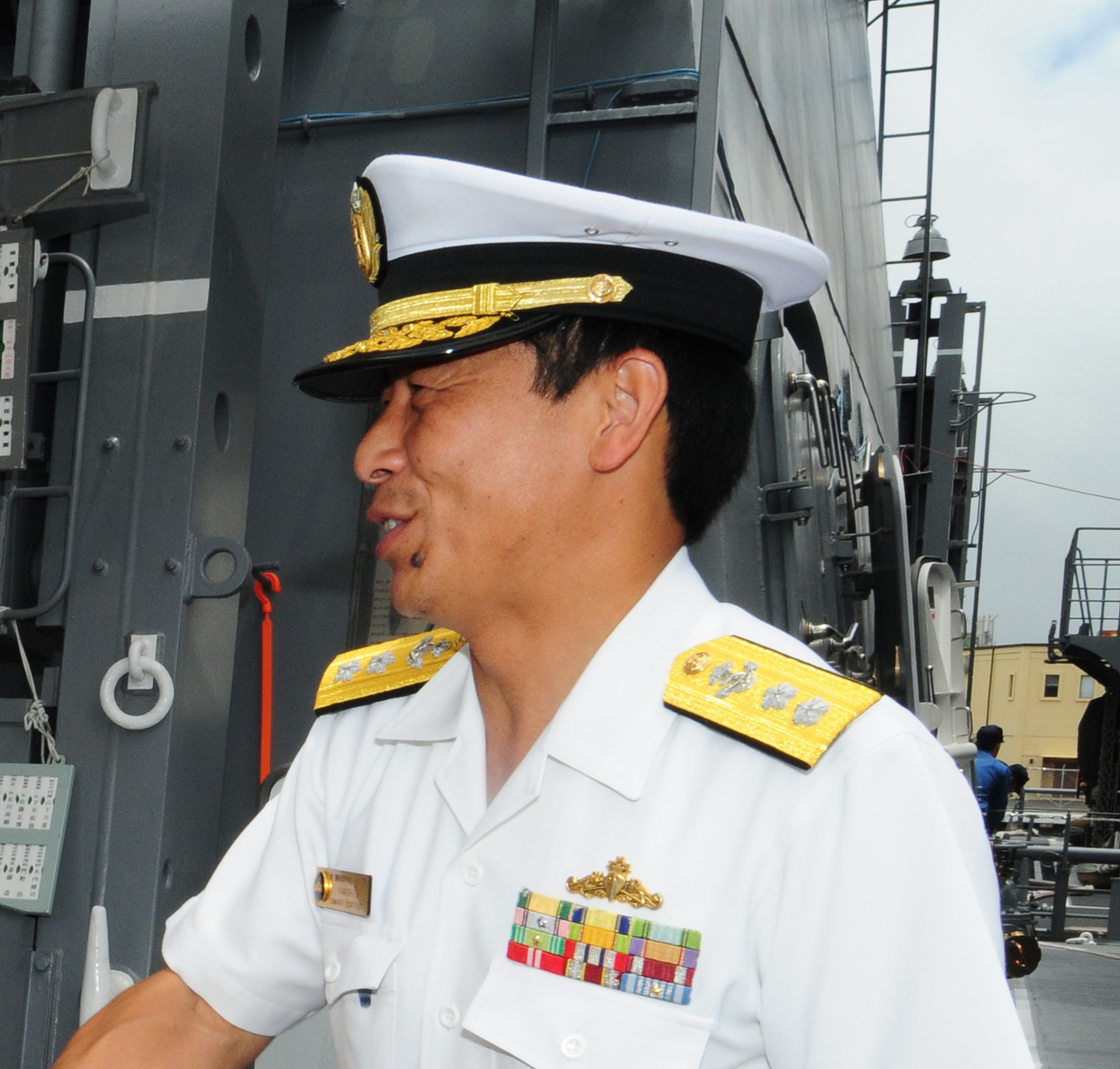
- Born: 2 August 1960 (age 66); Kumamoto Prefecture
- Military career
- Allegiance: Japan
- Branch: Japan Maritime Self-Defense Force
- Service years: 1983–2019
- Rank: Admiral
- Commands: Commander of the Self Defense Fleet; Sasebo District Commander; Captain of the JS Matsuyuki; Commander of the 1st Escort Flotilla; Chief of Staff, Fleet Submarine Force
- Awards: See Awards

Kazuki Yamashita (山下万喜, Yamashita Kazuki; born 2 August 1960) is a retired Japanese naval officer who served as Commander of the Self Defense Fleet of the Japan Maritime Self-Defense Force (JMSDF) from 2016 to 2019. He was the 49th Commander of the Self-Defense Fleet, succeeding Yasuhiro Shigeoka, and was himself succeeded in 2019 by Hiroyuki Kasui.

== Career ==
Yamashita was born in Kumamoto Prefecture on 2 August 1960. In March 1983, he graduated from the 27th class of the National Defense Academy, where he studied electrical engineering, and joined the Maritime Self-Defense Force. He completed the Maritime Self-Defense Force Officer Candidate School in March 1984. His first seagoing posting, from November 1984, was as a junior officer aboard the destroyer Kurama, the first in a long series of shipboard postings.

In July 1997, he was promoted to lieutenant commander (2nd class kaisa).

In March 1998, he was transferred to the escort ship Setogiri as gunnery and torpedo officer and deputy commanding officer.

On 26 March 1999, he became Commanding Officer of the destroyer Matsuyuki.

On 24 March 2000, he was posted to the Operations Division, Defense Department, Maritime Staff Office.

On 1 January 2002, he was promoted to commander (1st class kaisa).

On 20 August 2003, he became group leader of the Business Planning Group in the Defense Division, Defense Department, Maritime Staff Office, while concurrently serving at the Maritime Self-Defense Force Command and Staff College.

On 5 March 2004, he became team leader of the Defense Team in the same division, again concurrently serving at the Command and Staff College.

On 1 August 2005, he became Commander of the 3rd Escort Division.

On 31 July 2006, he became Chief of the Equipment System Division, Defense Department, Maritime Staff Office.

On 1 September 2007, he became Chief of the Appointments Section, Personnel and Education Department, Maritime Staff Office.

On 1 August 2008, he was promoted to rear admiral (kaisho-ho). On 1 December of the same year, he became Commander of the 1st Escort Flotilla. During his tenure, in mid-2010, he led the JMSDF contingent — comprising the destroyers Atago and Akebono, the submarine Mochishio, and three P-3C patrol aircraft — at the RIMPAC 2010 multinational exercise, marking 30 years since Japan's first participation in RIMPAC.

On 20 August 2010, he became Chief of Staff of the Fleet Submarine Force.

On 5 August 2011, he became Director of the Training Department at the National Defense Academy.

On 26 July 2012, he became Director of the Defense Department, Maritime Staff Office.

On 5 August 2014, he was promoted to admiral (kaisho) and became Commandant of the Maritime Self-Defense Force Command and Staff College.

On 4 August 2015, he became the 42nd Commander of the Sasebo District.

On 22 December 2016, he was appointed the 49th Commander of the Self-Defense Fleet, following cabinet approval of the appointment on 20 December.

He retired from the JMSDF on 1 April 2019, after 36 years of service; contemporary defence commentary described him, alongside the concurrent Sasebo District post he had also held, as having filled both of the JMSDF's traditional stepping-stone positions to Chief of Staff, and noted that his retirement without advancing to that post came as a surprise to some observers of the service.

== Awards ==
3rd Defensive Memorial Cordon

7th Defensive Memorial Cordon

10th Defensive Memorial Cordon

11th Defensive Memorial Cordon

13th Defensive Memorial Cordon

15th Defensive Memorial Cordon

18th Defensive Memorial Cordon

22nd Defensive Memorial Cordon

24th Defensive Memorial Cordon

33rd Defensive Memorial Cordon

40th Defensive Memorial Cordon

41st Defensive Memorial Cordon

== See also ==
- Japanese military ranks
- Self Defense Fleet
