= JMSDF Yokosuka Naval Base =

Naval base in Kanagawa Prefecture, Japan

Yokosuka Naval Base
- 横須賀基地
- Part of Yokosuka District Force
- Yokosuka, Kantō region in Japan
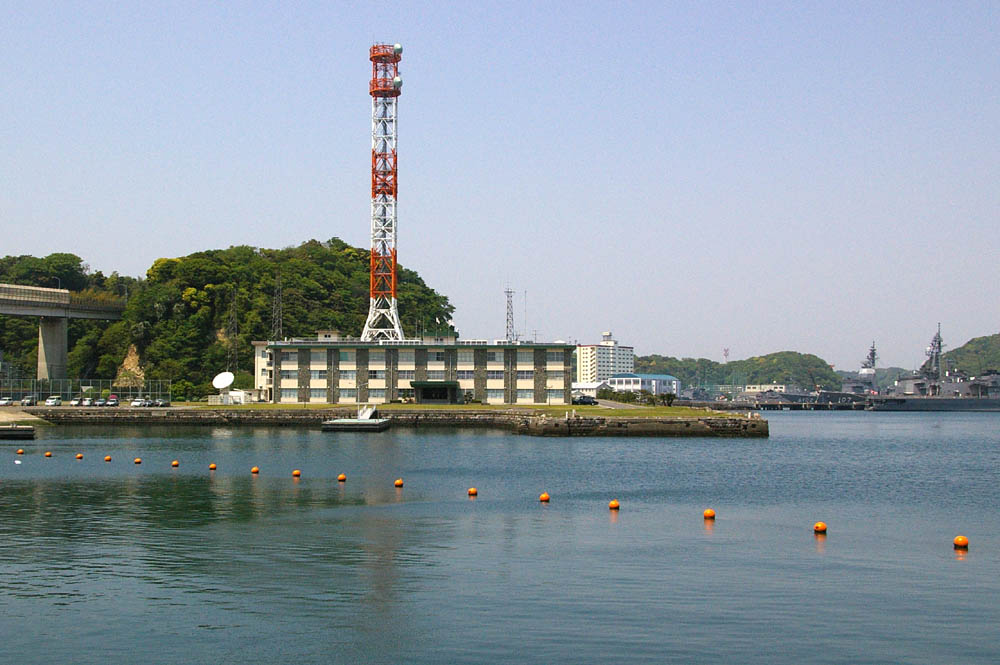

Site information
- Type: Naval base
- Owner: Japanese Maritime Self-Defense Force
- Operator: Japan Maritime Self-Defense Force
- Website: www.mod.go.jp/msdf/yokosuka/index.html

Location
- Coordinates: 35°17′10″N 139°39′14″E

Site history
- Built: 26 April 1952
- In use: 1952

Garrison information
- Occupants: Self Defense Fleet; Communications Command; Yokosuka District Force

The Yokosuka Naval Base (Japanese: 横須賀基地, Hepburn: Yokosuka Kichi), also simply known as the JMSDF Yokosuka Naval Base, is a group of ports and land facilities of the Japan Maritime Self-Defense Force (JMSDF), which are scattered in multiple districts of Yokosuka City, Kanagawa Prefecture, and where the Yokosuka District Force, etc. are located. It is not officially called a base, but it is used as a common name. The base sits alongside the United States Fleet Activities Yokosuka.

It has a facility where people can train with Japan's technology to create water pressure in the deep sea (water depth 450 meters). Not only allied countries such as the United States, Thailand, and Vietnam, but also the navy of hypothetical enemy countries such as Russia are visiting.

== History ==
On 26 April 1952, the Coastal Safety Force was established from the Japan Coast Guard, and the Coastal Safety Force Yokosuka Regional Supervision Department was established at the site of the former Suirai Naval Academy (currently the 2nd Technical School) in Tauraminatocho. On 1 August, with the establishment of the National Safety Agency, the Coastal Security Force alongside Yokosuka District Force were both reorganized. On 16 September 1953, Guards Technical School was newly published in Taura and 19 October, Yokosuka District Force moves from Taura to the current location, Nishihemicho.

On 16 January 1956, the Maritime Self-Defense Force Technical School was relocated to Etajima. Since education such as institutions will continue to be conducted in Yokosuka, the Maritime Self-Defense Force Technical School Yokosuka Branch School was to be newly established. On 1 March, Self-Defense Forces Yokosuka Hospital opens in Kurihama District.

On 1 April 1958, the Yokosuka Defense Force, Kenzaki Guard Station and Kannonzaki Guard Station were newly added to the Yokosuka Base Guard. Maritime Self-Defense Force Technical School Yokosuka Branch School renamed to Maritime Self-Defense Force 2nd Technical School. On 1 June 1959, it was renamed from Yokosuka Base Guard to Yokosuka Guard. On 1 September, Yokosuka Education Corps was newly established in the Takeyama area.

On 1 February 1961, new editions includes the Yokosuka Supply Station and Yokosuka Factory. On 1 March, the Explosive Ordnance Disposal Unit was newly added to the Yokosuka Defense Force. On 1 March 1965, the Funakoshi Division was newly added to the Yokosuka Guard.

On 2 March 1970, addition to the base includes Yokosuka Zoushusho and Yokosuka Sanitary Corps. Abolished Yokosuka Works. On 11 April 1974, more addition to the base includes Yokosuka Music Corps. 27 December 1977, the Maritime Self-Defense Force Diving Medical Experiment Team is newly established in the Kurihama area.

In 1980, Yoshikura Pier completed. On 1 July 1985, the Yokosuka torpedo control station was abolished. New edition of Yokosuka torpedo maintenance station. On 1 July 1987, the Yokosuka garrison was abolished. Reorganization of the guard. New edition of Yokosuka Base Service Corps. Kenzaki guard station was abolished. On 31 March 1988, the Self-Defense Forces Yokosuka Hospital was relocated to its current location (Taura District).

On 8 December 1998, Yokosuka Supply Station and Yokosuka Repair Station were integrated and reorganized into Yokosuka Repair Supply Station, and the torpedo maintenance station and guided ammunition maintenance station were also integrated to Yokosuka Ammunition Maintenance Supply Station. Establishment of the Maritime Self-Defense Force Ship Supply Office and transferred it to the Maritime Self-Defense Force Supply Headquarters.

On 15 April 2010, the Hemi Dock was completed.

On 11 March 2011, In response to the Tohoku-Pacific Ocean Earthquake, all operable ships belonging to Yokosuka Base were dispatched off Sanriku as a disaster dispatch.

On 26 March 2012, Yokosuka Guard Kannonzaki Guard Station was abolished and on 1 September, Self-Defense Forces Yokosuka Hospital Education Department moved from Kurihama area to Taura area.

== Facilities and operational units ==
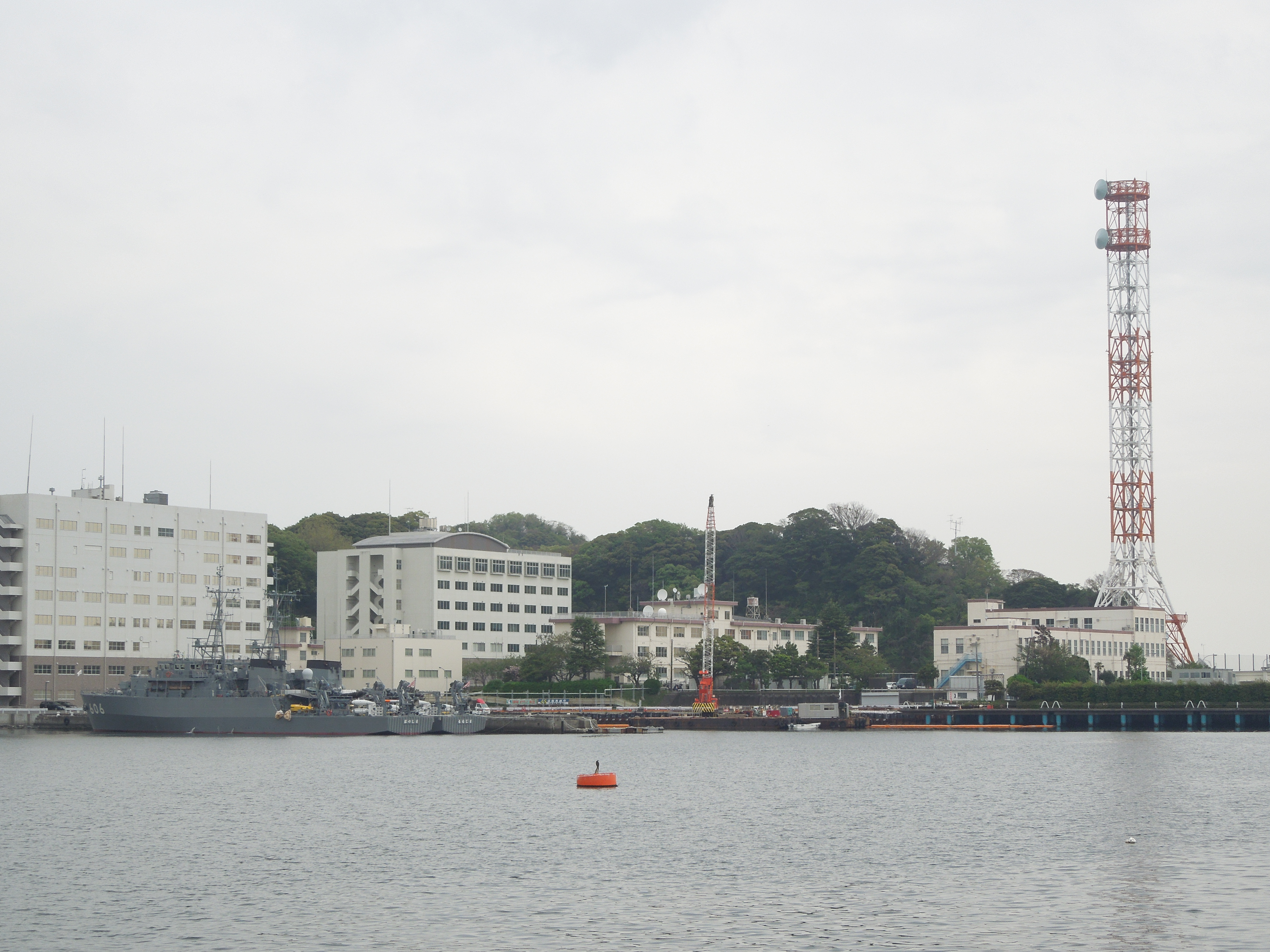
Funakoshi District

=== Funakoshi District ===
- Self Defense Fleet Command
  - Fleet Escort Force
  - Fleet Submarine Command
  - Mine Warfare Force Headquarter
  - Fleet Research and Development Command
  - Fleet Intelligence Command
  - Oceanography ASW Support Command
- Yokosuka District Force
  - 41st Mine Warfare Force
  - Yokosuka Base Service Corps
  - Yokosuka Sanitary Corps
- Communications Command
  - Maintenance audit team

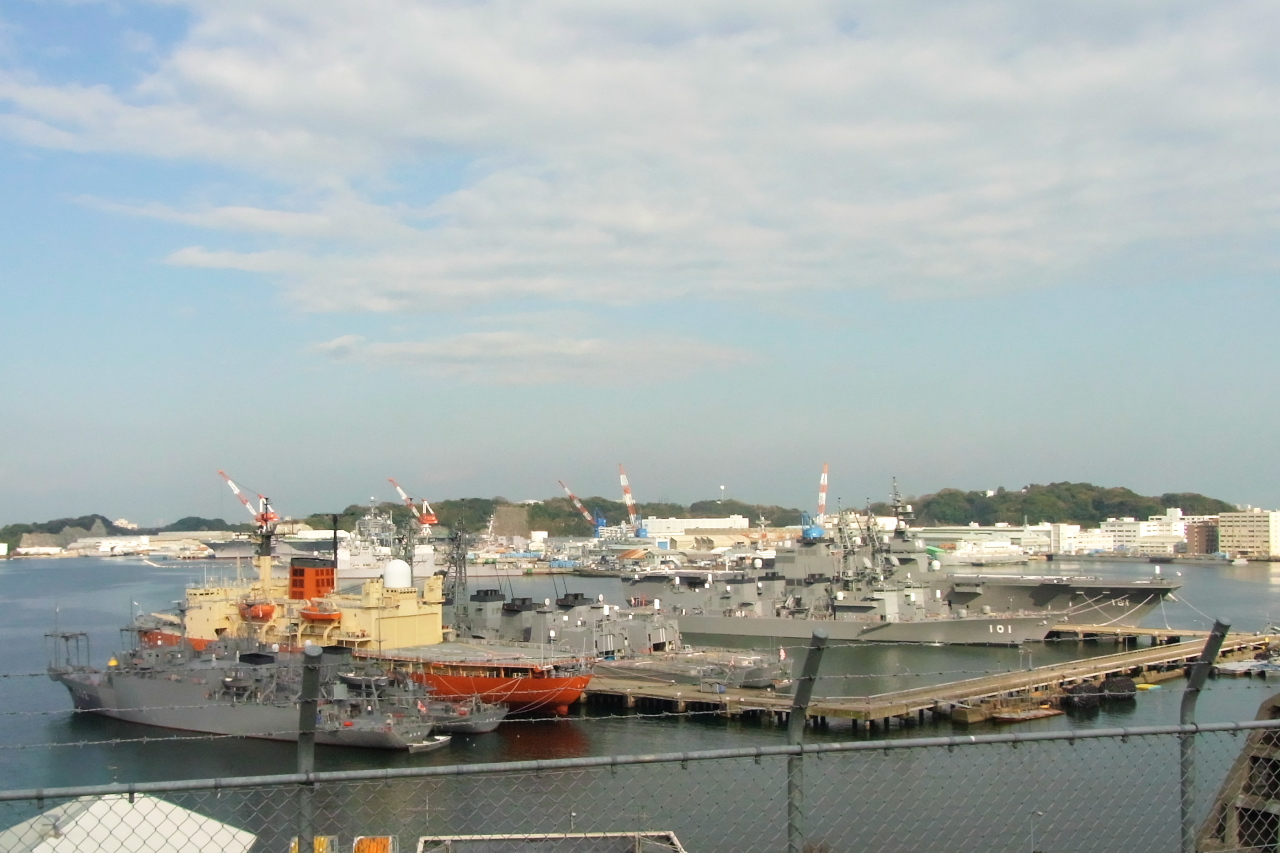
Yoshikura District

=== Yoshikura District ===
- Yokosuka District General Manager
  - Yokosuka Repair and Supply Station
- 1st Escort Flotilla Command
  - 1st Escort Squadron
- 2nd Escort Flotilla
  - 6th Escort Squadron
- Communications Command
  - Yokosuka System Communication Corps
- Maritime Self-Defense Force police force
  - Yokosuka District Police

=== Nagaura District ===
- Yokosuka Base Service Corps
- Yokosuka Sanitary Corps

=== Arai District ===
- Yokosuka District Force
  - Yokosuka Ammunition Maintenance Supply Station
  - Yokosuka Guard
- Fleet Escort Force
  - Maritime Training Guidance Group Command
- Fleet Submarine Command
  - Submarine Education and Training Corps

=== Kusugaura District ===
- Fleet Submarine Command
  - 2nd Submarine Squadron
- Oceanographic Command / Anti-submarine Support Group
  - Anti-submarine data corps
- Yokosuka District Force
  - Yokosuka Repair and Supply Station

=== Taura District ===
- Maritime Self-Defense Force 2nd Technical School
- Maritime Self-Defense Force Supply Headquarters
  - Maritime Self-Defense Force Ship Supply Office
- Maritime Self-Defense Force Diving Medical Experiment Corps
- Yokosuka District Force
  - Yokosuka Repair and Supply Station

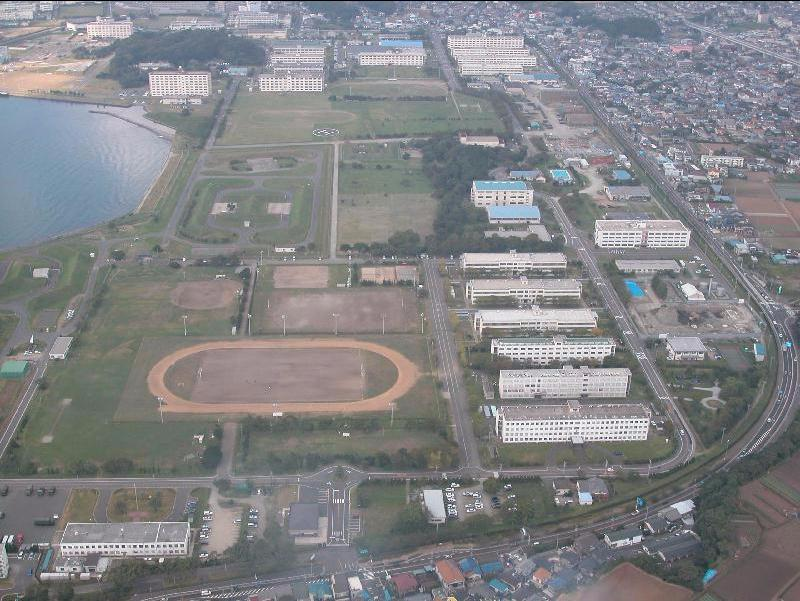
Takeyama District

=== Takeyama District ===
- Yokosuka District Force
- Yokosuka Education Corps
- Yokosuka Music Corps
- Yokosuka Sanitary Corps

=== Self-Defense Forces Yokosuka Hospital ===
- Self Defense Fleet
- Mine Warfare Force

== Gallery ==
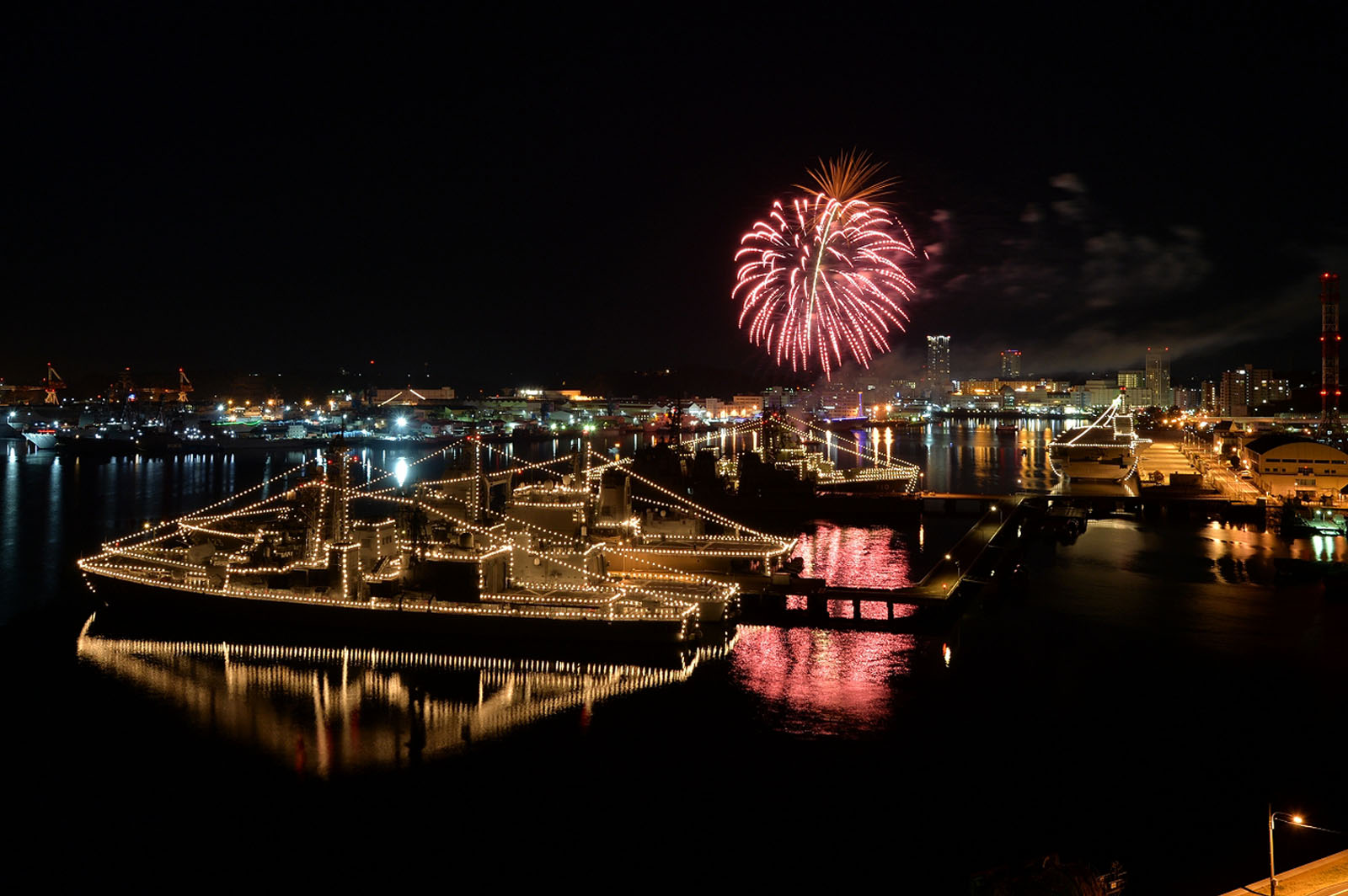
Overhead view of Funakoshi District at night

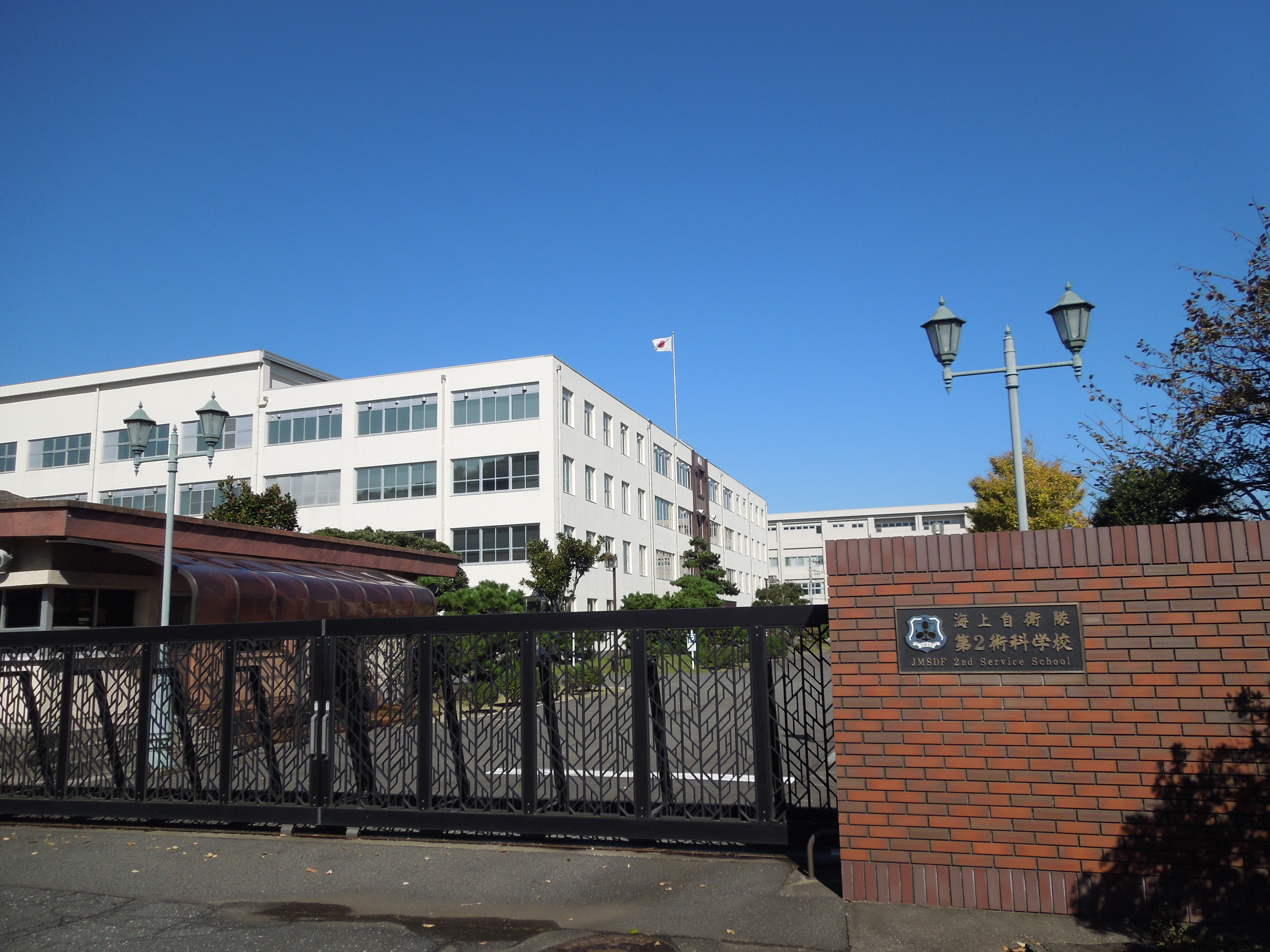
Main entrance of 2nd Service School

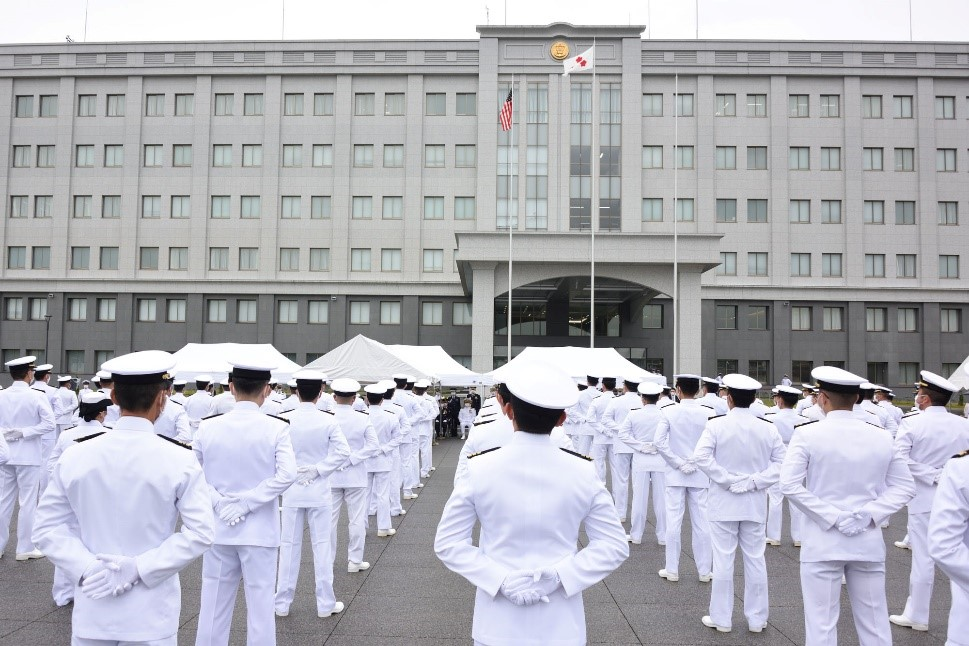
Maritime Operations Center in Yokosuka

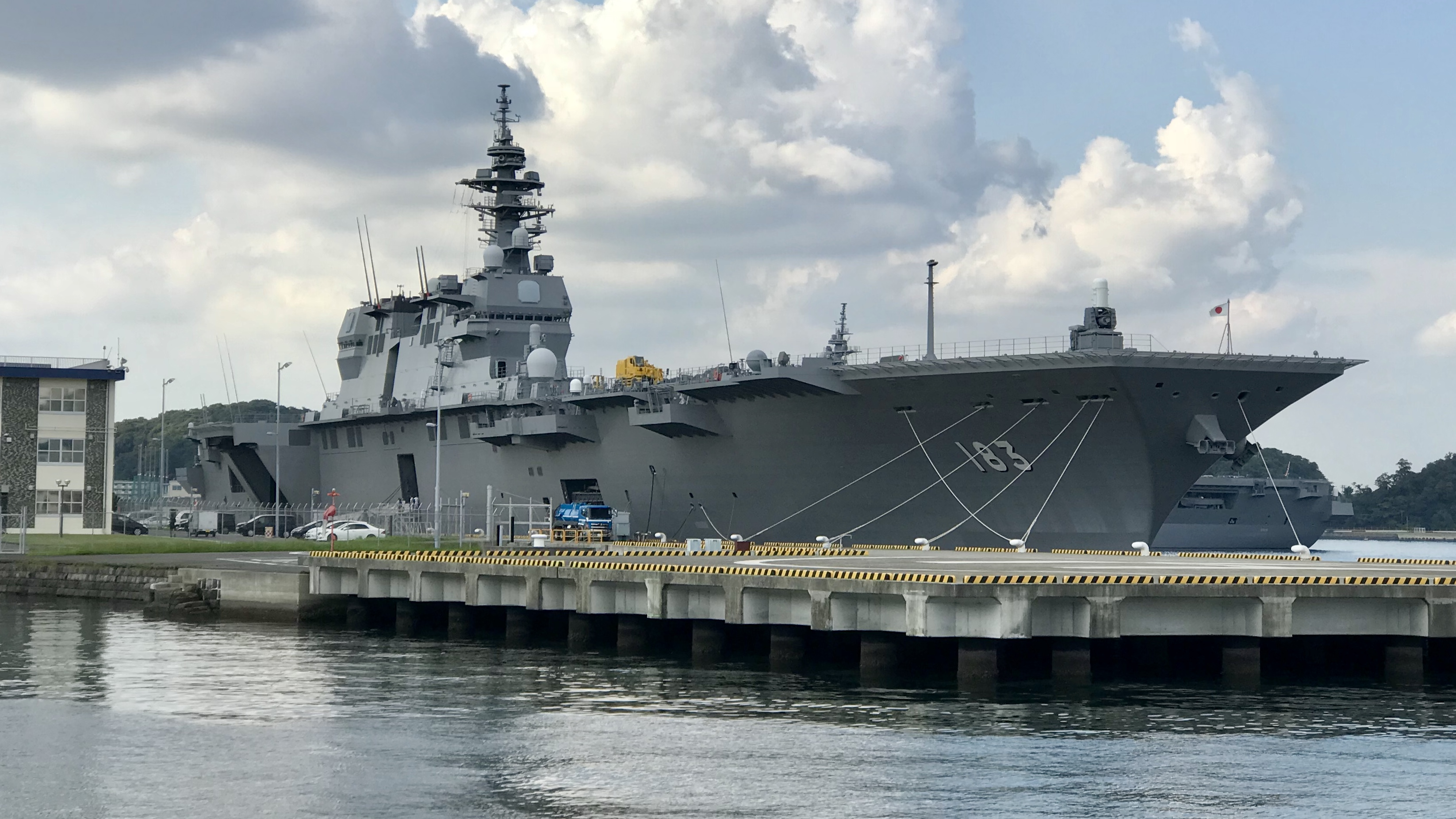
JS Izumo at Hemi Dock

== See also ==
- JMSDF Ōminato Base
