= Yasushi Matsushita =

Japanese admiral (born 1955)

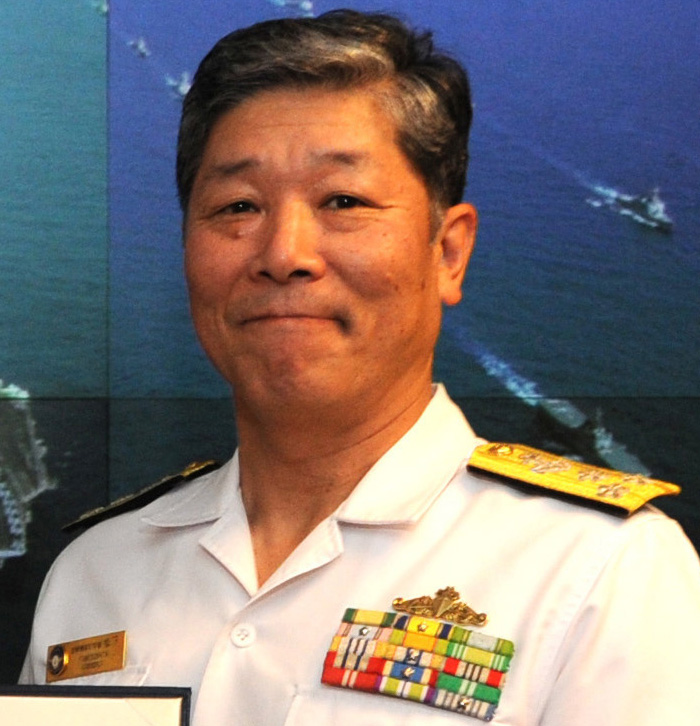
- Born: 1955 (age 70–71); Osaka Prefecture
- Military career
- Allegiance: Japan
- Branch: Japan Maritime Self-Defense Force
- Service years: ?-2014
- Rank: Admiral
- Commands: Commander of the Japan Self-Defense Forces
- Awards: See Awards

Admiral Yasushi Matsushita (松下泰士, Matsushita Yasushi; born 1955) is a Japanese naval officer who served as the Self Defense Fleet's Commander of the Japanese Maritime Self Defence Force (JMSDF) from 2012 to 2014. He is the 46th Commander of the Self-Defense Fleet, succeeding Katsutoshi Kawano. In 2014, he was succeeded by Eiichi Funada.

== Career ==
Born in Osaka Prefecture in 1955, he graduated from the National Defense Academy (22nd term). He later became the Commander of the 2nd Escort Group, Commander of the Training Squadron, Deputy Principal of the Maritime Self-Defense Force Executive School, Chief of the Sasebo District General Manager, Chief of the Self-Defense Fleet Command and Commander of the Escort Fleet.

On 26 July 2012, he became the 46th Commander of the Self-Defense Fleet.

On 27 March 2014, he was retired from the Navy and became an advisor to Mitsubishi Electric Corporation.

== Awards ==
2nd Defensive Memorial Cordon

3rd Defensive Memorial Cordon

10th Defensive Memorial Cordon

11th Defensive Memorial Cordon

13th Defensive Memorial Cordon

18th Defensive Memorial Cordon

19th Defensive Memorial Cordon

20th Defensive Memorial Cordon

21st Defensive Memorial Cordon

22nd Defensive Memorial Cordon

26th Defensive Memorial Cordon

32nd Defensive Memorial Cordon

33rd Defensive Memorial Cordon

36th Defensive Memorial Cordon

41st Defensive Memorial Cordon

Legion of Merit

== See also ==
- Japanese military ranks
