= Yuasa =

Yuasa may refer to:

== People ==
- Ami Yuasa (湯浅 亜実, born 1998), Japanese breakdancer
- Hatsue Yuasa (湯浅 初枝, 1902–after 1943), Japanese operatic singer
- Hideki Yuasa (湯浅 秀樹, born 1964), Japanese naval officer
- Joji Yuasa (湯浅 譲二, 1929–2024), Japanese composer
- Ken Yuasa (湯浅 謙, 1916–2005), Japanese military surgeon
- Baron Yuasa Kurahei (湯浅 倉平, 1874–1940), Japanese politician and bureaucrat
- Masaaki Yuasa (湯浅 政明, born 1965), Japanese film director
- Naoki Yuasa (湯浅 直樹, born 1983), Japanese alpine ski racer
- Noriaki Yuasa (湯浅 憲明, 1933–2004), Japanese film director
- Rikako Yuasa (湯浅 麗歌, born 1991), submission grappler and Brazilian jiu-jitsu (BJJ) black belt competitor
- Takashi Yuasa (湯浅 卓, born 1955), Japanese lawyer
- Takuo Yuasa (湯浅 卓雄, born 1949), Japanese musician and conductor
- Toshiko Yuasa (湯浅 年子, 1909– 1980), Japanese nuclear physicist
- Toshio Yuasa (湯浅 利夫, born 1935), former Grand Steward of the Imperial Household Agency (2001–2005)
- Yasuo Yuasa (湯浅 泰雄, 1925–2005), Japanese philosopher of religion
- Yoshiko Yuasa (湯浅 芳子, 1896–1990), Japanese scholar and translator of Russian literature

== Places ==
- Yuasa, Wakayama, Japan
- Yuasa Station, railway station at Yuasa, Wakayama

== Other uses ==
- GS Yuasa, a Japanese company
