= Eiichi Funada =

Japanese admiral (born 1955)

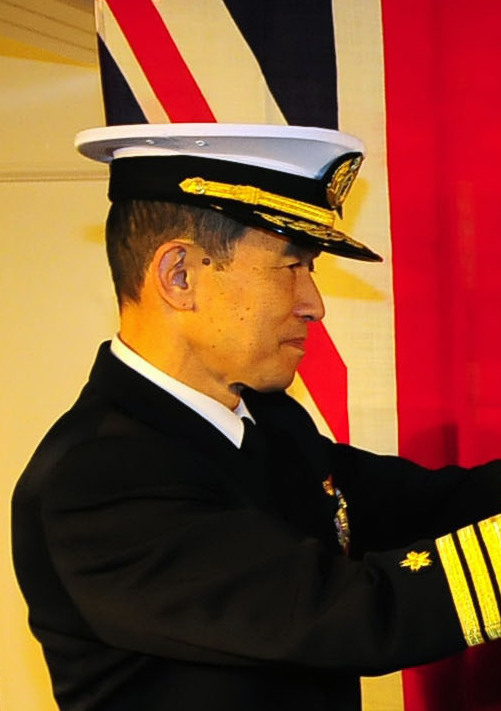
- Born: 6 December 1955 (age 70); Tokyo
- Military career
- Allegiance: Japan
- Branch: Japan Maritime Self-Defense Force
- Service years: 1980–2015
- Rank: Admiral
- Commands: Commander of the Self Defense Fleet; Vice Chief of Staff, Maritime Staff Office; Commander of Air Training Command; Commander of the 22nd Air Group; Commander of the 1st Air Group
- Awards: See Awards

Admiral Eiichi Funada (鮒田英一, Funada Eiichi; born 6 December 1955) is a retired Japanese naval officer who served as Commander of the Self Defense Fleet of the Japan Maritime Self-Defense Force (JMSDF) from 2014 to 2015. He was the 47th Commander of the Self-Defense Fleet, succeeding Yasushi Matsushita, and was himself succeeded in 2015 by Yasuhiro Shigeoka.

== Early life and education ==
Funada was born in Tokyo on 6 December 1955. He attended Tokyo Metropolitan Toyama High School before studying at the Faculty of Law of the University of Tokyo, graduating in March 1979. In April 1980 he joined the Maritime Self-Defense Force as a member of the 31st class of general officer candidates, a class considered equivalent to the 24th class of the National Defense Academy.

In 1992, while a mid-career officer, he obtained a Master of Public Administration degree from Harvard University's John F. Kennedy School of Government, as a member of its Mid-Career Master in Public Administration (MC/MPA) programme.

== Career ==
Funada served for most of his early career in maritime patrol aviation units and at the Maritime Staff Office. He was promoted to lieutenant commander (2nd class kaisa) in July 1994, and in March 1996 was posted to the Personnel Division of the Personnel and Education Department at the Maritime Staff Office. In August 1998 he became deputy commander of the 5th Air Group, and in January 1999 was promoted to captain (1st class kaisa).

From June 2000 he served in the Defense Division of the Defense Department at the Maritime Staff Office, becoming chief of that division's organisation section in January 2001. In August 2002 he took command of the 1st Air Group. From July 2003 he served at the Joint Staff Council, as defence planning coordinator and concurrently head of its general affairs section.

On 28 July 2005, Funada was promoted to rear admiral (kaisho-ho) and given command of the 22nd Air Group. On 28 March 2007 he became chief of staff of the Maizuru District, and on 1 December 2008 was appointed inspector general at the Maritime Staff Office. On 21 July 2009 he became director of the Maritime Staff Office's Personnel and Education Department.

On 5 August 2011, he was promoted to admiral (kaisho) and appointed Commander of Air Training Command. On 26 July 2012 he became Vice Chief of Staff of the Maritime Staff Office, and on 28 March 2014 he was appointed the 47th Commander of the Self-Defense Fleet. He retired from the JMSDF on 4 August 2015, after roughly a year and a half in the post.

== Awards ==
2nd Defensive Memorial Cordon

3rd Defensive Memorial Cordon

9th Defensive Memorial Cordon

11th Defensive Memorial Cordon

16th Defensive Memorial Cordon

18th Defensive Memorial Cordon

19th Defensive Memorial Cordon

20th Defensive Memorial Cordon

21st Defensive Memorial Cordon

26th Defensive Memorial Cordon

27th Defensive Memorial Cordon

32nd Defensive Memorial Cordon

33rd Defensive Memorial Cordon

36th Defensive Memorial Cordon

41st Defensive Memorial Cordon

== See also ==
- Japanese military ranks
- Self Defense Fleet
