= Katsuhito Yokokume =

Japanese politician

- 横粂 勝仁
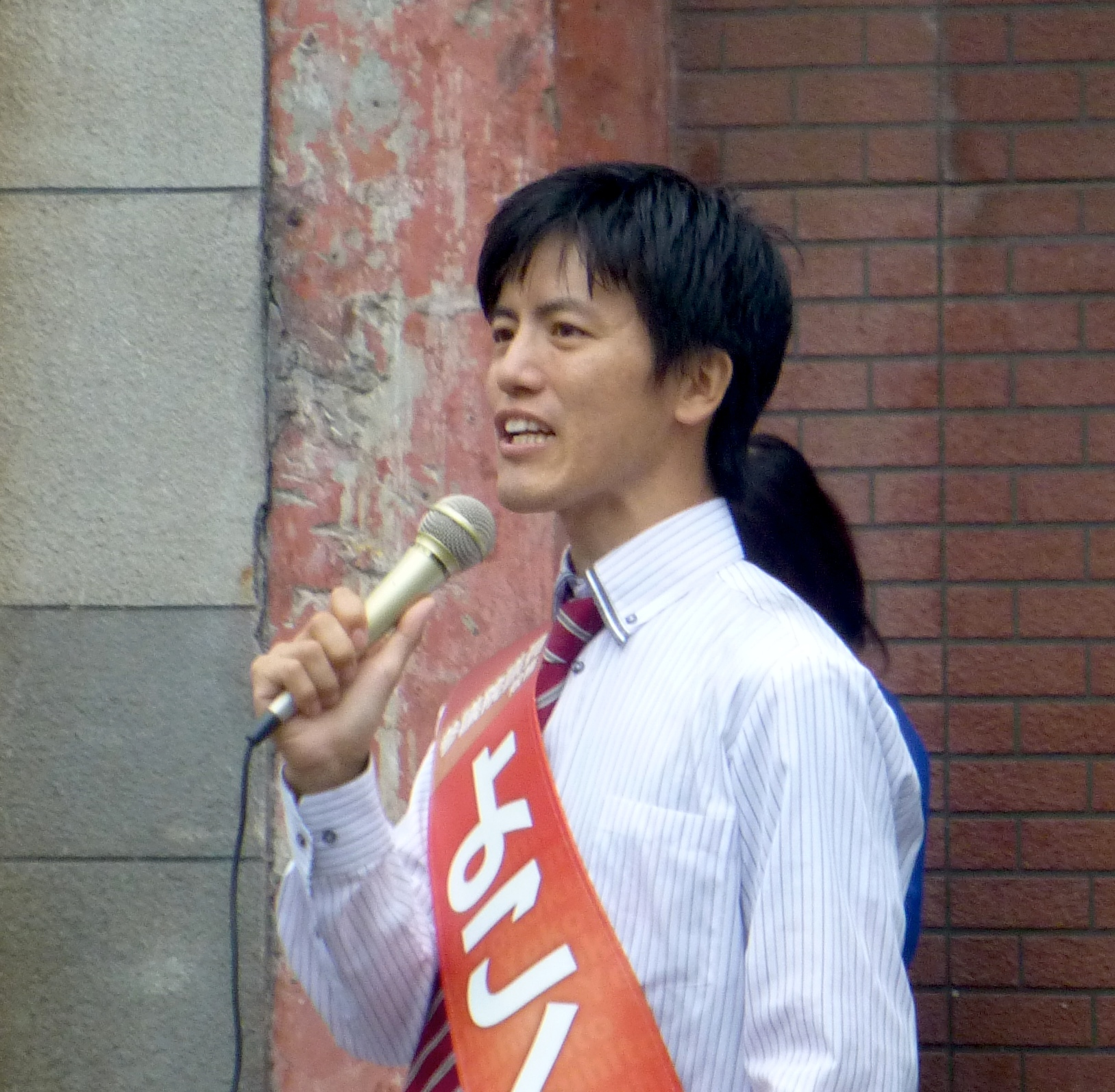
- Yokokume in 2016

Member of the House of Representatives
- In office 30 August 2009 – 16 November 2012
- Constituency: Southern Kanto PR

Personal details
- Born: 10 September 1981 (age 45) Toyota, Aichi, Japan
- Party: Independent
- Other political affiliations: Democratic (2009–2011)
- Education: University of Tokyo
- Occupation: Lawyer
- Website: yokokume.org

Katsuhito Yokokume (横粂 勝仁, Yokokume Katsuhito; born 10 September 1981) is a Japanese lawyer and former politician.

== Biography ==
Katsuhito Yokokume was born on 10 September 1981 in Toyota, Aichi, the son of a truck driver. he studied law at Tokyo University, graduating in March 2005. He passed the bar exam in November 2005.

In 2006, he appeared on the Ainori TV show as a participant.

In August 2009, he was elected as a member of the House of Representatives, representing the Southern Kantō proportional representation block on the DPJ list. He failed to win Kanagawa 11th district against the incumbent's son Shinjirō Koizumi, but was able to win a seat in the PR block. Yokukume resigned from the DPJ in May 2011.

He ran against former Prime Minister Naoto Kan in his district in the 2012 election, finishing in the third place. In the 2016 House of Councillors election, he contested for a seat in the Tokyo at-large district as an independent. Yokukume managed to garner more than 300,000 votes but failed to gain a seat. He announced his retirement from politics after his loss.
