= Hideki Yuasa =

Japanese admiral (born 1964)

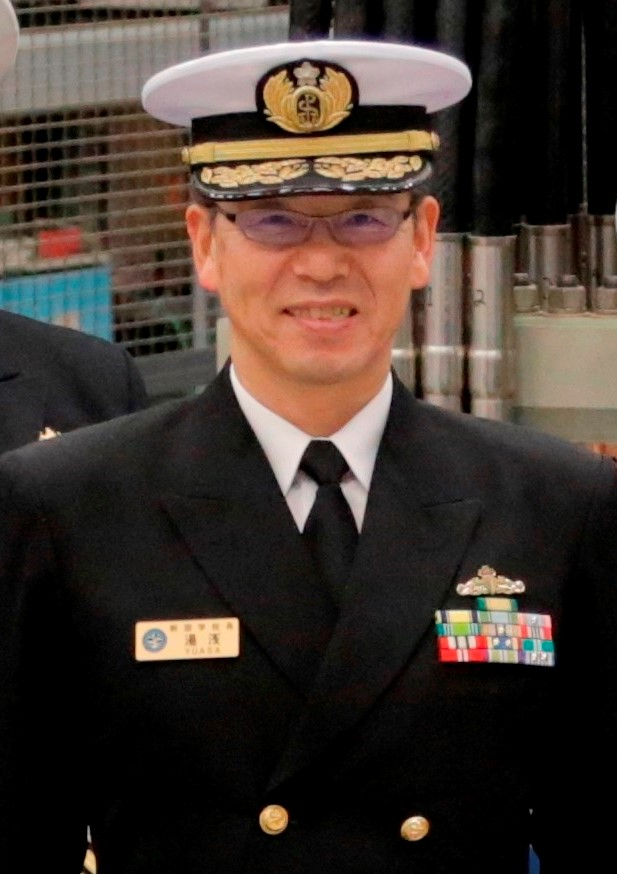
- Born: 3 February 1964 (age 62); Tokushima Prefecture
- Military career
- Allegiance: Japan
- Branch: Japan Maritime Self-Defense Force
- Service years: 1986–2022
- Rank: Admiral
- Commands: Commander of the Self Defense Fleet; Commander of the Escort Fleet; Captain of JS Mineyuki; Commander of the 14th Escort Division; Commander of the 2nd Escort Flotilla; Commander of the Mine Warfare Force
- Awards: See Awards; Chevalier of the Legion of Honour (2022)

Admiral Hideki Yuasa (湯浅秀樹, Yuasa Hideki; born 3 February 1964) is a retired Japanese naval officer who served as Commander of the Self Defense Fleet of the Japan Maritime Self-Defense Force (JMSDF) from 25 August 2020 until his retirement on 23 December 2022. He was the 51st Commander of the Self-Defense Fleet, succeeding Hiroyuki Kasui.

== Career ==
Yuasa was born in Tokushima Prefecture in February 1964. In March 1986, he graduated from the 30th class of the National Defense Academy, where he studied electrical engineering, and joined the Maritime Self-Defense Force. His branch specialisation was surface warfare.

In July 2000, he was promoted to lieutenant commander (2nd class kaisa).

In March 2001, he worked at the Equipment System Division of the Maritime Staff Office.

In August 2002, he was assigned to the role of Captain aboard destroyer Mineyuki.

In August 2003, he joined the National Institute for Defense Studies staff.

In July 2004, he worked in the Assistant Division of the Maritime Staff Office.

In January 2005, he was promoted to commander (1st class kaisa).

In August 2007, he worked at the Equipment System Division, Maritime Staff Office. In December of the same year, he was assigned to the Maritime Staff Office Equipment System Division Ship System Group Leader.

In March 2008, he was assigned to the role of Commander of the 14th Escort Division.

In March 2010, General Manager, Deputy Division, Personnel Education Department, Maritime Staff Office. In August of the same year, Assistant Manager, Personnel Education Department, Maritime Staff Office.

In December 2011, he was promoted to Rear Admiral and became Commander of the 2nd Escort Flotilla. During his tenure, he served in 2013 as the Self-Defense Forces' training controller for the "Dawn Blitz 13" joint exercise with United States forces.

In December 2013, he was the Training Squadron Commander.

In December 2014, Director of Training Department, National Defense Academy.

In March 2016, he became Commander of the Mine Warfare Force; during his tenure the force's amphibious warfare units were reorganised, including the transfer of the 1st Transport Division under its command in July 2016.

In December 2017, he was promoted to admiral (kaisho) and appointed Commandant of the Maritime Self-Defense Force Command and Staff College.

In April 2019, he became the 39th Commander of the Escort Fleet.

On 25 August 2020, he was appointed the 51st Commander of the Self-Defense Fleet.

On 2 June 2022, in recognition of his contribution to strengthening Franco-Japanese defence cooperation, he was made a Chevalier of the Legion of Honour by Philippe Setton, the French Ambassador to Japan. According to the French Embassy, Yuasa had worked since 2011 to advance bilateral defence cooperation in operations, officer education and personnel exchange, and had contributed to joint exercises including "ARC17" (2017), "La Pérouse" (2019 and 2021) and "ARC21" (2021).

He retired from the JMSDF on 23 December 2022.

== Awards ==
3rd Defensive Memorial Cordon

7th Defensive Memorial Cordon

10th Defensive Memorial Cordon

11th Defensive Memorial Cordon

18th Defensive Memorial Cordon

19th Defensive Memorial Cordon

22nd Defensive Memorial Cordon

21st Defensive Memorial Cordon

26th Defensive Memorial Cordon

32nd Defensive Memorial Cordon

33rd Defensive Memorial Cordon

37th Defensive Memorial Cordon

41st Defensive Memorial Cordon

Chevalier of the Legion of Honour (France, 2022)

== See also ==
- Japanese military ranks
- Self Defense Fleet
