= JMSDF Ōminato Naval Base =

Naval base in Aomori Prefecture, Japan

Ōminato Naval Base
- 大湊基地
- Part of Ōminato District Force
- Mutsu, Aomori Prefecture in Japan
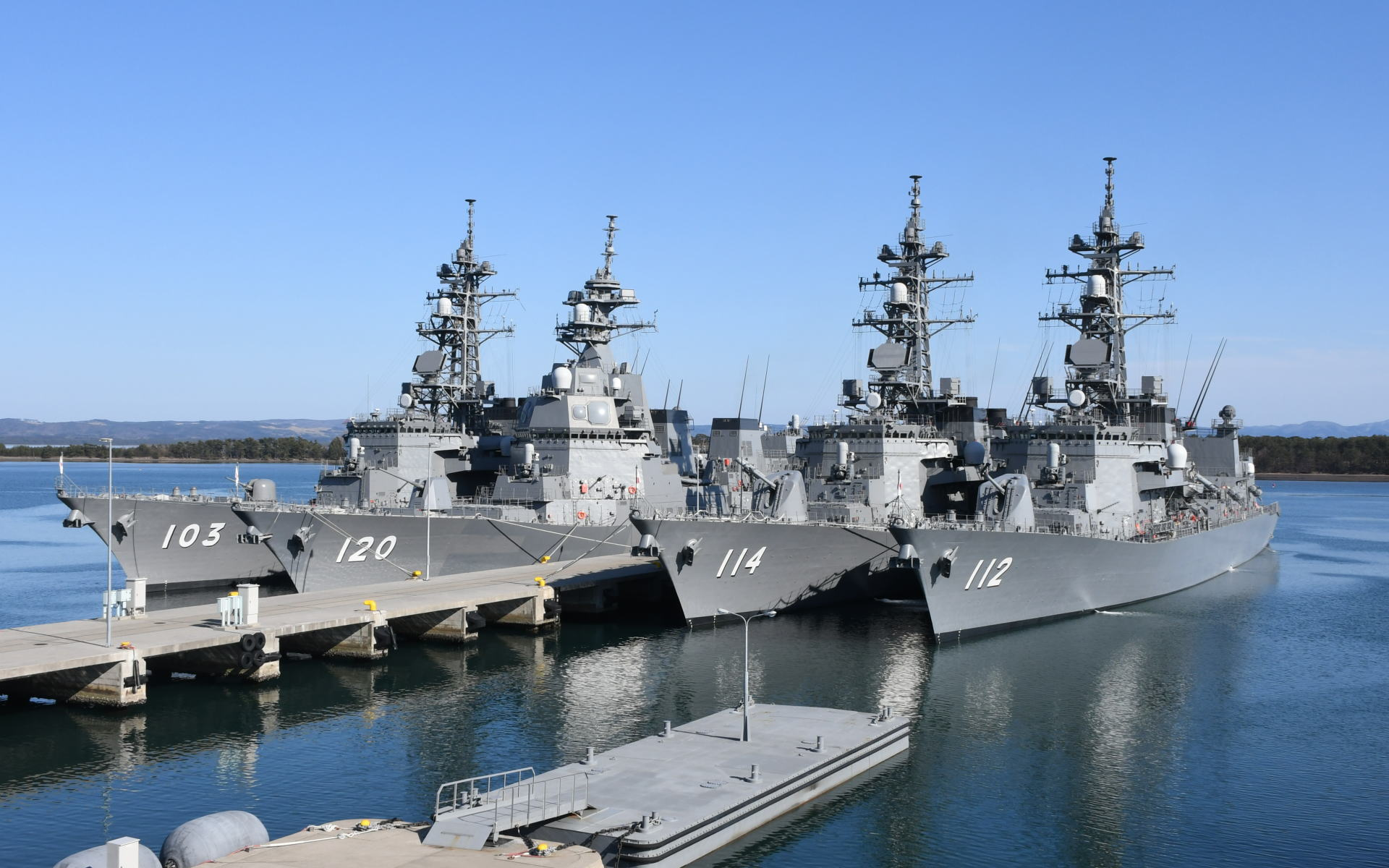

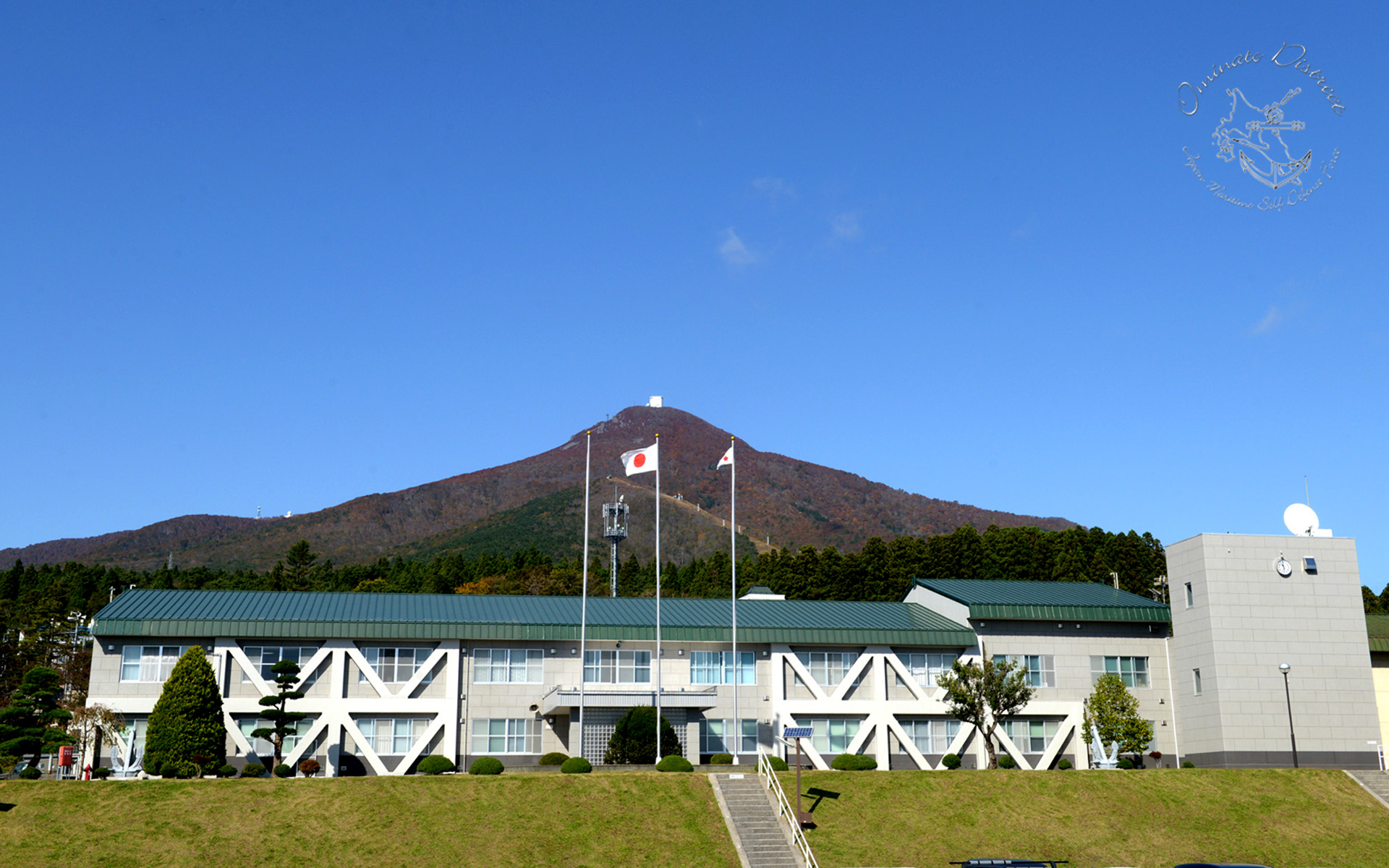

Site information
- Type: Naval base
- Owner: Japanese Maritime Self-Defense Force
- Operator: Japan Maritime Self-Defense Force
- Website: www.mod.go.jp/msdf/oominato/

Location
- Coordinates: 41°13′58″N 141°07′56″E

Site history
- Built: 16 September 1953
- In use: 1953

Garrison information
- Occupants: Self Defense Fleet; Fleet Air Force; Ōminato District Force

The JMSDF Ōminato Naval Base (大湊基地, Ōminato Kichi) is a Japan Maritime Self-Defense Force naval base with port and military aerodrome (ICAO: RJSO) facilities. It is located on Mutsu Bay in the city of Mutsu in the Aomori Prefecture, in extreme northern Honshū, Japan.

== History ==
On 16 September 1953, the Ōminato District Force was newly formed by the National Safety Agency Coastal Safety Force, the predecessor of the Maritime Self-Defense Force.

On 20 January 1954, the Ōminato Garrison was newly established.

On 9 August 1960, the Self-Defense Forces Ōminato Hospital was opened.

On 15 August 1962, the Ōminato Garrison abolished.

Late of March 2021, with the strengthening of the functions of the Self-Defense Forces Yokosuka Hospital, the Self-Defense Forces Ōminato Hospital would be abolished and reduced to a clinic.

== Facilities ==
Facilities in Ōminato Naval Base includes:

- Ōminato District Force
- Ōminato Communications Command
- Ōminato Coastal Safety Force
- Ōminato Base Operations Corps
- Ōminato Music Corps
- Ōminato Medic
- Ōminato District Police
- Ōminato Repair Supply Station
- Ōminato Ammunition Maintenance Supply Station
- Self-Defense Force Ōminato Hospital
- Fleet Escort Force
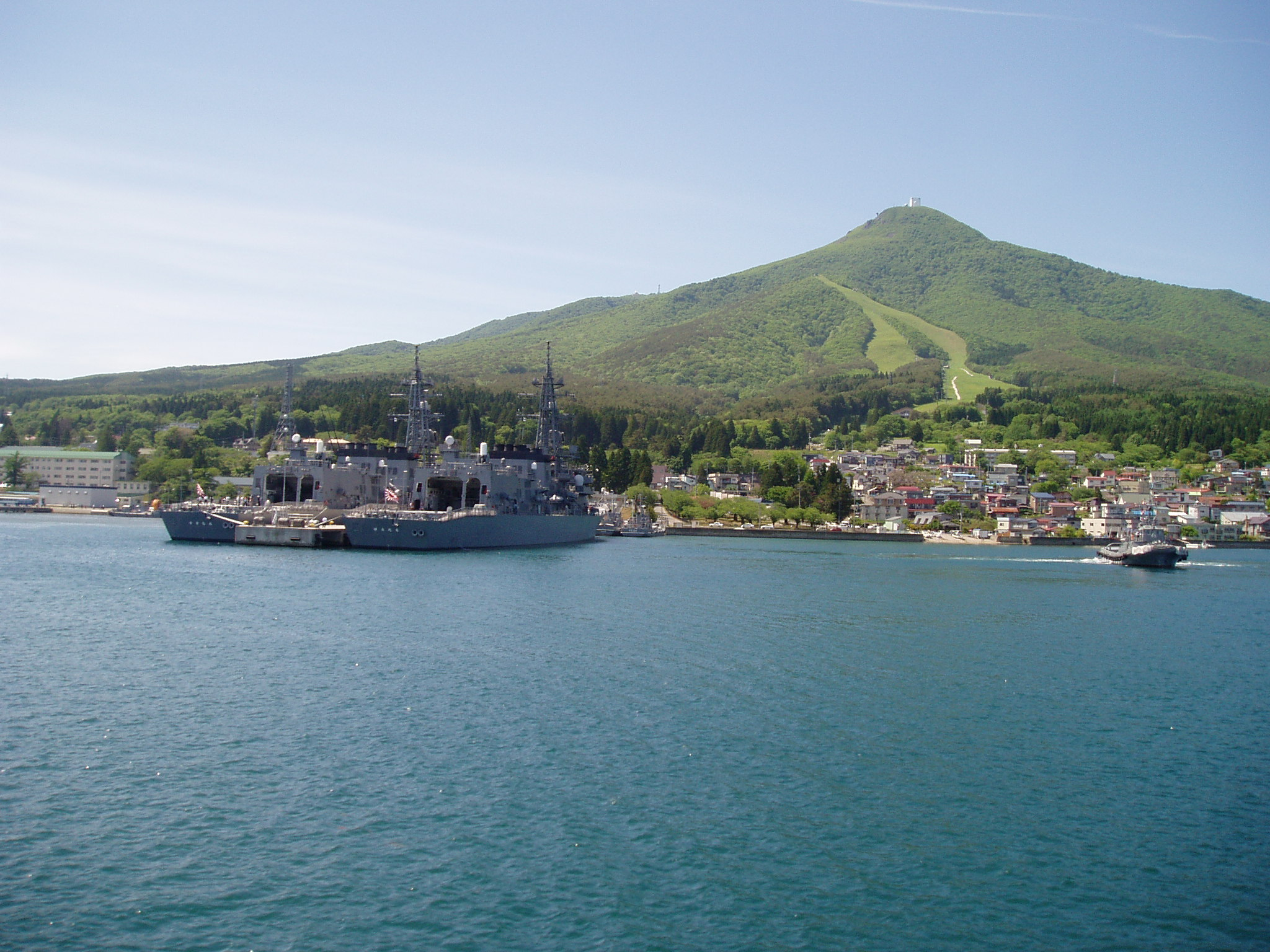
Panorama of JMSDF Ōminato Base

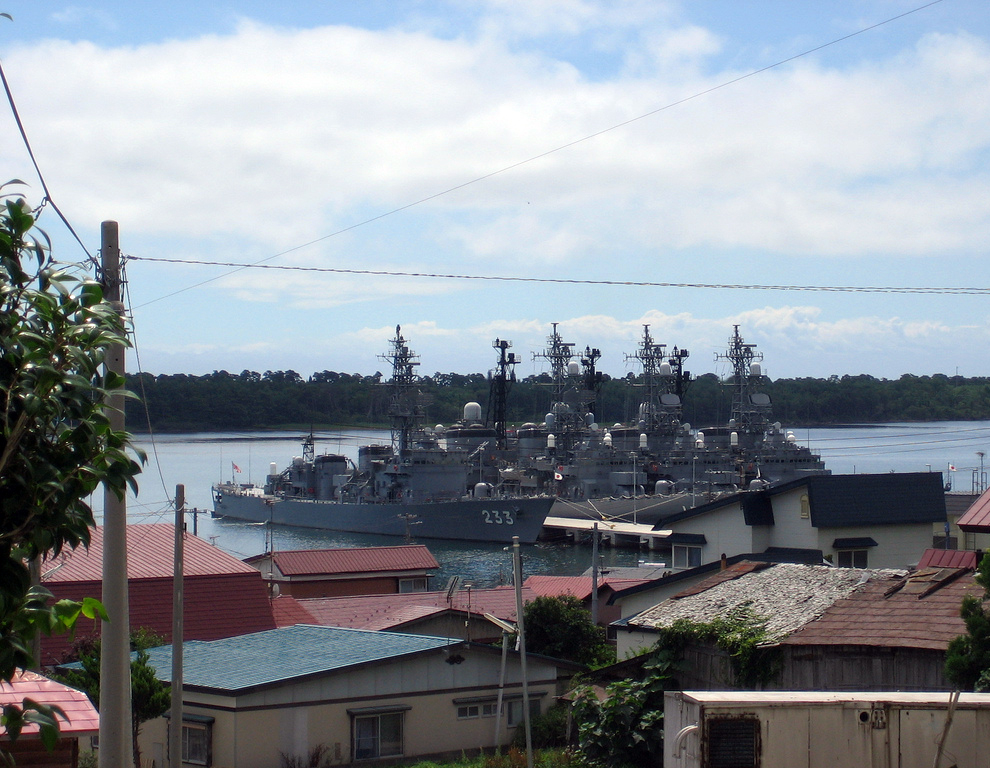
JS Chikuma and three Asagiri class destroyers at Ōminato

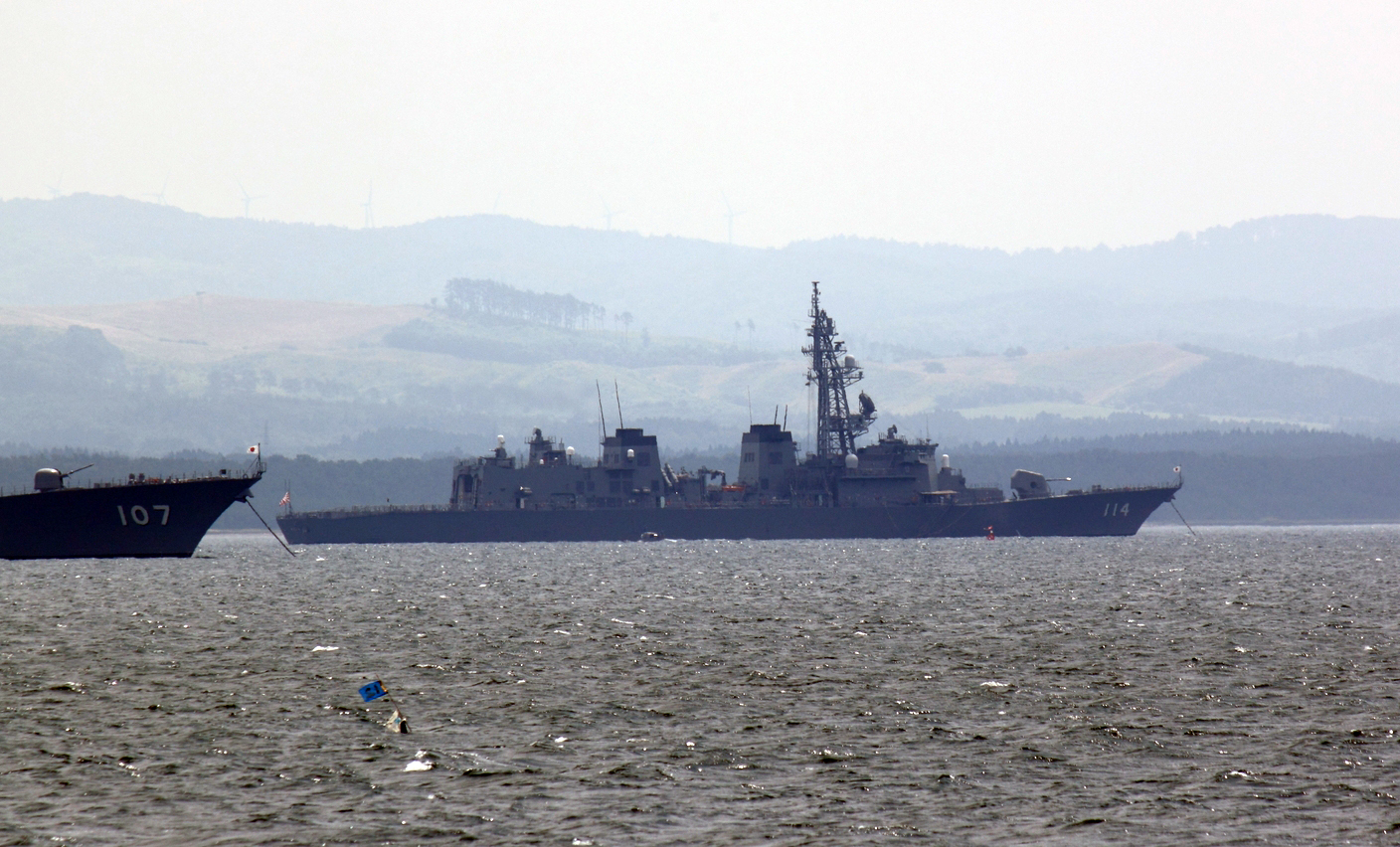
JS Suzunami anchored off Ōminato

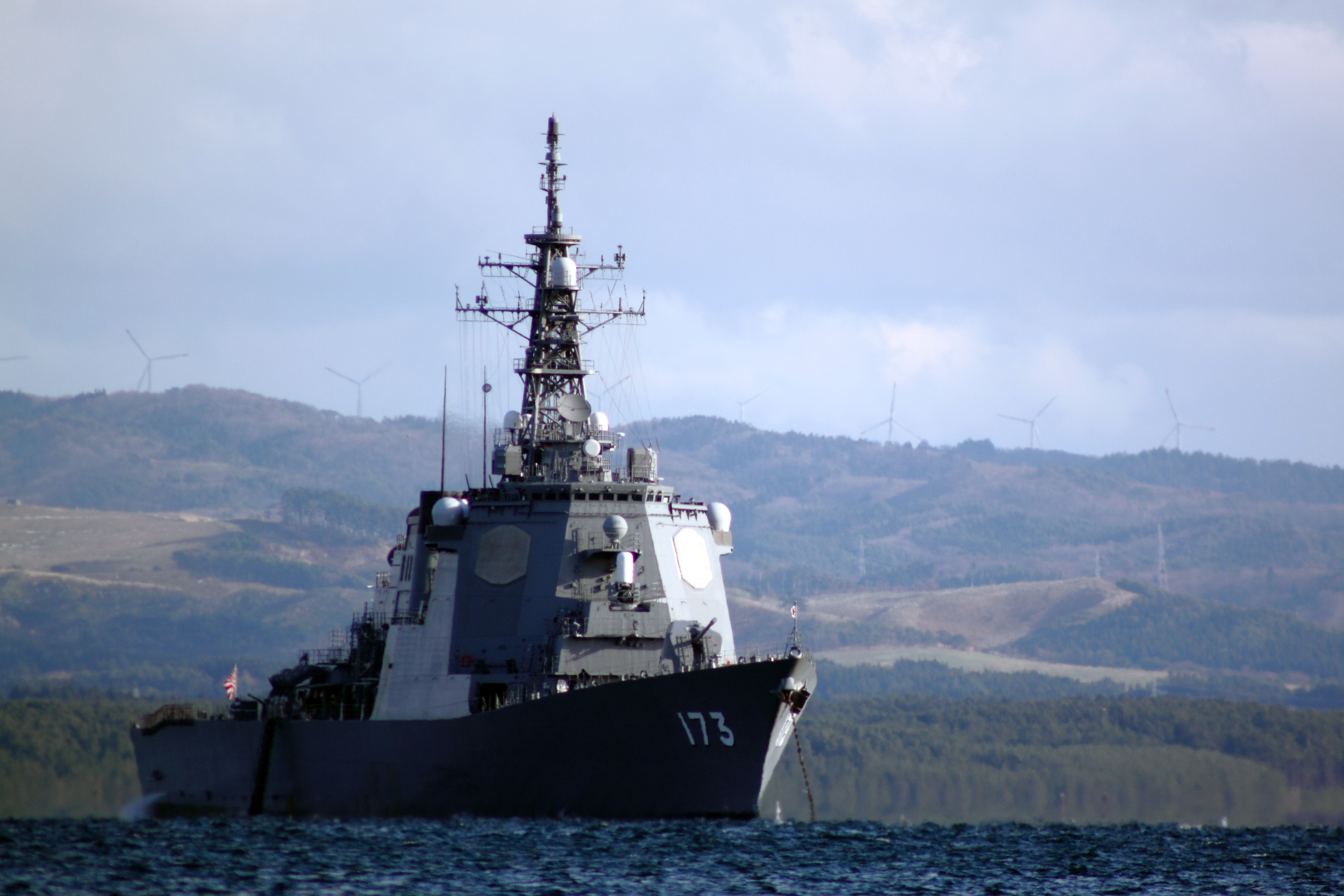
JS Kongō anchored off Ōminato

== Ōminato Air Base ==
Ōminato Air Field 大湊航空基地
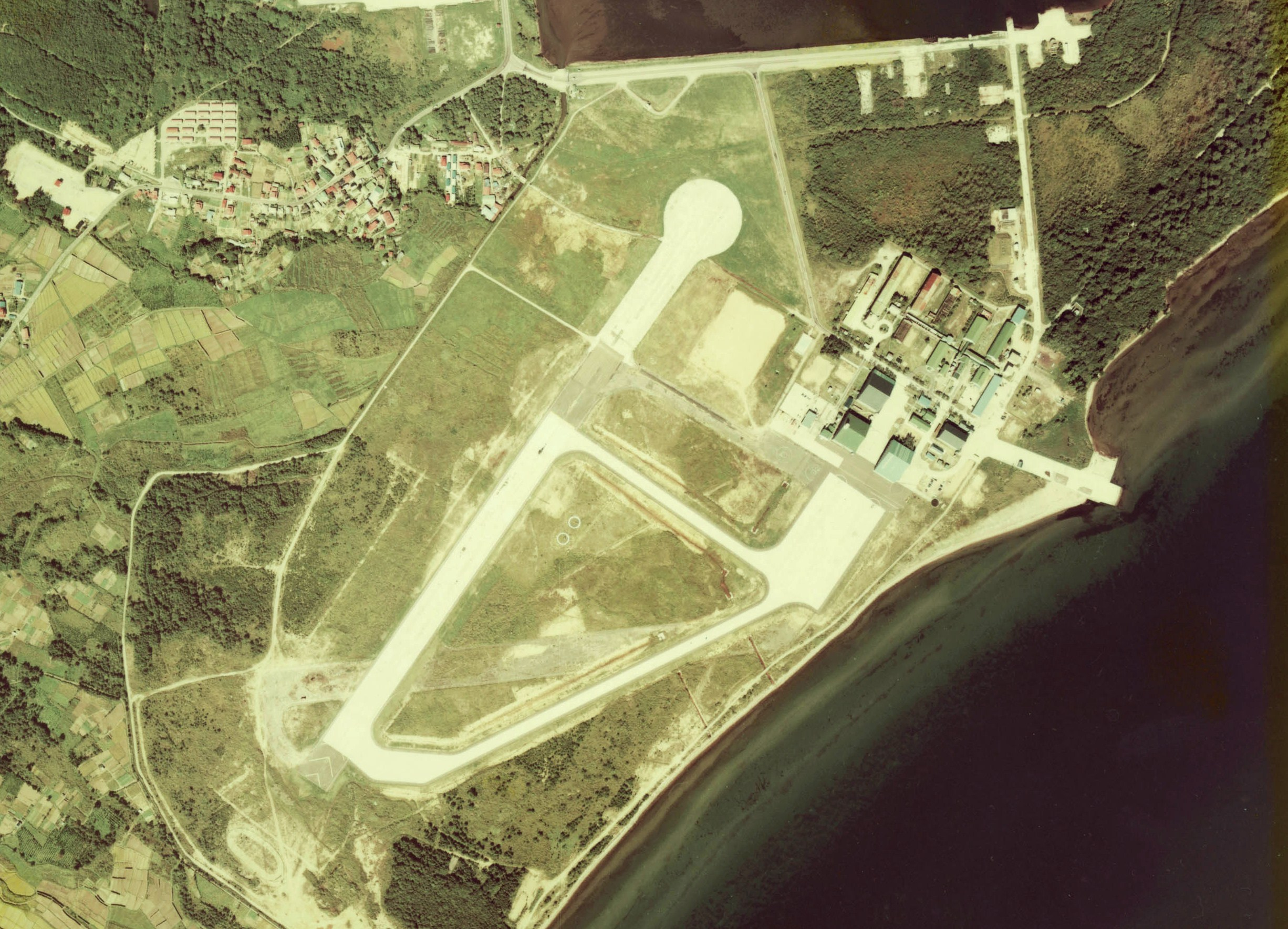
- IATA: none; ICAO: RJSO

Summary
- Airport type: Military
- Elevation AMSL: 24 ft (7.3 m)
- Interactive map of Ōminato Air Field

Runways
Direction	Length		Surface
Direction	m	ft	Surface
04/22	600	1,969	Concrete
- Source: Japanese AIP at AIS Japan

The base is currently home for the JMSDF 25th Squadron equipped with Sikorsky SH-60 Seahawk helicopters configured for the anti-submarine warfare role, and assigned to patrols of the Tsugaru Strait. It is also a base of operations for a flight of Sikorsky UH-60 Black Hawk utility helicopters from the JMSDF 73rd Squadron at Tateyama Air Base.

=== History ===
On 16 May 1956, Ōminato Air Corps was formed under the control of the Ōminato District Force.

On 26 March 2008, the Ōminato Air Corps was incorporated into the 21st Air Group under the control of the Air Force and reorganized into the 25th Air Group. The 73rd Air Group Ominato Air Detachment was a new edition.

On 2 April 2018, the 73rd Air Group of Ōminato Air Detachment was abolished.

=== Units ===
The whole air base was under the 25th Air Corps.

- Corps General Affairs Office
- Corporal Chief's Office
- Corps staff room
- 251st Squadron: SH-60J / SH-60K (call sign "BATTLEAX")
- 251st Maintenance Supply Corps
- Ōminato Air Base Corps
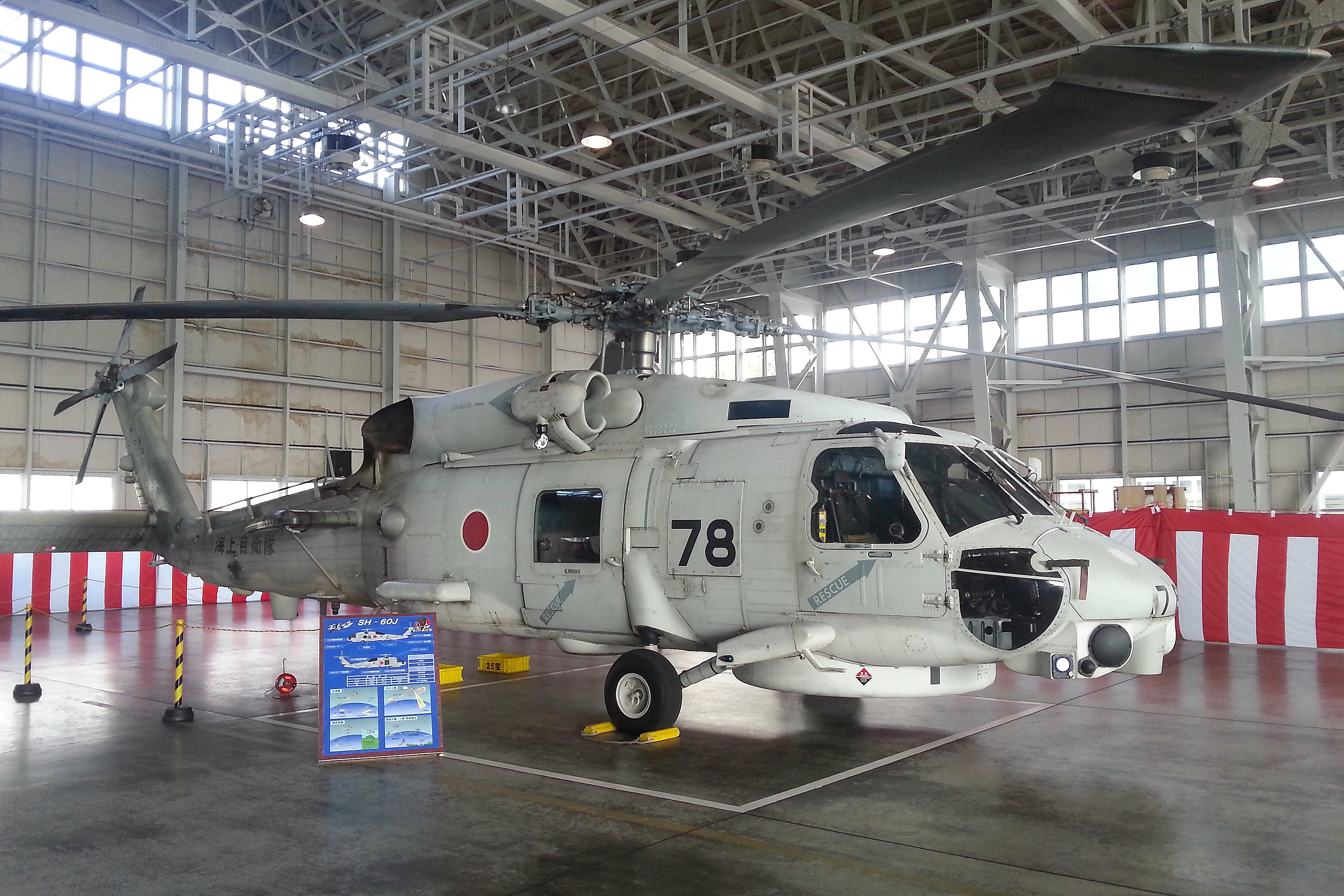
SH-60J inside Ōminato Air Base hangar

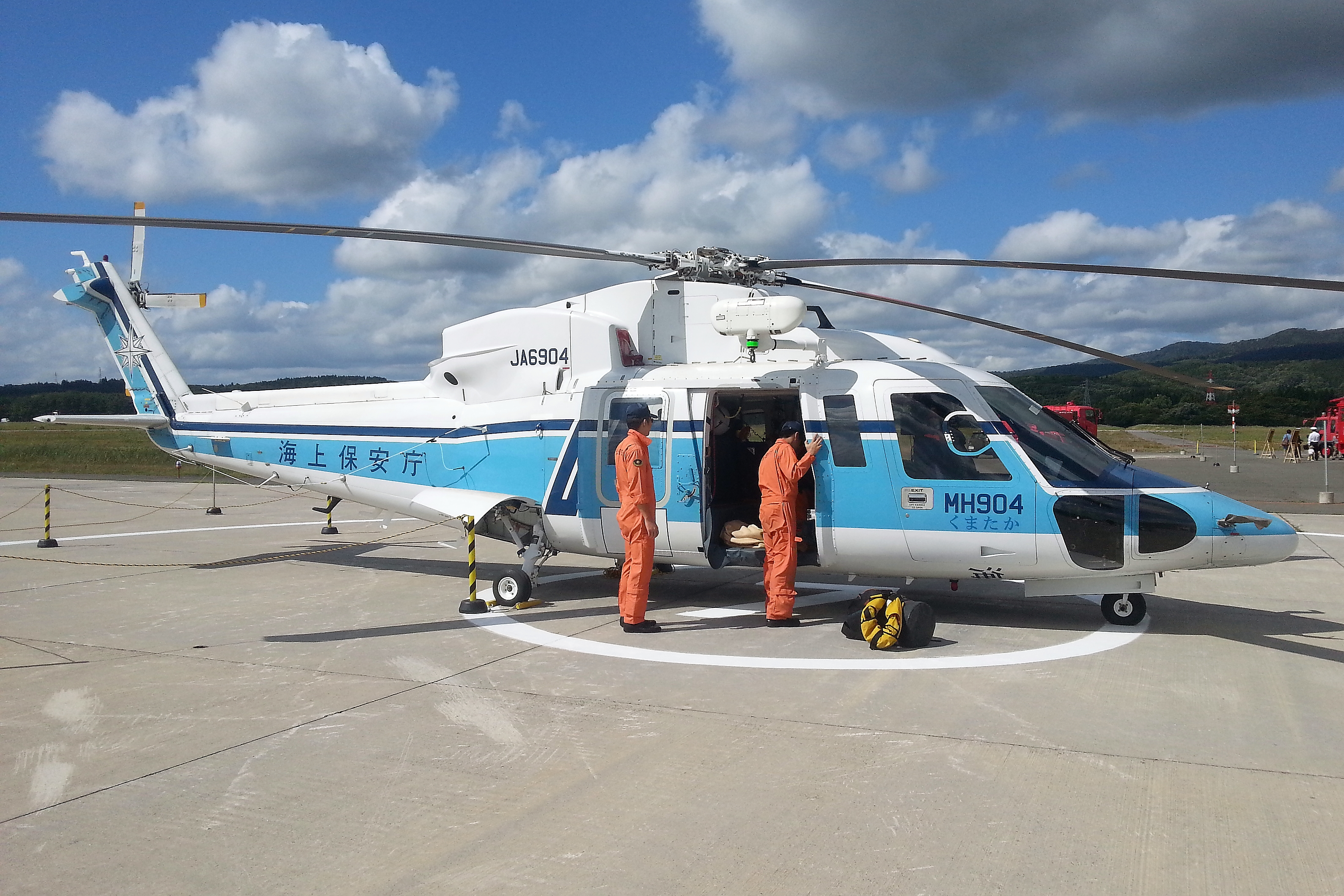
Japan Coast Guard S-76C at Ōminato
