= Hiroyuki Kasui =

Japanese admiral (born 1963)

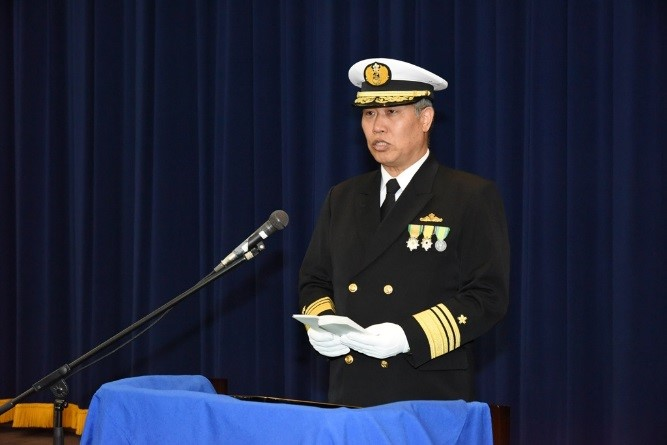
- Born: 15 January 1963 (age 63); Aichi Prefecture
- Military career
- Allegiance: Japan
- Branch: Japan Maritime Self-Defense Force
- Service years: 1985–2020
- Rank: Admiral
- Commands: Commander of the Self Defense Fleet; Captain of JS Chikuma; Commander of the 1st Escort Flotilla; Commander of the 38th Escort Fleet
- Awards: See Awards

Admiral Hiroyuki Kasui (糟井裕之, Kasui Hiroyuki; born 15 January 1963) is a retired Japanese naval officer who served as Commander of the Self Defense Fleet of the Japan Maritime Self-Defense Force (JMSDF) from 2019 to 2020. He was the 50th Commander of the Self-Defense Fleet, succeeding Kazuki Yamashita, and was himself succeeded in 2020 by Hideki Yuasa.

== Career ==
Kasui was born in Aichi Prefecture. In March 1985, he graduated from the 29th class of the National Defense Academy, where he studied mechanical engineering, and joined the Maritime Self-Defense Force.

In January 1996, he was promoted to lieutenant (3rd class kaisa).

In July 1999, he was promoted to lieutenant commander (2nd class kaisa).

On 1 August 2001, he became Commanding Officer of the destroyer Chikuma.

On 6 August 2002, he was posted to the Equipment System Division, Defense Department, Maritime Staff Office.

On 1 January 2004, he was promoted to commander (1st class kaisa).

On 1 August 2005, he became group leader of the Business Planning Group in the Defense Division, Defense Department, Maritime Staff Office, while concurrently serving at the Maritime Self-Defense Force Command and Staff College.

On 1 October 2007, he became Commander of the 7th Escort Division.

On 26 March 2008, he became Commander of the 4th Escort Division; on 1 December of the same year, he became Deputy Chief of the Appointments Section, Personnel and Education Department, Maritime Staff Office.

On 26 July 2010, he was promoted to rear admiral (kaisho-ho). On 20 August, he became Commander of the 1st Escort Flotilla. During his tenure, he served as officiating commander of the first-ever joint Japan-India naval exercise. He also served as training controller for a joint Japan-Russia search-and-rescue exercise in September 2011, receiving vessels of the Russian Navy's Pacific Fleet at Wakasa Bay.

Kasui was serving as Commander of the 1st Escort Flotilla, based at Yokosuka, at the time of the 2011 Tōhoku earthquake and tsunami. According to a contemporary account, he was off-duty at the time the earthquake struck and made his way back to headquarters through severe traffic congestion before immediately organising a disaster-relief response. He subsequently coordinated with the US Navy aircraft carrier USS Ronald Reagan, then supporting the American Operation Tomodachi relief effort, directing his forces to areas requiring joint support and personally leading elements of the flotilla into the disaster zone, including the use of utility landing craft to reach coastal areas blocked by debris.

On 26 July 2012, he became Chief of Staff of the Ominato District.

On 22 August 2013, he became Chief of Staff of the Escort Fleet Command.

On 5 August 2014, he became Director-General of the Personnel and Education Department, Maritime Staff Office.

On 22 December 2016, he was promoted to admiral (kaisho) and appointed Commander of the 38th Escort Fleet.

On 1 April 2019, he was appointed the 50th Commander of the Self-Defense Fleet. On 15 October of the same year, he received a courtesy call from a multinational delegation of foreign naval officers, including Vice Admiral Suraj Berry of the Indian Navy's Eastern Naval Command, a Republic of Singapore Navy officer, and a Royal Navy officer, in connection with the 2019 International Fleet Review, which had been cancelled due to Typhoon Hagibis. The visiting delegation thanked the JMSDF for its support, and the meeting was described by the JMSDF as an opportunity to build friendship with the participating countries despite the review's cancellation.

He retired from the JMSDF on 25 August 2020. On 1 December of the same year, he was appointed an advisor to Mitsubishi Heavy Industries.

On 2 July 2021, he was awarded the Legion of Merit by the United States government.

== Awards ==
3rd Defensive Memorial Cordon

7th Defensive Memorial Cordon

10th Defensive Memorial Cordon

11th Defensive Memorial Cordon

15th Defensive Memorial Cordon

18th Defensive Memorial Cordon

19th Defensive Memorial Cordon

20th Defensive Memorial Cordon

21st Defensive Memorial Cordon

22nd Defensive Memorial Cordon

28th Defensive Memorial Cordon

32nd Defensive Memorial Cordon

33rd Defensive Memorial Cordon

37th Defensive Memorial Cordon

41st Defensive Memorial Cordon

Legion of Merit

== See also ==
- Japanese military ranks
- Self Defense Fleet
