= Yasuhiro Shigeoka =

Japanese admiral (born 1958)

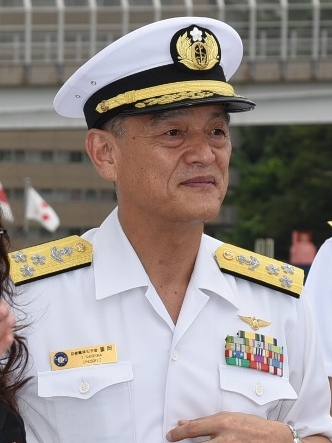
- Born: 13 November 1958 (age 67); Iwakuni, Yamaguchi
- Military career
- Allegiance: Japan
- Branch: Japan Maritime Self-Defense Force
- Service years: 1981–2016
- Rank: Admiral
- Commands: Commander of the Self Defense Fleet; Commander of the Fleet Air Force; Commander of the 2nd Air Group; Commander of the 6th Air Group
- Awards: See Awards

Admiral Yasuhiro Shigeoka (重岡康弘, Shigeoka Yasuhiro; born 13 November 1958) is a retired Japanese naval officer who served as Commander of the Self Defense Fleet of the Japan Maritime Self-Defense Force (JMSDF) from 2015 to 2016. He was the 48th Commander of the Self-Defense Fleet, succeeding Eiichi Funada, and was himself succeeded in 2016 by Kazuki Yamashita.

== Career ==
Shigeoka was born in Iwakuni, Yamaguchi Prefecture. In March 1981, he graduated from the 25th class of the National Defense Academy, where he studied civil engineering, and joined the Maritime Self-Defense Force. His branch specialisation was as a tactical air officer.

In July 1995, he was promoted to lieutenant commander (2nd class kaisa).

In January 2000, he was promoted to commander (1st class kaisa).

On 20 September 2001, he became Chief of the Business Planning Group in the Defense Division, Defense Department, Maritime Staff Office.

On 20 August 2003, he became Commander of the 6th Air Group.

On 28 July 2005, he became Chief of the Personnel Planning Division, Personnel and Education Department, Maritime Staff Office.

On 4 August 2006, he was promoted to rear admiral (kaisho-ho) and became Commander of the 2nd Air Group.

On 1 August 2008, he became Director-General of the General Affairs Department, Maritime Staff Office.

On 7 December 2009, he became Inspector General of the Defense Inspection Headquarters.

On 5 August 2011, he became Chief of Staff of the Sasebo District.

On 4 December 2012, he was promoted to admiral (kaisho) and became Commander of the Fleet Air Force.

On 28 March 2014, he became Vice Chief of Staff of the Maritime Staff Office.

On 4 August 2015, he was appointed the 48th Commander of the Self-Defense Fleet.

On 22 December 2016, he retired from the JMSDF. After retiring, he became an advisor to Gibraltar Life Insurance Co., Ltd.

== Awards ==
2nd Defensive Memorial Cordon

3rd Defensive Memorial Cordon

10th Defensive Memorial Cordon

11th Defensive Memorial Cordon

18th Defensive Memorial Cordon

19th Defensive Memorial Cordon

20th Defensive Memorial Cordon

21st Defensive Memorial Cordon

26th Defensive Memorial Cordon

27th Defensive Memorial Cordon

31st Defensive Memorial Cordon

32nd Defensive Memorial Cordon

33rd Defensive Memorial Cordon

40th Defensive Memorial Cordon

== See also ==
- Japanese military ranks
- Self Defense Fleet
