= Fleet Research and Development Command =

Research arm of the Japanese navy

- 開発隊群
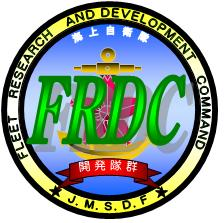
- Fleet Research and Development Command emblem
- Active: 1 July 1978 – present
- Country: Japan
- Allegiance: Japan
- Branch: Japan Maritime Self-Defense Force
- Role: Research
- Part of: Self Defense Fleet
- Garrison/HQ: Yokosuka
- Anniversaries: 1 July
- Website: https://www.mod.go.jp/msdf/frdc/

Commanders
- Commander: Major general Yamaoka Tetsuji

The Fleet Research and Development Command belonged to the surface force for the self-defense fleet of the Maritime Self-Defense Forces. Its main tasks are experimental technology testing and development.

== History ==
On 16 October 1973, the Self-Defense Fleet was subordinated to the new edition of the Program Operations Force. On 1 July 1978, the Self-Defense Fleet was placed under the new edition of Development Guidance Group. The integration of the experimental team and the marine training guidance team, the equipment experimental team, and the application development team were newly reorganized. Compilation of the new edition (Headquarters, Equipment Experimental Team, Operational Development Team, 1st, 2nd, 3rd, 4th and 11th Marine Training Guidance Team, Kagoshima Test Center, JDS Yukikaze)

On 8 April 1980, JDS Kurihama was incorporated into the service. On 31 October 1981, The Atsugi Operations Detachment was newly added to the Program Operations Force. On 22 March 1995, the JDS Asuka was commissioned into the fleet. On 22 March 2002, Development Guidance Group was abolished. The Fleet Research and Development Corps was newly formed under the Self-Defense Fleet. Program Operations Force (including Atsugi program work division), equipment experiment corps, operation development corps were abolished. Command and Communication Development Corps, Ship Development Corps, and Aviation Program Development Corps are newly formed and transferred to the Development Corps. The Kagoshima Laboratory, the Kurihama, and the Asuka were transferred to the development group. On 6 April 2012, the Kurihama was decommissioned.

On 1 December 2015, the Kagoshima Laboratory was reorganized from the Kagoshima Sound Measurement Institute, and the Oceanography ASW Support Command was reorganized as a substitute. On 1 April 2020, the test ship Asuka was placed directly under the jurisdiction of the development team under the affiliation.

The FRDC was renamed as the Maritime warfare Research and Development Command on April 1, 2023 as part of reorganizing the command.

== Gallery ==
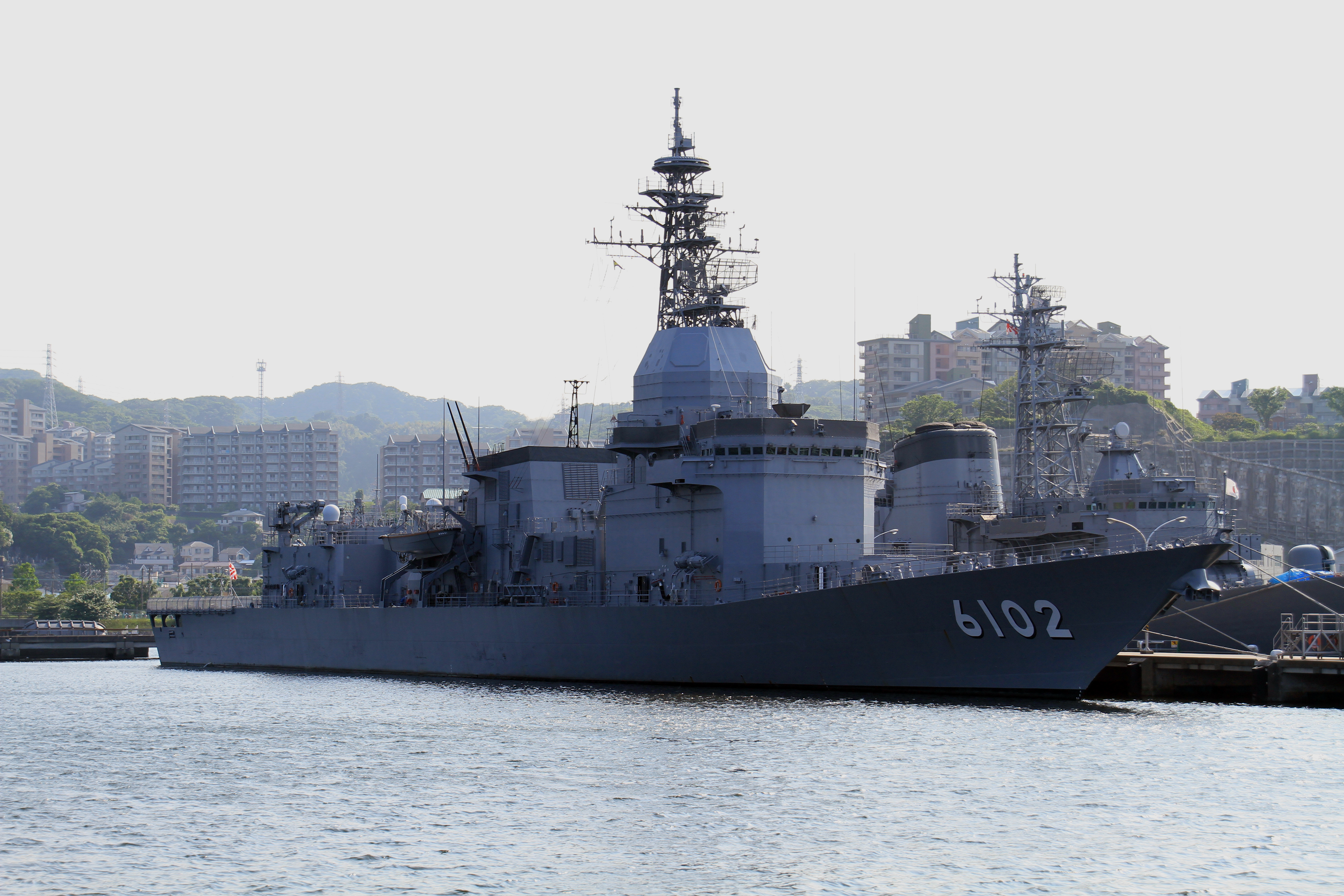
JS Asuka

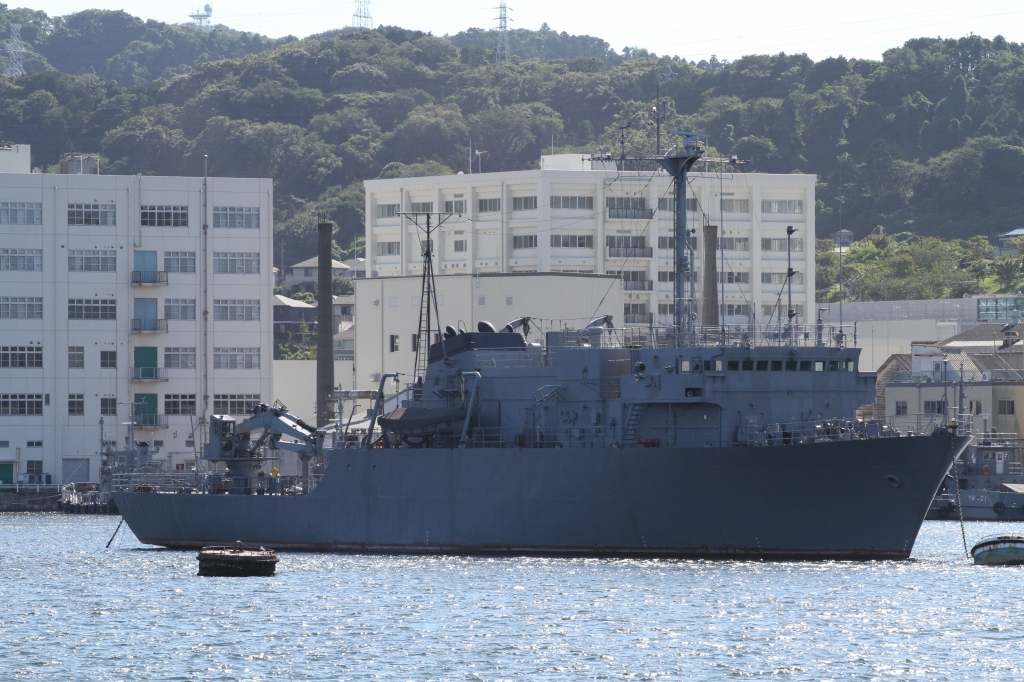
JS Kurihama
