= Fleet Intelligence Command =

Intelligence arm of the Japanese navy

- 艦隊情報群
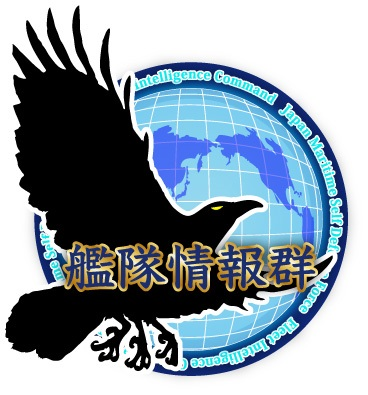
- Fleet Intelligence Command emblem
- Active: 20 January 1997 – 26 March 2026
- Country: Japan
- Allegiance: Japan
- Branch: Japan Maritime Self-Defense Force
- Type: Naval intelligence and security unit
- Size: Command
- Part of: Self-Defense Fleet
- Garrison/HQ: Yokosuka
- Anniversaries: 20 January
- Website: https://web.archive.org/web/20230223120038/https://www.mod.go.jp/msdf/sf/unit/W007H0000007.html

Commanders
- Commander: Captain Yosuke Inaba

The Fleet Intelligence Command (Japanese: 艦隊情報群, Hepburn: Kantai Jōhō-Gun) was the naval intelligence and security arm of the Japan Maritime Self-Defense Force (JMSDF) tasked with advancing countering naval hybrid threats, naval counterintelligence, naval intelligence gathering, and strategic intelligence through collecting and analyzing naval forces intelligence from around the world. It was previously known as Intelligence Operations Command (情報業務群, Jōhōgyōmugun).

The FIC's last commander was Captain Yosuke Inaba.

== History ==
It was the only naval intelligence and security unit of the Japan Maritime Self-Defense Force with the establishment of the Defense Intelligence Headquarters on 20 January 1997.

On 19 March 2020, Takashi Inoue, then FIC commander, was reported to have debriefed a former vice admiral on Japanese national security circumstances. He was subsequently indicted for violating the State Secrecy Law in December 2022.

On 1 October 2020, the Information Business Group was abolished and the Fleet Intelligence Command was established in its place. The Operation Information Support Corps, Electronic Information Support Corps, and Basic Information Support Corps were abolished, and the Operation Information Corps and Electromagnetic Information Corps were newly added. The FIC's capacity has been increased from about 200 to about 230, the efficiency of operations has been improved by integrating the units, the ability to collect and analyze electromagnetic wave information, etc. has been improved, and the information support function for the Self-Defense Fleet has been added.

On 25 and 26 August 2022, FIC conducted a tabletop exercise with the U.S. Navy Task Force 70 (TF70) / Carrier Strike Group 5 at the Maritime Operations Center in Funakoshi.

On 9 September 2024, the JMSDF announced that the Fleet Information Warfare command will be formed, which will integrate the FIC alongside the Oceanography ASW Support Command and the Communications Command.

By 23 March 2026, the FIC was stood down and replaced by the Information Warfare Command.

== Duties ==
The main task is to analyze and distribute operational information necessary for units such as the Self Defense Fleet and the Regional District Forces that operate ships and aircraft, clandestine and covert operations, countering naval hybrid threats, counter naval intelligence, information and psychological warfare, naval cybersecurity, naval intelligence gathering and assessment, signals intelligence (SIGINT), strategic intelligence (STRATINT), and threat assessment to Japan Maritime Self-Defense Force.

== Organization ==
The headquarters is located in the Maritime Operations Center in Funakoshi district.

=== Fleet Intelligence Command (Funakoshi) ===
- Intelligence Management Office

=== Operational Intelligence Center (Funakoshi) ===
- General Affairs Department
- Strategic Intelligence Department 1
- Strategic Intelligence Department 2
- Strategic Intelligence Department 3
- Computer Science

=== Electromagnetic Intelligence Command (Funakoshi) ===
- General Affairs Department
- Computer Science
- Electromagnetic Intelligence Department 1
- Electromagnetic Intelligence Department 2
- Research Guidance Department

== Equipment ==
The FIC is known to operate SURTASS-equipped ships, consisting of the Hibiki and the Harima.
