= Fleet Submarine Force =

Submarinefleet of the Japanese navy

- 潜水艦隊
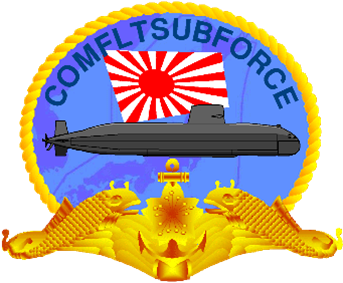
- Fleet Submarine Force emblem
- Active: 10 February 1981 – present
- Country: Japan
- Allegiance: Japan
- Branch: Japan Maritime Self-Defense Force
- Role: Fleet
- Size: approx 1,800 people
- Part of: Self-Defense Fleet
- Garrison/HQ: Yokosuka
- Anniversaries: 10 February
- Website: https://www.mod.go.jp/msdf/sbf/index.html

The Fleet Submarine Force belonged to the surface force for the self-defense fleet of the Maritime Self-Defense Forces. It is a fleet organized around submarines belonging to the Self-Defense Fleet of the Japan Maritime Self-Defense Force.

== History ==
On 1 February 1965, the 1st Submarine Group was newly formed under the Self-Defense Fleet. On 16 October 1973, the 2nd Submarine Group was newly formed under the Self-Defense Fleet. On 10 February 1981, the Submarine Fleet was newly formed under the Self-Defense Fleet (Headquarters, 1st Submarine Group, 2nd Submarine Group, Submarine Education and Training Corps).

On 9 March 2000, a new edition of the 1st Training Submarine. Initially, the submarines belonged in the group were JDS Asashio and JDS Setoshio. On 22 March 2002, the Yokosuka Submarine Education and Training Detachment was newly established in the Submarine Education and Training Corps. On 1 October 2020, the Submarine Fleet Command moved to the new Maritime Operations Center, a new government building of the Self-Defense Fleet Command completed in the Funakoshi area.

== Gallery ==
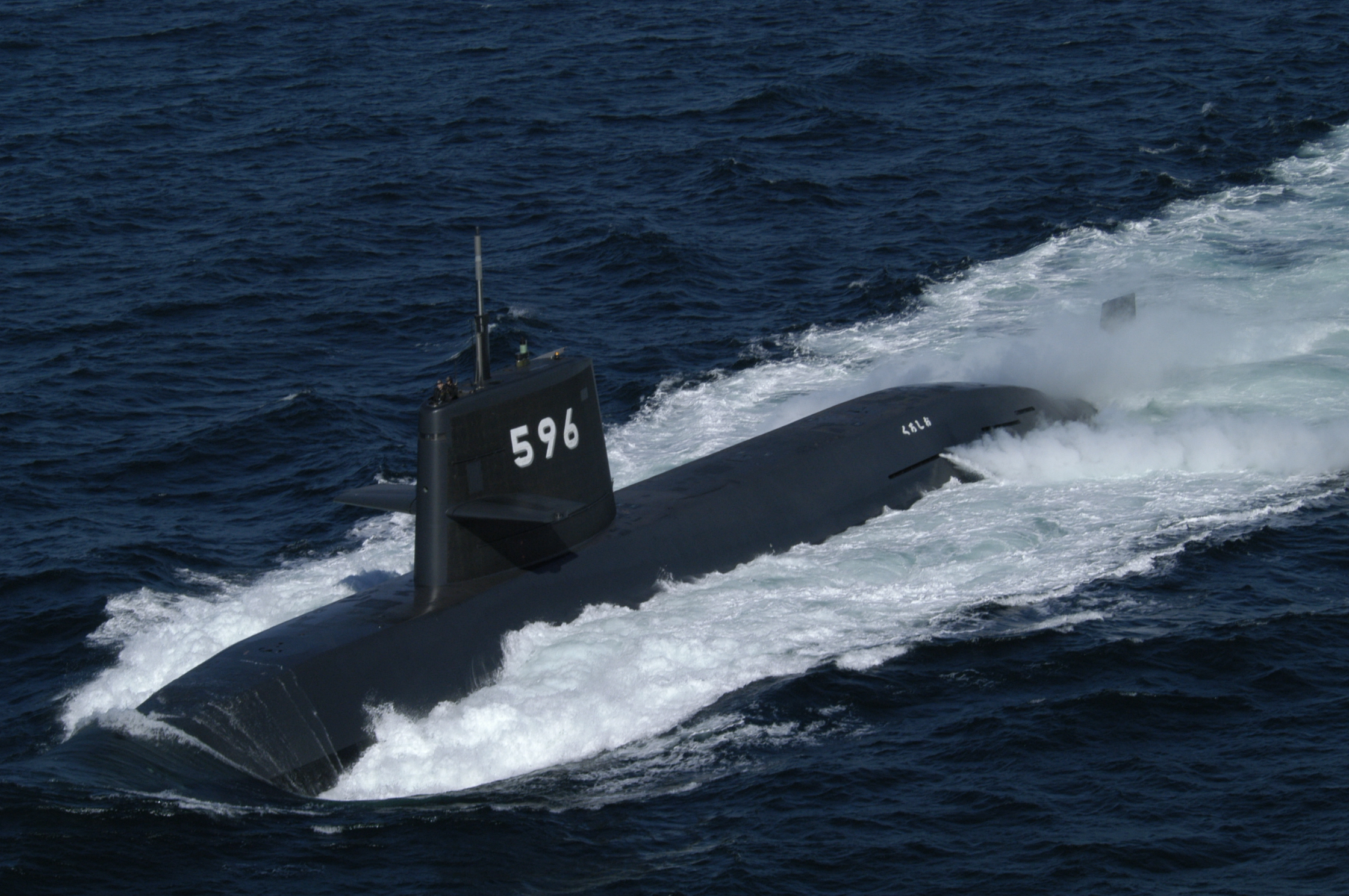
JS Kuroshio

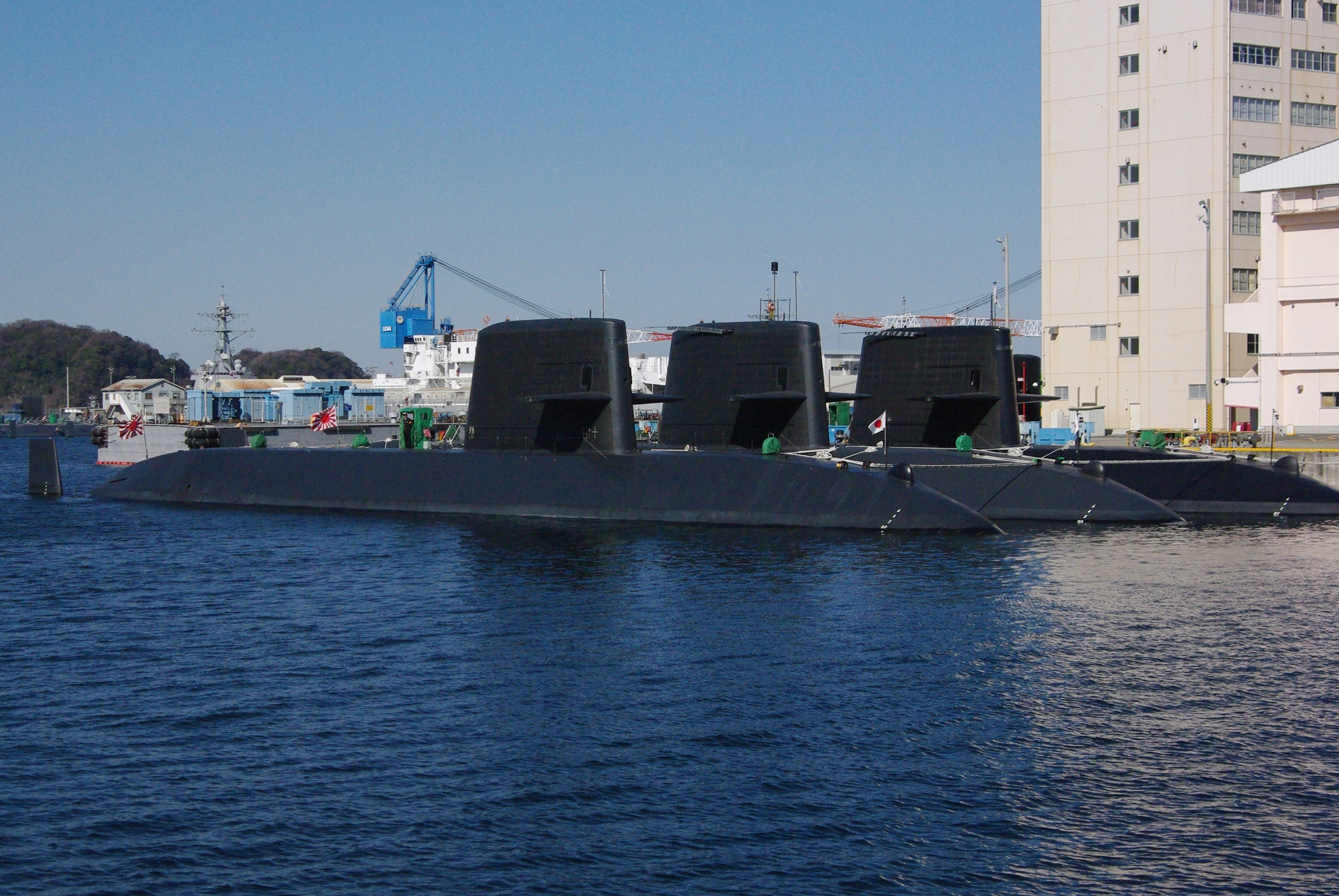
Oyashio-class submarine

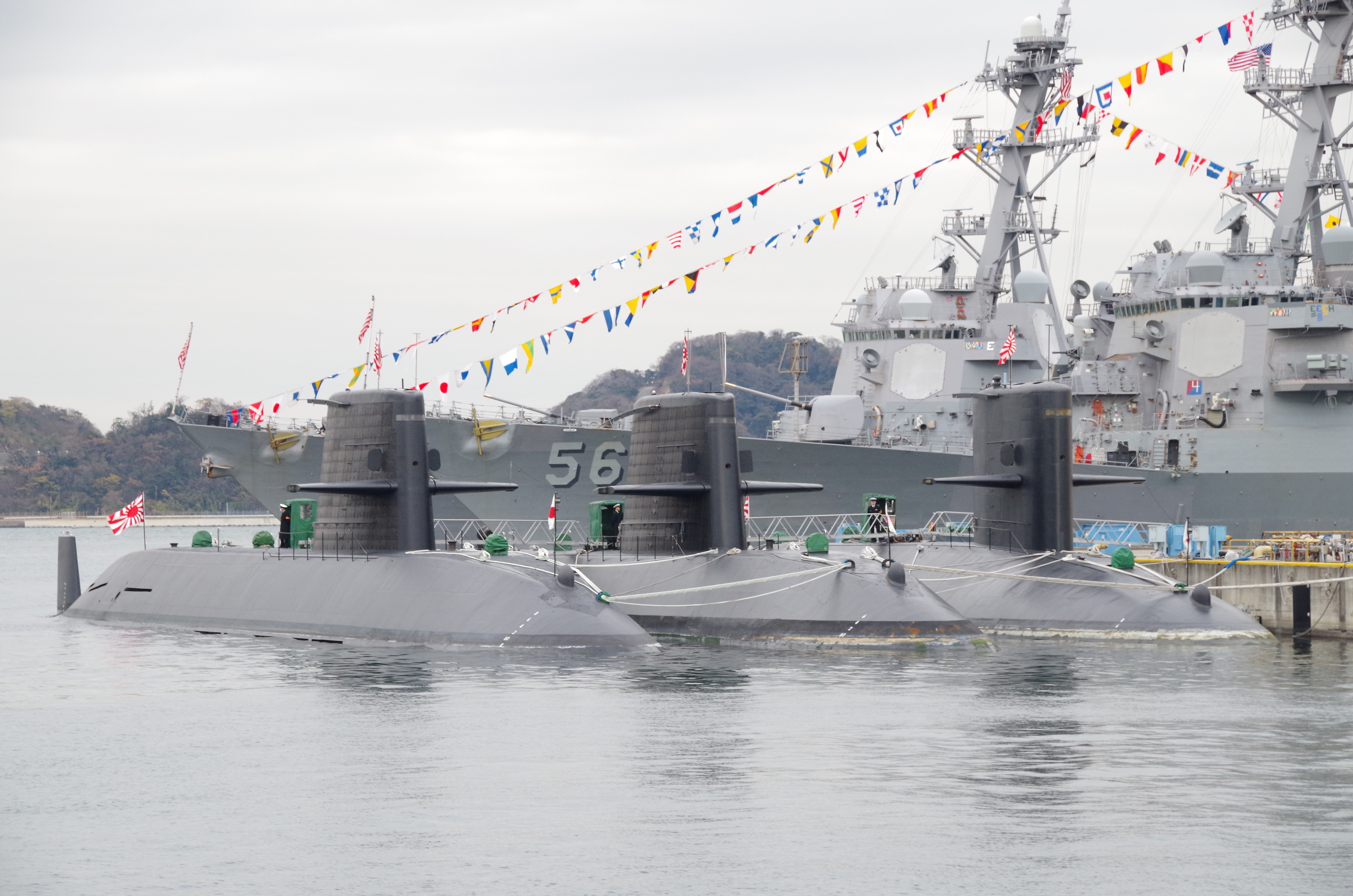
