= Self Defense Fleet =

Self Defense Fleet of the JMSDF

- 自衛艦隊
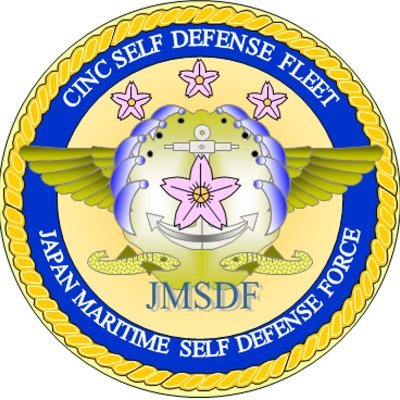
- Self Defense Fleet emblem
- Active: 1 July 1954 – present
- Country: Japan
- Allegiance: Japan
- Branch: Japan Maritime Self-Defense Force
- Role: Fleet
- Size: approx 24,000 people
- Part of: Japan Maritime Self-Defense Force
- Garrison/HQ: Yokosuka
- Anniversaries: 1 July
- Website: https://www.mod.go.jp/msdf/sf/index.html

Commanders
- Commander: Vice Admiral Omachi Katsushi

The Self Defense Fleet (Japanese: 自衛艦隊, Hepburn: Jiei Kantai) is the main force of the Maritime Self-Defense Force, and was established at the same time as the establishment of the Self-Defense Forces (predecessor of the Ministry of Defense) on July 1, 1954. It operates ships and aircraft, and responds to maritime defense in the waters around Japan, various situations, and international missions.

== Overview ==
The Self-Defense Fleet is composed of the headquarters and Fleet Escort Force, Fleet Air Force, Fleet Submarine Force, Mine Warfare Force, Fleet Intelligence Command, Oceanography ASW Support Command, Fleet Research and Development Command, and other units specified by the Minister of Defense. It can be said that it is a de facto control unit of the actual combat division, which is equivalent to the Combined Fleet of the Imperial Japanese Navy.

The headquarters is located in the Funakoshi district (7-73 Funakoshi-cho, Yokosuka City, Kanagawa Prefecture). The new government building Marine Operations Center completed on the site of the Kanto Auto Works began full-scale operation on October 1, 2020. In addition to the Self-Defense Fleet Command, the center contains the headquarters of the Fleet Escort Force, Fleet Air Force, Fleet Submarine Force, Mine Warfare Force, Fleet Intelligence Command, Oceanography ASW Support Command, Fleet Research and Development Command. The Maritime Operations Center before the completion of the new government building pointed to the command facility within the Self-Defense Fleet Command.

Commanded by the commander of the Self Defense Fleet, under the command and supervision of the Minister of Defense through the Chief of Staff, Joint Staff, the commander of the Fleet Escort Force, the commander of the Fleet Air Force, and the commander of the Fleet Submarine Force operate the unit provided by such as a person in charge of dealing with certain situation. The commander of the Self-Defense Fleet is assigned by the Maritime Self-Defense Force. In principle, the executor of the Self-Defense Forces Fleet Review is the Commander of the Self-Defense Forces Fleet.

According to the Self-Defense Forces Bill Guidelines decided by the Cabinet on March 2, 1954, after an agreement was reached by the Conservative Three-Party Defense Negotiations of the Liberal Party, the Kaishintō Party, and the Japanese Liberal Party, a coalition self-defense fleet would be formed within the Maritime Self-Defense Force. However, in the Self-Defense Forces Bill officially decided by the Cabinet on March 9, 1954, it was changed to simply call it the Self-Defense Forces Fleet.
