= Tenryu =

Tenryū may refer to:

- Tenryū, Shizuoka, a city
- Tenryū, Nagano, a village
- Tenryū River
- Tenryū-ji, a temple
- Japanese ship Tenryū, several ships

== People with the name ==
- Tenryū Saburō (Saburo Wakuta, 1903-1989), Japanese sumo wrestler and martial arts fighter
- Genichiro Tenryu (Genichiro Shimada, born 1950), Japanese sumo wrestler and wrestler promoter
