= JDS Azuma =

Training ship Azuma

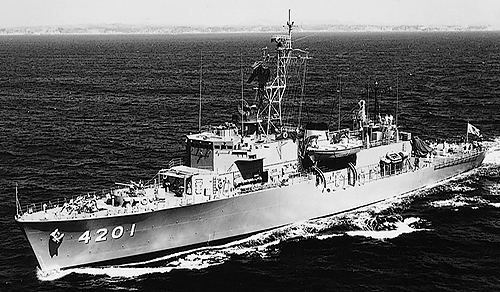
- JS Azuma

History

Japan
- Name: Azuma; (あづま)
- Namesake: Azuma
- Ordered: 1967
- Builder: Maizuru Heavy Industries, Maizuru
- Laid down: 13 July 1968
- Launched: 14 April 1969
- Commissioned: 26 November 1969
- Decommissioned: 28 May 1999
- Home port: Kure
- Identification: Pennant number: ATS-4201

Class overview
- Preceded by: N/A
- Succeeded by: Kurobe class

General characteristics
- Class & type: Training ship
- Displacement: 1,950–2,400 tonnes (1,919–2,362 long tons; 2,150–2,646 short tons) full load
- Length: 98 m (321 ft 6 in)
- Beam: 13 m (42 ft 8 in)
- Draft: 3.8 m (12 ft 6 in)
- Depth: 7.2 m (23 ft 7 in)
- Propulsion: 2 × Kawasaki-MAN V8 V22 / 30ATL diesel engines
- Speed: 18 knots (33 km/h; 21 mph)
- Boats & landing craft carried: 2 x lifeboats
- Complement: 185
- Sensors & processing systems: AN/SPS-40 air-search radar; OPS-16 surface-search radar; AN/SQS-11A sonar; Mark 51 fire control system
- Armament: 1 × 3-inch/50-caliber gun; 2 × triple torpedo launchers
- Aircraft carried: 10 × KD-2R-5 Kai low-speed target system; 3 × BQM-34AJ high-speed target system
- Aviation facilities: Hangar and helipad

JDS Azuma (ATS-4201) was a training support ship of Japan Maritime Self-Defense Force. JS Kurobe was built in 1989 for the purpose of training that could not properly supported by Azuma's equipment, and so she was removed from the register in 1999 when the new training ship Tenryu was built.

== Development and design ==
In 1957, during the Second Defense Build-up Plan, the Maritime Self-Defense Force received 10 KD-2R-3 low-speed target aircraft from the US Navy and began operating unmanned target aircraft (target drones). In the same year, the Landing Ship Support (LSSL) Hamagiku was incorporated into the Yokosuka District Force and remodeled into an unmanned target aircraft mother boat. After that, the KD-2R-5 was also introduced, but the rear deck of the boat was narrow, which hindered the launch work of the target aircraft, so in 1964, the Kusu-class patrol ship, JDS Kusu was newly introduced. It was selected and refurbished as an unmanned target aircraft mother ship.

However, at that time, with the aggravation of the airborne threat, the deployment of new-generation anti-aircraft weapon systems such as 5-inch single-armed quick-firing guns and tartar systems were progressing, and the KD-2R low-speed target aircraft provided a sufficient training environment. Problems that could not be provided were being pointed out. For this reason, it was planned to introduce the BQM-34 Firebee, a high-speed jet-propelled target aircraft operated by the US military in the three armies at that time. At that time, the US military operated by ground launch or air launch, but the Maritime Self-Defense Force could not operate in this way due to the setting of the training sea area and the lack of launch aircraft. For this reason, this ship was built as the world's first platform for operating a Firebee high-speed target aircraft on board.

== Construction and career ==
Azuma was laid down on 13 July 1968 at Maizuru Heavy Industries, Maizuru and launched on 14 April 1969. The ship was commissioned on 26 November 1969.

Reorganized into a ship under the direct control of the escort fleet on 24 June 1994.

Removed from the register on 28 May 1999. During the commissioning period of about 30 years, she engaged in a total of 1317 training support missions, including a total range of about 624,000 nautical miles (about 29 laps of the earth), 504 firebees, 344 chakas, and 469 low-speed drones.
