= Japanese ship Azuma =

At least three naval vessels of Japan have been named Azuma (sometimes transliterated (archaically) as Adzuma):

- Japanese ironclad Azuma, an ironclad warship of the Imperial Japanese Navy
- Japanese cruiser Azuma, an armored cruiser of the Imperial Japanese Navy
- JDS Azuma, a training ship launched in 1969
