= JMSDF Sasebo Naval Base =

Naval base in Nagasaki Prefecture, Japan

Sasebo Naval Base
- 佐世保地方隊
- Part of Sasebo District Force
- Sasebo, Kyushu in Japan

Site information
- Type: Naval base
- Owner: Japanese Maritime Self-Defense Force
- Operator: Japan Maritime Self-Defense Force
- Website: www.mod.go.jp/msdf/sasebo/

Location
- Coordinates: 33°09′43″N 129°42′44″E

Site history
- Built: 14 November 1953
- In use: 1953

Garrison information
- Occupants: Self Defense Fleet; Communications Command; Kure District Force; Training Squadron; Mine Warfare Force; Fleet Submarine Force; Oceanographic and ASW Support Command

The Sasebo Naval Base (Japanese: 佐世保基地, Hepburn: Sasebo Kichi), also simply known as the JMSDF Sasebo Naval Base, is a group of ports and land facilities of the Japan Maritime Self-Defense Force (JMSDF), which are scattered in multiple districts of Sasebo City, Kyushu, and where the Sasebo District Force are located.

== Background ==
On September 16, 1953, it was newly reorganized by the National Safety Agency's Coastal Safety Force with the mission of protecting the West Sea. When the Sasebo District Force was reorganized, the Coastal Security Force had nominated Sasebo from the beginning, but after the Pacific War, Sasebo City planned to transform into a peaceful industrial city under the Former Military Port City Conversion Law. Therefore, it was not always active in attracting guards. Imari City had been actively campaigning to attract guard bases there. Hoping to attract the force suddenly increased in Sasebo City, and they decided to provide the site of the former Navy Defense Force (Hizukushimachi), which had started to be developed as a fishery base. Eventually, Tokutaro Kimura, Commissioner of the Japan Coast Guard, visited Sasebo and Imari, and decided to set up a guard base in Sasebo.

The security area is west of Yamaguchi Prefecture on the Tsushima Strait and the Sea of Japan side, and west of Kagoshima Prefecture on the Pacific side. Fukuoka Prefecture, Saga Prefecture, Nagasaki Prefecture, Kumamoto Prefecture, Kagoshima Prefecture and Okinawa Prefecture, and the boundary between Shimane and Yamaguchi prefectures are drawn at 315 degrees from the intersection with the coastline. From the point where the border between Ube and Yamaguchi intersects with the coastline, the line where the border between Fukuoka and Oita intersects with the coastline, and the border between Miyazaki and Kagoshima intersects with the coastline. The coastal waters of these prefectures between the 170 degree line.

The main duties are security and defense in the security area in charge, disaster dispatch, logistical support for front units such as the Self Defense Fleet, removal and disposal of naval mines and explosive dangerous goods, and civil-military cooperation.

The force of the ships belonging to the Sasebo District Force consists of the 43rd Mine Warfare Force, deployed in the 3rd Missile Boat Corps and the Shimonoseki Base Corps, and the 46th Mine Warfare Force, deployed in the Okinawa Base Corps. As a force user (responsible for dealing with situations), they operate escort vessels and rotorcraft and provide the escort fleet and aviation groups to deal with situations.

In recent years, Hayabusa-class patrol boats have been deployed in sequence to prepare for craft ships to North Korea. In addition, on March 26, 2019, the Aiura Garrison Sakibe Branch was established in the Sakibe area, where the Ground Self-Defense Force Amphibious Rapid Deployment Brigade Combat Landing Battalion is stationed.

== History ==
On 1 August 1952, the National Safety Agency Coastal Safety Force was established, and the Sasebo Route Enlightenment Corps was newly formed under the control of the Yokosuka District Force. On November 25 Sasebo City Council approves provision to the guards of the former garrison site in the Kurashima area.

On 28 August 1953, a general supervision department was set up for the southwestern part of the Guard in Sasebo. On September 16, the new edition of the Sasebo District Force of the Guard was created, established by the District General Administration Department and the Sasebo Base Guard. On November 14, the opening of the District General Administration Department at the site of the former garrison in the Kurashima area.

On 1 July 1954, the National Safety Agency Guard was reorganized into the Defense Agency Maritime Self-Defense Force. In March 1968, Sasebo District General Manager relocated to the current location.

On 3 November 1971, the Maritime Self-Defense Force observing ceremony was held in Sasebo. 45 ships and 61 aircraft participated.

On 15 October 1980, Self-Defense Force Sasebo Hospital was opened.

On March 31, 1986, marked the completion of the first pier for 5,000-ton class destroyers in the Hirase area.

In May 1989, the second pier in the Hirase area was completed.

In March 2019 the Ground Self-Defense Force Sakibe branch office opened in Sakibe district.

At the end of March 2021, the Self-Defense Forces Yokosuka Hospital abolished the Self-Defense Forces Sasebo Hospital due to the strengthening of its functions, and plans to reduce it to a clinic.

== Facilities and operational units ==
=== Hirase District ===
- Sasebo District Force
- Self-Defense Force Sasebo Hospital
- Sasebo Communications Command
- Sasebo District Police
- Sasebo Music Corps
- Fleet Escort Force
  - 2nd Escort Flotilla
  - 1st Escort Flotilla
  - 4th Escort Flotilla
  - 13th Escort Flotilla

=== Sakibe District ===
- Sasebo Education Corps
- Sasebo Guard
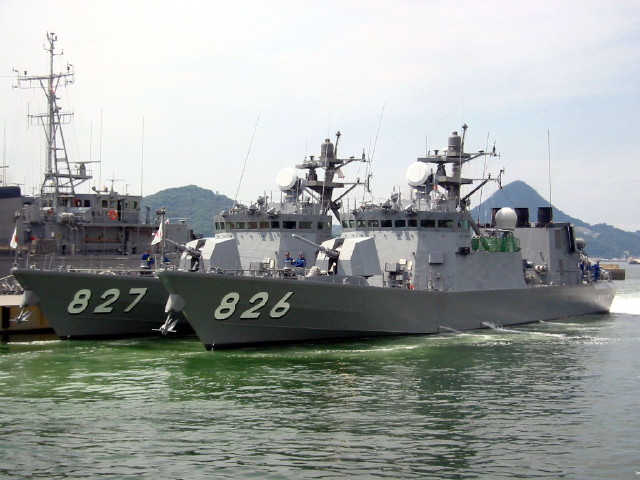
  - 3rd Missile Boat Flotilla at Sakibe Pier
    3rd Missile Boat Flotilla
- Sasebo Ammunition Maintenance Supply Station
- Ground Self-Defense Force Sakibe Branch

=== Tategami District ===
- Sasebo Repair Supply Station
- Sasebo Magnetic Measurement Station

=== Hidzukushi District ===
- Sasebo Base Business Corps
- Mine Warfare Force
  - 2nd Mine Warfare Force
- Sasebo Maritime Training Guidance Team
- Sasebo Sanitation Corps
- MDSF Sasebo History Museum
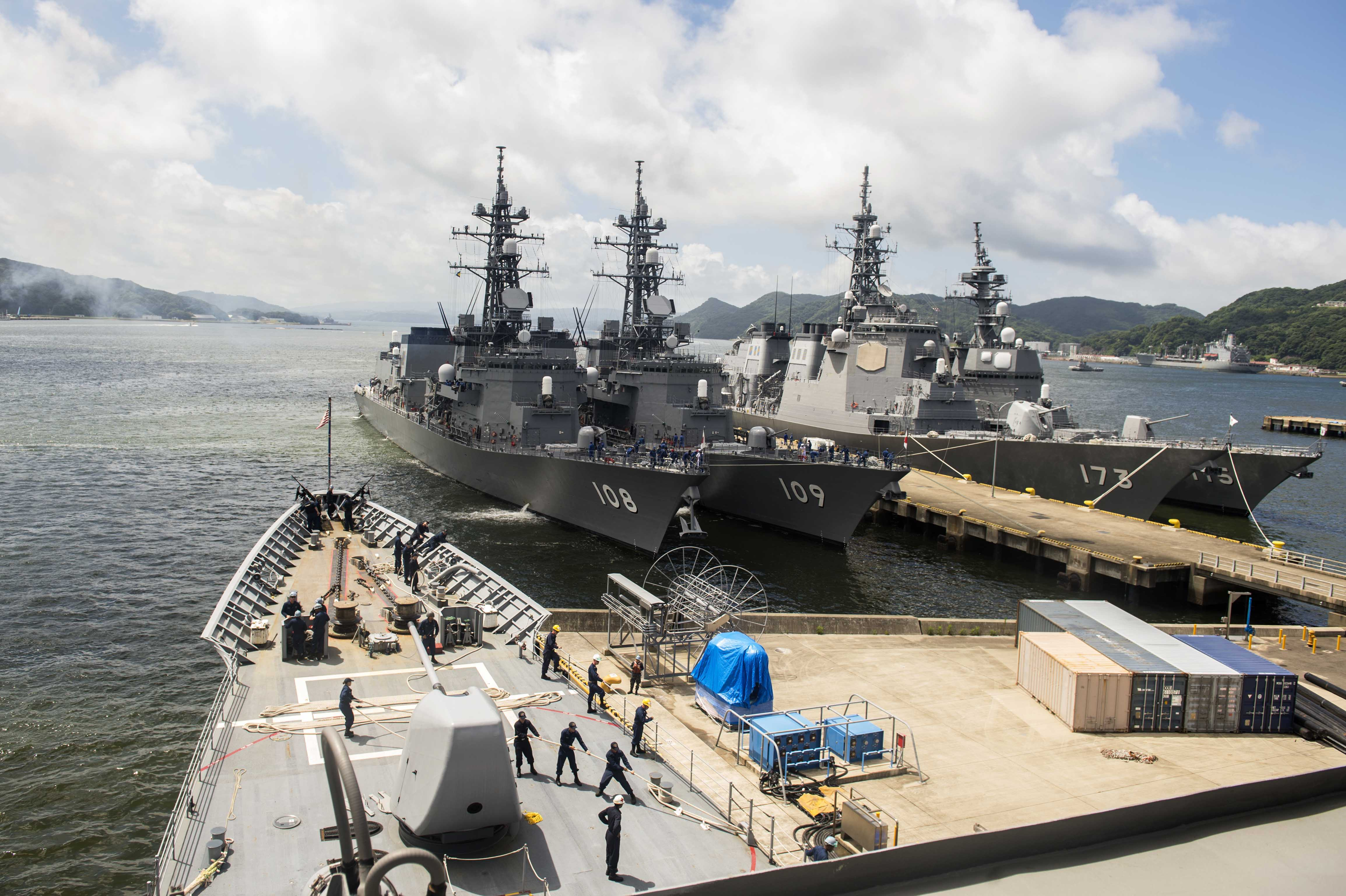
JS Akebono, Ariake, Kongō and Akizuki at Tategami Pier

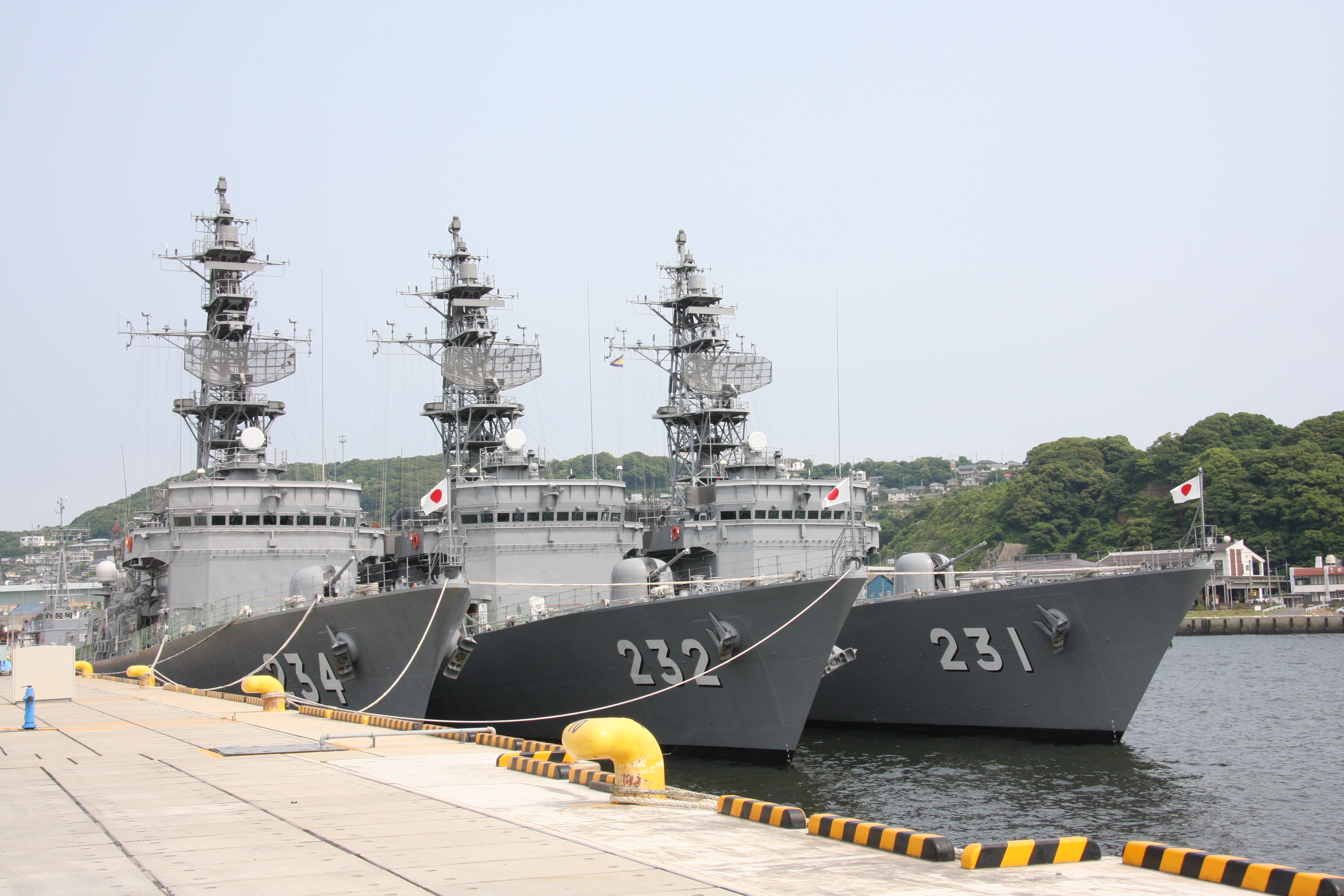
Abukuma-class destroyer escorts at Sasebo

== See also ==
- JMSDF Ōminato Naval Base
- JMSDF Yokosuka Naval Base
- JMSDF Maizuru Naval Base
- JMSDF Kure Naval Base
