= Japanese ship Tenryū =

Three Japanese warships have borne the name Tenryū:

- Japanese corvette Tenryū, a steam corvette of the Imperial Japanese Navy launched in 1883 and scrapped in 1912
- Japanese cruiser Tenryū, a Tenryū-class cruiser of the Imperial Japanese Navy launched in 1918 and sunk in 1942.
- JS Tenryū, a training support vessel of the Japan Maritime Self-Defense Force launched in 1999
