= JS Kurobe =

Training ship Kurobe

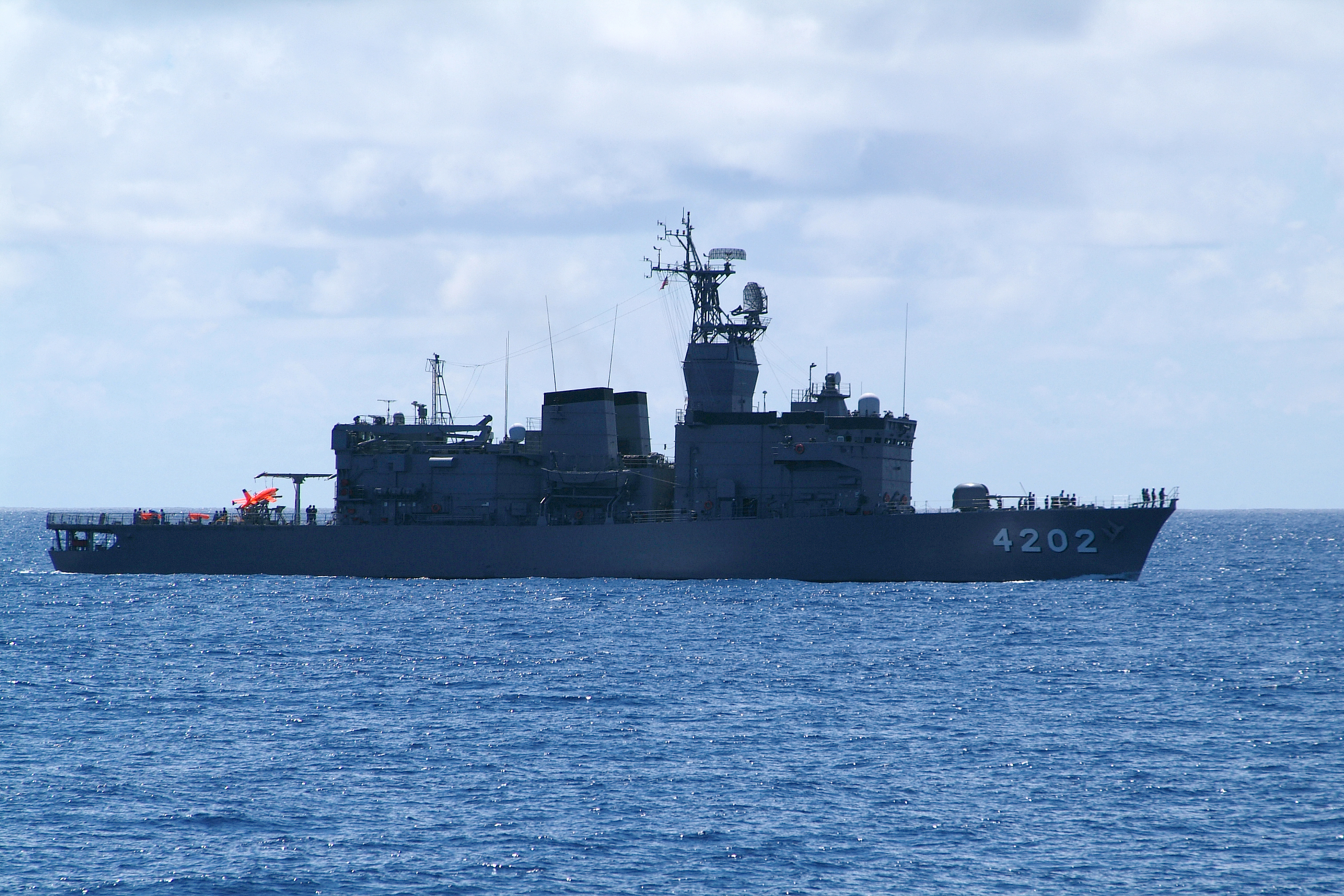
- JS Kurobe

History

Japan
- Name: Kurobe; (くろべ)
- Namesake: Kurobe
- Ordered: 1986
- Builder: JFE, Kure
- Laid down: 31 October 1987
- Launched: 23 May 1988
- Commissioned: 23 March 1989
- Home port: Kure
- Identification: MMSI number: 431999579; Callsign: JSQF; Pennant number: ATS-4202
- Status: Active

Class overview
- Preceded by: Azuma class
- Succeeded by: Tenryū class

General characteristics
- Class & type: Training ship
- Displacement: 2,200–2,550 long tons (2,235–2,591 t) full load
- Length: 100.5 m (329 ft 9 in)
- Beam: 16.5 m (54 ft 2 in)
- Draught: 8.5 m (27 ft 11 in)
- Depth: 3.97 m (13 ft 0 in)
- Propulsion: 4 × diesel engines
- Speed: 20 knots (37 km/h; 23 mph)
- Range: 5,500 nmi (10,200 km; 6,300 mi) at 20 kn (37 km/h; 23 mph)
- Complement: 143
- Electronic warfare & decoys: Target aircraft multiple control system; BQM-34AJ high-speed target system; Missile evaluation device
- Armament: 1 × OTO Melara 76 mm gun
- Aircraft carried: 4 x BQM-74E unmanned target aircraft Chaka III
- Aviation facilities: Hangar and helipad

JS Kurobe (ATS-4202) is a training support ship of Japan Maritime Self-Defense Force.

== Development and design ==
It is a ship for anti-aircraft shooting training support, and its main purpose is to launch and guide unmanned target aircraft. It was built as a complement to the air threat, higher performance of air defense weapons, and the obsolescence of the predecessor training ship JDS Azuma.

It is a flat deck type ship type, equipped with one 76-millimetre (3.0 in) single gun on the front deck. The target aircraft will be equipped with four BMQ-34AJ Firebee and four BQM-74E Chaka III, for a total of eight. These target aircraft are launched from the rear helipad, and up to three aircraft can be simultaneously guided and controlled by a four-sided phased array radar on the top of the ship's structure. A radar for evaluating shooting results is also installed separately.

== Construction and career ==
Kurobe was laid down on 31 October 1987 at JFE Holdings, Kure and launched on 23 May 1988. The ship was commissioned on 23 March 1989.

In September 1990, a female Self-Defense Forces officer (correspondent, Naoko Matsuo, 3rd Lieutenant) became the first ship of the Maritime Self-Defense Force to be on board. On 24 June 1994 Kurobe was reorganized into the escort fleet as a ship under direct control.

On 26 March 2008 the 1st Maritime Training Support Corps was newly formed under the escort fleet and was incorporated together with JS Tenryū. In response to the Great East Japan Earthquake off the Pacific coast of Tohoku Earthquake, the vessel departed for the disaster area, Onagawa Town, Miyagi Prefecture, to aid in disaster relief.

== Gallery ==
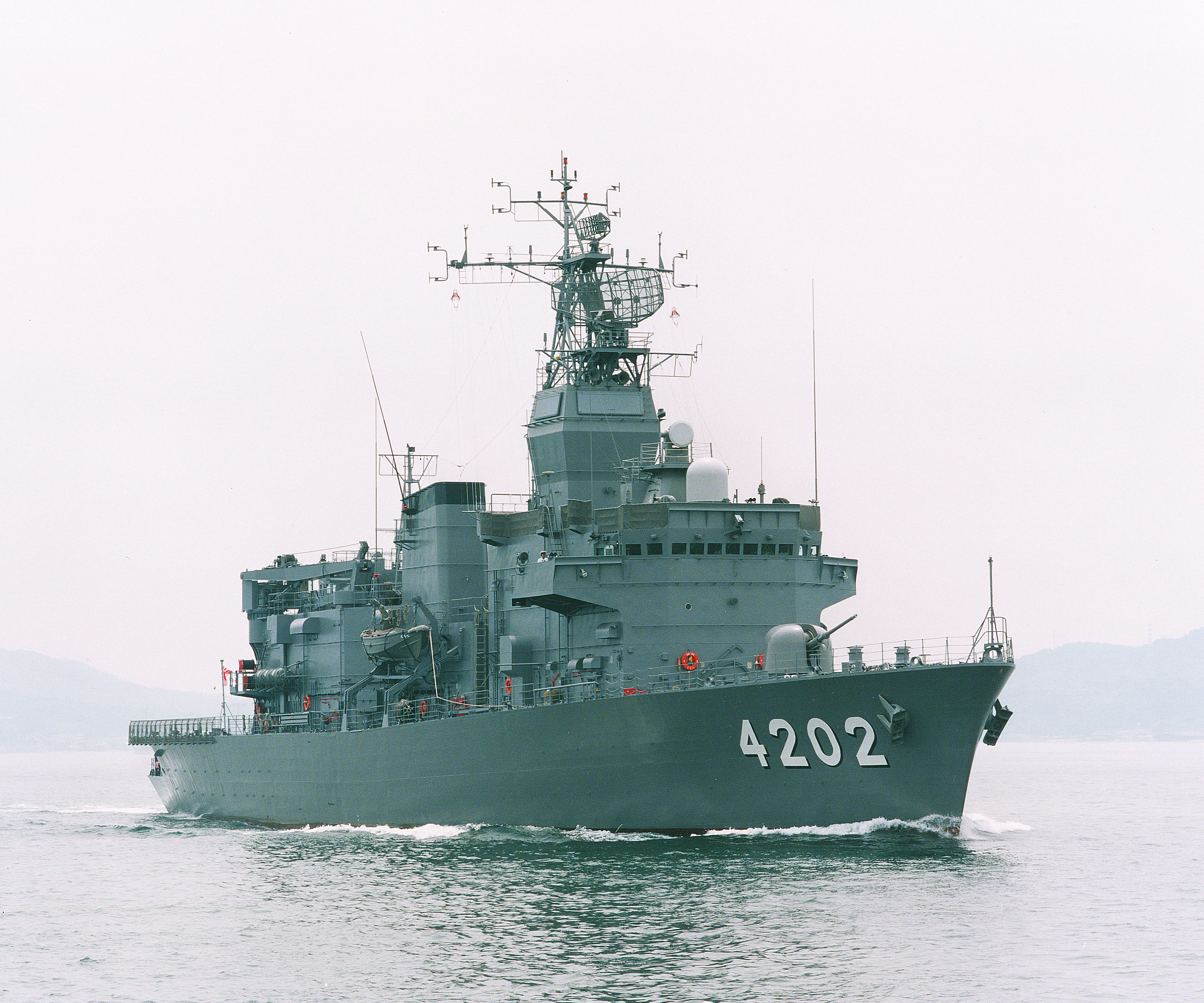
JS Kurobe underway, date unknown.

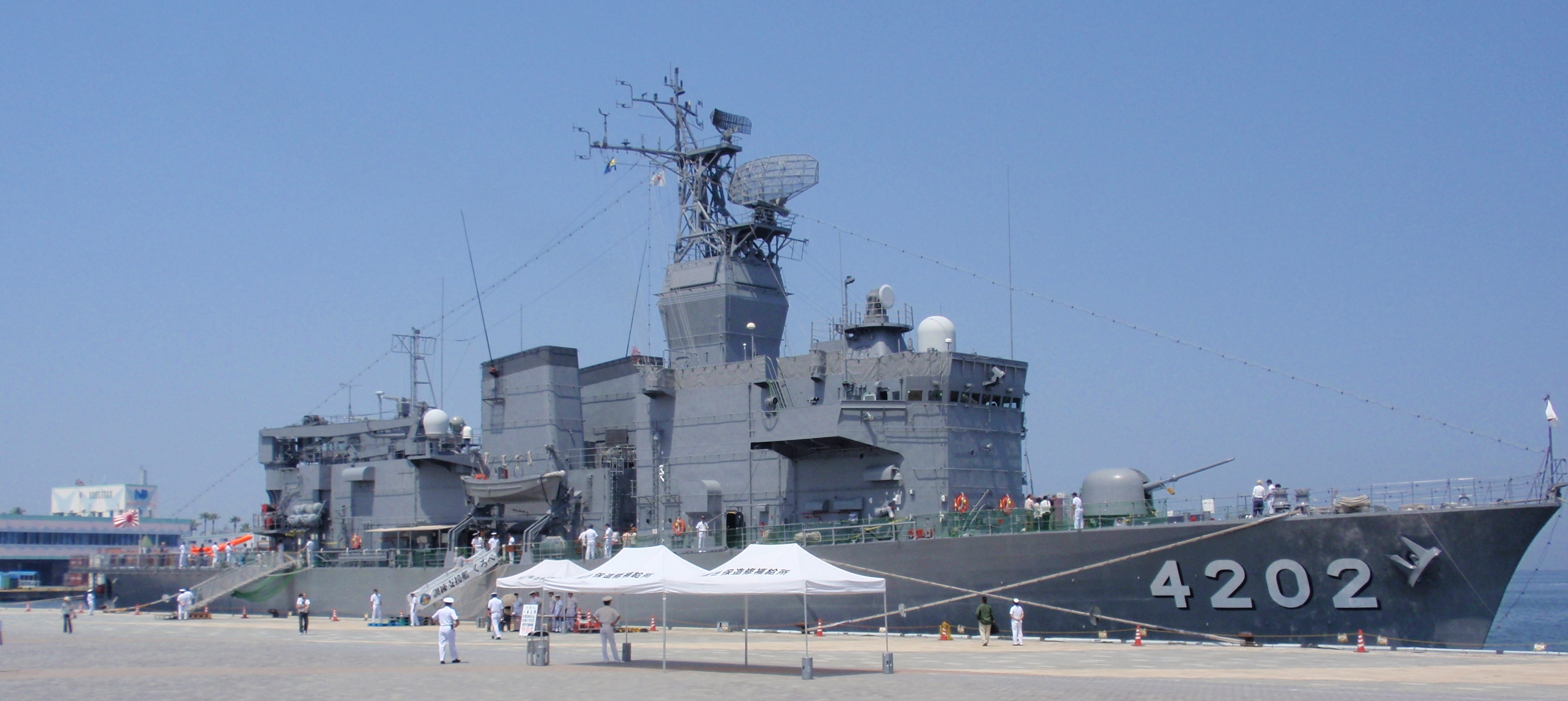
JS Kurobe at Hakata on 27 May 2012.

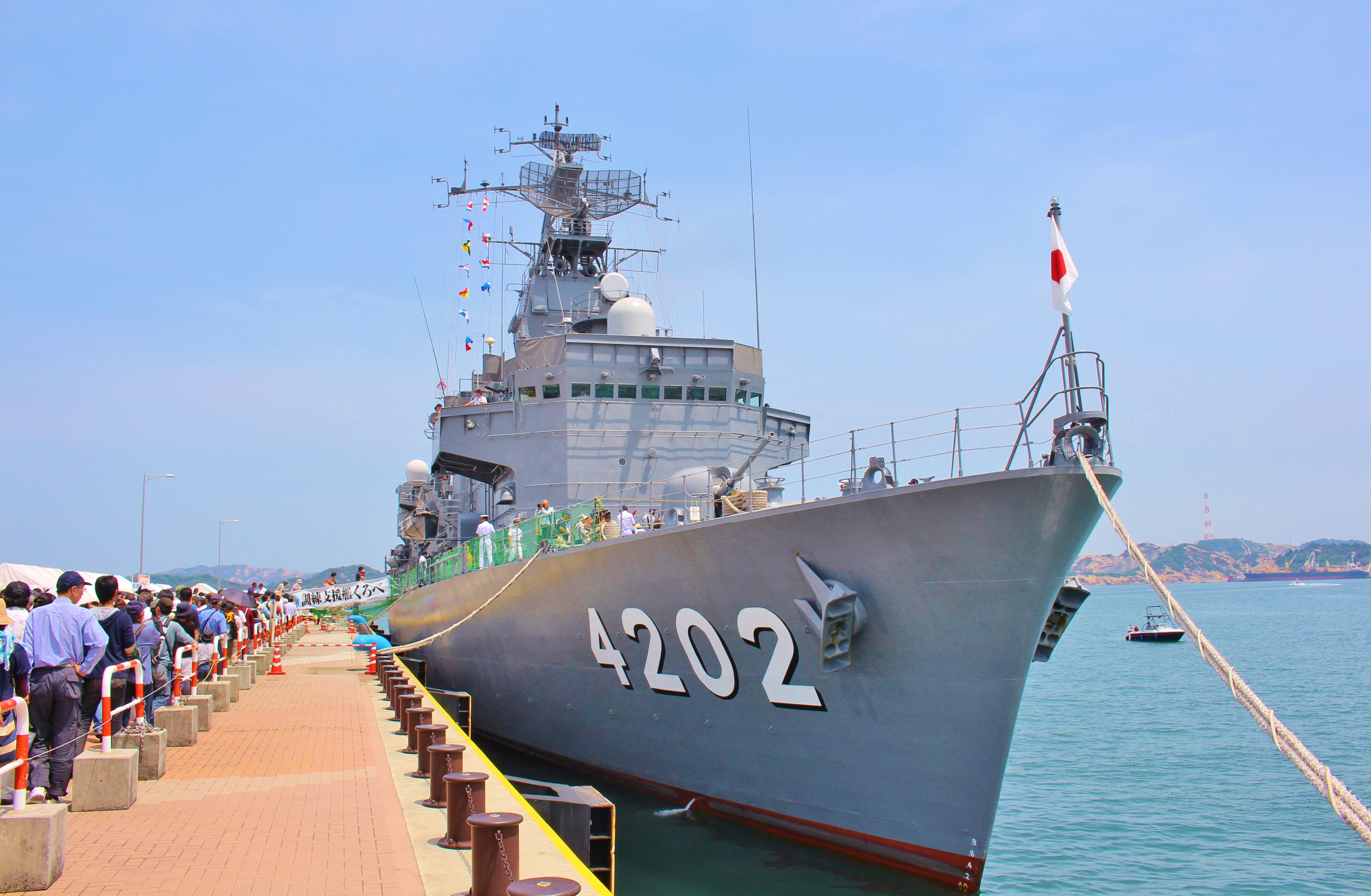
JS Kurobe on 24 May 2014.

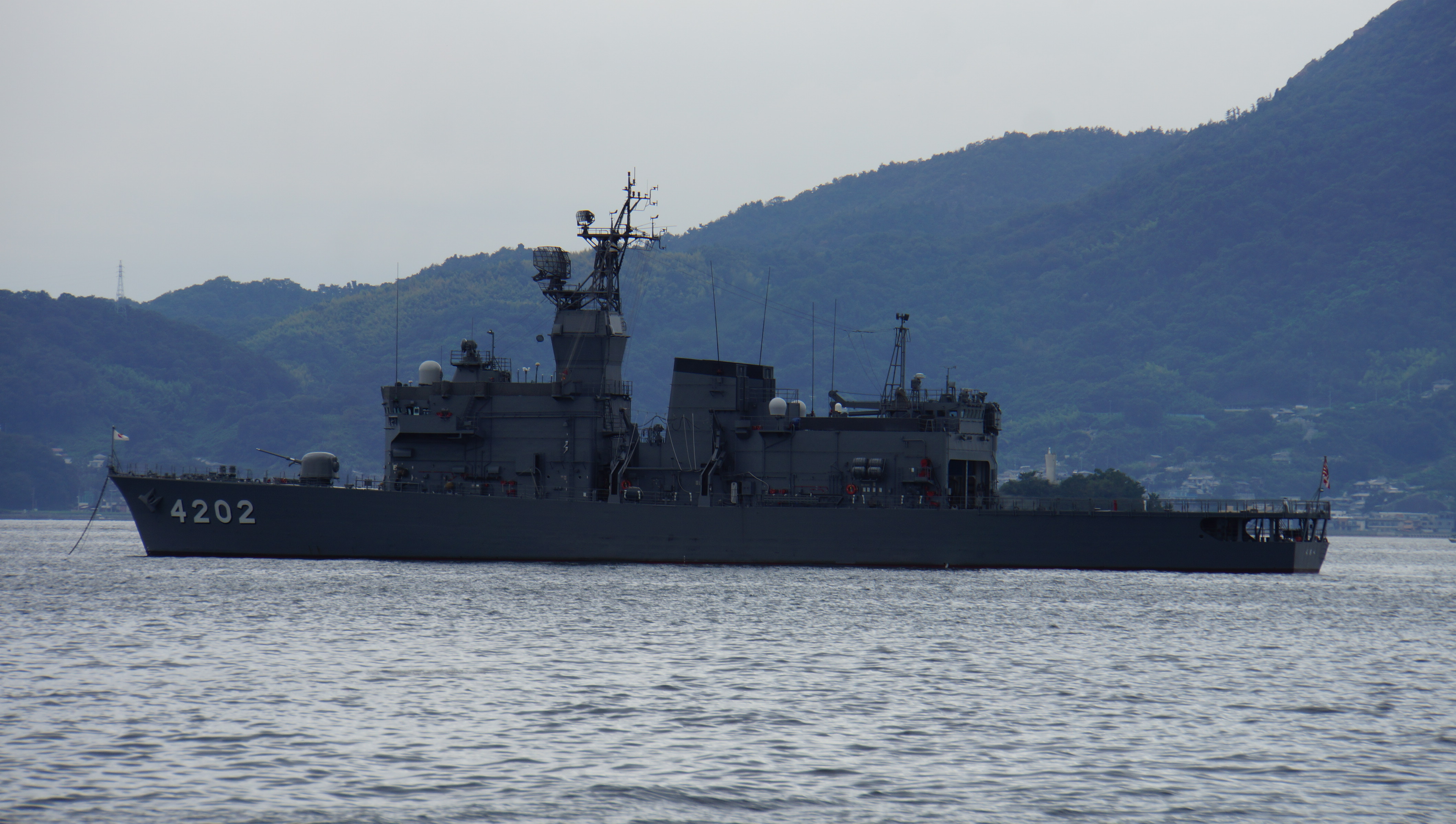
JS Kurobe at Kure Naval Base on 15 September 2014.

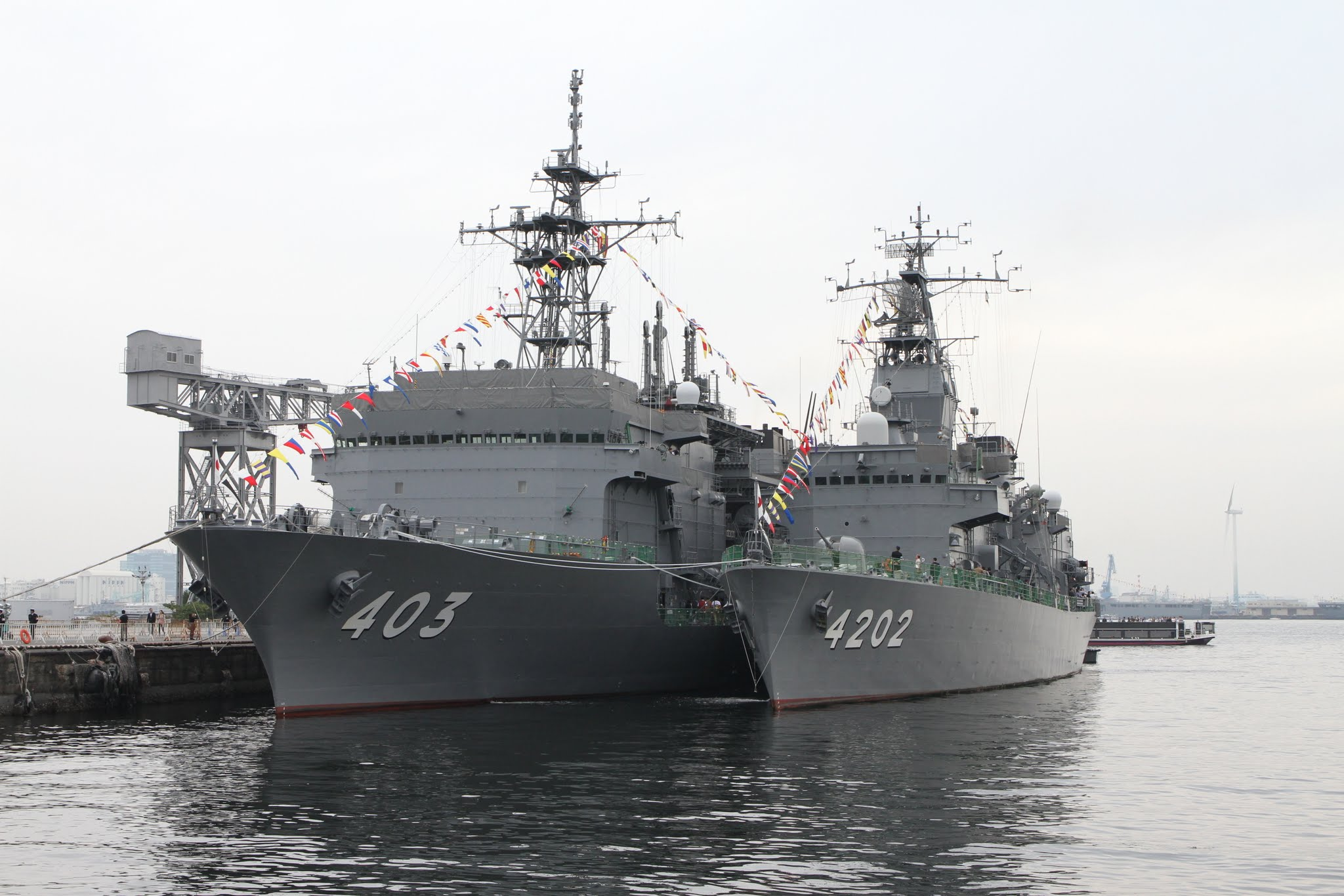
JS Kurobe alongside JS Chihaya at Yokosuka on 10 October 2015.

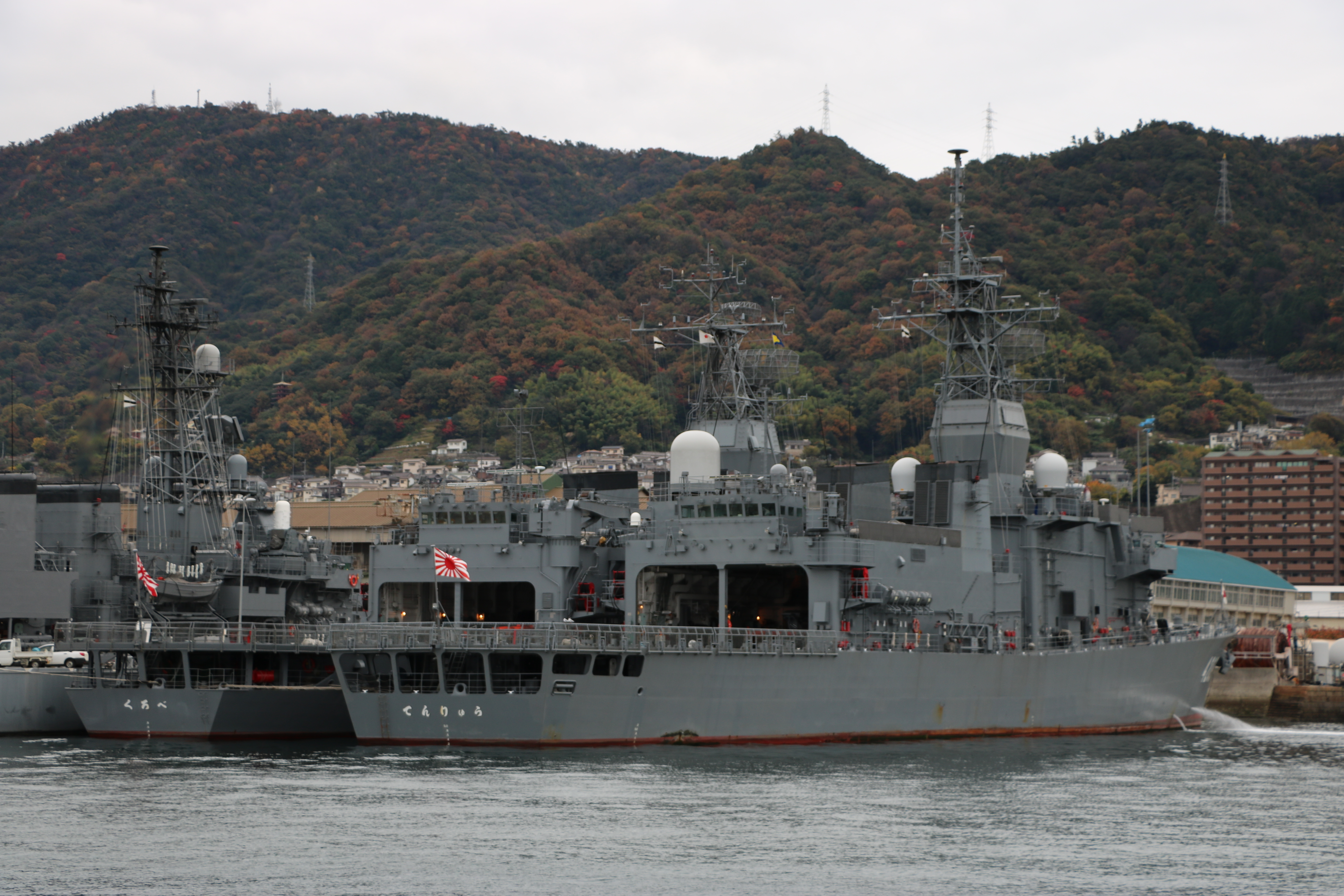
JS Kurobe and JS Tenryū at Kure Naval Base on 23 November 2016.
