= JS Tenryū =

Training ship Tenryū

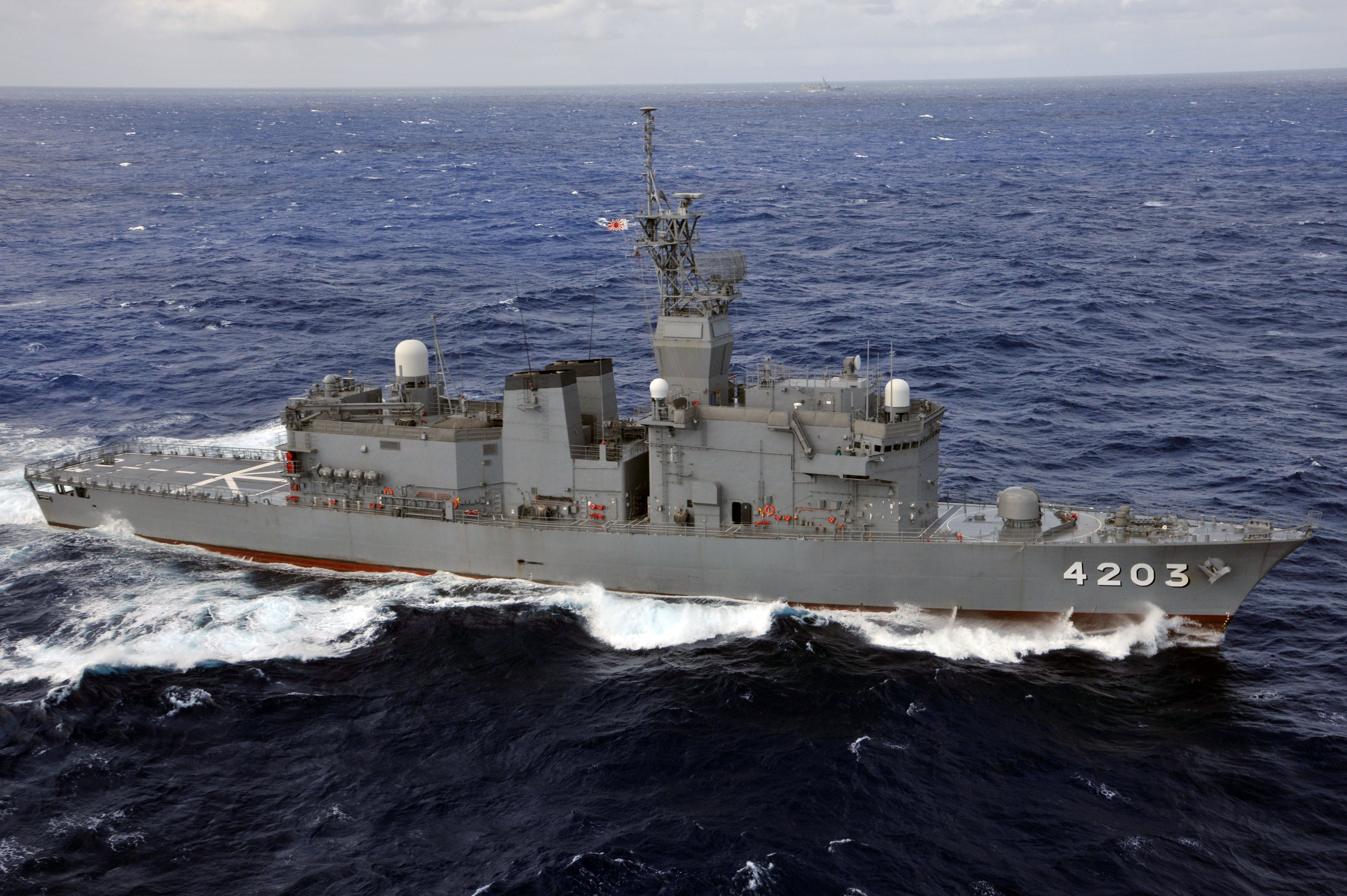
- JS Tenryū

History

Japan
- Name: Tenryū; (てんりゅう)
- Ordered: 1977
- Builder: Sumitomo, Yokosuka
- Laid down: 19 June 1998
- Launched: 14 April 1999
- Commissioned: 17 March 2000
- Home port: Kure
- Identification: MMSI number: 431999641; Callsign: JSPW; Pennant number: ATS-4203
- Status: Active

Class overview
- Preceded by: Kurobe class
- Succeeded by: N/A

General characteristics
- Class & type: Training ship
- Displacement: 2,450–2,750 long tons (2,489–2,794 t) full load
- Length: 106.0 m (347 ft 9 in)
- Beam: 16.5 m (54 ft 2 in)
- Draught: 8.6 m (28 ft 3 in)
- Depth: 4.1 m (13 ft 5 in)
- Propulsion: 4 × CODAD diesel engines
- Speed: 22 knots (41 km/h; 25 mph)
- Range: 5,500 nmi (10,200 km; 6,300 mi) at 20 kn (37 km/h; 23 mph)
- Complement: 170
- Sensors & processing systems: OPS-14 anti-aircraft; OPS-18; OPS-20; Type 81 fire control system type 2-22D
- Electronic warfare & decoys: Target aircraft multiple control system; BQM-34AJ high-speed target system; Missile evaluation device
- Armament: 1 × OTO Melara 76 mm gun
- Aircraft carried: 4 x BQM-74E Unmanned target aircraft Chaka III
- Aviation facilities: Hangar and helipad

JS Tenryū (ATS-4203) is a training support ship of Japan Maritime Self-Defense Force.

== Development and design ==
It is a ship for anti-aircraft shooting training support, and its main purpose is to launch and guide unmanned target aircraft. It was built as a complement to the air threat, higher performance of air defense weapons, and the obsolescence of the predecessor training ship JDS Azuma.

It is a flat deck type ship type, equipped with one 76-millimetre (3.0 in) single gun on the front deck. The target aircraft will be equipped with four BQM-74E Chaka III. These target aircraft are launched from the rear helipad, and up to three aircraft can be simultaneously guided and controlled by a four-sided phased array radar on the top of the ship's structure. A radar for evaluating shooting results is also installed separately.

== Construction and career ==
Tenryū was laid down on 19 June 1998 at Sumitomo Heavy Industries, Yokosuka and launched on 14 April 1999. The vessel commissioned on 17 March 2000. Currently, she belongs to the 1st Maritime Training Support Corps of the Escort Fleet, and the fixed port is Kure.

On March 26, 2008, the 1st Maritime Training Support Corps was newly formed under the escort fleet and was incorporated together with JS Kurobe.

The ship was dispatched to aid in recovery following the Great East Japan Earthquake caused by the 2011 off the Pacific coast of Tohoku Earthquake on March 11, 2011.

In February 2020, Master Sergeant Kazumi Sakoda was appointed as the first female SDF officer's senior corporal.

== Gallery ==
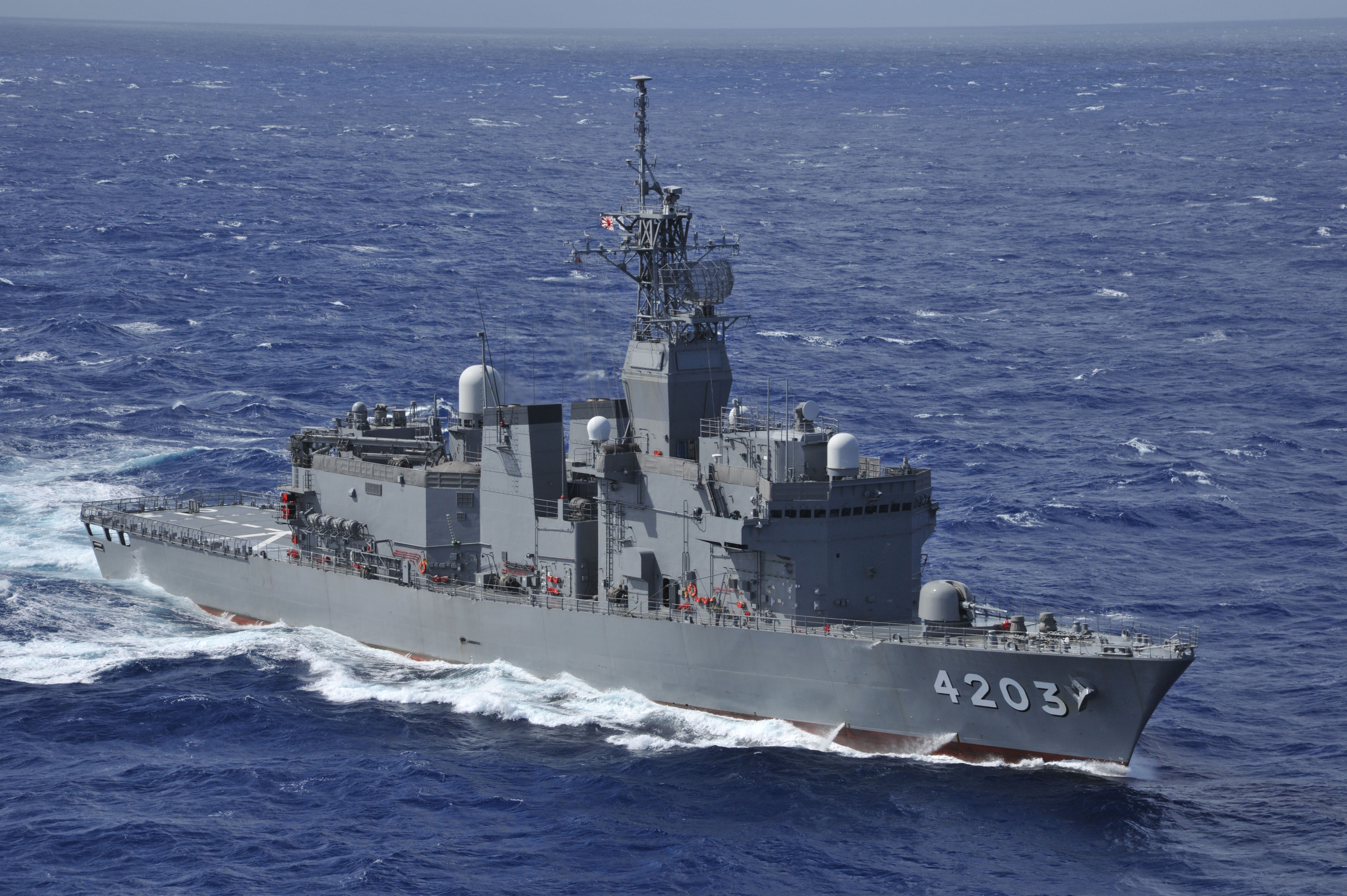
JS Tenryū underway, date unknown.

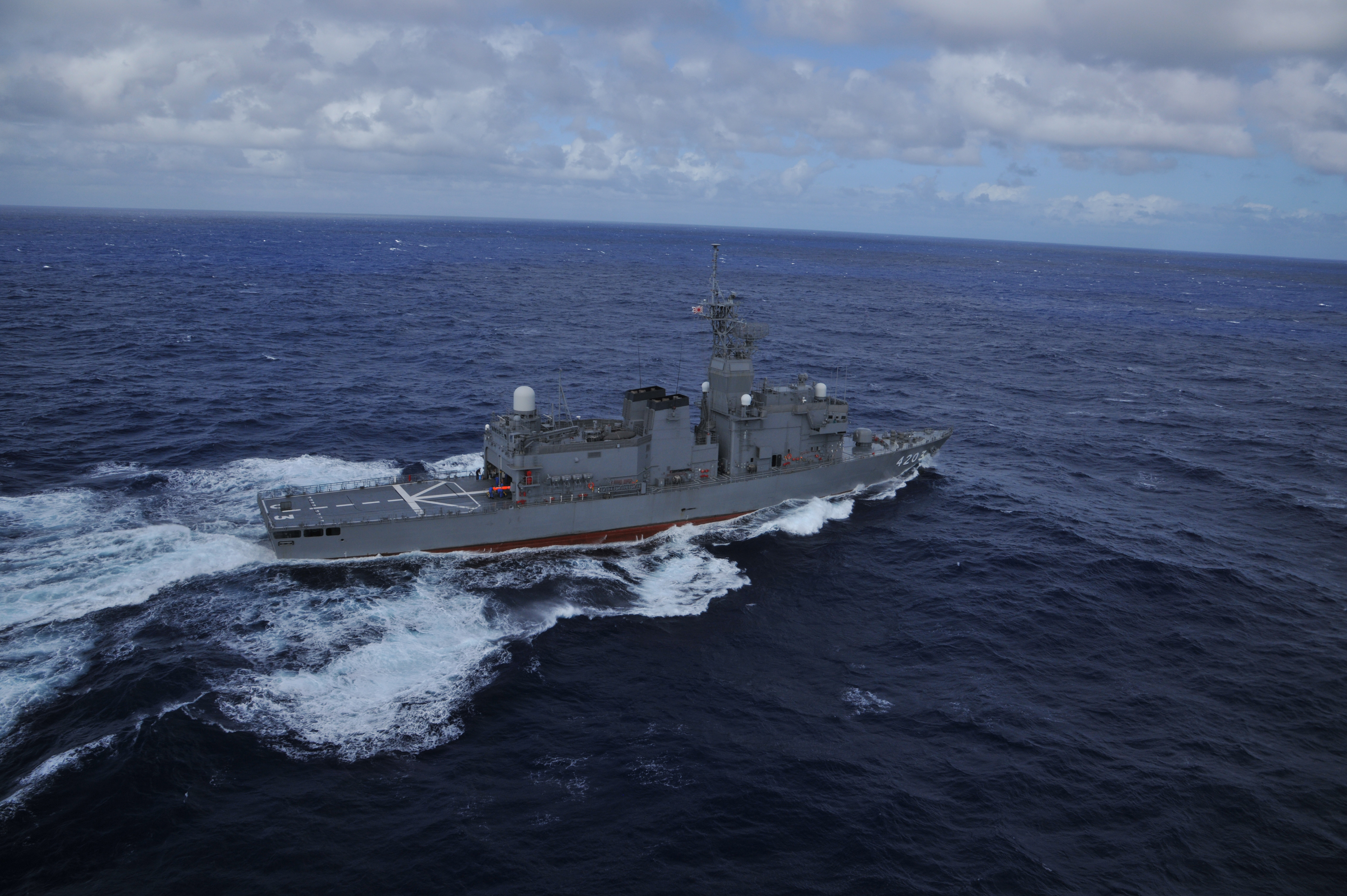
JS Tenryū underway, date unknown.

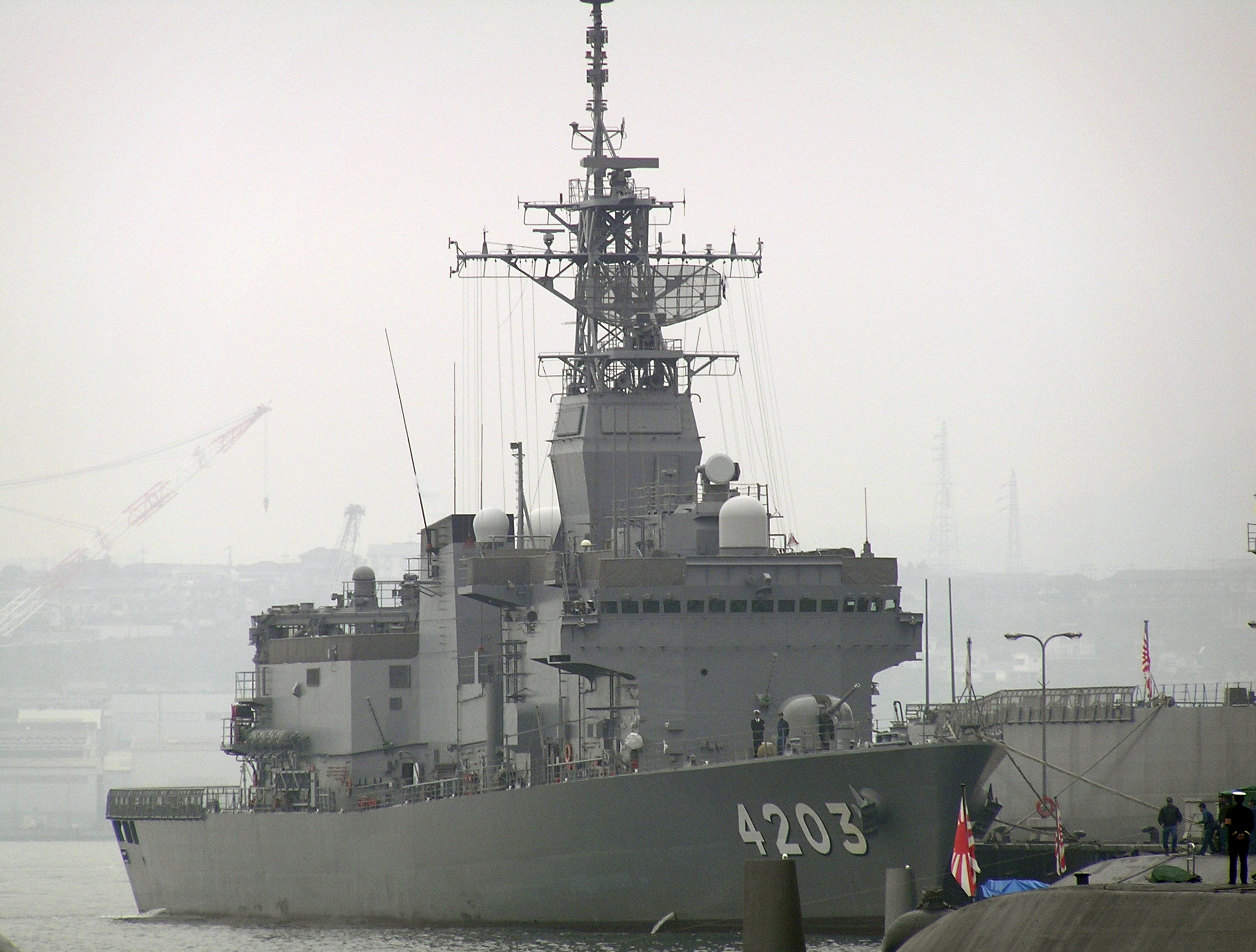
JS Tenryū at Kure on 18 March 2006.

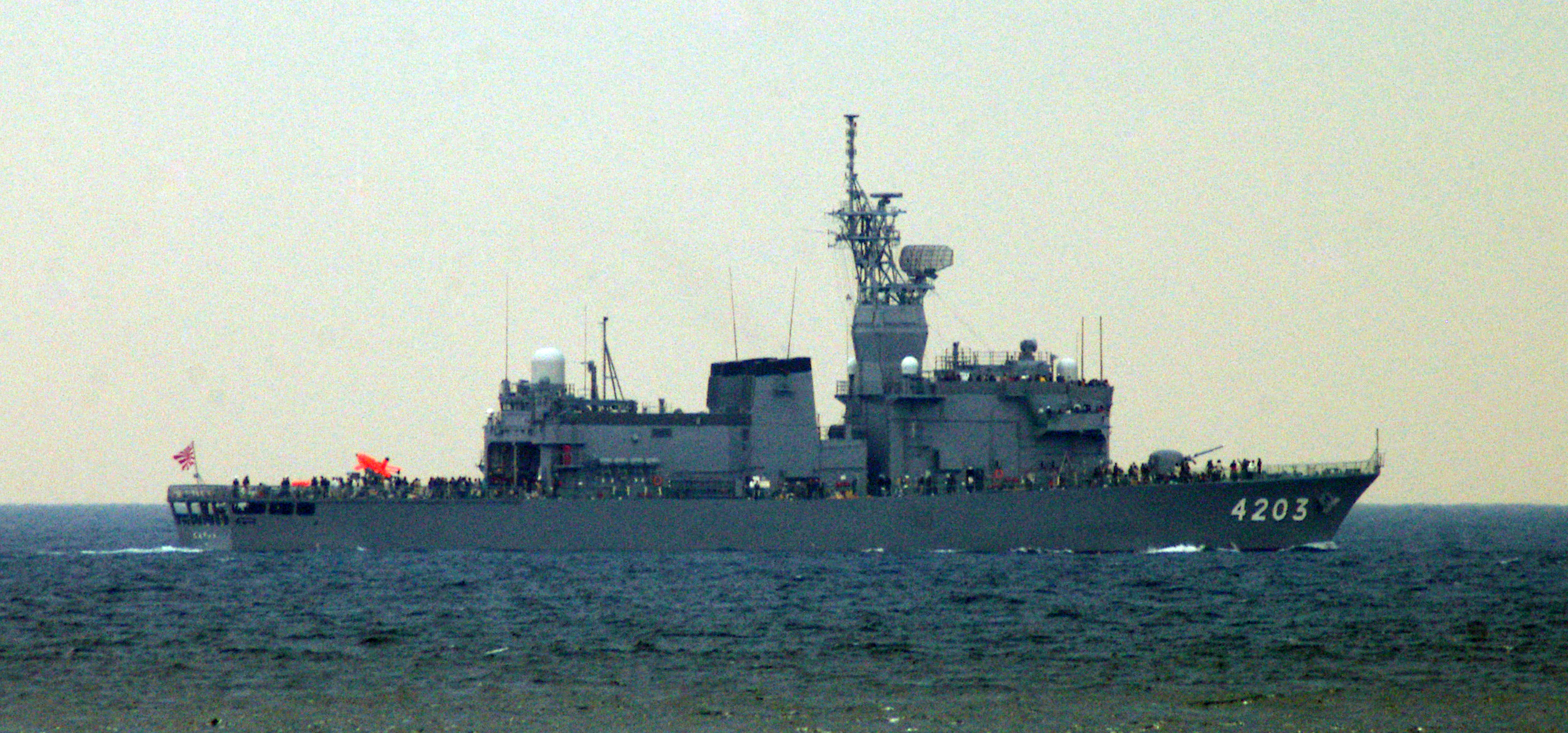
JS Tenryū on 29 October 2006.

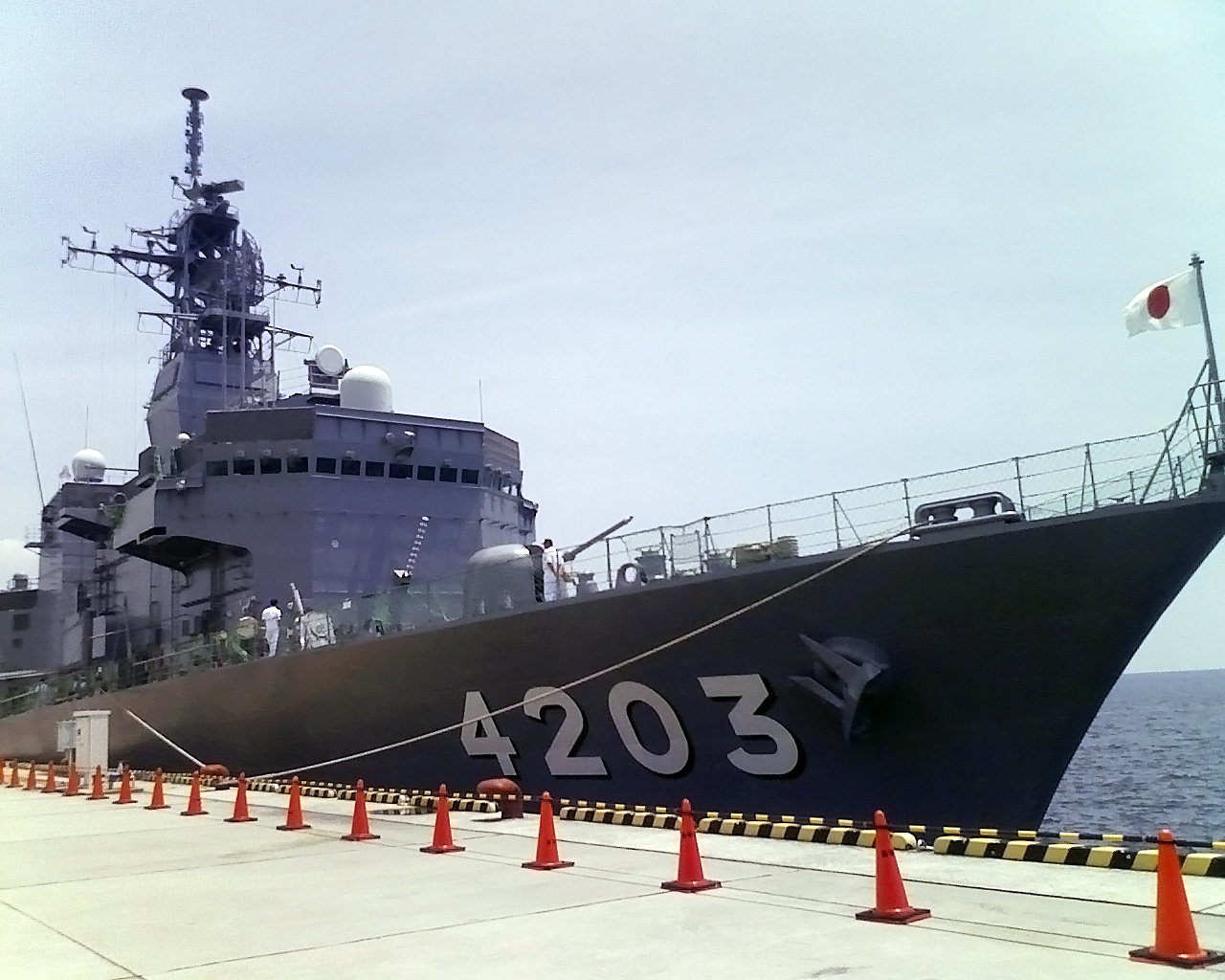
JS Tenryū at Hanshin on 20 July 2008.

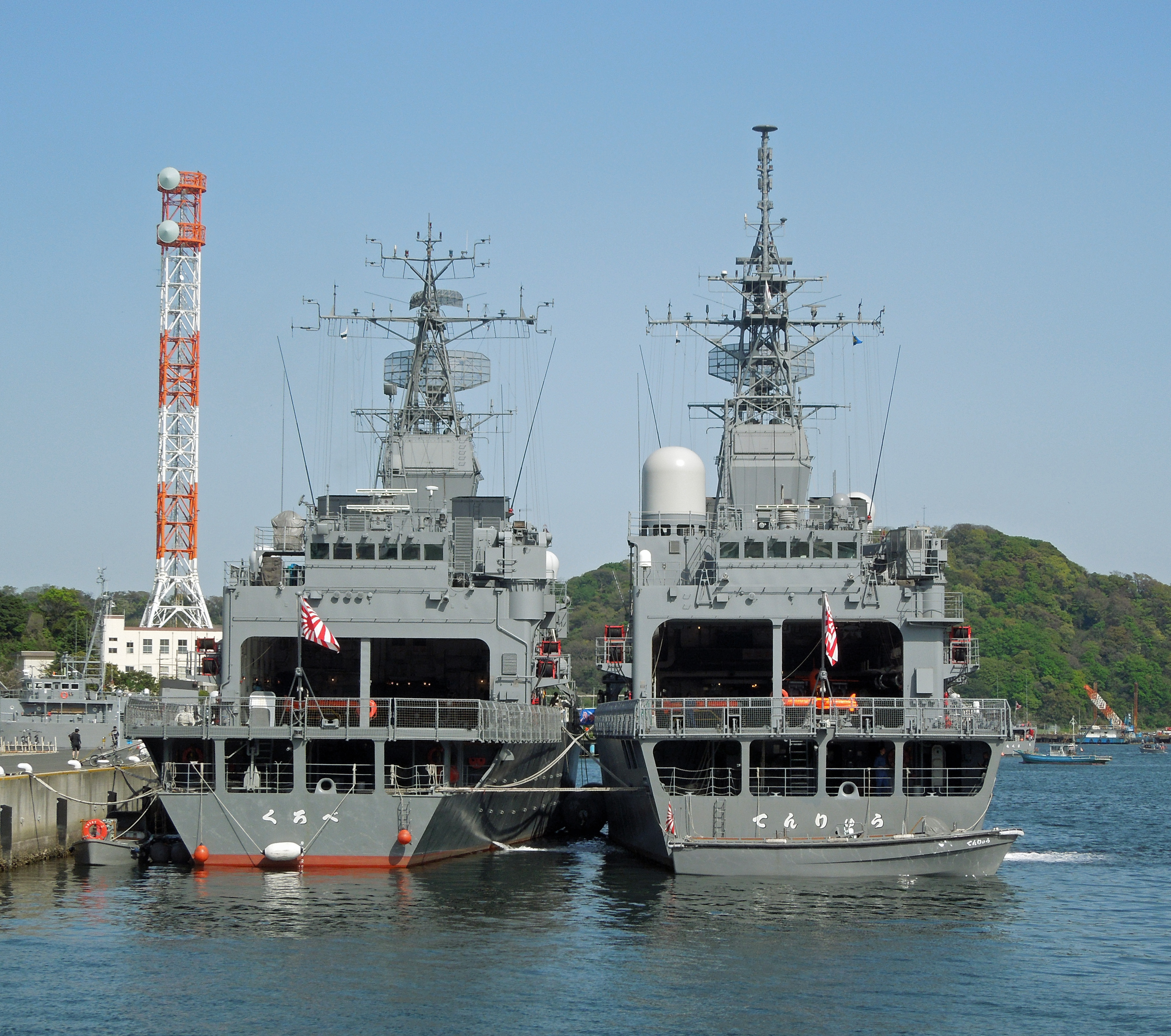
JS Tenryū and JS Kurobe at Kure on 15 April 2016.

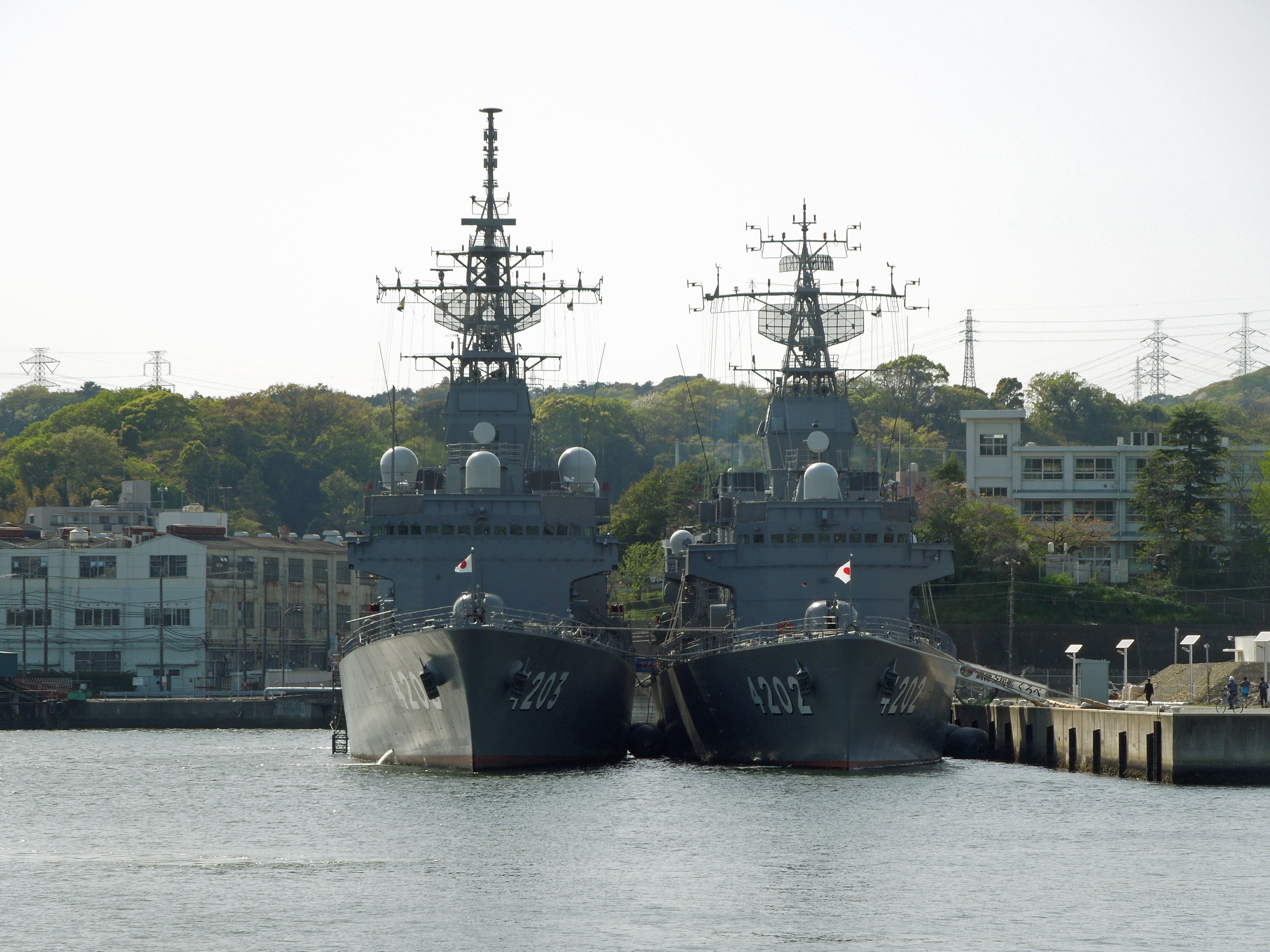
JS Tenryū and JS Kurobe at Kure on 15 April 2016.

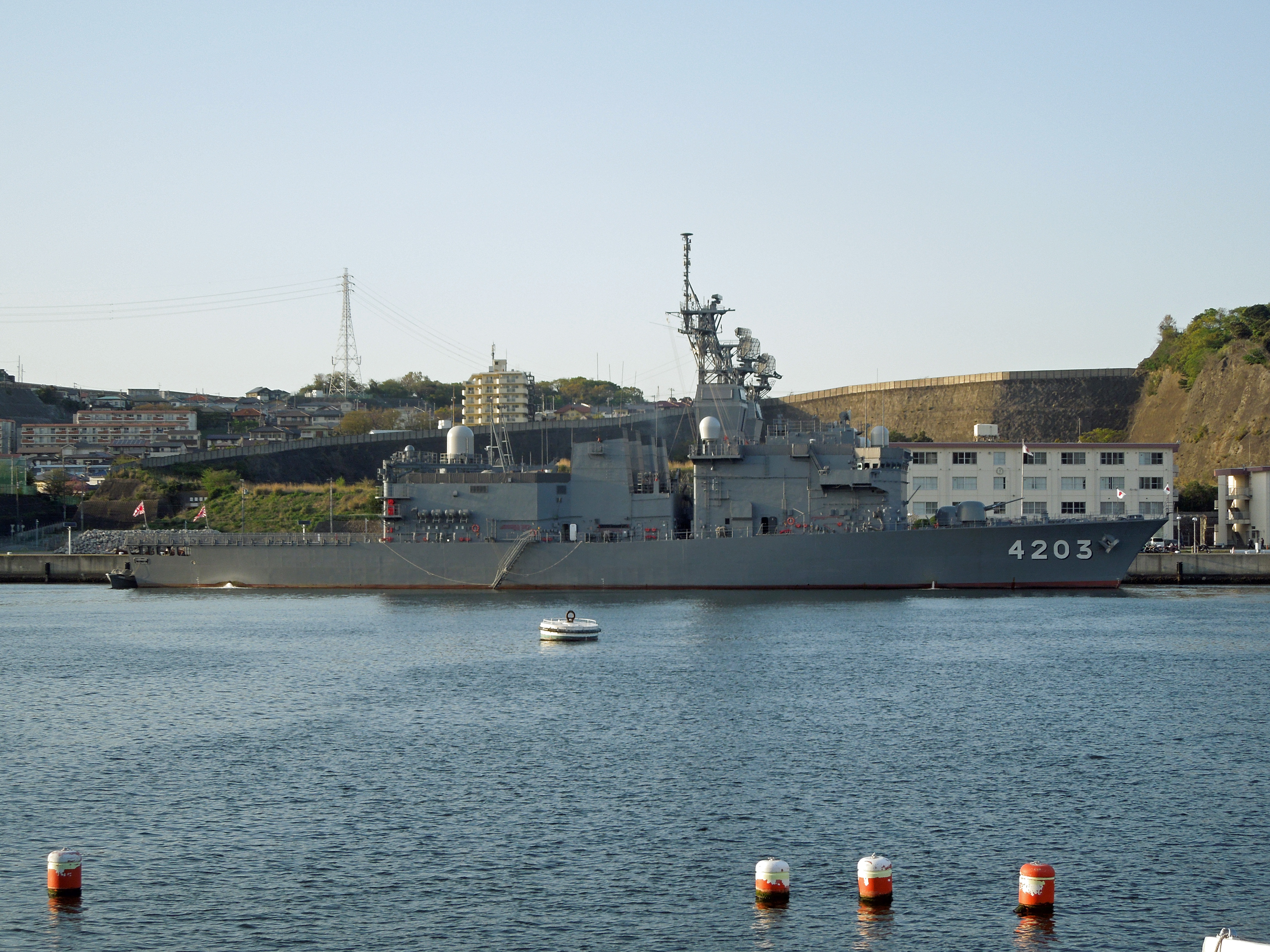
JS Tenryū at Kure on 15 April 2016.

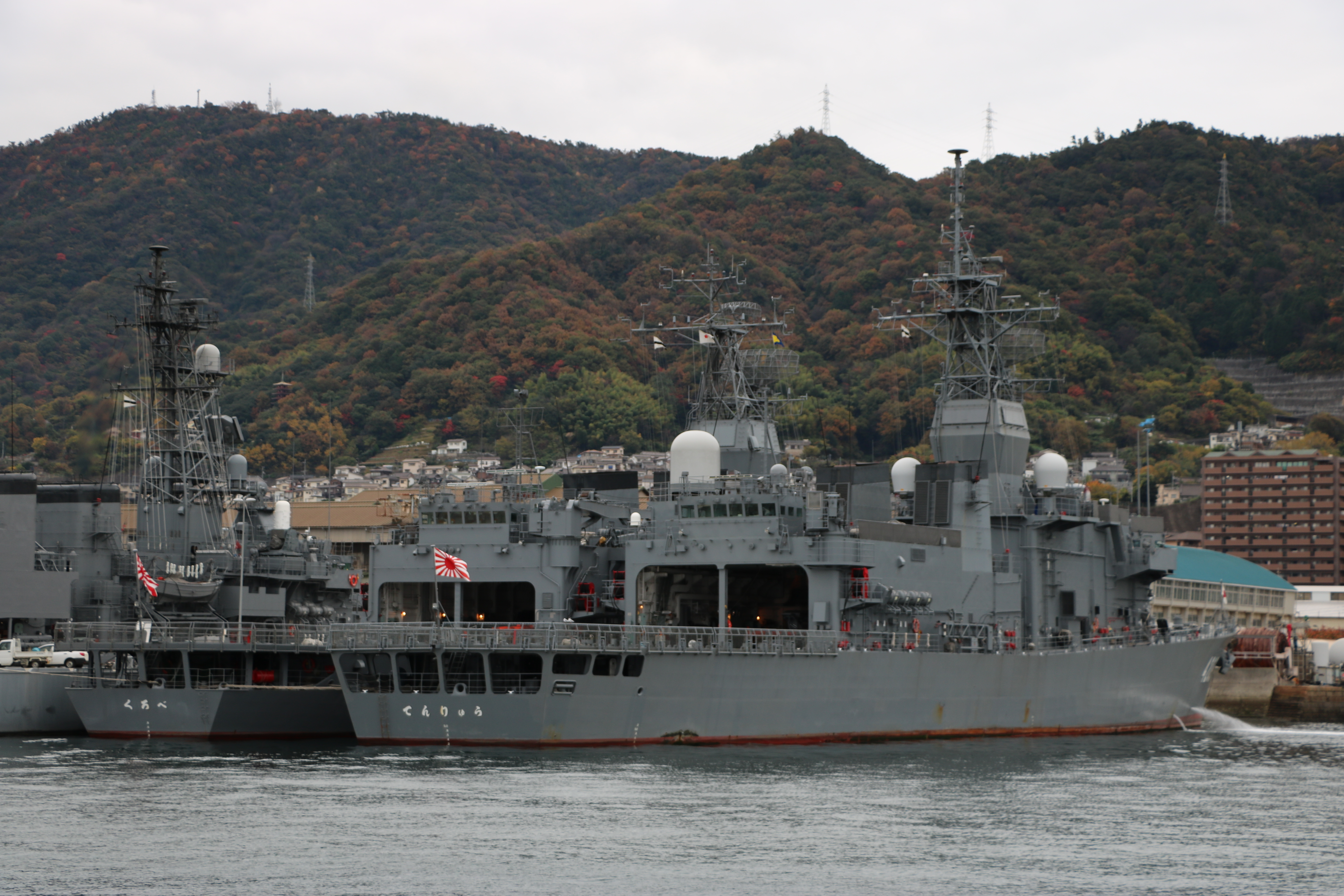
JS Tenryū and JS Kurobe at Kure Naval Base on 23 November 2016.
