= Fleet Escort Force =

Ships of the Japanese navy

- 護衛艦隊
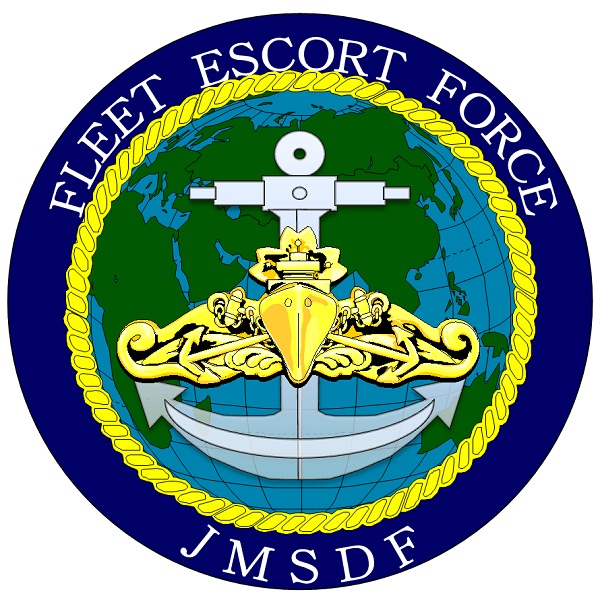
- Fleet Escort Force emblem
- Active: 1 September 1961 – present
- Country: Japan
- Allegiance: Japan
- Branch: Japan Maritime Self-Defense Force
- Role: Fleet
- Size: approx 10,000 people
- Part of: Japan Maritime Self-Defense Force
- Garrison/HQ: Yokosuka
- Anniversaries: 1 September
- Website: https://www.mod.go.jp/msdf/efhq/

Commanders
- Commander: Vice Admiral Goka Yoshihiro

The Fleet Escort Force (Japanese: 護衛艦隊, Hepburn: Goei Kantai) is the main force of the Self Defense Fleet of the Japan Maritime Self-Defense Force, and played a central role in the Maritime Self-Defense Force, which mainly consists of escort vessels and various other ships. Together with the Fleet Submarine Force, Mine Warfare Force, and Fleet Air Force, it is responsible for Japan's maritime defense.

== History ==
On September 4, 2024, it is reported that the JMSDF will abolish the FEF with the MWF and replace it with the Fleet Surface Force. The FEF name will be retired by March 2026.

== Organization ==
The Fleet Escort Force command center is located in the Funakoshi district of Yokosuka base (7-73, Funakoshi-cho, Yokosuka city, Kanagawa prefecture), and the commander of the escort fleet is assigned by the officer. The commander of the escort fleet manages the training of the escort fleet, which consists of a total of 48 escort ships and a large number of auxiliary ships, exclusively as a force provider (training manager), and is a force user (situation handling) that operates the escort ship in an emergency. (Responsible person) It is responsible for providing the commander of the Self-Defense Fleet and the subordinate corps to each district general manager. As of March 2020, four escort groups (Escort Flotilla) have been formed as the main force under the escort fleet. Each escort group commander is assigned by an assistant sea general, and each escort group consists of one helicopter-mounted escort ship (DDH), one missile escort ship (DDG), and two general-purpose escort ships (DDH group); as well as two Escort Divisions (DDG Group) consisting of one missile escort ship (DDG) and three general-purpose escort ships (Escort Division), a total of 32 escort ships are prepared for emergencies.

By having four escort groups, one or two escort groups can always be trained in a highly trained state while performing periodic training (rotation), and a ready response system against threats can be established. Ships must undergo regular maintenance, repairs and refurbishment work in the dock, and after a long period of docking, crew retraining is required, and if there are new ships or new equipment, proficiency training This kind of rotation is needed to maintain maritime defense capabilities at all times, as there is a need for long-term pelagic dispatches for courtesy visits to foreign countries and joint military operations.

In addition to the 32 ships of the 4 escort group, a total of 16 escort ships (small B-type escort ship and old general-purpose escort ship) are deployed in 5 escorts under the direct control of the escort fleet. The local general manager will operate it. In the Summary of Defense Plan for 2014 and beyond, the number of escorts under the direct control of the escort fleet will be expanded to six, and the total number of escort vessels will be increased to 54.

=== Escort Flotilla 1 (Yokosuka) ===
- Escort Squadron 1: DDH-183 Izumo; DDG-179 Maya; DD-101 Murasame; DD-107 Ikazuchi (Yokosuka)
- Escort Squadron 5: DDG-173 Kongō; DD-108 Akebono; DD-109 Ariake; DD-115 Akizuki (Sasebo)

=== Escort Flotilla 2 (Sasebo) ===
- Escort Squadron 2: DDH-182 Ise; DDG-178 Ashigara; DD-102 Harusame; DD-119 Asahi (Sasebo)
- Escort Squadron 6: DDG-174 Kirishima; DD-110 Takanami; DD-111 Onami; DD-116 Teruzuki (Yokosuka)

=== Escort Flotilla 3 (Maizuru) ===
- Escort Squadron 3: DDH-181 Hyūga; DDG-175 Myōkō; DDG-177 Atago; DD-118 Fuyuzuki (Maizuru)
- Escort Squadron 7: DD-103 Yudachi; DD-112 Makinami; DD-114 Suzunami; DD-120 Shiranui (Ominato)

=== Escort Flotilla 4 (Kure) ===
- Escort Squadron 4: DDH-184 Kaga; DD-105 Inazuma; DD-106 Samidare; DD-113 Sazanami (Kure)
- Escort Squadron 8: DDG-172 Shimakaze; DDG-176 Chōkai; DD-104 Kirisame; DD-117 Suzutsuki (Sasebo)

=== Naval District Forces ===
- 11th Escort Squadron: DD-152 Yamagiri; DD-153 Yūgiri; DD-154 Amagiri (Yokosuka)
- 12th Escort Squadron: DD-158 Umigiri; DE-229 Abukuma; DE-234 Tone (Kure)
- 13th Escort Squadron: DD-157 Sawagiri; DE-230 Jintsū (Sasebo)
- 14th Escort Squadron: DD-151 Asagiri; DE-232 Sendai; DD-156 Setogiri (Maizuru)
- 15th Escort Squadron: DD-155 Hamagiri; DE-231 Ōyodo; DE-233 Chikuma (Ominato)

1st Replenishment-at-Sea Squadron (Yokosuka): AOE-422 Towada (Kure); AOE-423 Tokiwa (Yokosuka); AOE-424 Hamana (Sasebo); AOE-425 Mashu (Maizuru); AOE-426 Omi (Sasebo)

1st Training Support Squadron: ATS-4202 Kurobe; ATS-4203 Tenryu; (Kure)

Fleet Training Command (Yokosuka)
