= JMSDF Kure Naval Base =

Naval base in Hiroshima Prefecture, Japan

Kure Naval Base
- 呉基地
- Part of JMSDF Kure District
- Kure, Hiroshima in Japan
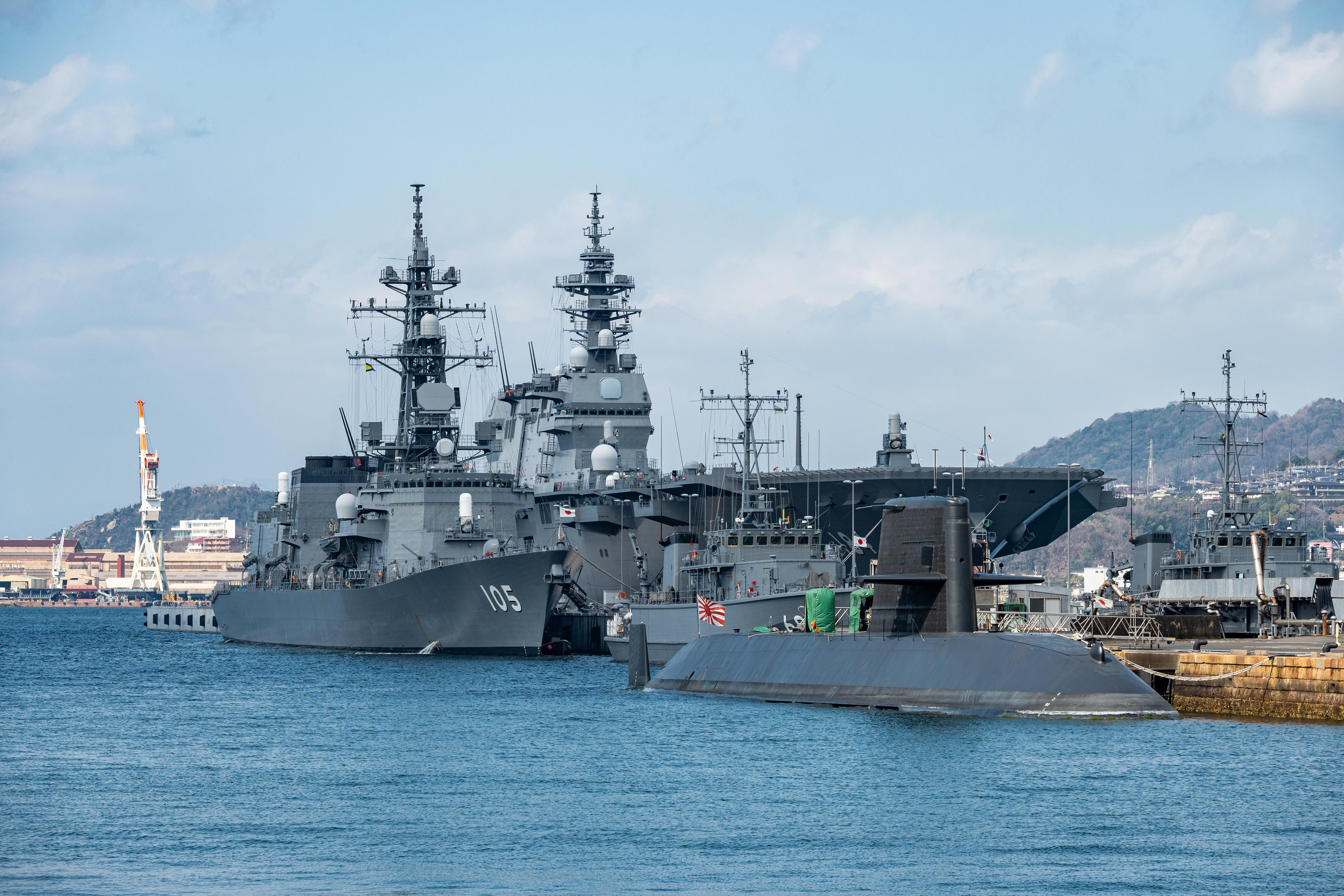

Site information
- Type: Naval base
- Owner: Japanese Maritime Self-Defense Force
- Operator: Japan Maritime Self-Defense Force
- Website: www.mod.go.jp/msdf/kure/

Location
- Coordinates: 34°13′46″N 132°32′59″E

Site history
- Built: 16 September 1953
- In use: 1953

Garrison information
- Occupants: Self Defense Fleet; Communications Command; JMSDF Kure District; Training Squadron; Mine Warfare Force; Fleet Submarine Force; Oceanography ASW Support Command

The Kure Naval Base (Japanese: 呉基地, Hepburn: Kure Kichi), also simply known as the JMSDF Kure Naval Base, is a group of ports and land facilities of the Japan Maritime Self-Defense Force (JMSDF), which are scattered in multiple districts of Kure City, Hiroshima, and where the JMSDF Kure District, etc. are located.

== History ==
On 1 July 1889, Kure Naval District was established.

On 1 December 1945, Kure Naval District was reorganized into the Kure District Demobilization Bureau following Japan's Surrender in World War II.

On May 1, 1948, it became a member of the 6th Regional Coast Guard Headquarters at the same time as the establishment of the Japan Coast Guard. In July, the Kure Minesweeper Department was set up.

On 1 August 1952, the National Safety Agency Coastal Safety Force was established, and the Kure Route Enlightenment Corps was newly formed under the control of the JMSDF Yokosuka District.

On 16 September 1953, the Kure Route Enlightenment Corps was abolished, and the Kure District Base corps was newly formed under the control of the Yokosuka District Corps.

On July 1, 1954, the National Safety Agency Coastal Safety Force was abolished to make way for the establishment of the Defense Agency Maritime Self-Defense Force. Kure District Force was reorganized. On October 1, opening of the Kure District General Administration Department.

On 16 January 1956, new edition of the Kure Training Corps.

On May 10, 1957, it was renamed from the Kure Training Corps to the Kure Education Corps.

On June 1, 1959, new edition of Kure Torai Coordination Center.

On 1 February 1961, Kure Supply Station and Kure Factory were newly reorganized.

On 2 March 1970, abolished Kure Kosakusho and reorganized Kure Zoukousho and Kure Sanitary Corps. On October 1, renamed from Kure Base Guard to Kure Guard.

On May 11, 1976, new edition of the Kure Music Corps.

On 1 July 1985, the Kure torpedo control station is abolished. New edition of Kure Torai Maintenance Center.

On July 1, 1987, reorganization of the guards. New edition of Kure Base Service Action.

On 8 December 1998, the Kure Supply Station and the Kure Repair Center were integrated due to the reorganization of the supply and maintenance department, and the Kure Repair Supply Station was reorganized, and the Kure Torai Maintenance Center became the Kure Ammunition Maintenance and Supply Station.

On 22 March 2002:, the Kure Communication Corps was reorganized into the Kure System Communication Corps and reorganized under the Communications Command.

On March 1, 2005, the Self-Defense Forces Kure Hospital was opened.

== Facilities and operational units ==
=== Sachi District ===
- JMSDF Kure District
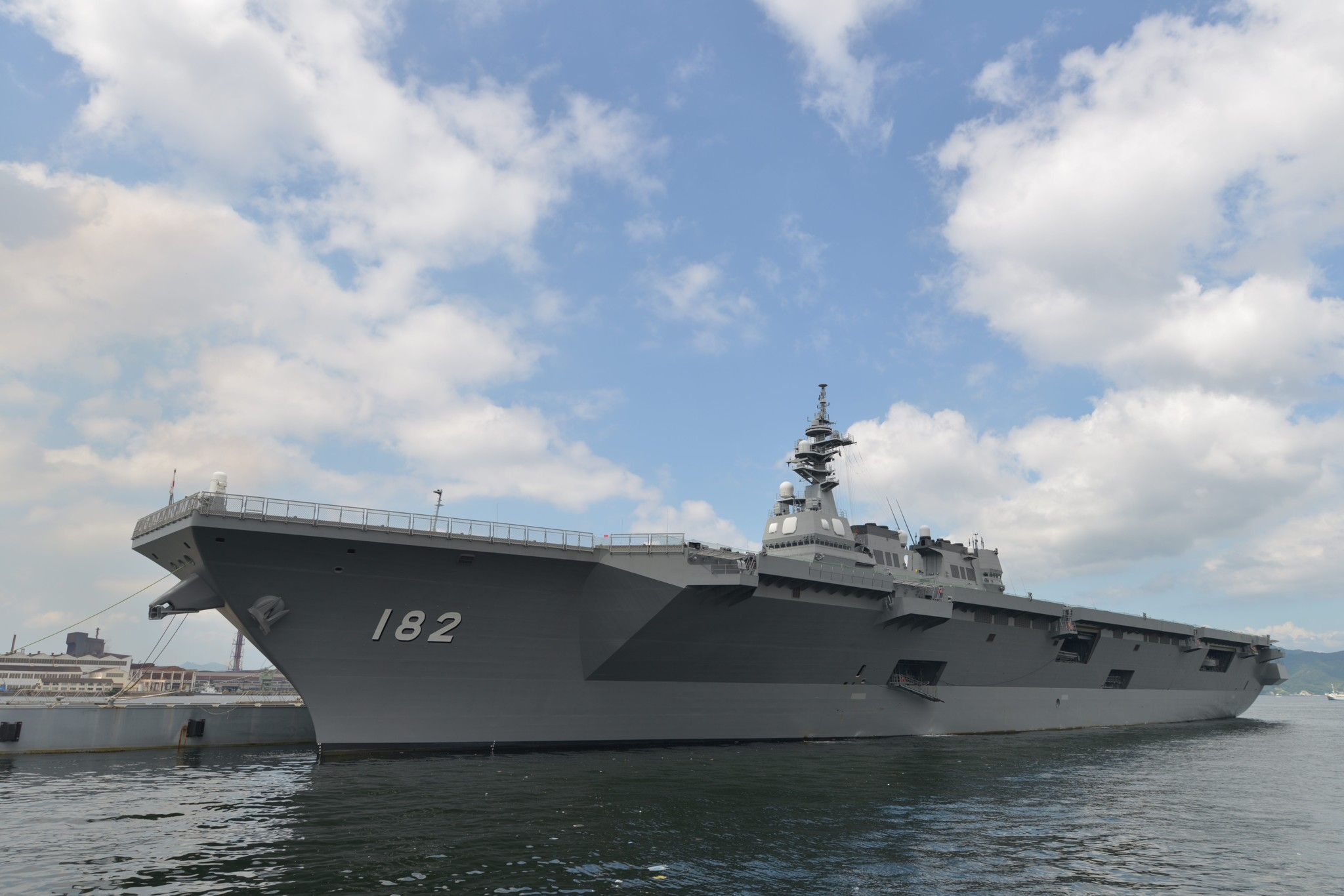
- JS Ise moored at Berth E of Kure Naval Base
  Fleet Escort Force
  - 4th Escort Flotilla
  - 12th Escort Squadron
  - 1st Training Support Squadron
- Training Squadron
  - 1st Training Squadron
- Mine Warfare Force
  - 3rd Minesweeper Squadron
  - 1st Landing Ship Squadron
- Kure District Police
- Kure System Communication Corps
- Kure Guard
- Kure Repair Supply Station
- Kure Base Service Action
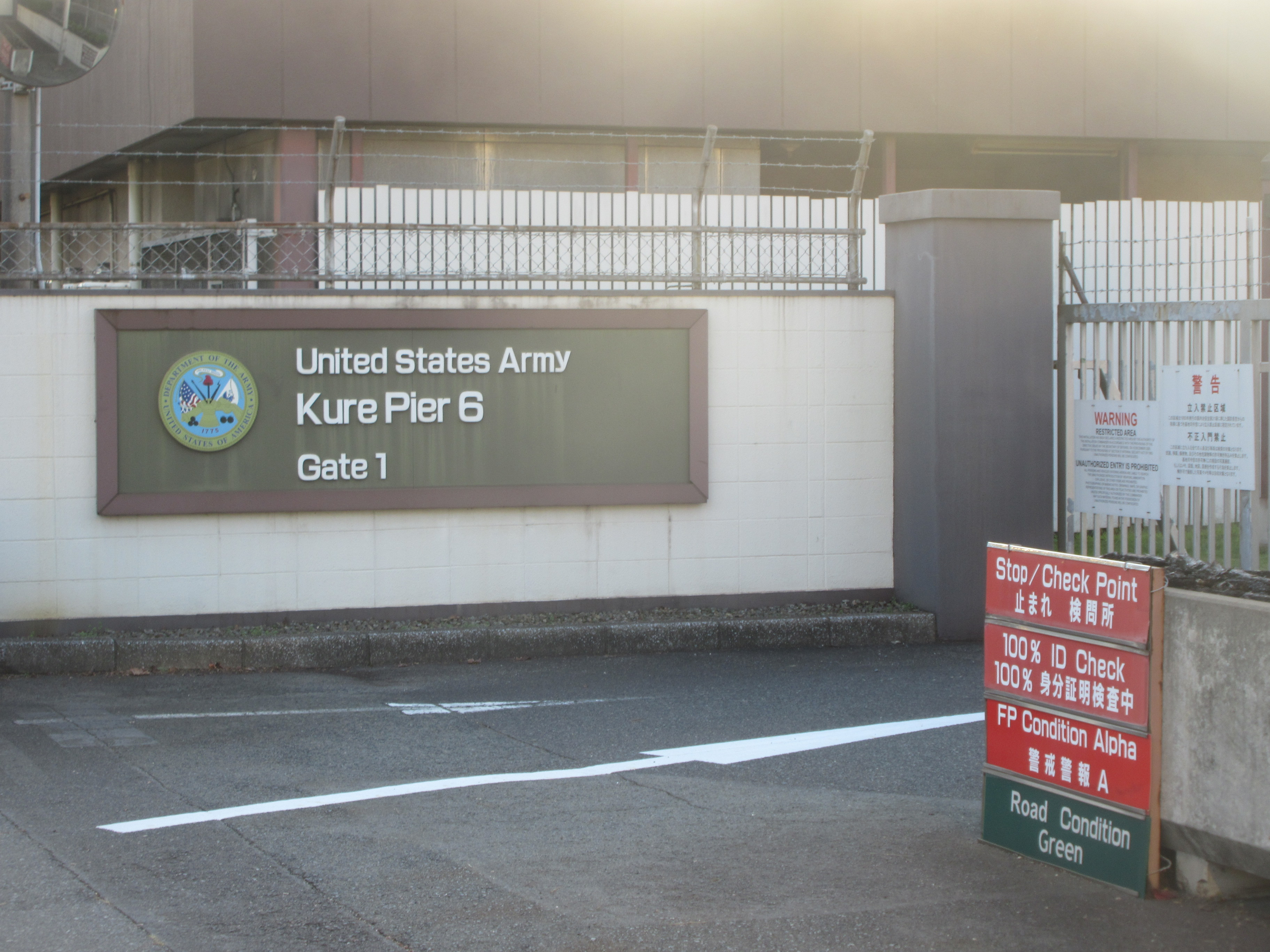
  United States Army Kure Pier 6
- Kure Hygiene Corps
- Kure Education Corps
- Kure Music Corps

=== Shōwa District ===
- Fleet Submarine Force
  - 1st Submarine Squadron
  - 1st Submarine Training Squadron
  - Submarine Training Command
- Marine training guidance team
  - Kure Maritime Training Guidance Team
- Mine Warfare Support Detachment Kure
- Amphibious Warfare / Mine Tactical Support Team
- Oceanography ASW Support Command
  - 1st Acoustic Measurement Corps
- Jieitaikure Hospital

=== Yoshiura District ===
- Kure Repair Supply Station Oil Storage Station

== Gallery ==
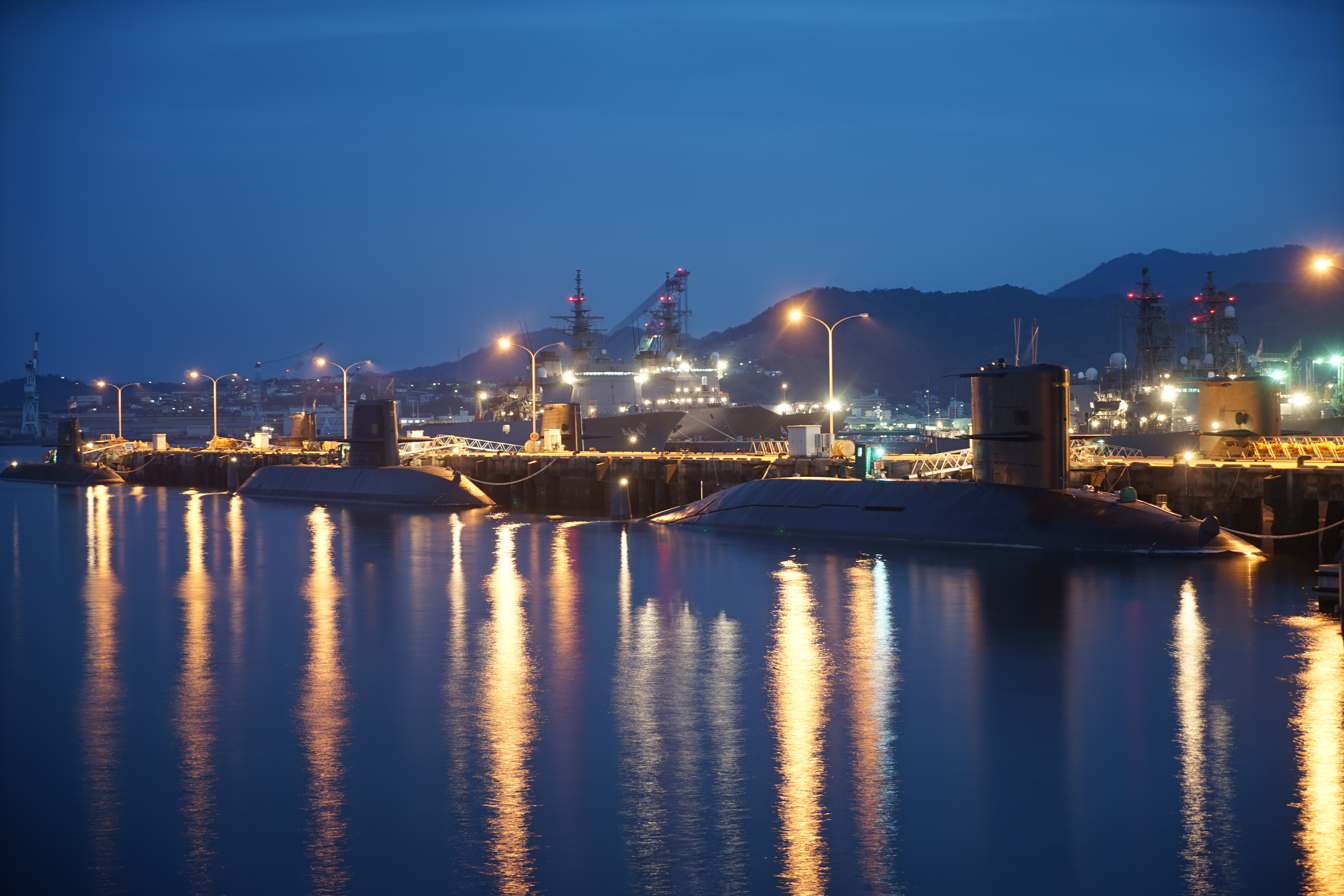
Dawn view of Kure Naval Base

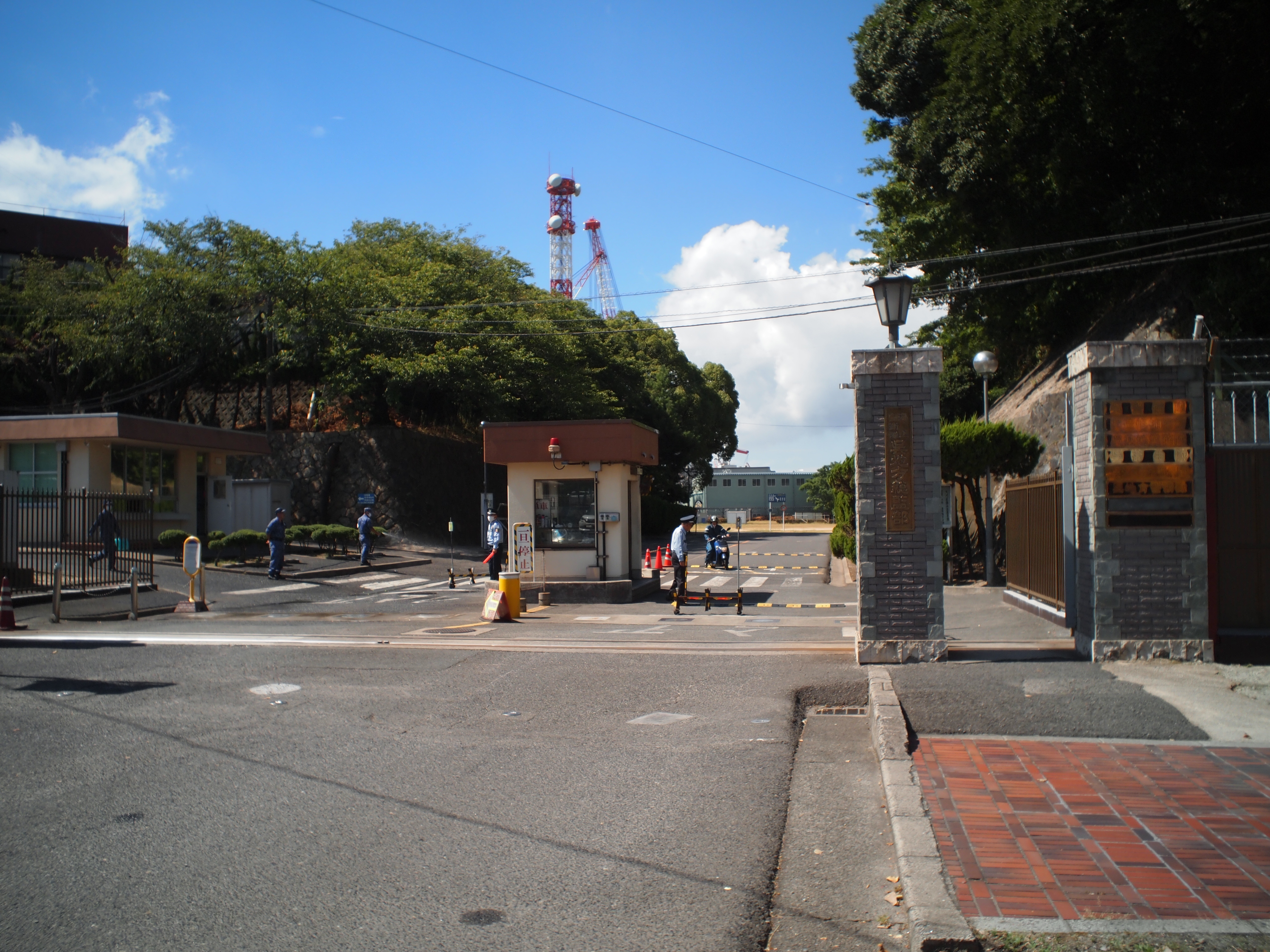
Gate to Kure Naval Base

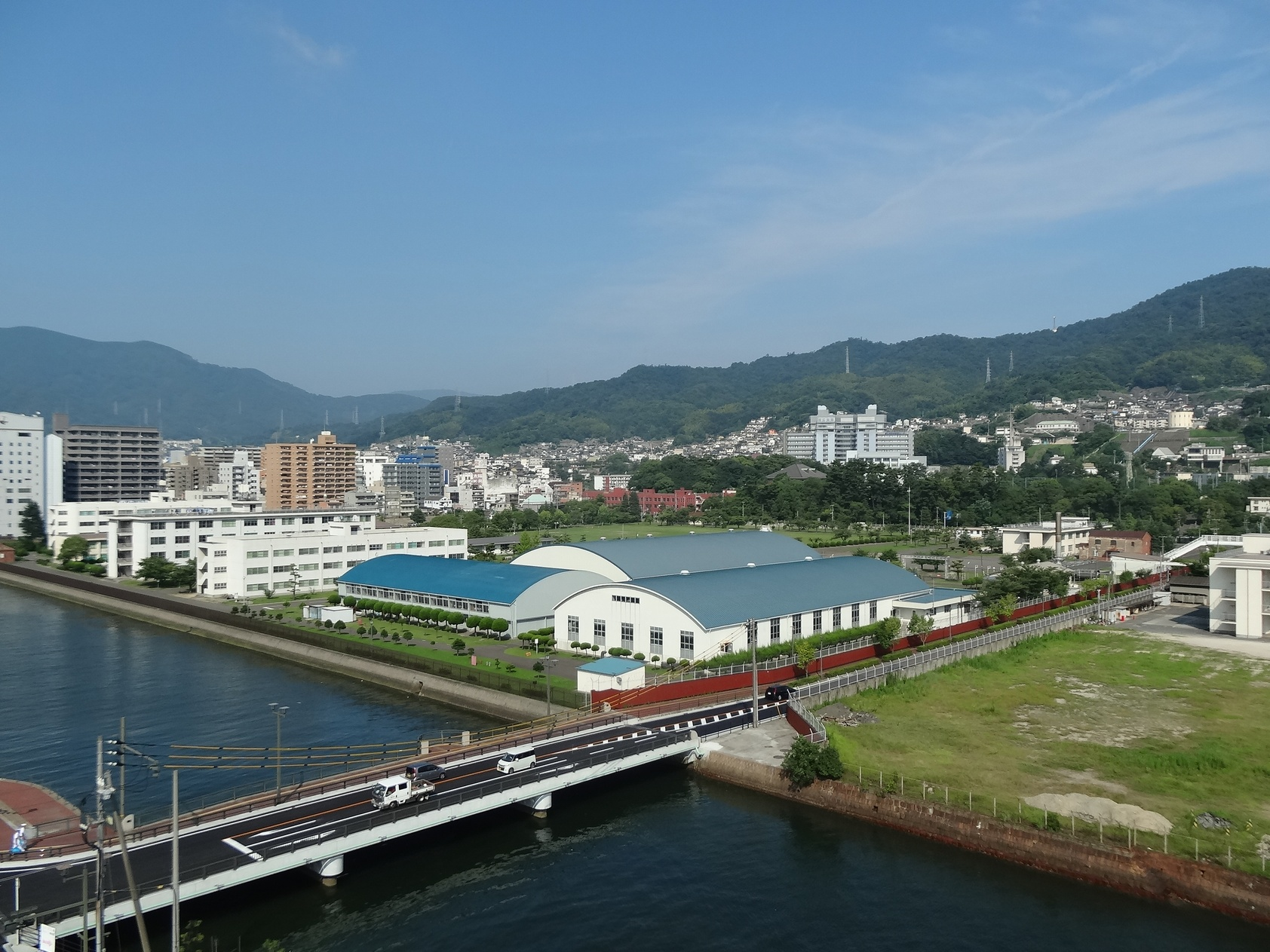
Kure Recruit Training Center

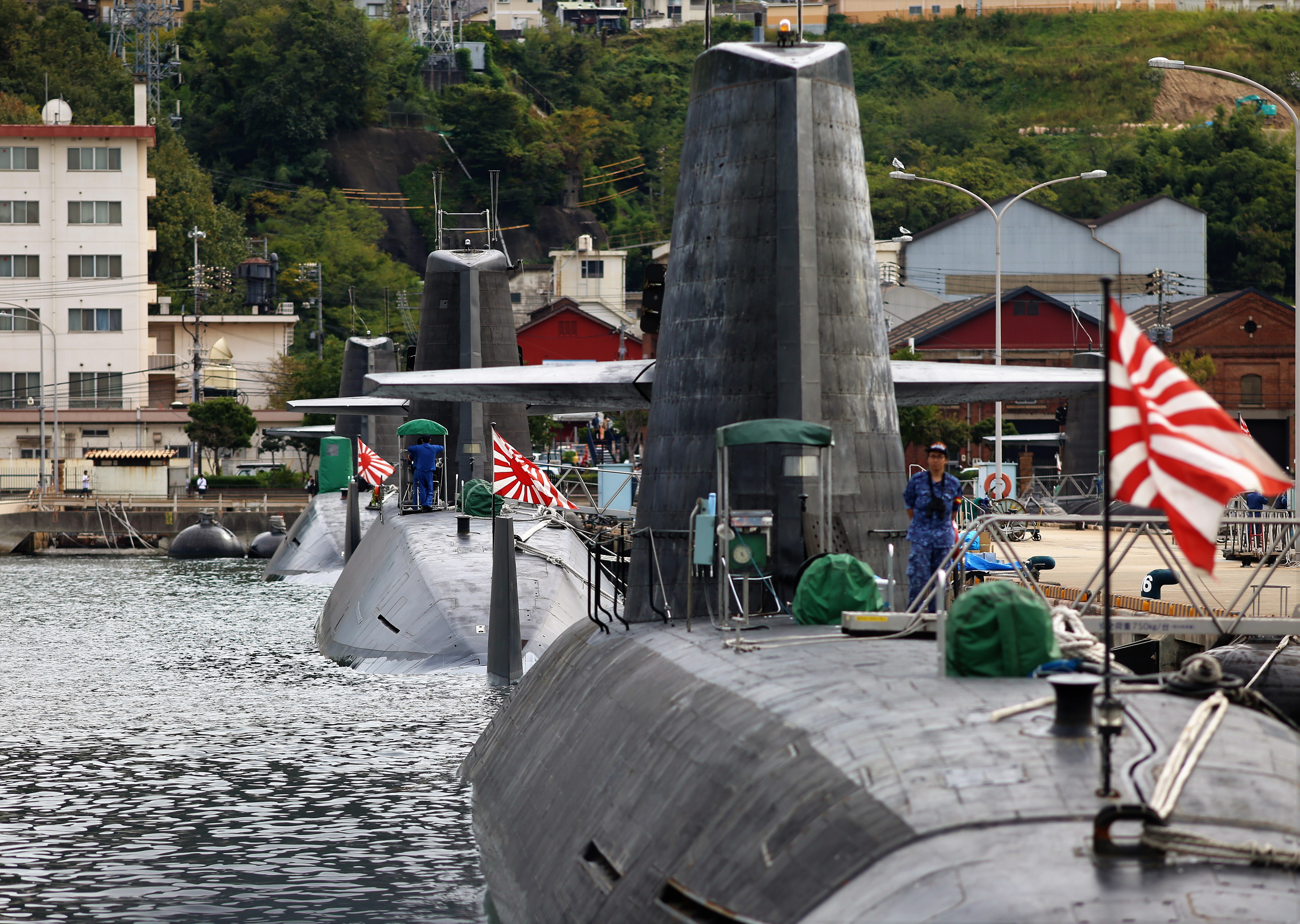
Sōryū-class submarine in Kure Naval Base

== See also ==
- JMSDF Ōminato Naval Base
- JMSDF Yokosuka Naval Base
- JMSDF Maizuru Naval Base
- JMSDF Sasebo Naval Base
