= List of active Japan Maritime Self-Defense Force ships =

JMSDF ensign of Japan.

List of active ships of the Japan Maritime Self-Defense Force is a list of ships in active service with the Japan Maritime Self-Defense Force.

The JMSDF is one of the world's largest navies, and the second largest navy in Asia in terms of fleet tonnage. As of 2025, the JMSDF operates a total of 155 vessels (including minor auxiliary vessels), including: two multi-role aircraft-carrying cruisers (or light aircraft carriers), two helicopter destroyers (or helicopter carriers), 36 destroyers, six frigates, six destroyer escorts (or frigates), 23 attack submarines, 19 mine countermeasure vessels, six patrol vessels, three landing ship tanks, seven training vessels, and a fleet of various auxiliary ships.

As of 2013, a procurement list, added to the current National Defense Program Guidelines (NDPG), has revealed that, among other things, an additional 48 escort vessels of various classes are planned to be added to the MSDF fleet in the 2020s. In addition, as of 7 July 2013, it was being reported that plans were under way to procure two more Aegis equipped destroyers in order to bolster ongoing BMD efforts, the first to be contracted for in fiscal year 2015 and the other in fiscal year 2016.

== Submarine fleet ==
=== Submarines ===
Class	In service	Picture	Type	Ship	No.	Comm.	Displacement	Notes
Submarines (23 in service)
Oyashio-class	6		Attack submarine (Diesel-electric)	JS Narushio	SS-595	2003	2,750 tonnes (surfaced); 4,000 tonnes (submerged)	2 of 11 built converted to training ships (see Training Vessels below), and 3 decommissioned.
Oyashio-class	6		Attack submarine (Diesel-electric)	JS Kuroshio	SS-596	2004	2,750 tonnes (surfaced); 4,000 tonnes (submerged)	2 of 11 built converted to training ships (see Training Vessels below), and 3 decommissioned.
Oyashio-class	6		Attack submarine (Diesel-electric)	JS Takashio	SS-597	2005	2,750 tonnes (surfaced); 4,000 tonnes (submerged)	2 of 11 built converted to training ships (see Training Vessels below), and 3 decommissioned.
Oyashio-class	6		Attack submarine (Diesel-electric)	JS Yaeshio	SS-598	2006	2,750 tonnes (surfaced); 4,000 tonnes (submerged)	2 of 11 built converted to training ships (see Training Vessels below), and 3 decommissioned.
Oyashio-class	6		Attack submarine (Diesel-electric)	JS Setoshio	SS-599	2007	2,750 tonnes (surfaced); 4,000 tonnes (submerged)	2 of 11 built converted to training ships (see Training Vessels below), and 3 decommissioned.
Oyashio-class	6		Attack submarine (Diesel-electric)	JS Mochishio	SS-600	2008	2,750 tonnes (surfaced); 4,000 tonnes (submerged)	2 of 11 built converted to training ships (see Training Vessels below), and 3 decommissioned.
Sōryū-class	10		Attack submarine (AIP sterling engine + lead-acid batteries)	JS Sōryū	SS-501	2009	2,900 tonnes (surfaced); 4,200 tonnes (submerged)	
Sōryū-class	10		Attack submarine (AIP sterling engine + lead-acid batteries)	JS Unryū	SS-502	2010	2,900 tonnes (surfaced); 4,200 tonnes (submerged)	
Sōryū-class	10		Attack submarine (AIP sterling engine + lead-acid batteries)	JS Hakuryū	SS-503	2011	2,900 tonnes (surfaced); 4,200 tonnes (submerged)	
Sōryū-class	10		Attack submarine (AIP sterling engine + lead-acid batteries)	JS Kenryū	SS-504	2012	2,900 tonnes (surfaced); 4,200 tonnes (submerged)	
Sōryū-class	10		Attack submarine (AIP sterling engine + lead-acid batteries)	JS Zuiryū	SS-505	2013	2,900 tonnes (surfaced); 4,200 tonnes (submerged)	
Sōryū-class	10		Attack submarine (AIP sterling engine + lead-acid batteries)	JS Kokuryū	SS-506	2015	2,900 tonnes (surfaced); 4,200 tonnes (submerged)	
Sōryū-class	10		Attack submarine (AIP sterling engine + lead-acid batteries)	JS Jinryū	SS-507	2016	2,900 tonnes (surfaced); 4,200 tonnes (submerged)	
Sōryū-class	10		Attack submarine (AIP sterling engine + lead-acid batteries)	JS Sekiryū	SS-508	2017	2,900 tonnes (surfaced); 4,200 tonnes (submerged)	
Sōryū-class	10		Attack submarine (AIP sterling engine + lead-acid batteries)	JS Seiryū	SS-509	2018	2,900 tonnes (surfaced); 4,200 tonnes (submerged)	
Sōryū-class	10		Attack submarine (AIP sterling engine + lead-acid batteries)	JS Shōryū	SS-510	2019	2,900 tonnes (surfaced); 4,200 tonnes (submerged)	
Sōryū-class	2		Attack submarine (AIP lithium-ion batteries)	JS Ōryū	SS-511	2020	2,900 tonnes (surfaced); 4,200 tonnes (submerged)	The JS Ōryū is the world's first submarine powered by lithium-ion batteries.
Sōryū-class	2		Attack submarine (AIP lithium-ion batteries)	JS Tōryū	SS-512	2021	2,900 tonnes (surfaced); 4,200 tonnes (submerged)	The JS Ōryū is the world's first submarine powered by lithium-ion batteries.
Taigei-class	5 (+3 being built)		Attack submarine (AIP lithium ion)	JS Taigei	SS-513	2022	3,000 tonnes (surfaced)	Total planned of 10.
Taigei-class	5 (+3 being built)		Attack submarine (AIP lithium ion)	JS Hakugei	SS-514	2023	3,000 tonnes (surfaced)	Total planned of 10.
Taigei-class	5 (+3 being built)		Attack submarine (AIP lithium ion)	JS Jingei	SS-515	2024	3,000 tonnes (surfaced)	Total planned of 10.
Taigei-class	5 (+3 being built)		Attack submarine (AIP lithium ion)	JS Raigei	SS-516	2025	3,000 tonnes (surfaced)	Total planned of 10.
Taigei-class	5 (+3 being built)		Attack submarine (AIP lithium ion)	JS Chogei	SS-517	2026	3,000 tonnes (surfaced)	Total planned of 10.

== Surface fleet ==
=== Multi-role aircraft-carrying cruiser (de facto light aircraft carrier) - CVM ===
Officially classed as “aircraft-carrying multi-role cruiser” the class is being converted to function as light aircraft carriers.

Class	In service	Picture	Type	Ship	No.	Comm.	Displacement	Notes
CVM - Multi-role aircraft-carrying cruiser (light aircraft carrier; 2 in service)
Izumo-class	2		CVM (multi-role aircraft-carrying cruiser)	JS Izumo	CVM-183	2015	27,000 tonnes	Converting into light aircraft carrier configuration to carry F-35B V/STOL fighters from the mid-2020s.
Izumo-class	2		CVM (multi-role aircraft-carrying cruiser)	JS Kaga	CVM-184	2017	27,000 tonnes	Converting into light aircraft carrier configuration to carry F-35B V/STOL fighters from the mid-2020s.

=== Helicopter destroyers (de facto helicopter carrier) - DDH ===
Officially classed as "helicopter destroyers", these vessels have a full-length flight deck helicopter carrier configuration.

Class	In service	Picture	Type	Ship	No.	Comm.	Displacement	Notes
DDH – Helicopter-carrying destroyers (2 in service)
Hyūga-class	2		DDH (de facto helicopter carrier)	JS Hyūga	DDH-181	2009	19,000 tonnes	
Hyūga-class	2		DDH (de facto helicopter carrier)	JS Ise	DDH-182	2011	19,000 tonnes	

=== Landing ships ===
Class	In service	Picture	Type	Ship	No.	Comm.	Displacement	Notes
Landing ships - LST (3 in service)
Ōsumi-class	3		Landing ship tank (de facto Amphibious transport dock)	JS Ōsumi	LST 4001	1998	14,000 tonnes	Class upgraded to land Boeing MV-22s and carry the AAV7A1 Amphibious Assault Vehicles.
Ōsumi-class	3		Landing ship tank (de facto Amphibious transport dock)	JS Shimokita	LST 4002	2002	14,000 tonnes	Class upgraded to land Boeing MV-22s and carry the AAV7A1 Amphibious Assault Vehicles.
Ōsumi-class	3		Landing ship tank (de facto Amphibious transport dock)	JS Kunisaki	LST 4003	2003	14,000 tonnes	Class upgraded to land Boeing MV-22s and carry the AAV7A1 Amphibious Assault Vehicles.
Landing craft (15 in service)
1-Go-class	6		LCAC (air-cushioned landing craft)	—	LCAC-2101	1997	182 tonnes	2 carried with each Ōsumi-class ships
1-Go-class	6		LCAC (air-cushioned landing craft)	—	LCAC-2102	1997	182 tonnes	2 carried with each Ōsumi-class ships
1-Go-class	6		LCAC (air-cushioned landing craft)	—	LCAC-2103	2001	182 tonnes	2 carried with each Ōsumi-class ships
1-Go-class	6		LCAC (air-cushioned landing craft)	—	LCAC-2104	2001	182 tonnes	2 carried with each Ōsumi-class ships
1-Go-class	6		LCAC (air-cushioned landing craft)	—	LCAC-2105	2002	182 tonnes	2 carried with each Ōsumi-class ships
1-Go-class	6		LCAC (air-cushioned landing craft)	—	LCAC-2106	2002	182 tonnes	2 carried with each Ōsumi-class ships
YL-09-class	7		LCM (Landing craft mechanized)	—	YL-12	—	50 tonnes	
YL-09-class	7		LCM (Landing craft mechanized)	—	YL-13	—	50 tonnes	
YL-09-class	7		LCM (Landing craft mechanized)	—	YL-14	—	50 tonnes	
YL-09-class	7		LCM (Landing craft mechanized)	—	YL-15	—	50 tonnes	
YL-09-class	7		LCM (Landing craft mechanized)	—	YL-16	—	50 tonnes	
YL-09-class	7		LCM (Landing craft mechanized)	—	YL-17	—	50 tonnes	
YL-09-class	7		LCM (Landing craft mechanized)	—	YL-18	—	50 tonnes	
LCU-2001-class	1		LCU (Landing craft utility)	JS LC-02	LCU-2002	1992	50 tonnes	JS LC-01 decommissioned in 2022
YL-119-class	1		LCL (Landing craft lighters)	—	YL-119	—	200 tonnes	

=== Destroyers - DDG/DD ===
The JMSDF uses the official term Destroyers despite some larger ships (Aegis equipped destroyers) being analogous to cruisers and smaller vessels being analogous to frigates by most international classifications. Japan's large Aegis destroyers are equipped with 90-cell or 96-cell VLS and other destroyers are equipped with 32-cell VLS. The older Asagiri-class destroyers do not feature any VLS.

Class	In service	Picture	Type	Ship	No.	Comm.	Displacement	Notes
Aegis equipped destroyers - DDG (8 in service)
Kongō-class	4		DDG (Aegis)	JS Kongō	DDG-173	1993	9,500 tonnes	
Kongō-class	4		DDG (Aegis)	JS Kirishima	DDG-174	1995	9,500 tonnes	
Kongō-class	4		DDG (Aegis)	JS Myōkō	DDG-175	1996	9,500 tonnes	
Kongō-class	4		DDG (Aegis)	JS Chōkai	DDG-176	1998	9,500 tonnes	
Atago-class	2		DDG (Aegis)	JS Atago	DDG-177	2007	10,000 tonnes	
Atago-class	2		DDG (Aegis)	JS Ashigara	DDG-178	2008	10,000 tonnes	
Maya-class	2		DDG (Aegis)	JS Maya	DDG-179	2020	10,500 tonnes	
Maya-class	2		DDG (Aegis)	JS Haguro	DDG-180	2021	10,500 tonnes	
Destroyers - DD (26 in service)
Asagiri-class	6		DD	JS Yūgiri	DD-153	1989	5,200 tonnes	Being replaced by the Mogami-class frigates. Yamagiri (DD-152) has since been reclassified as a training vessel.
Asagiri-class	6		DD	JS Amagiri	DD-154	1989	5,200 tonnes	Being replaced by the Mogami-class frigates. Yamagiri (DD-152) has since been reclassified as a training vessel.
Asagiri-class	6		DD	JS Hamagiri	DD-155	1990	5,200 tonnes	Being replaced by the Mogami-class frigates. Yamagiri (DD-152) has since been reclassified as a training vessel.
Asagiri-class	6		DD	JS Setogiri	DD-156	1990	5,200 tonnes	Being replaced by the Mogami-class frigates. Yamagiri (DD-152) has since been reclassified as a training vessel.
Asagiri-class	6		DD	JS Sawagiri	DD-157	1990	5,200 tonnes	Being replaced by the Mogami-class frigates. Yamagiri (DD-152) has since been reclassified as a training vessel.
Asagiri-class	6		DD	JS Umigiri	DD-158	1991	5,200 tonnes	Being replaced by the Mogami-class frigates. Yamagiri (DD-152) has since been reclassified as a training vessel.
Murasame-class	9		DD	JS Murasame	DD-101	1996	6,200 tonnes	
Murasame-class	9		DD	JS Harusame	DD-102	1997	6,200 tonnes	
Murasame-class	9		DD	JS Yūdachi	DD-103	1999	6,200 tonnes	
Murasame-class	9		DD	JS Kirisame	DD-104	1999	6,200 tonnes	
Murasame-class	9		DD	JS Inazuma	DD-105	2000	6,200 tonnes	
Murasame-class	9		DD	JS Samidare	DD-106	2000	6,200 tonnes	
Murasame-class	9		DD	JS Ikazuchi	DD-107	2001	6,200 tonnes	
Murasame-class	9		DD	JS Akebono	DD-108	2002	6,200 tonnes	
Murasame-class	9		DD	JS Ariake	DD-109	2002	6,200 tonnes	
Takanami-class	5		DD	JS Takanami	DD-110	2003	6,400 tonnes	
Takanami-class	5		DD	JS Onami	DD-111	2003	6,400 tonnes	
Takanami-class	5		DD	JS Makinami	DD-112	2004	6,400 tonnes	
Takanami-class	5		DD	JS Sazanami	DD-113	2005	6,400 tonnes	
Takanami-class	5		DD	JS Suzunami	DD-114	2006	6,400 tonnes	
Akizuki-class	4		DD	JS Akizuki	DD-115	2012	6,800 tonnes	
Akizuki-class	4		DD	JS Teruzuki	DD-116	2013	6,800 tonnes	
Akizuki-class	4		DD	JS Suzutsuki	DD-117	2014	6,800 tonnes	
Akizuki-class	4		DD	JS Fuyuzuki	DD-118	2014	6,800 tonnes	
Asahi-class	2		DD	JS Asahi	DD-119	2018	6,800 tonnes	
Asahi-class	2		DD	JS Shiranui	DD-120	2019	6,800 tonnes	

=== Frigate Multi-Purpose/Mine - FFM ===
Japanese frigates are designed to equipped with 16-cell VLS.

Class	In service	Picture	Type	Ship	No.	Comm.	Displacement	Notes
Frigate Multi-Purpose/Mine - FFM (10 in Service)
Mogami-class	10 (+2 ordered)		Frigate	JS Mogami	FFM-1	2022	5,500 tonnes	Successor of the Asagiri-class and Abukuma-class Designed for anti-submarine, anti-surface, and anti-air warfare, as well as surveillance and minesweeping JS Nagara commissioned in June 2026. Twelve instead of 22 are planned in total. A new design should make up the 12 other ships.
Mogami-class	10 (+2 ordered)		Frigate	JS Kumano	FFM-2	2022	5,500 tonnes	Successor of the Asagiri-class and Abukuma-class Designed for anti-submarine, anti-surface, and anti-air warfare, as well as surveillance and minesweeping JS Nagara commissioned in June 2026. Twelve instead of 22 are planned in total. A new design should make up the 12 other ships.
Mogami-class	10 (+2 ordered)		Frigate	JS Noshiro	FFM-3	2022	5,500 tonnes	Successor of the Asagiri-class and Abukuma-class Designed for anti-submarine, anti-surface, and anti-air warfare, as well as surveillance and minesweeping JS Nagara commissioned in June 2026. Twelve instead of 22 are planned in total. A new design should make up the 12 other ships.
Mogami-class	10 (+2 ordered)		Frigate	JS Mikuma	FFM-4	2023	5,500 tonnes	Successor of the Asagiri-class and Abukuma-class Designed for anti-submarine, anti-surface, and anti-air warfare, as well as surveillance and minesweeping JS Nagara commissioned in June 2026. Twelve instead of 22 are planned in total. A new design should make up the 12 other ships.
Mogami-class	10 (+2 ordered)		Frigate	JS Yahagi	FFM-5	2024	5,500 tonnes	Successor of the Asagiri-class and Abukuma-class Designed for anti-submarine, anti-surface, and anti-air warfare, as well as surveillance and minesweeping JS Nagara commissioned in June 2026. Twelve instead of 22 are planned in total. A new design should make up the 12 other ships.
Mogami-class	10 (+2 ordered)		Frigate	JS Agano	FFM-6	2024	5,500 tonnes	Successor of the Asagiri-class and Abukuma-class Designed for anti-submarine, anti-surface, and anti-air warfare, as well as surveillance and minesweeping JS Nagara commissioned in June 2026. Twelve instead of 22 are planned in total. A new design should make up the 12 other ships.
Mogami-class	10 (+2 ordered)		Frigate	JS Niyodo	FFM-7	2025	5,500 tonnes	Successor of the Asagiri-class and Abukuma-class Designed for anti-submarine, anti-surface, and anti-air warfare, as well as surveillance and minesweeping JS Nagara commissioned in June 2026. Twelve instead of 22 are planned in total. A new design should make up the 12 other ships.
Mogami-class	10 (+2 ordered)		Frigate	JS Yūbetsu	FFM-8	2025	5,500 tonnes	Successor of the Asagiri-class and Abukuma-class Designed for anti-submarine, anti-surface, and anti-air warfare, as well as surveillance and minesweeping JS Nagara commissioned in June 2026. Twelve instead of 22 are planned in total. A new design should make up the 12 other ships.
Mogami-class	10 (+2 ordered)		Frigate	JS Natori	FFM-9	2026	5,500 tonnes	Successor of the Asagiri-class and Abukuma-class Designed for anti-submarine, anti-surface, and anti-air warfare, as well as surveillance and minesweeping JS Nagara commissioned in June 2026. Twelve instead of 22 are planned in total. A new design should make up the 12 other ships.
Mogami-class	10 (+2 ordered)		Frigate	JS Nagara	FFM-10	2026	5,500 tonnes	Successor of the Asagiri-class and Abukuma-class Designed for anti-submarine, anti-surface, and anti-air warfare, as well as surveillance and minesweeping JS Nagara commissioned in June 2026. Twelve instead of 22 are planned in total. A new design should make up the 12 other ships.

=== Destroyer escorts - DE ===
These vessels are analogous to frigates. The vessels do not feature any VLS.

Class	In service	Picture	Type	Ship	No.	Comm.	Displacement	Notes
Destroyer escorts - DE (6 in service)
Abukuma-class	6		Destroyer escort (or frigate)	JS Abukuma	DE-229	1989	2,550 tonnes	To be replaced by the Mogami-class To be retired and transferred to the Philippines starting in 2027.
Abukuma-class	6		Destroyer escort (or frigate)	JS Jintsū	DE-230	1990	2,550 tonnes	To be replaced by the Mogami-class To be retired and transferred to the Philippines starting in 2027.
Abukuma-class	6		Destroyer escort (or frigate)	JS Ōyodo	DE-231	1991	2,550 tonnes	To be replaced by the Mogami-class To be retired and transferred to the Philippines starting in 2027.
Abukuma-class	6		Destroyer escort (or frigate)	JS Sendai	DE-232	1991	2,550 tonnes	To be replaced by the Mogami-class To be retired and transferred to the Philippines starting in 2027.
Abukuma-class	6		Destroyer escort (or frigate)	JS Chikuma	DE-233	1993	2,550 tonnes	To be replaced by the Mogami-class To be retired and transferred to the Philippines starting in 2027.
Abukuma-class	6		Destroyer escort (or frigate)	JS Tone	DE-234	1993	2,550 tonnes	To be replaced by the Mogami-class To be retired and transferred to the Philippines starting in 2027.

=== Mine countermeasure vessels ===
Class	In service	Picture	Type	Ship	No.	Comm.	Displacement	Notes
Mine countermeasure vessels (19 in service)
Uraga-class	2		Mine countermeasure support ship	JS Uraga	MST-463	1997	6,850 tonnes	
Uraga-class	2		Mine countermeasure support ship	JS Bungo	MST-464	1998	6,850 tonnes	
Sugashima-class	6		Mine Sweeper Coastal					
Sugashima-class	6		Mine Sweeper Coastal	JS Izushima	MSC-687	2003	650 tonnes	wooden ship, five decommissioned (one after collision, 2019) & one sunk after fire, 2024
Sugashima-class	6		Mine Sweeper Coastal	JS Aishima	MSC-688	2004	650 tonnes	wooden ship, five decommissioned (one after collision, 2019) & one sunk after fire, 2024
Sugashima-class	6		Mine Sweeper Coastal	JS Aoshima	MSC-689	2005	650 tonnes	wooden ship, five decommissioned (one after collision, 2019) & one sunk after fire, 2024
Sugashima-class	6		Mine Sweeper Coastal	JS Miyajima	MSC-690	2005	650 tonnes	wooden ship, five decommissioned (one after collision, 2019) & one sunk after fire, 2024
Sugashima-class	6		Mine Sweeper Coastal	JS Shishijima	MSC-691	2006	650 tonnes	wooden ship, five decommissioned (one after collision, 2019) & one sunk after fire, 2024
Sugashima-class	6		Mine Sweeper Coastal	JS Kuroshima	MSC-692	2007	650 tonnes	wooden ship, five decommissioned (one after collision, 2019) & one sunk after fire, 2024
Hirashima-class	3		Mine Sweeper Coastal	JS Hirashima	MSC-601	2008	650 tonnes	wooden ship
Hirashima-class	3		Mine Sweeper Coastal	JS Yakushima	MSC-602	2009	650 tonnes	wooden ship
Hirashima-class	3		Mine Sweeper Coastal	JS Takashima	MSC-603	2010	650 tonnes	wooden ship
Enoshima-class	3		Mine Sweeper Coastal	JS Enoshima	MSC-604	2012	650 tonnes	FRP ship Only “Hatsushima” is equipped with a remote-controlled turret type machine gun
Enoshima-class	3		Mine Sweeper Coastal	JS Chichijima	MSC-605	2013	650 tonnes	FRP ship Only “Hatsushima” is equipped with a remote-controlled turret type machine gun
Enoshima-class	3		Mine Sweeper Coastal	JS Hatsushima	MSC-606	2015	650 tonnes	FRP ship Only “Hatsushima” is equipped with a remote-controlled turret type machine gun
Awaji-class	4		Mine Sweeper Ocean	JS Awaji	MSO-304	2017	690 tonnes	FRP ship
Awaji-class	4		Mine Sweeper Ocean	JS Hirado	MSO-305	2018	690 tonnes	FRP ship
Awaji-class	4		Mine Sweeper Ocean	JS Etajima	MSO-306	2021	690 tonnes	FRP ship
Awaji-class	4		Mine Sweeper Ocean	JS Nōmi	MSO-307	2025	690 tonnes	FRP ship

=== Patrol vessels ===
Class	In service	Picture	Type	Ship	No.	Comm.	Displacement	Notes
Patrol vessels (6 in service)
Hayabusa-class	6		Guided-Missile Patrol Boat	JS Hayabusa	PG-824	2002	240 tonnes	
Hayabusa-class	6		Guided-Missile Patrol Boat	JS Wakataka	PG-825	2002	240 tonnes	
Hayabusa-class	6		Guided-Missile Patrol Boat	JS Otaka	PG-826	2003	240 tonnes	
Hayabusa-class	6		Guided-Missile Patrol Boat	JS Kumataka	PG-827	2003	240 tonnes	
Hayabusa-class	6		Guided-Missile Patrol Boat	JS Umitaka	PG-828	2004	240 tonnes	
Hayabusa-class	6		Guided-Missile Patrol Boat	JS Shirataka	PG-829	2004	240 tonnes	

=== Surveillance ships ===
Class	In service	Picture	Type	Ship	No.	Comm.	Displacement	Notes
Surveillance ships (4 in service)
Hibiki-class	4		Ocean surveillance ship	JS Hibiki	AOS-5201	1991	2,896 – 3,861 tonnes	Equipped with a AN/UQQ-2 Surveillance Towed Array Sensor System
Hibiki-class	4		Ocean surveillance ship	JS Harima	AOS-5202	1992	2,896 – 3,861 tonnes	Equipped with a AN/UQQ-2 Surveillance Towed Array Sensor System
Hibiki-class	4		Ocean surveillance ship	JS Aki	AOS-5203	2021	2,896 – 3,861 tonnes	Equipped with a AN/UQQ-2 Surveillance Towed Array Sensor System
Hibiki-class	4		Ocean surveillance ship	JS Bingo	AOS-5204	2026	2,896 – 3,861 tonnes	Equipped with a AN/UQQ-2 Surveillance Towed Array Sensor System

=== Training vessels ===
Class	In service	Picture	Type	Ship	No.	Comm.	Displacement	Notes
Training submarine (2 in service)
Oyashio-class	2		Training attack submarine (Diesel-electric)	JS Makishio	TSS-3610 (former SS-593)	Commissioned in 2001, converted in 2023	2,750 tonnes (surfaced); 4,000 tonnes (submerged)	
Oyashio-class	2		Training attack submarine (Diesel-electric)	JS Isoshio	TSS-3611 (former SS-594)	Commissioned in 2002, converted in 2025	2,750 tonnes (surfaced); 4,000 tonnes (submerged)	
Training surface vessels (3 in service)
Kashima-class	1		Cadet training ship	JS Kashima	TV-3508	1995	5,400 tonnes	
Hatakaze-class	1		Training guided-missile destroyers	JS Shimakaze	TV-3521 (former DDG-172)	Commissioned in 1988, converted in 2021	6,100 tonnes	Converted Hatakaze-class guided missile destroyer
Asagiri-class	1		Training destroyers	JS Yamagiri	TV-3515 (former DD-152)	Commissioned in 1989, converted in 2025 (Second change)	4,900 tonnes	Converted Asagiri-class destroyer

== Auxiliary fleet ==
=== Logistics ===
Class	In service	Picture	Type	Ship	No.	Comm.	Displacement	Notes
Replenishment ships (5 in service)
Towada-class	3		Replenishment oiler	JS Towada	AOE-422	1987	15,000 tonnes	
Towada-class	3		Replenishment oiler	JS Tokiwa	AOE-423	1990	15,000 tonnes	
Towada-class	3		Replenishment oiler	JS Hamana	AOE-424	1990	15,000 tonnes	
Mashū-class	2		Replenishment oiler	JS Mashū	AOE-425	2006	25,000 tonnes	
Mashū-class	2		Replenishment oiler	JS Ōmi	AOE-426	2006	25,000 tonnes	
Oil tankers (2 in service)
YOT-01-class	2		Yard oiler tanker	—	YOT-01	2022	6,000 tonnes	
YOT-01-class	2		Yard oiler tanker	—	YOT-02	2022	6,000 tonnes	

=== Miscellaneous ===
Class	In service	Picture	Type	Ship	No.	Comm.	Displacement	Notes
Experimental ships (1 in service)
Asuka-class	1		Experiment ship	JS Asuka	ASE-6102	1995	6,300 tonnes	Performance confirmation tests for integrated navigation systems.
Training support ships (2 in service)
Kurobe-class	1		Training support ship	JS Kurobe	ATS-4202	1989	2,590 tonnes	
Tenryū-class	1		Training support ship	JS Tenryū	ATS-4203	2000	2,790 tonnes	
Rescue vessels (2 in service)
Chihaya-class	1		Submarine rescue vessel	JS Chihaya	ASR-403	2000	7,000 tonnes	
Chiyoda-class	1		Submarine rescue vessel	JS Chiyoda	ASR-404	2018	7,200 tonnes	JMSDF commissions new submarine rescue ship
Disaster relief (1 in service)
Hashidate-class	1		Accommodation ship	JS Hashidate	AYS-91	1999	490 tonnes	Participates in disaster relief
Diving support vessels (6 in service)
YDT-01-class	6		Diving support vessel	—	YDT-01	2000	260 tonnes	Used for EOD missions.
YDT-01-class	6		Diving support vessel	—	YDT-02	2000	260 tonnes	Used for EOD missions.
YDT-01-class	6		Diving support vessel	—	YDT-03	2001	260 tonnes	Used for EOD missions.
YDT-01-class	6		Diving support vessel	—	YDT-04	2001	260 tonnes	Used for EOD missions.
YDT-01-class	6		Diving support vessel	—	YDT-05	2003	260 tonnes	Used for EOD missions.
YDT-01-class	6		Diving support vessel	—	YDT-06	2003	260 tonnes	Used for EOD missions.
Cable laying ship (1 in service)
Muroto-class	1		Cable laying ship	JS Muroto	ARC-483	2013	6,500 tonnes	
Icebreaker (1 in service)
Shirase-class (2008)	1		Icebreaker	JS Shirase	AGB-5003	2009	20,000 tonnes	
Research ships (3 in service)
Nichinan-class	1		Oceanographic research ship	JS Nichinan	AGS-5105	1999	4,500 tonnes	
Shōnan-class	1		Oceanographic research ship	JS Shōnan	AGS-5106	2010	4,150 tonnes	
Akashi-class	1		Oceanographic research ship	JS Akashi	AGS-5107	2026	3,500 tonnes	
Multi-purpose support ships (5 in service)
Hiuchi-class	5		multi-purpose support ships	JS Hiuchi	AMS-4301	2002	1,000 tonnes	In addition to towing non-self-propelled vessels and target vessels, the program will support shooting and torpedo drills, firefighting, rescue operations, supply transport, disaster relief to remote islands, and offshore testing of new equipment.
Hiuchi-class	5		multi-purpose support ships	JS Suo	AMS-4302	2004	1,000 tonnes	In addition to towing non-self-propelled vessels and target vessels, the program will support shooting and torpedo drills, firefighting, rescue operations, supply transport, disaster relief to remote islands, and offshore testing of new equipment.
Hiuchi-class	5		multi-purpose support ships	JS Amakusa	AMS-4303	2004	1,000 tonnes	In addition to towing non-self-propelled vessels and target vessels, the program will support shooting and torpedo drills, firefighting, rescue operations, supply transport, disaster relief to remote islands, and offshore testing of new equipment.
Hiuchi-class	5		multi-purpose support ships	JS Genkai	AMS-4304	2008	1,000 tonnes	In addition to towing non-self-propelled vessels and target vessels, the program will support shooting and torpedo drills, firefighting, rescue operations, supply transport, disaster relief to remote islands, and offshore testing of new equipment.
Hiuchi-class	5		multi-purpose support ships	JS Enshu	AMS-4305	2008	1,000 tonnes	In addition to towing non-self-propelled vessels and target vessels, the program will support shooting and torpedo drills, firefighting, rescue operations, supply transport, disaster relief to remote islands, and offshore testing of new equipment.
Private Maritime Transport Services (2 in service) Not part of the JMSDF, under charter to the MoD
	1		Roll-on/roll-off	Hakuo		2014	17,345 tonnes	Contract renewed in FY2024

== Future JMSDF vessels ==
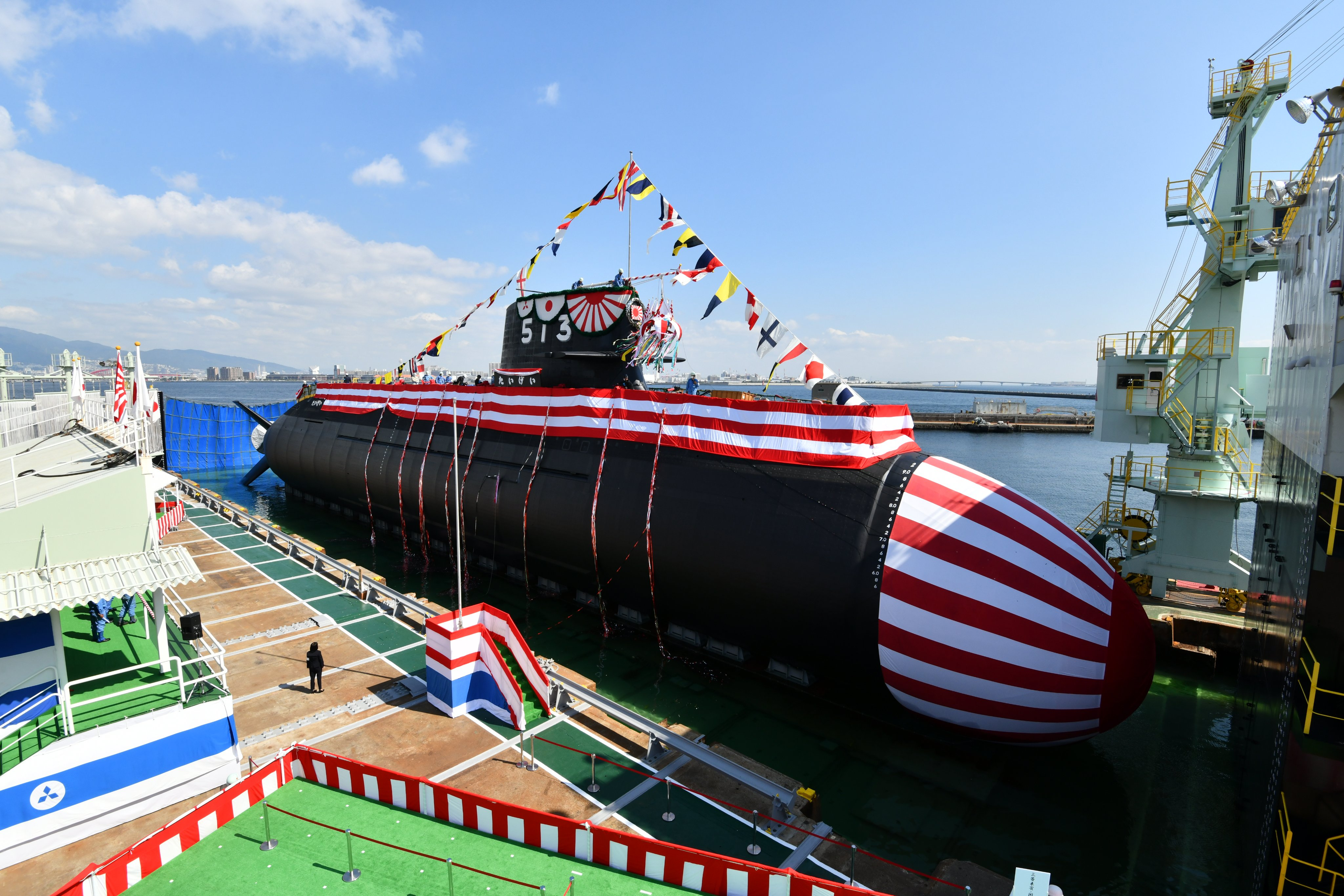
29SS-type submarine Taigei launch

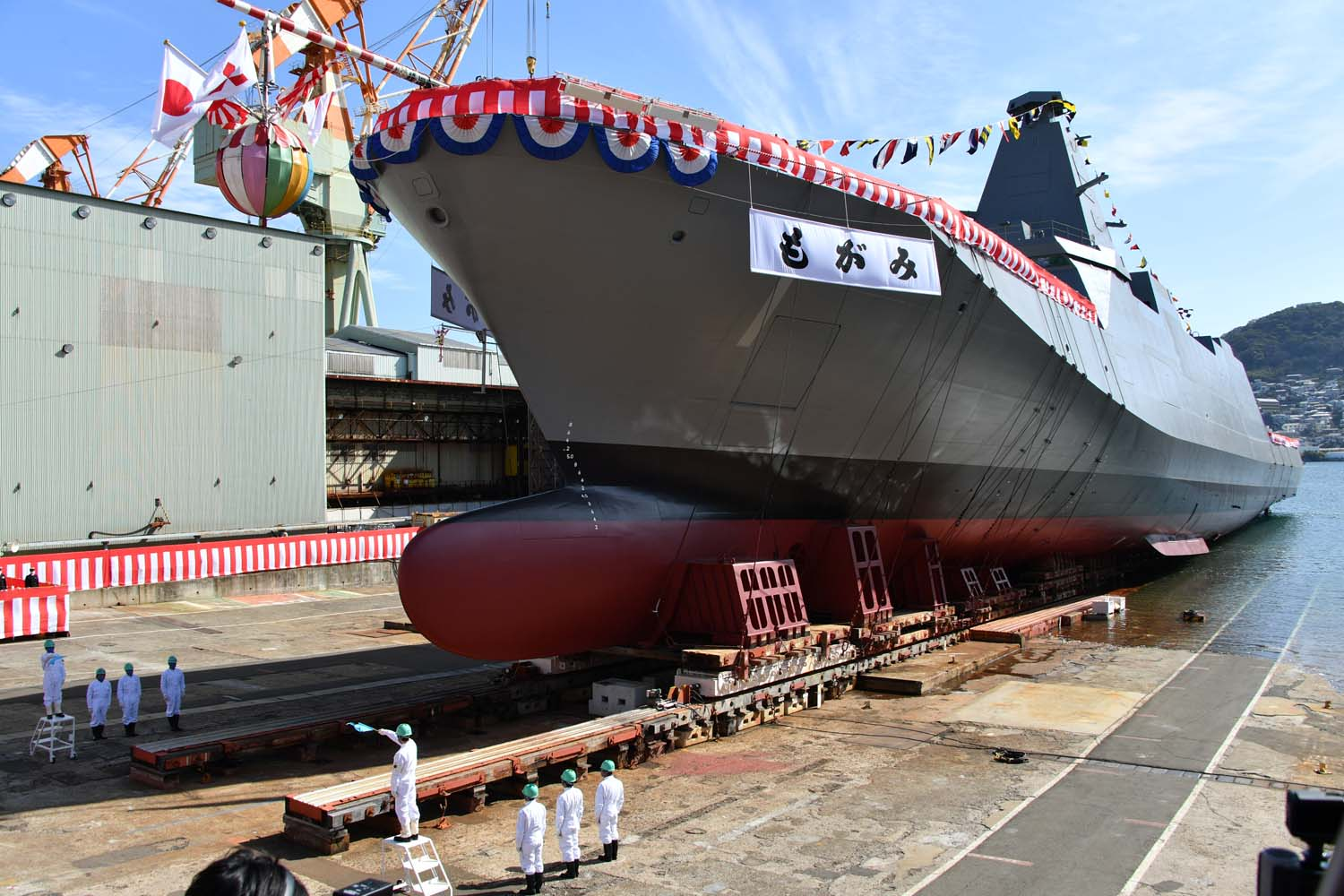
30DX-type frigate Mogami launch

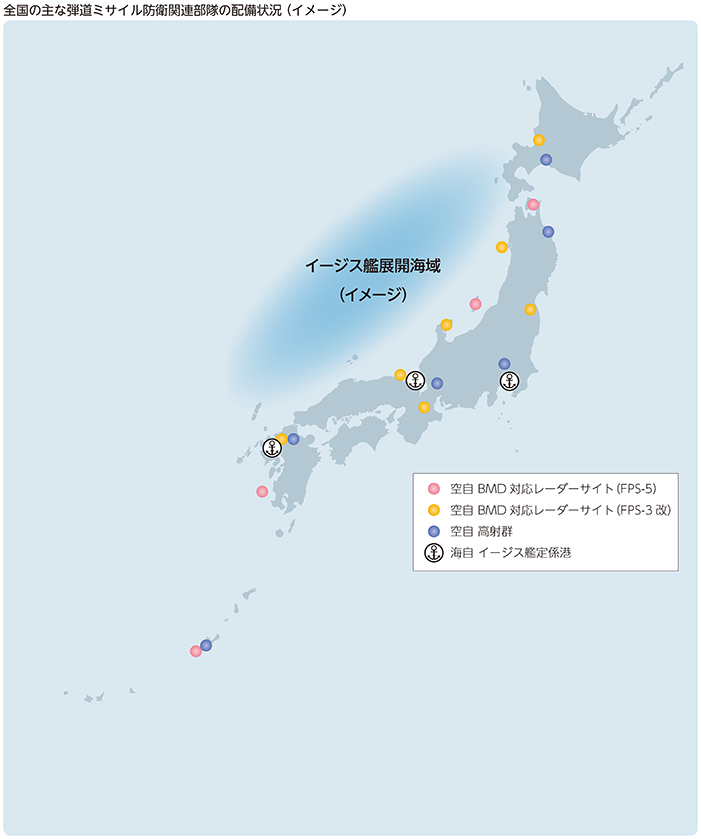
Japanese BMD map

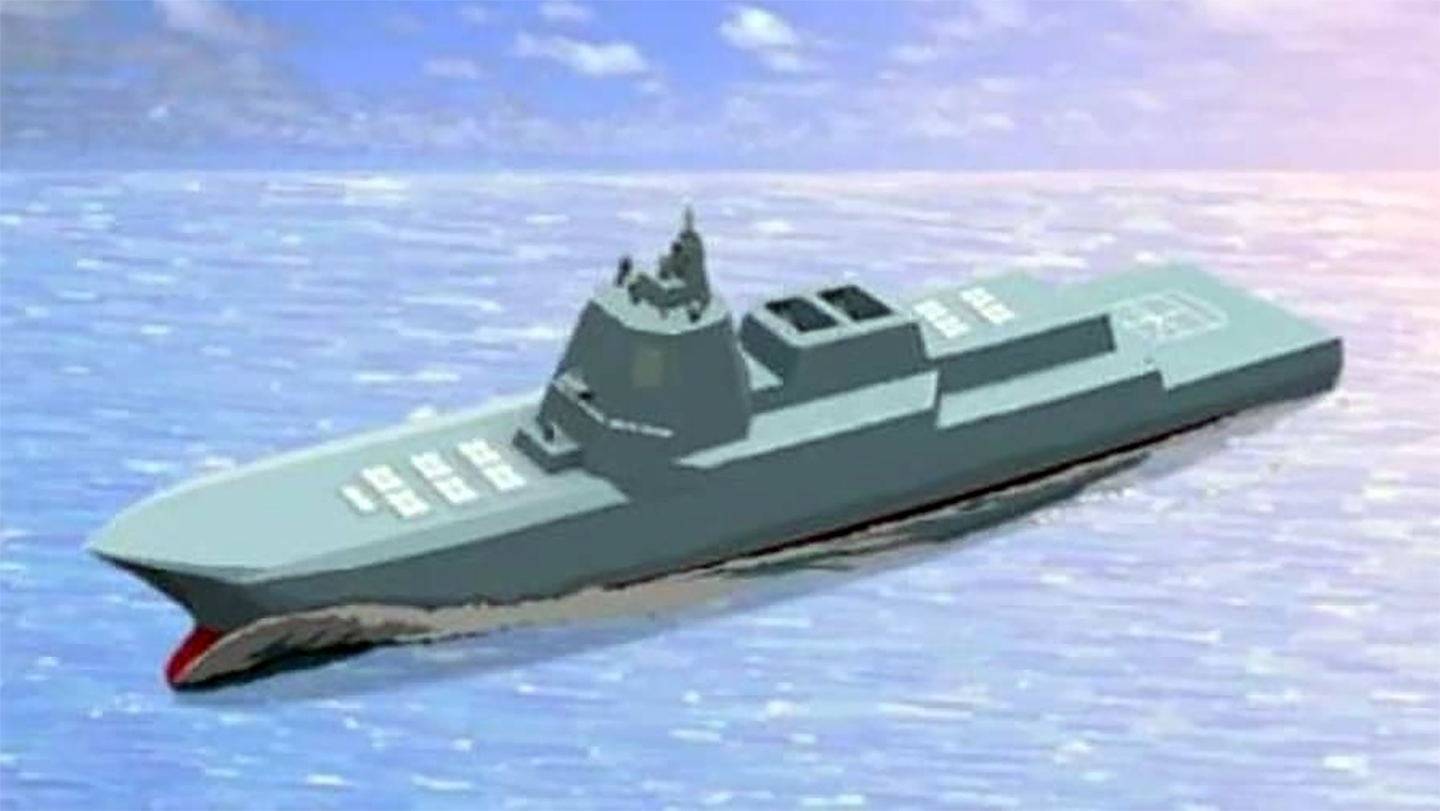
Aegis system equipped ships (ASEV)

=== Authorized projects ===
Authorized projects for the Japanese Maritime Self-Defense Force include the ongoing construction of an improved AIP-type non-nuclear attack submarine class, the recapitalization of the JMSDF's frigate fleet units, and the acquisition of a pair of JMSDF-owned oil tankers and up to four amphibious transports, as well as the pending construction of a dozen next-generation offshore patrol vessels (OPV) and two "Aegis system equipped ships" (ASEV) to provide dedicated sea-based ballistic missile defense (BMD) coverage of the Japanese home islands to replace the cancelled Aegis Ashore land-based BMD system.

==== 29SS submarines ====
This submarine class has a non-nuclear air-independent propulsion (AIP) propulsion plant using improved lithium-ion batteries for enhanced silencing and operational flexibility. These submarines will also have improved sonar and weapons systems. The lead ship Taigei will serve as a test bed for the rest of the class, allowing more rapid technical upgrades to the other submarines within this class.

==== Aegis system equipped ships (ASEV) ====
In 2020, Japanese Defense Minister Nobuo Kishi announced plans to build 2 new Aegis destroyers (pictured) to replace its scrapped land-based Aegis Ashore ballistic missile interceptors program. On August 31, 2022, the Japan Ministry of Defense announced that JMSDF will operate two "Aegis system equipped ships" (イージス・システム搭載艦 in Japanese) to replace its earlier cancellation of the Aegis Ashore program, commissioning one ship by the end of fiscal year 2027, and the other by the end of FY2028. The budget for design and other related expenses are to be submitted in the form of “item requests”, without specific amounts, and the initial procurement of the lead items are expected to clear legislation by FY2023. Construction is to begin in the following year of FY2024.

==== 13DDX Air Defence Destroyer ====
The Japanese Navy is designing a new generation of layered air-defence and information warfare destroyers. It will take concept elements from the Asahi-class (25DD) destroyer and the Mogami-class (30FFM) frigate. It is expected to be compact and stealthy as the 30FFM and as combat capable as the 25DD. It is planned for the early 2030s.

==== 30FFM frigates ====
In August 2017, the Acquisition, Technology & Logistics Agency (ATLA) selected Mitsubishi Heavy Industries (MHI) and Mitsui Engineering and Shipbuilding (MES) as the prime contractor and subcontractor to construct the frigate. In addition, the agency also selected a completely new design of the vessel (30DX). The new ship class is set to replace the Asagiri-class destroyers and Abukuma-class destroyer escorts.

==== Amphibious transport vessels ====
At a press conference held on February 16, 2021, Defense Minister Nobuo Kishi announced that the Japan Self-Defense Force (JSDF) established a joint amphibious unit equipped with three new transport ships by 2024. These units will consist of one medium-sized Logistics Support Vessels (LSV) capable of carrying about 1,700 long tons (1,700 t) of cargo and three smaller Landing Craft Utility (LCUs) vessels with each capable of carrying of cargo and350 long tons (360 t) operating in shallow waters. Although the Japan Maritime Self-Defense Force (JMSDF) has been basically responsible for the operation of the vessels, these vessels will be operated by a joint unit as the focus is on supporting the Japan Ground Self-Defense Force (JGSDF) and other forces operating in remote Southwest Islands, including Okinawa. The JSDF activated Japan's first marine unit since World War II on April 7, 2018, and the marines of the Amphibious Rapid Deployment Brigade (ARDB) are trained to counter invaders from occupying Japanese islands along the edge of the East China Sea.

==== Next-generation offshore patrol vessels (OPV) ====
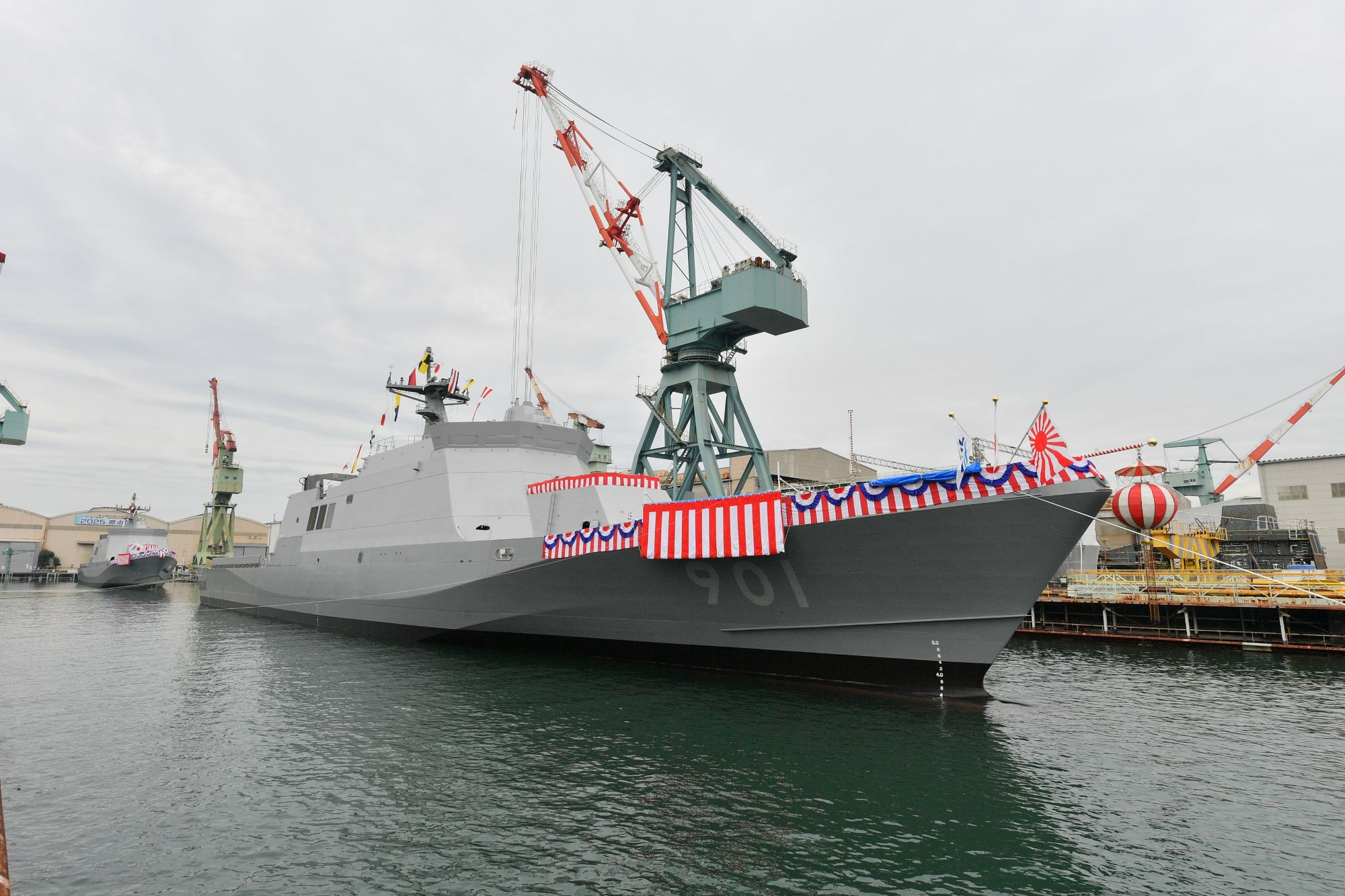
Sakura during her launch ceremony, 13 November 2025

On 30 June 2022, the Japan Ministry of Defense (MOD) announced the construction of 12 offshore patrol vessels (OPV) (pictured) for the Japanese Maritime Self-Defense Force (JMSDF) at a cost of ¥ 9 billion (US$66 million) per ship. Japan Marine United Corporation (JMU) is the prime contractor for this program with Mitsubishi Heavy Industries (MHI) chosen to be the subcontractor. Both JMU and MHI as well as Mitsui Engineering & Shipbuilding had submitted preliminary designs for the proposed next-generation OPVs. In 2025, the first of the OPVs were launched as the Sakura class, being scheduled to be commissioned in fiscal year 2027.

=== Proposed projects ===
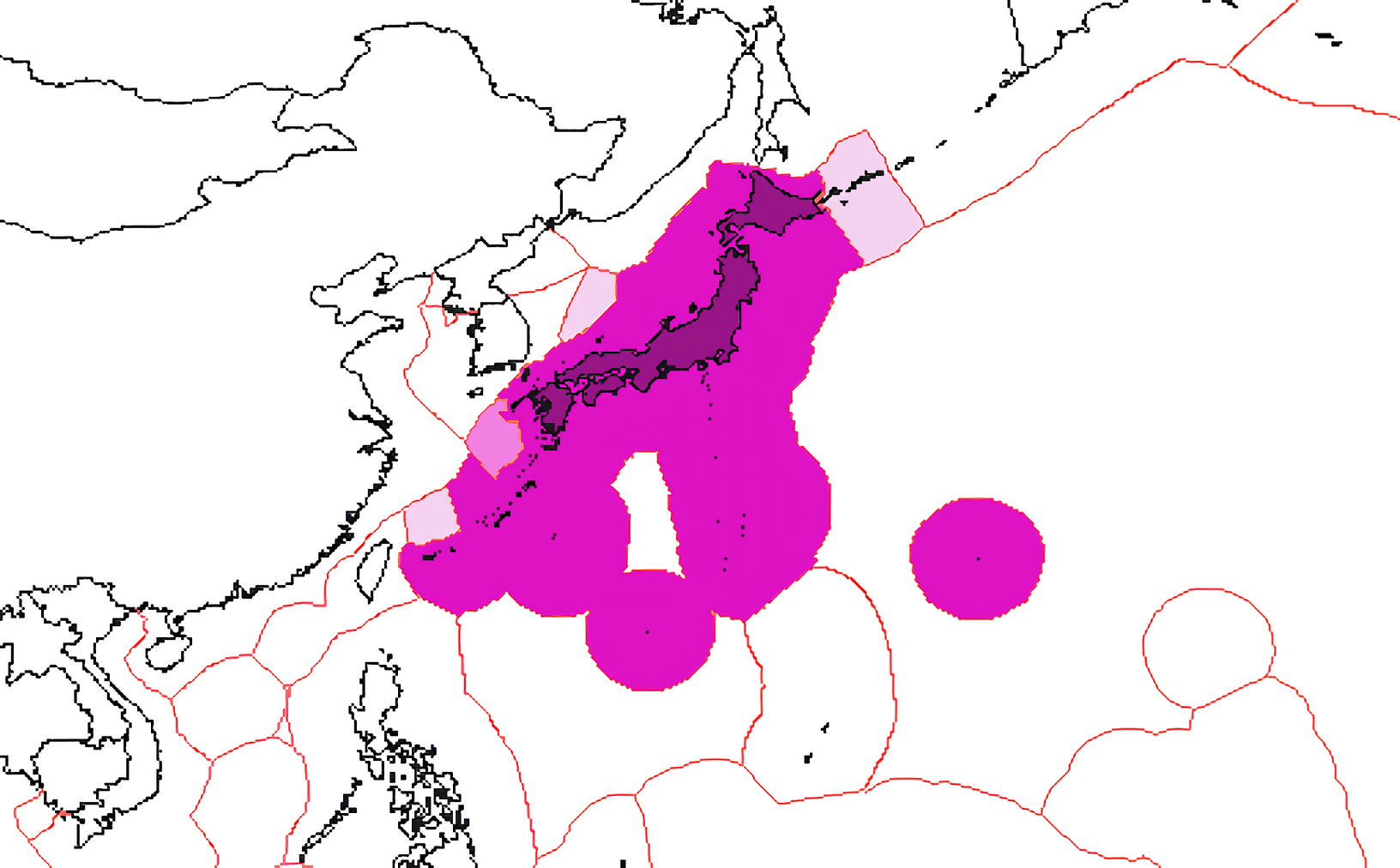
Exclusive economic zone of Japan. Disputed areas are marked in lighter color.

Given the various maritime-related territorial disputes and expanding operational requirements (pictured), the Japanese Maritime Self-Defense (JMSDF) has shown increased interest in augmenting its amphibious lift and expeditionary capabilities. Consequently, several Japanese defense firms such as Japan Marine United Corporation (JMU) and Mitsui Engineering & Shipbuilding (MES) have proposed amphibious warfare options at such industry trade shows as the Maritime Air Systems & Technologies (MAST) and Defence and Security Equipment International (DSEI) exhibits. Also, on March 4, 2014, Japan and the United States announced a bilateral research project on a LCS-style warship pursuant to the Mutual Defense Assistance Act.

==== Amphibious assault ships (LHD) ====
In 2014, Japanese Defense Minister Itsunori Onodera expressed the intention of buying one amphibious assault ship (LHD) from the United States to provide more amphibious capabilities than the current Osumi class landing ships. The Wasp-class amphibious assault ship is most likely candidate for acquisition.

===== JMU design concept =====
During the annual Defence and Security Equipment International (DSEI) tradeshow held 18–19 November 2019 in Chiba, Japan, the Japan Marine United Corporation (JMU) unveiled its proposed design for a big-deck multi-purpose LHD-type amphibious assault ship for the Japan Maritime Self-Defense Force. The vessel's design features a floodable well deck for embarking two LCAC air-cushion landing craft plus 20 AAV7A1 amphibious assault vehicles. Its full-length flight deck boasts five marked landing spots for helicopters or MV-22B tiltrotors. Two below-deck hangars have space for five more rotorcraft. The vessel has a 500-person crew and an embarked unit of 500 marines. The JMU concept art displayed three RIM-116 Rolling Airframe Missile (RAM) SeaRAM launchers located before and aft of the ship's island superstructure, as well as a Mk 15 Phalanx 20mm-Vulcan cannon-armed Close-in Weapon System (CIWS) on the forward deck.

The JMU's proposed LHD vessel's displacement is approximately 20,000 long tons (20,000 t) with an overall length of 720 ft (220 m), a beam of 124 ft (38 m), a draft of 26.25 ft (8.00 m), and a top speed of 24 knots (44 km/h; 28 mph). Overall, the proposed JMSDF amphibious assault ship is substantially smaller than China's Type 075 vessels, South Korea's proposed LPH-II design, the U.S. Navy's Wasp-class amphibious assault ship, and Italian Navy's Trieste, and is more comparable to the Mistral-class amphibious assault ship of the French or the Egyptian navies. A JMU representative told Jane's 360 that while the Japan Maritime Self-Defense Force did not have a current requirement for an LHD-type amphibious assault ship of any kind to join the JMSDF's Self Defense Fleet, the Japan Marine United Corporation still expected the JMSDF to eventually issue such a requirement in the near future, with the JMU design as an alternative to a foreign design.

===== MES design concept =====
At the Maritime Air Systems & Technologies (MAST) 2017 naval defense exhibition held in Tokyo, Mitsui Engineering & Shipbuilding (MES) unveiled a new LHD-type amphibious assault ship for the Japan Maritime Self-Defense Force. MES drew on its experience from constructing and delivering the Osumi and Shimokita tank landing ships (LSTs) to the JMSDF when designing the new LHD. According to Mistui spokesmen, the main missions of the proposed LHD vessel is island defense as well as humanitarian assistance/disaster relief (HA/DR) operations, with the Japan Maritime Self-Defense Force (JMSDF) is reportedly looking to boost its amphibious capabilities in order to protect its Southern Islands.

Mitsui's proposed LHD vessel is designed for large-scale transportation of Landing Craft Air Cushion (LCAC) hovercraft, main battle tanks (MBTs), vehicles, cargo, and equipment, with multi-mission features. Its flight deck LHD has five helicopter spots and a hangar large enough to large helicopters such as the CH-47 Chinook tandem rotor heavy-lift helicopters. Its well deck is large enough to accommodate two LCACs, and it can store at least 24 assault amphibious vehicles (AAVs) on two decks.

The Mitsui LHD concept measures 210 m (689 ft 0 in) in length, 35 m (114 ft 10 in) in width, and draws 7 m (23 ft 0 in) with displacement of 16,000 long tons (16,000 t) and a speed of 22 kn (25 mph; 41 km/h). The maximum complement of the vessel is 200 people including embarked troops. Mitsui's LHD is fitted with a forward Phalanx CIWS gun mount and a SeaRAM launcher at the stern. There are two shafts and two rudders, plus two bow thrusters. There is a main elevator for helicopters aft and a smaller one for stores and equipment forward near the island superstructure. Overall, the Mitsui LHD concept to the French Navy's Mistral-class LHDs.

==== Amphibious transport dock (LPD) ====
At the Maritime Air Systems & Technologies (MAST) 2017 naval defense exhibition held in Tokyo, Mitsui Engineering & Shipbuilding (MES) unveiled a new amphibious transport dock (LPD) concept. According to Mistui spokesmen, the main missions of the proposed LPD vessel is island defense as well as humanitarian assistance/disaster relief (HA/DR) operations, with the Japan Maritime Self-Defense Force (JMSDF) is reportedly looking to boost its amphibious capabilities in order to protect its Southern Islands.

The proposed MES LPD design concept has an aft flight deck with two helicopter spots and a hangar large enough to receive two V-22 Osprey tilt-rotor aircraft and a small size VTOL unmanned aerial vehicle (UAV) similar in size to the MQ-8B Fire Scout. Beneath the flight deck is a well deck large enough to accommodate two Landing Craft Air Cushion (LCAC) hovercraft. Up to 40 AAV, MBT, and APC vehicles can be carried on two lower decks within the ship. The proposed ship measures 210 m (689 ft 0 in) in length, 30 m (98 ft 5 in) in width, and a draft of 7 m (23 ft 0 in) with a displacement of 16,000 long tons (16,000 t) and a speed of 22 kn (25 mph; 41 km/h). The maximum complement of the vessel is 200 people, including embarked troops. The LPD is fitted with a forward Phalanx CIWS gun mount and a SeaRAM launcher on top of the helicopter hangar. The vessel has two shafts and two rudders, as well as two bow thrusters, and also features two retractable fin stabilizers.

==== Mobile landing platform (MLP) ====
At the Maritime Air Systems & Technologies (MAST) 2017 naval defense exhibition held in Tokyo, Mitsui Engineering & Shipbuilding (MES) unveiled its Mobile Landing Platform (MLP) concept designed for large scale transportation of Landing Craft Air Cushion (LCAC) hovercraft, main battle tanks (MBTs), vehicles, cargo, and other equipment, with multi-mission and modular features. In addition to its aviation operations and amphibious capabilities, this MLP can act as an offshore base. The Japan Maritime Self-Defense Force is reportedly looking to boost its amphibious capabilities in order to protect its Southern Islands.

The MES's overall MLP design combines the aviation facilities of the U.S. Navy's Lewis B. Puller-class expeditionary mobile base ships with the extensive amphibious and expeditionary capabilities of the Montford Point-class expeditionary transfer dock vessels. There are four helicopter spots on the flight deck, but no helicopter hanger, with an elevator for stores and equipment next to spot #2. There is also a ramp allowing vehicles access between the two main decks. The MES mobile landing platform concept measures 240 m (787 ft 5 in) in length, 39 m (127 ft 11 in) in width, and a draft of 7 m (23 ft 0 in). The ship's displacement is 21,000 long tons (21,000 t), a speed of 15 kn (17 mph; 28 km/h), and a maximum complement of 240 people.

==== 33DD destroyers ====
The 33DD (also known as DDR or Destroyer Revolution) was a Japanese destroyer proposed for the Japan Maritime Self-Defense Force. The tentative name of the class, 33 DD, is derived from an estimate that it would be budgeted in the Japanese era of Heisei 33 (2021).

==== High Speed Multi-hull Vessel Optimization (HSMVO) ====
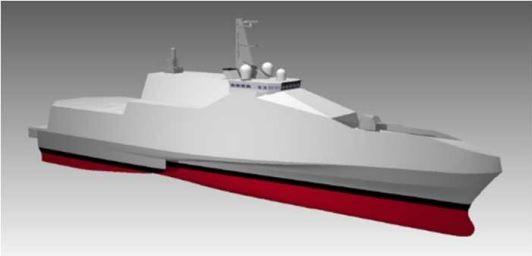
HSMVO artist concept

The joint HSMVO research is conducted by the Acquisition, Technology & Logistics Agency (ATLA) and the Naval Surface Warfare Center Carderock Division of the US Navy. Also known as the Future Multi Purpose Trimaran concept, the HSMVO design concept is based on the Independence-class littoral combat ship with its distinctive trimaran hull design, modular mission capabilities, and aluminum construction (pictured). The mission capabilities of the concept includes mine countermeasure (MCM), humanitarian assistance and disaster recover (HADR), and offshore patrol/special ops. Likewise, each configuration will consist of different weapons, equipment, and supplies.

ATLA unveiled the HSMVO trimaran warship concept model at the Japanese defense trade-show MAST Asia 2017. According to Navy Recognition website, the project is set to end in 2018 and the JMSDF would ultimately decide whether to adopt the concept for development or not. To date, no decision has been made regarding the future acquisition and construction of warships based on the HSMVO design concept.

== Bibliography ==
- IISS (2010). Military Balance 2010. Routledge, London. ISBN 978-1857435573.
