= Hiuchi =

Hiuchi (Japanese: 燧 or 火打山 or ひうち) is a Japanese word that may refer to:

- Hiuchigatake, a stratovolcano in Fukushima Prefecture, Japan.
- Mount Hiuchi, a mountain in Niigata Prefecture, Japan.
- JS Hiuchi, a Hiuchi class Auxiliary Multi-purpose Support (AMS) ship of the Japan Maritime Self-Defense Force (JMSDF).
  - Hiuchi-class support ship, designed to provide Auxiliary Multi-purpose Support (AMS) for the Japanese Maritime Self-Defense Force (JMSDF).
