= JS Suō =

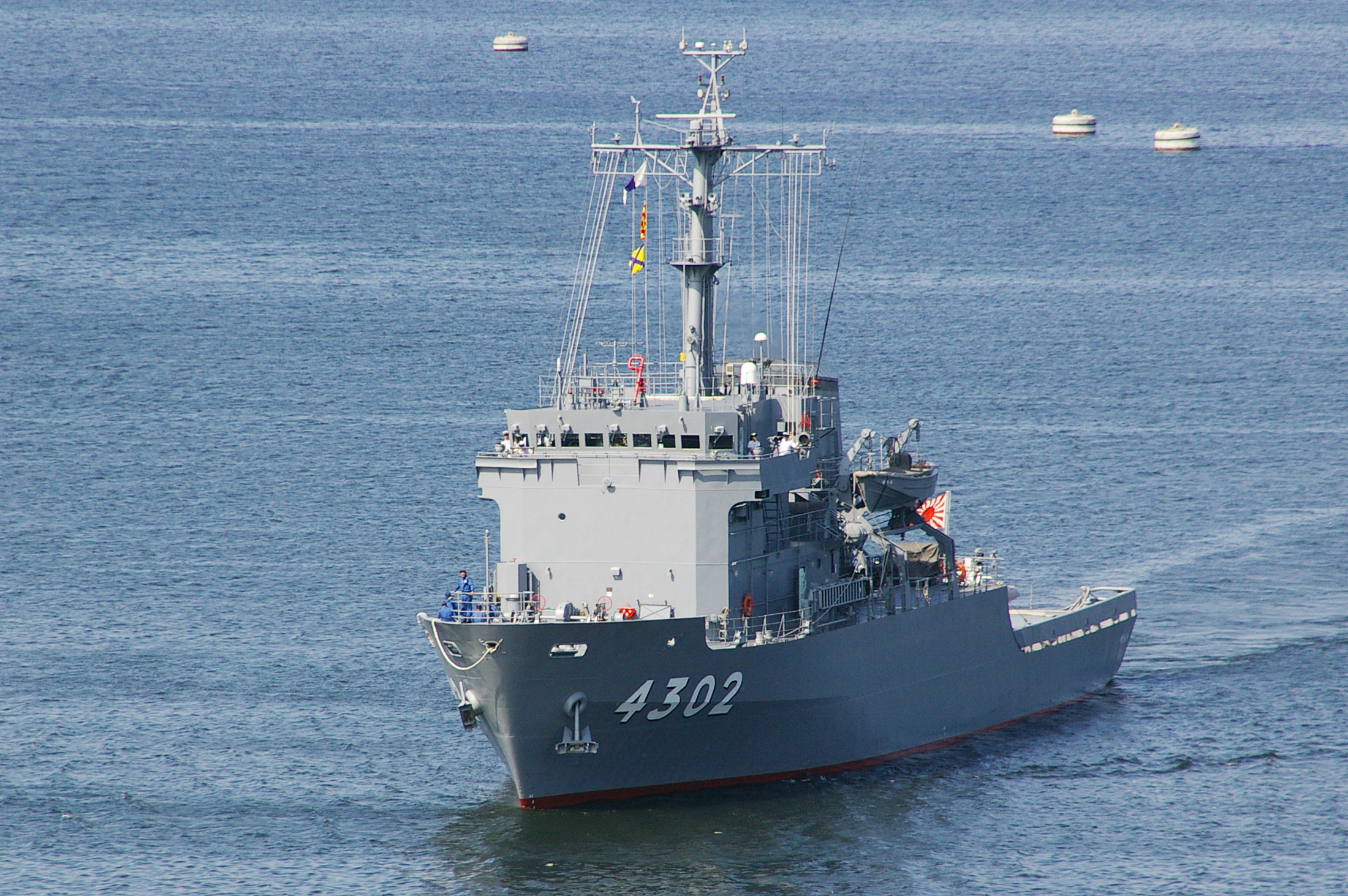

History

Japan
- Name: Suō; (すおう)
- Builder: Universal, Keihin
- Laid down: 19 September 2002
- Launched: 25 April 2003
- Commissioned: 16 March 2004
- Home port: Ominato
- Identification: MMSI number: 431999676
- Status: in active service

General characteristics
- Class & type: Hiuchi, Auxiliary Multi-purpose Support (AMS)
- Displacement: 980 long tons (1,000 t)
- Length: 65 m (213 ft)
- Beam: 12.0 m (39.4 ft)
- Height: 5.8 m (19 ft)
- Draft: 3.5 m (11 ft)
- Propulsion: Diesel
- Speed: 15 knots

JS Suō is a Hiuchi-class Auxiliary Multi-purpose Support (AMS) ship of the Japan Maritime Self-Defense Force (JMSDF).

The ship was built by Universal in Keihin and commissioned into service on 16 March 2004.

The primary mission of the Suō is to support training exercises of other ships, including shooting practice and torpedo launching practice.

== Service ==
This ship was one of several in the JMSDF fleet participating in disaster relief after the 2011 Tohoku earthquake and tsunami.
