= JS Enshu =

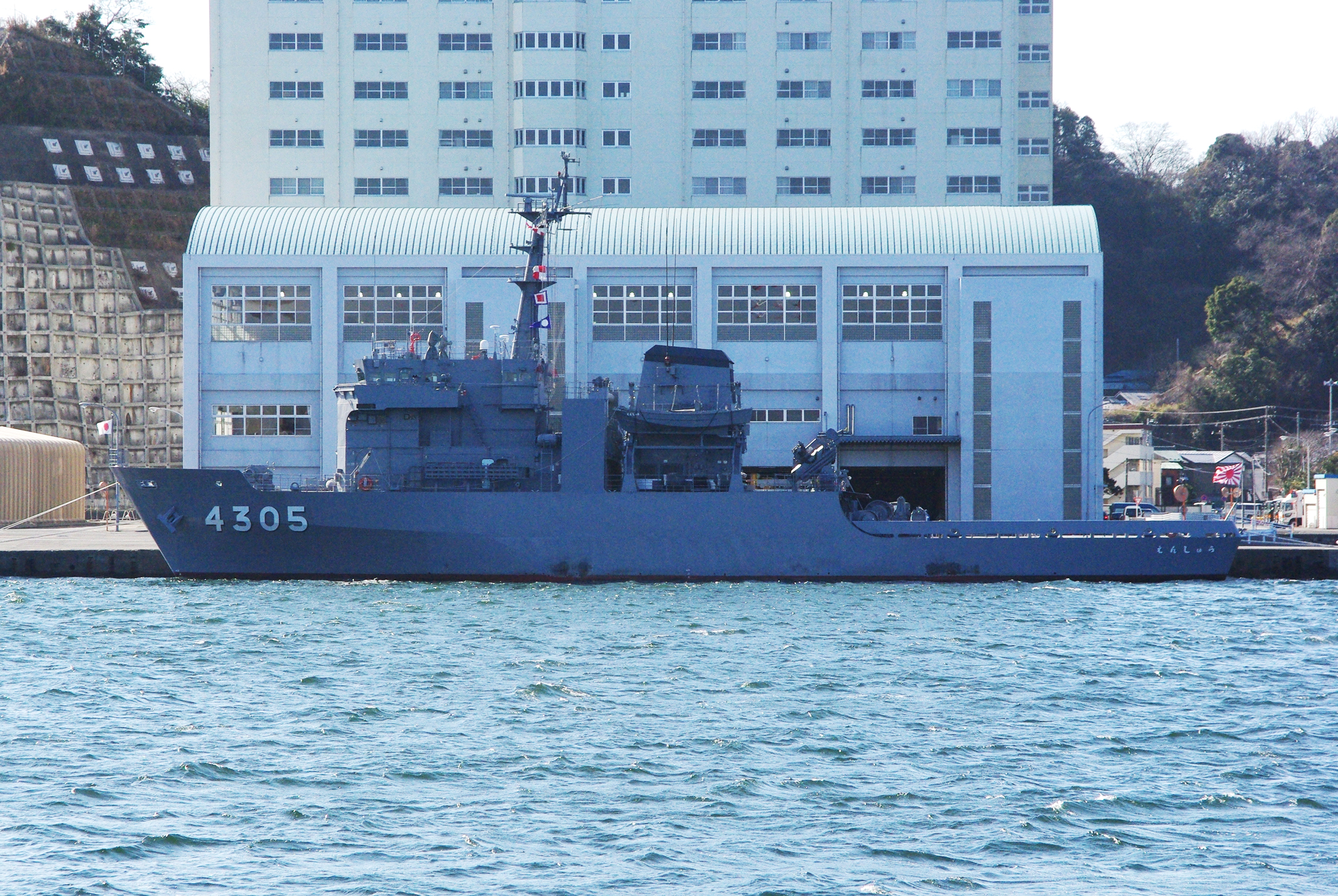

History

Japan
- Name: Enshu; (えんしゅう)
- Builder: Universal, Keihin
- Laid down: 19 December 2006
- Launched: 9 August 2007
- Commissioned: 20 February 2008
- Home port: Yokosuka
- Status: in active service

General characteristics
- Class & type: Hiuchi, Auxiliary Multi-purpose Support (AMS)
- Displacement: 980 long tons (1,000 t)
- Length: 65 m (213 ft)
- Beam: 12.0 m (39.4 ft)
- Height: 5.8 m (19 ft)
- Draft: 3.5 m (11 ft)
- Propulsion: Diesel
- Speed: 15 knots (28 km/h)

JS Enshu is a Hiuchi Class Auxiliary Multi-purpose Support (AMS) ship of the Japan Maritime Self-Defense Force (JMSDF).

The ship was built by Universal in Keihin and commissioned into service on 20 February 2008. The primary mission of the Enshu is to support training exercises of other ships, including shooting practice and torpedo launching practice.
