= JS Genkai =

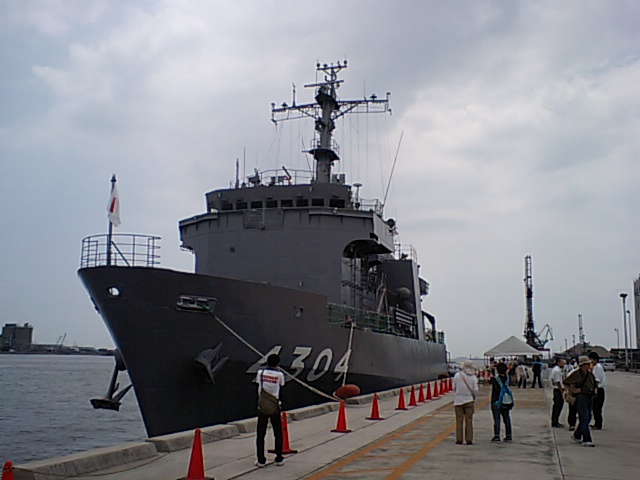

History

Japan
- Name: Genkai; (げんかい)
- Builder: Universal, Keihin
- Laid down: 7 November 2006
- Launched: 24 May 2007
- Commissioned: 20 February 2008
- Home port: Kure
- Identification: MMSI number: 431999691
- Status: in active service

General characteristics
- Class & type: Hiuchi, Auxiliary Multi-purpose Support (AMS)
- Displacement: 980 long tons (1,000 t)
- Length: 65 m (213 ft)
- Beam: 12.0 m (39.4 ft)
- Height: 5.8 m (19 ft)
- Draft: 3.5 m (11 ft)
- Propulsion: Diesel
- Speed: 15 knots (28 km/h)

JS Genkai is a Hiuchi Class Auxiliary Multi-purpose Support (AMS) ship of the Japan Maritime Self-Defense Force (JMSDF).

The ship was built by Universal in Keihin and commissioned into service on 20 Feb 2008.

The primary mission of the Genkai is to support training exercises of other ships, including shooting practice and torpedo launching practice.
