= JS Amakusa =

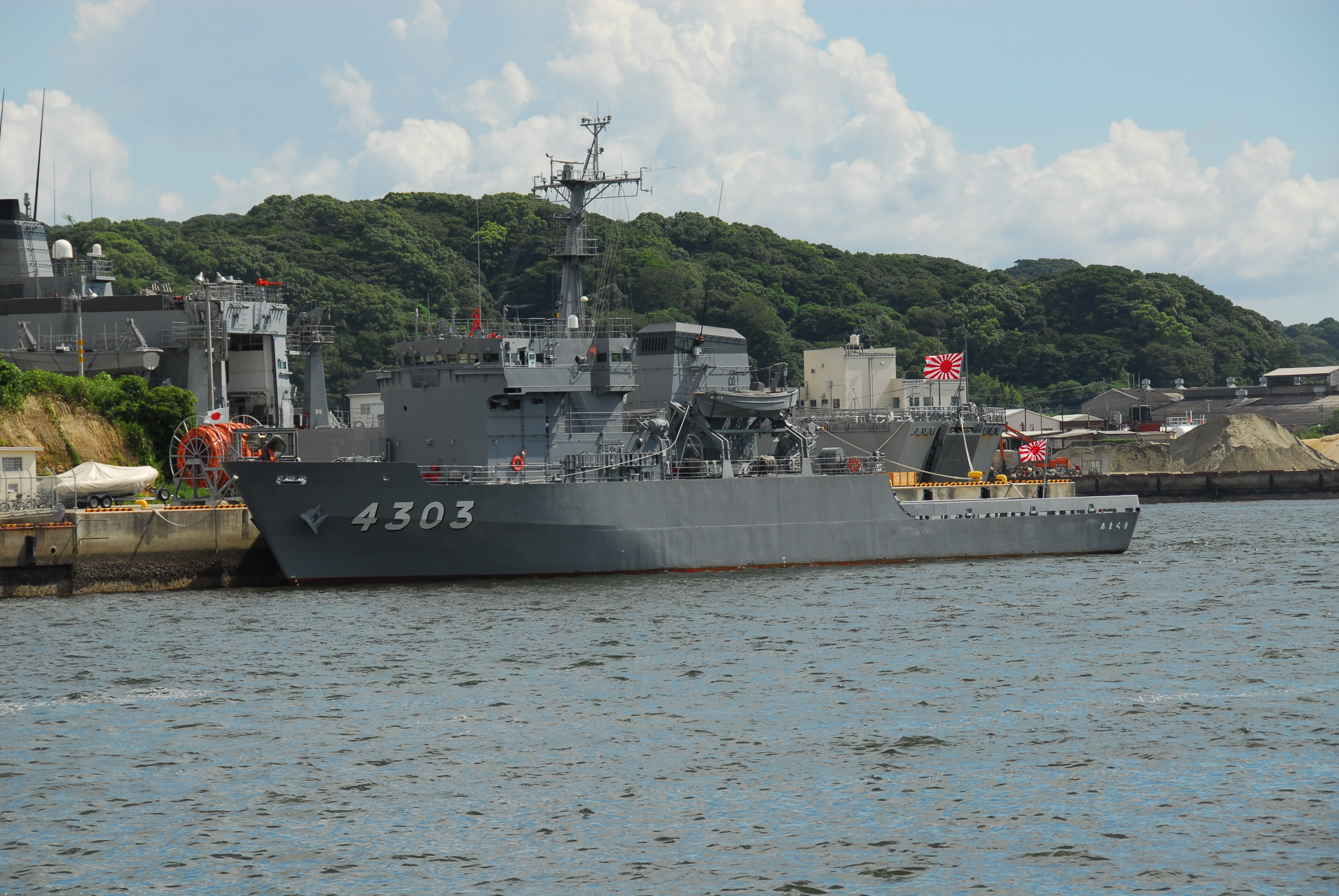
- Amakusa at Sasebo Naval Base in 2007.

History

Japan
- Name: Amakusa; (あまくさ)
- Builder: Universal, Keihin
- Laid down: 3 December 2002
- Launched: 6 August 2003
- Commissioned: 16 March 2004
- Home port: Sasebo
- Identification: MMSI number: 431999677
- Status: in active service

General characteristics
- Class & type: Hiuchi, Auxiliary Multi-purpose Support (AMS)
- Displacement: 980 long tons (1,000 t)
- Length: 65 m (213 ft)
- Beam: 12.0 m (39.4 ft)
- Height: 5.8 m (19 ft)
- Draft: 3.5 m (11 ft)
- Propulsion: Diesel
- Speed: 15 knots

JS Amakusa is a Hiuchi-class Auxiliary Multi-purpose Support (AMS) ship of the Japan Maritime Self-Defense Force (JMSDF).

The ship was built by Universal in Keihin and commissioned into service on 16 March 2004. The primary mission of the Amakusa is to support training exercises of other ships, including shooting practice and torpedo launching practice.

== Service ==
This ship was one of several in the JMSDF fleet participating in disaster relief after the 2011 Tohoku earthquake and tsunami. Akakusa was the second of two JMSDF ships which towed barges of fresh water from Yokosuka to the Fukushima I nuclear accidents. The water was used to replace the seawater being used in cooling efforts at the plant.

On 22 May 2022, the Amakusa conducted surveillance on a PLAN destroyer near Miyako Island.
