= Hiuchi-class support ship =

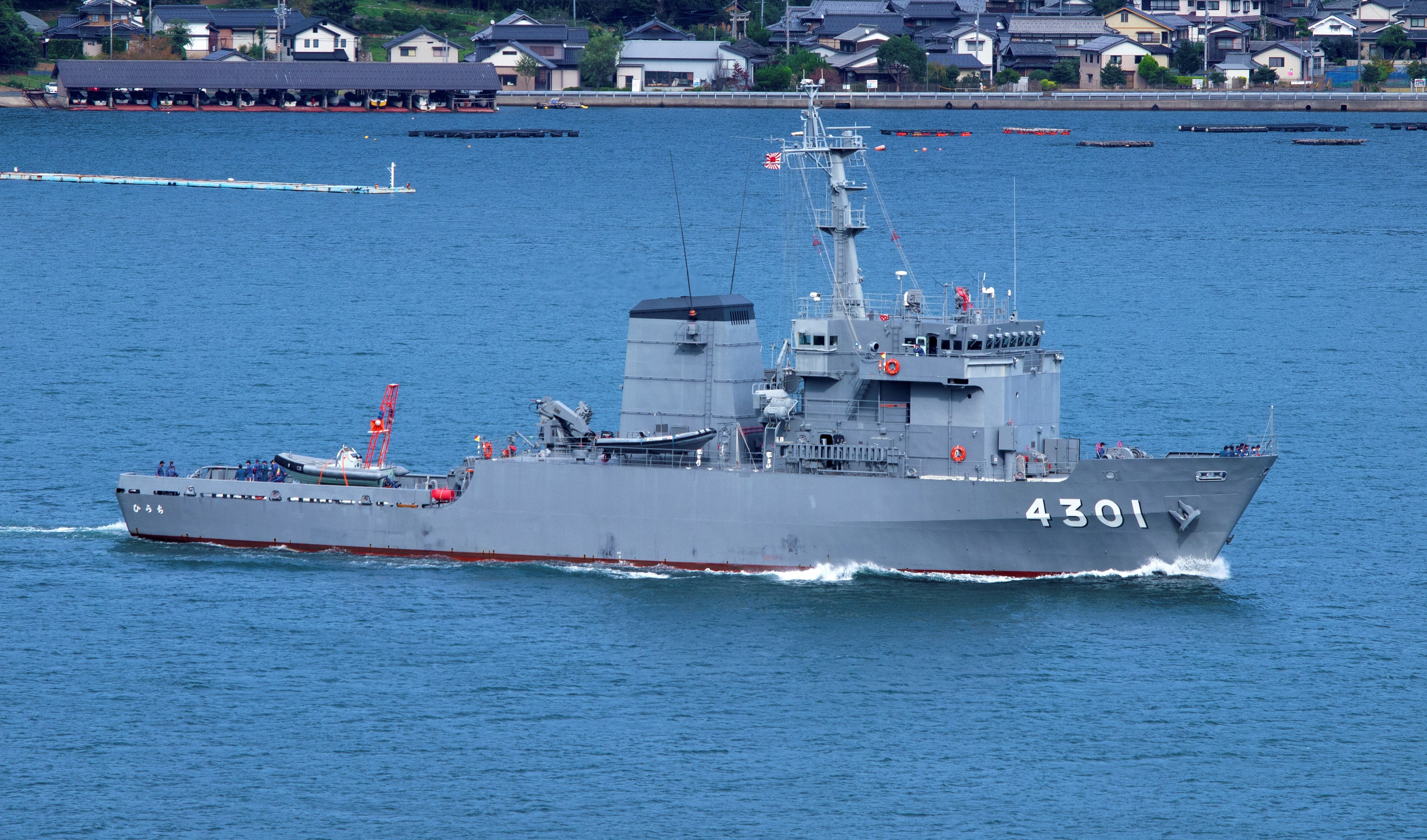

Class overview
- Builders: Mitsui, Tamano; Universal, Keihin
- Operators: Japan Maritime Self-Defense Force

General characteristics
- Class & type: Hiuchi class AMS
- Displacement: 980 long tons (1,000 t)
- Length: 65 m (213 ft)
- Beam: 12.0 m (39.4 ft)
- Height: 5.8 m (19 ft)
- Draft: 3.5 m (11 ft)
- Propulsion: Diesel
- Speed: 15 knots (28 km/h; 17 mph)
- Complement: 40
- Notes: Special Equipment: crane system, towing system, fire system

The Hiuchi class support ship is designed to provide Auxiliary Multi-purpose Support (AMS) for the Japanese Maritime Self-Defense Force (JMSDF).

The Hiuchi AMS class replaced the Auxiliary Service Utility class (ASU). The primary mission of these vessels is to support training exercises of other ships, including shooting practice and torpedo launching practice.

== Ships in the class ==
Pennant No.	Name	Home port	Shipyard	Laid down	Launched	Commissioned
AMS-4301	Hiuchi	Maizuru	Mitsui, Tamano	18 Jan 2001	4 Sept 2001	27 March 2002
AMS-4302	Suo	Ominato	Universal, Keihin	19 Sept 2002	25 April 2003	16 March 2004
AMS-4303	Amakusa	Sasebo	Universal, Keihin	3 Dec 2002	6 Aug 2003	16 March 2004
AMS-4304	Genkai	Kure	Universal, Keihin	7 Nov 2006	24 May 2007	20 Feb 2008
AMS-4305	Enshu	Yokosuka	Universal, Keihin	19 Dec 2006	9 Aug 2007	20 Feb 2008
