= YDT-01-class diving support vessel =

Diving support vessel of JMSDF

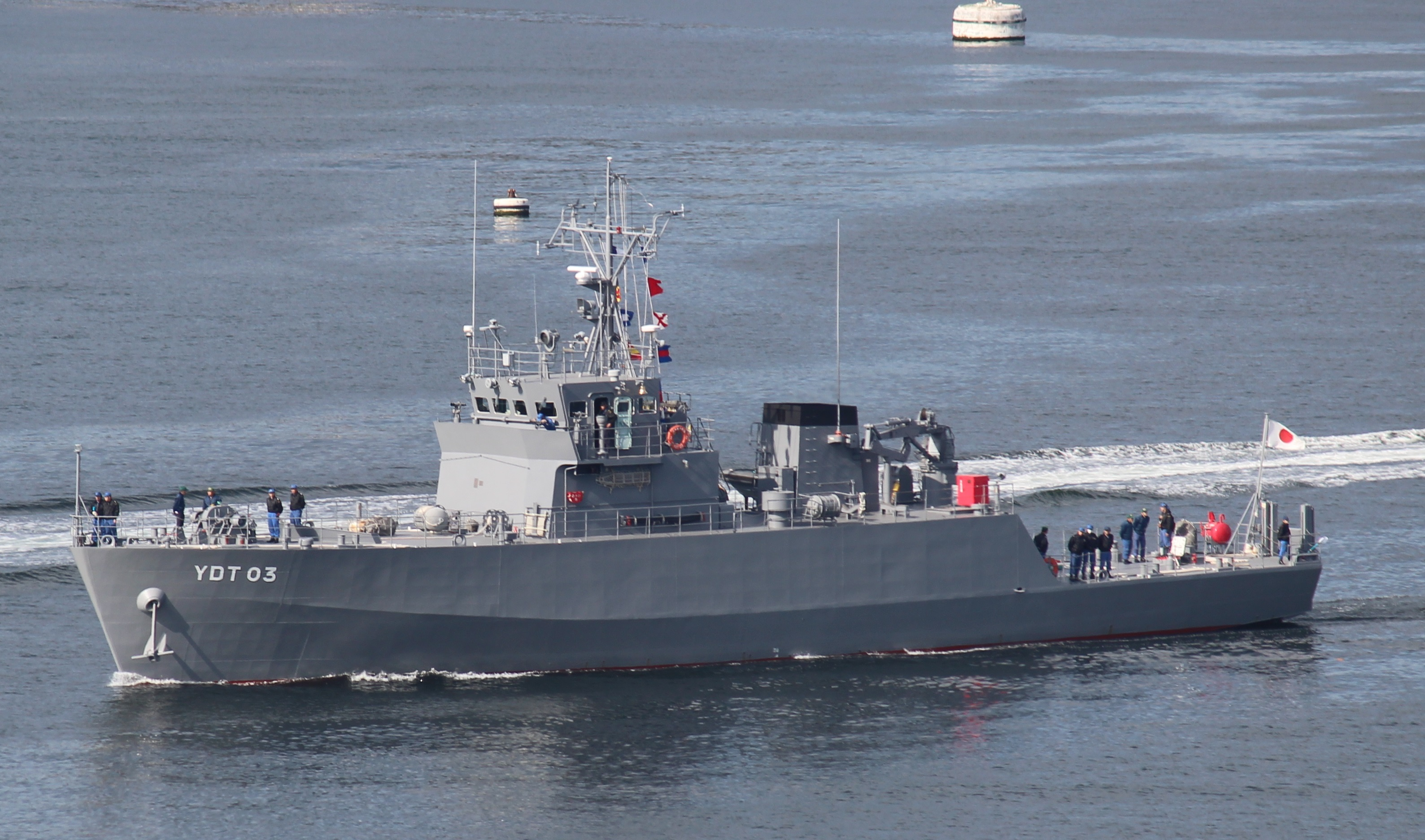
- JS YDT-03

Class overview
- Name: YDT-01
- Builders: Yokohama Yacht Company, Yokohama; Maehata Shipbuilding, Nagasaki
- Built: 1999-2002
- In commission: 2000-present
- Planned: 6
- Completed: 6
- Active: 6

General characteristics
- Type: Diving support vessel
- Displacement: 240 t (240 long tons) standard; 260 t (260 long tons) full load
- Length: 37.5 m (123 ft 0 in)
- Beam: 6.8 m (22 ft 4 in)
- Draft: 2.1 m (6 ft 11 in)
- Depth: 3.7 m (12 ft 2 in)
- Propulsion: 2 × diesel electric engines; 2 × shafts
- Speed: 14 kn (26 km/h; 16 mph)
- Complement: 33
- Sensors & processing systems: AN/SPS-10 surface-search radar; AN/UQS-1D sonar
- Armament: 1 × single Oerlikon 20mm gun

The YDT-01 class is a class of diving support vessel of the Japan Maritime Self-Defense Force (JMSDF).

== Development ==
Traditionally, an auxiliary vessel (YAS), which is a modified retired minesweeper, has been used to support the transportation and work of the Explosive Ordnance Corps (EOD). However, these boats are aging, and since they are modified boats, it has been pointed out that they are unreasonable in terms of placement and lack of equipment. For this reason, this model was planned as a purposefully newly designed ship.

Construction was approved as a new ship type in 1998, and the first and second ships were laid down on June 14, 1999.

== Ships in the class ==
Name	Builders	Laid down	Commissioned	Home port
YDT 01	Yokohama Yacht Company, Yokohama	June 1999	24 March 2000	Maizuru
YDT 02	Yokohama Yacht Company, Yokohama	June 1999	24 March 2000	Ominato
YDT 03	Maehata Shipbuilding, Nagasaki	July 2000	24 March 2001	Yokosuka
YDT 04	Maehata Shipbuilding, Nagasaki	April 2001	18 December 2001	Kure
YDT 05	Maehata Shipbuilding, Nagasaki	April 2002	14 March 2003	Sasebo
YDT 06	Maehata Shipbuilding, Nagasaki	April 2002	14 March 2003	Okinawa
