= JS Kenryū =

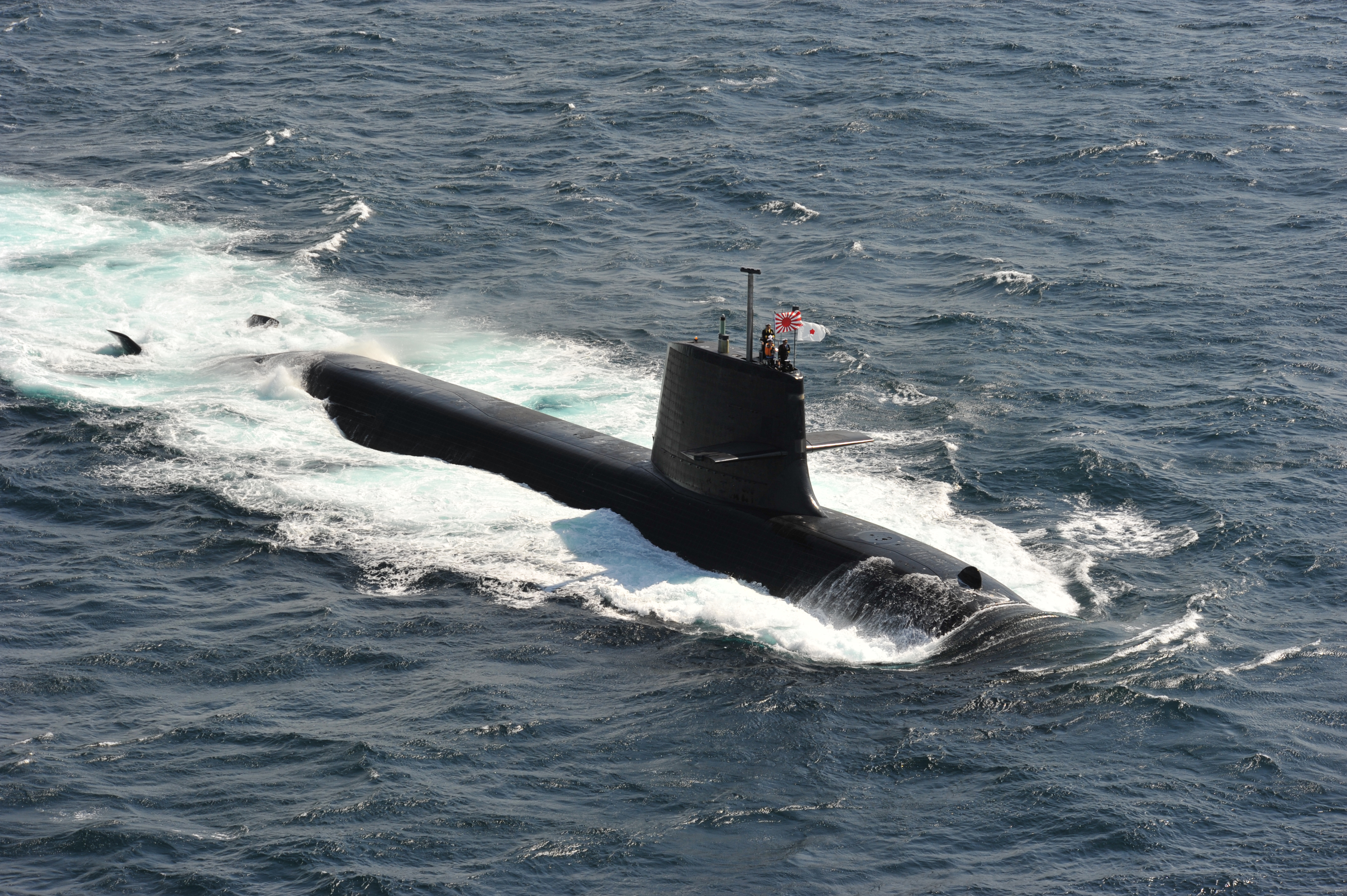
- JS Kenryū

History

Japan
- Name: Kenryū; (けんりゅう)
- Namesake: Bravery dragon
- Ordered: 2007
- Builder: Kawasaki Heavy Industries
- Cost: ¥64.3 billion
- Laid down: 31 March 2008
- Launched: 15 November 2010
- Commissioned: 16 March 2012
- Home port: Kure
- Identification: SS-504
- Status: Active

General characteristics
- Class & type: Sōryū-class attack submarine
- Displacement: Surfaced: 2,900 tonnes (2,854 long tons); Submerged: 4,200 t (4,134 long tons)
- Length: 84.0 m (275 ft 7 in)
- Beam: 9.1 m (29 ft 10 in)
- Draught: 8.5 m (27 ft 11 in)
- Propulsion: 1-shaft 2× Kawasaki 12V 25/25 SB-type diesel engines diesel-electric; 4× Kawasaki Kockums V4-275R Stirling engines; 3,900 hp (2,900 kW) surfaced; 8,000 hp (6,000 kW) submerged
- Speed: Surfaced: 13 kn (24 km/h; 15 mph); Submerged: 20 kn (37 km/h; 23 mph)
- Range: AIP endurance (est.): 6,100 nautical miles (11,300 km; 7,000 mi) at 6.5 knots (12.0 km/h; 7.5 mph)
- Complement: 65 (9 officers, 56 enlisted)
- Sensors & processing systems: ZPS-6F surface/low-level air search radar; Hughes/Oki ZQQ-7 Sonar suite: 1× bow-array, 4× LF flank arrays and 1× Towed array sonar
- Electronic warfare & decoys: ZLR-3-6 ESM equipment; 2× 3-inch underwater countermeasure launcher tubes for launching of Acoustic Device Countermeasures (ADCs)
- Armament: 6 × HU-606 21 in (533 mm) torpedo tubes with 30 reloads for: 1.) Type 89 torpedo; 2.) Harpoon (missile); Mines

JS Kenryū (SS-504) is the fourth boat of Sōryū-class submarines. She was commissioned into the Japan Maritime Self-Defense Force on 16 March 2012.

== Construction and career ==
Kenryū was laid down at Kawasaki Heavy Industries Kobe Shipyard on March 31, 2008, as the 2007 plan 2900-ton submarine No. 8119 based on the medium-term defense capability development plan. At the launching ceremony, she was named Kenryū and launched on 15 November 2010. She was commissioned on 16 March 2012 and deployed to Kure.

Kenryū participated in US dispatch training (to Hawaii) from January 18 to April 9, 2016.

From February 12 to May 10, 2020, Kenryū was dispatched as part of offshore training and facility utilization training conducted in the Hawaiian Islands area.

== Gallery ==
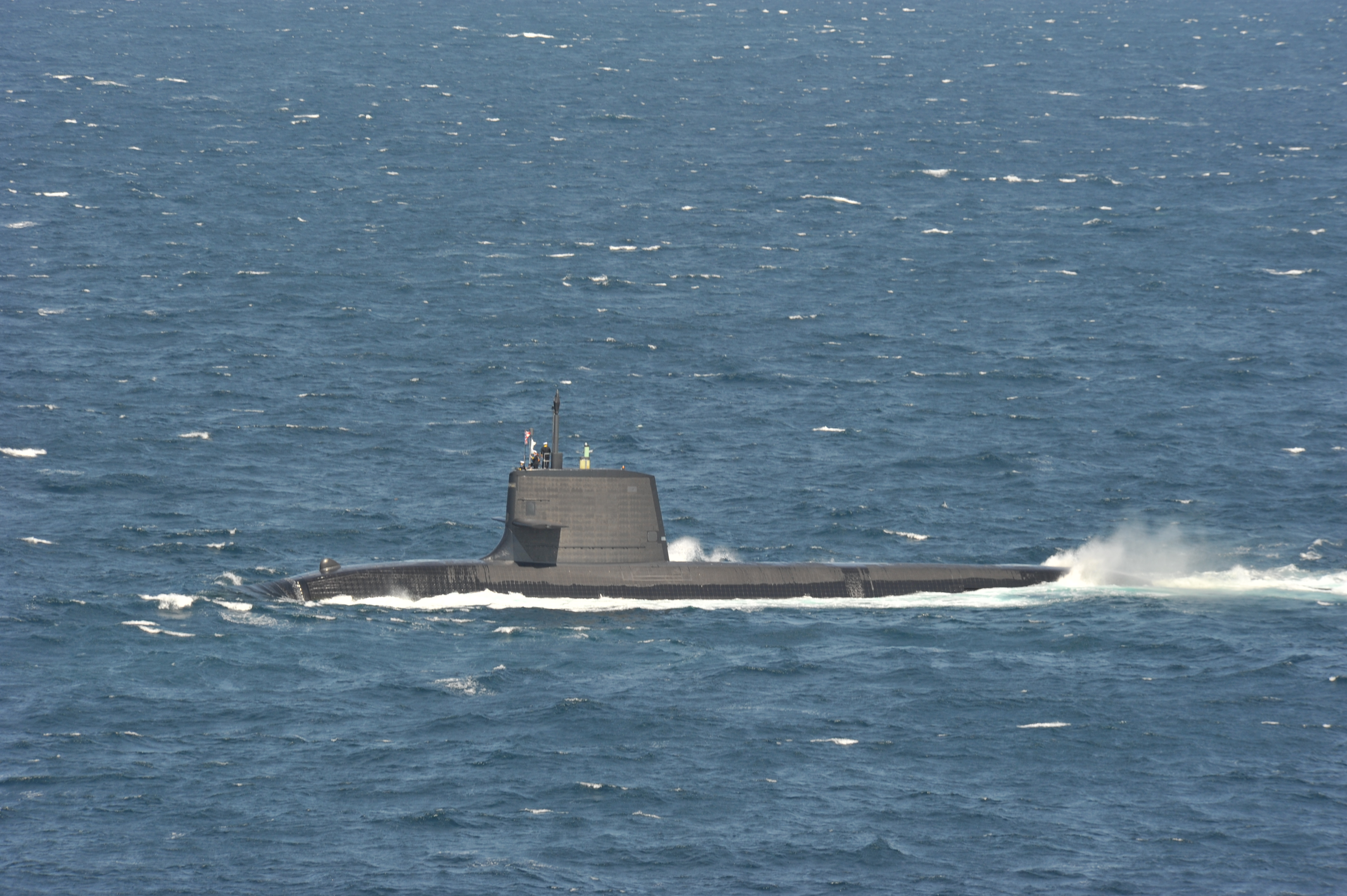
JS Kenryū underway, date unknown.

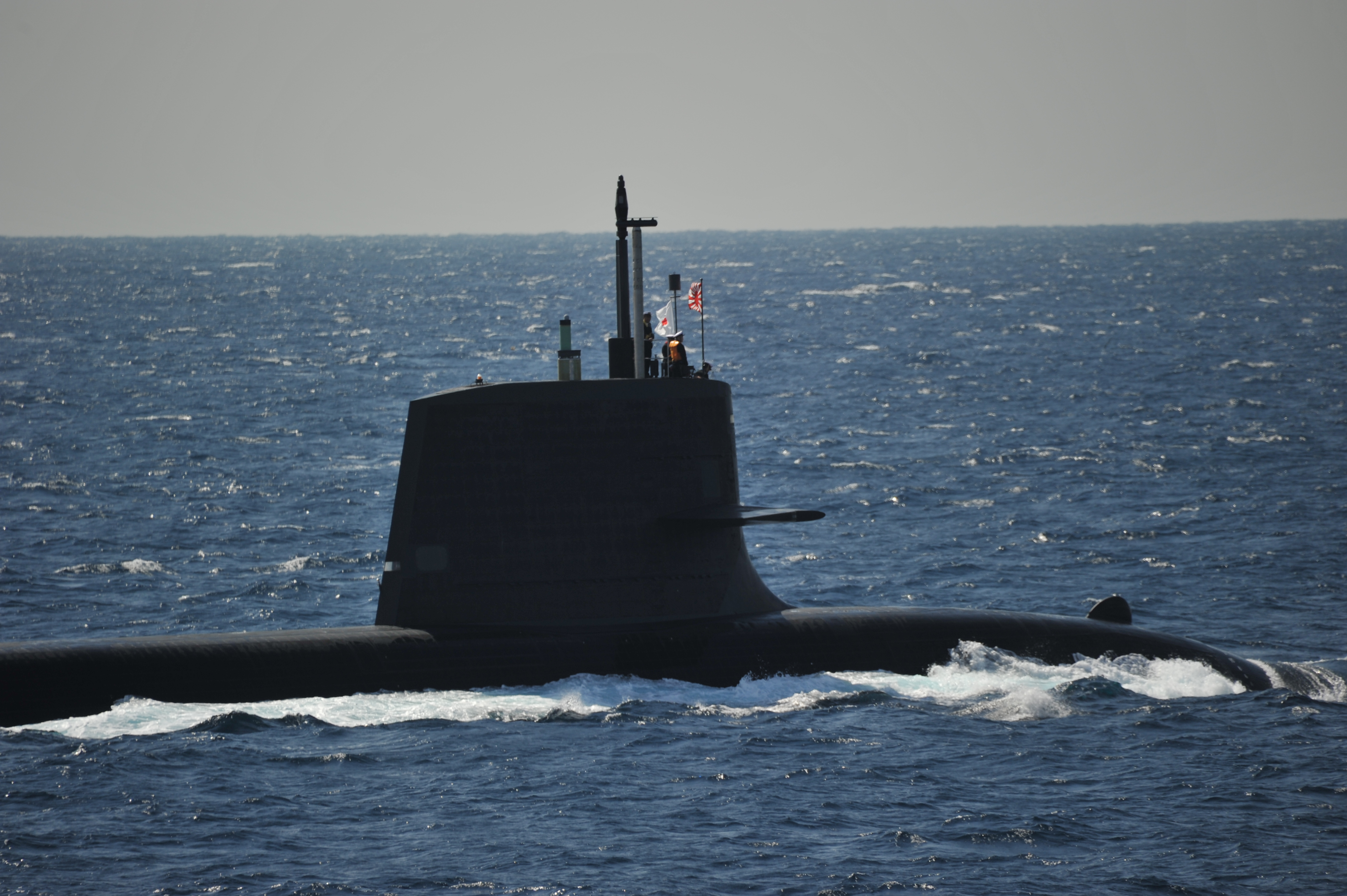
JS Kenryū underway, date unknown.

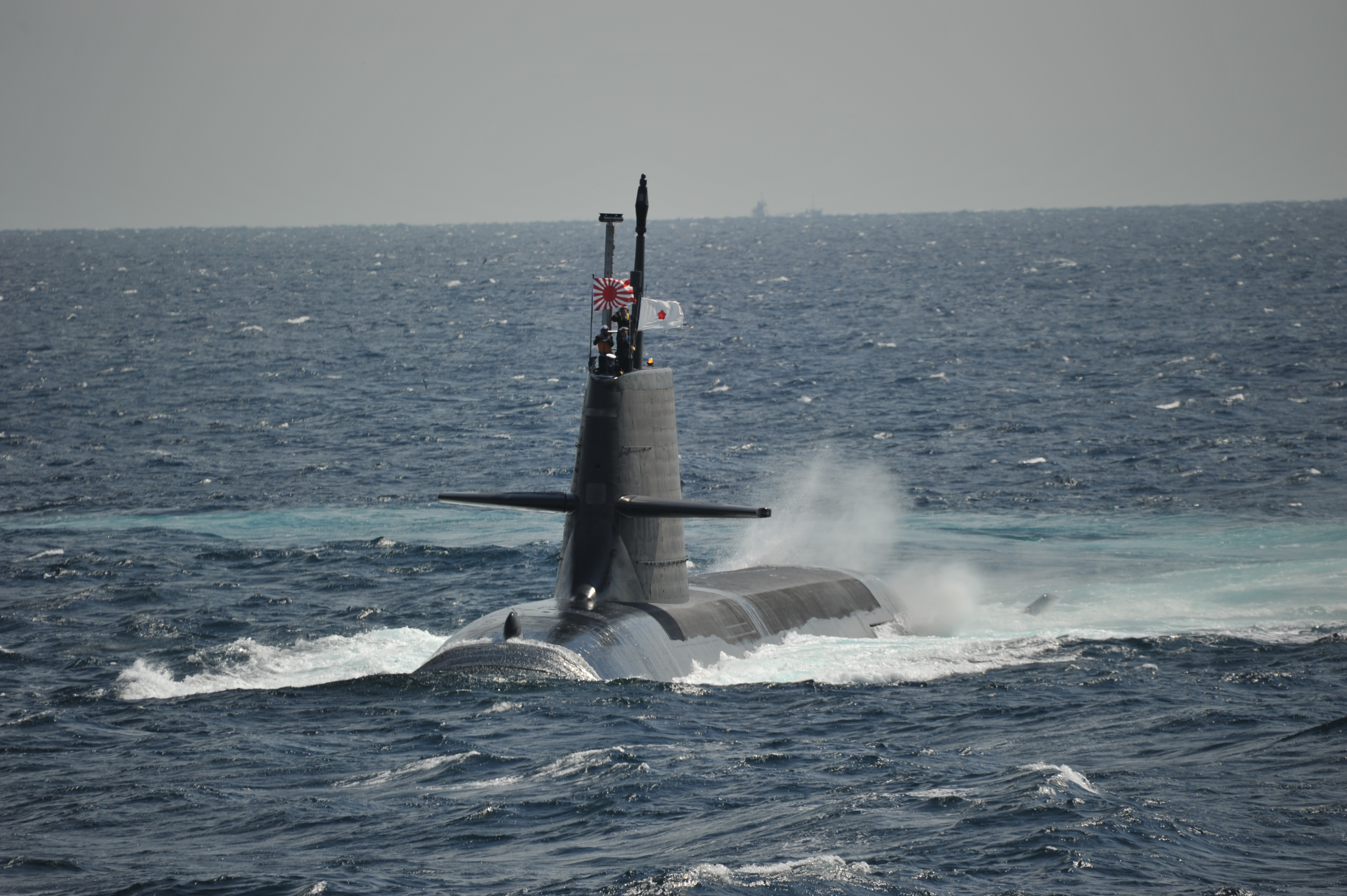
JS Kenryū underway, date unknown.
