= Mitsui E&S =

Japanese shipbuilder

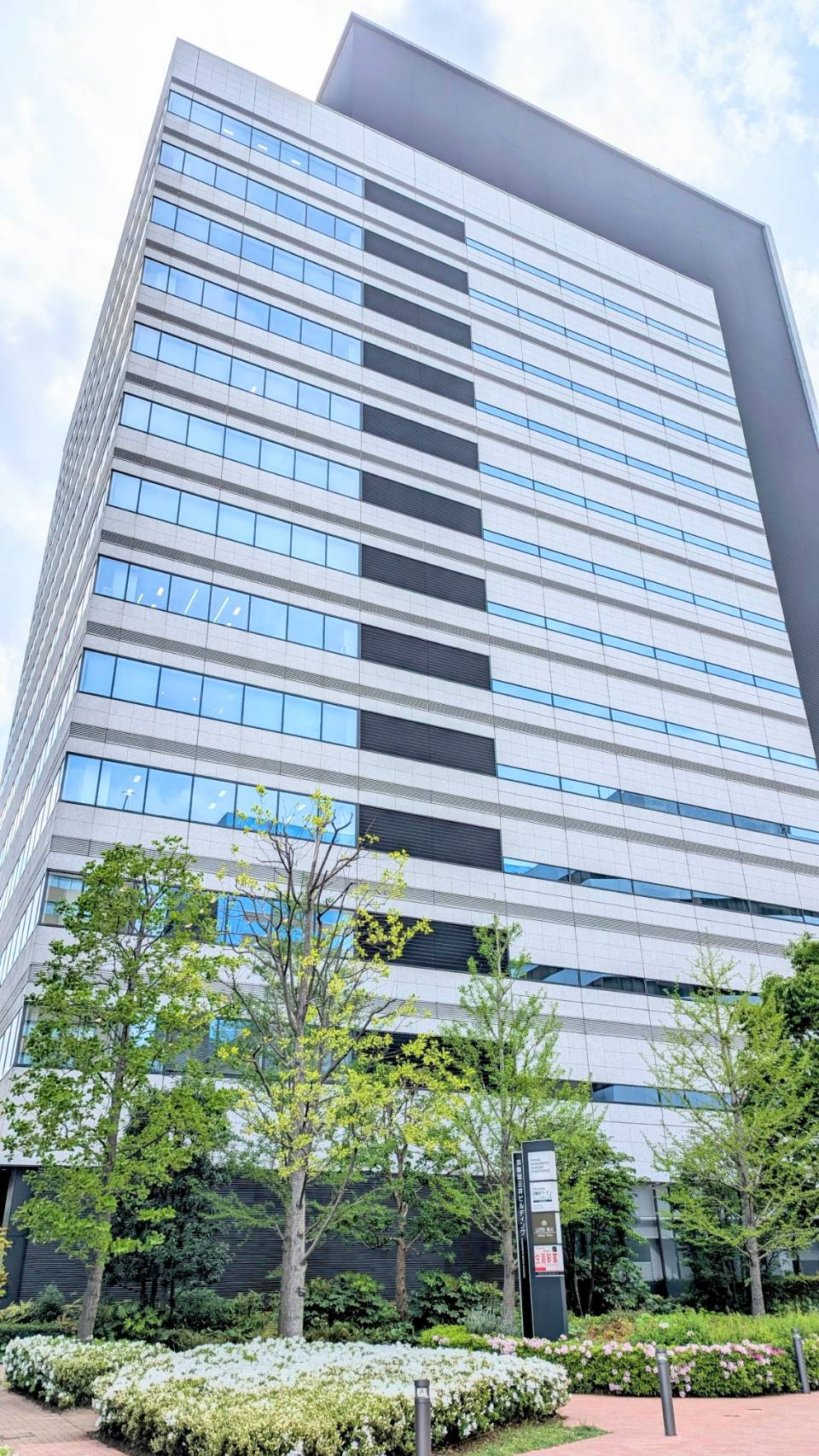
- Headquarters in Chūō, Tokyo, Japan
- Native name: 三井E＆S
- Type: Public (K.K)
- Traded as: TYO: 7003; Nikkei 225 Component
- ISIN: JP3891600003
- Industry: Machinery; Shipbuilding
- Founded: November 17, 1917; 108 years ago
- Headquarters: Tsukiji, Chuo-ku, Tokyo 104-8439, Japan
- Area served: Worldwide
- Key people: Takao Tanaka (President and CEO)
- Products: Bulk carriers; Crude oil tankers; Container ships; Floating oil and gas production facilities; Diesel engines; Container cranes; Chemical plants; Oil refineries; Water treatment plants; Waste treatment plants; Boilers
- Revenue: ¥731 billion (FY 2016) (US$ 6.6 billion) (FY 2016)
- Net income: ¥12.1 billion (FY 2016) (US$ 111.5 million) (FY 2016)
- Number of employees: 13,171 (consolidated, as of March 31, 2017)
- Website: Official website

Mitsui E&S (三井E&S, Mitsui E&S) (TYO: 7003) is a Japanese heavy industries company. Despite its name, it no longer builds ships and now focuses mainly on production of high-value ship equipment such as engines and automated gantry cranes.

Mitsui E&S is the largest supplier of gantry cranes in Japan with a market share of nearly 90 per cent, and its products are used at major ports such as Long Beach, Los Angeles, Mombasa, Ho Chi Minh, and Klang.

== History ==
Mitsui E&S was established in 1917 as the Shipbuilding Division of Mitsui & Co. with the first shipyard at Tamano. It built the first Japan-built diesel-propelled merchant ship, Akagisan Maru (赤城山丸) in 1924. With its success, it began manufacturing diesel engines under a license agreement with Burmeister & Wain in Denmark.

In 1937, the shipyards became a separate entity within the Mitsui zaibatsu, Tama Shipyard. The company changed its name to Mitsui Shipbuilding & Engineering Co., Ltd. in 1942. In 1948, Mitsui E&S built the first Japan-built ship to be exported after the loss of the Second World War, S.S.Knurr (a Norwegian whaling ship). In 1951, it started its chemical plants business by building a nylon production plant for Toray Industries.

In 1961, it built 'the world's first automated ship' Kinkasan maru (金華山丸) for Mitsui O.S.K. Lines. This ship was the first of its scale to control the entire engine room from the bridge, and other major parts of the ship were also automatically or remotely controlled from the bridge.

In 1967, as the container ship age dawned, it built its first gantry cranes for container ships. In 1975, it built the Berge Emperor, which was the longest ship ever built at that time, measuring 391.83m, for Bergesen d.y. in Norway.

Mitsui E&S acquired Burmeister & Wain's engineering and construction business in 1990, and through this acquisition, it also acquired Burmeister's boiler business in 2017, which primarily caters to small and medium biomass power plants.

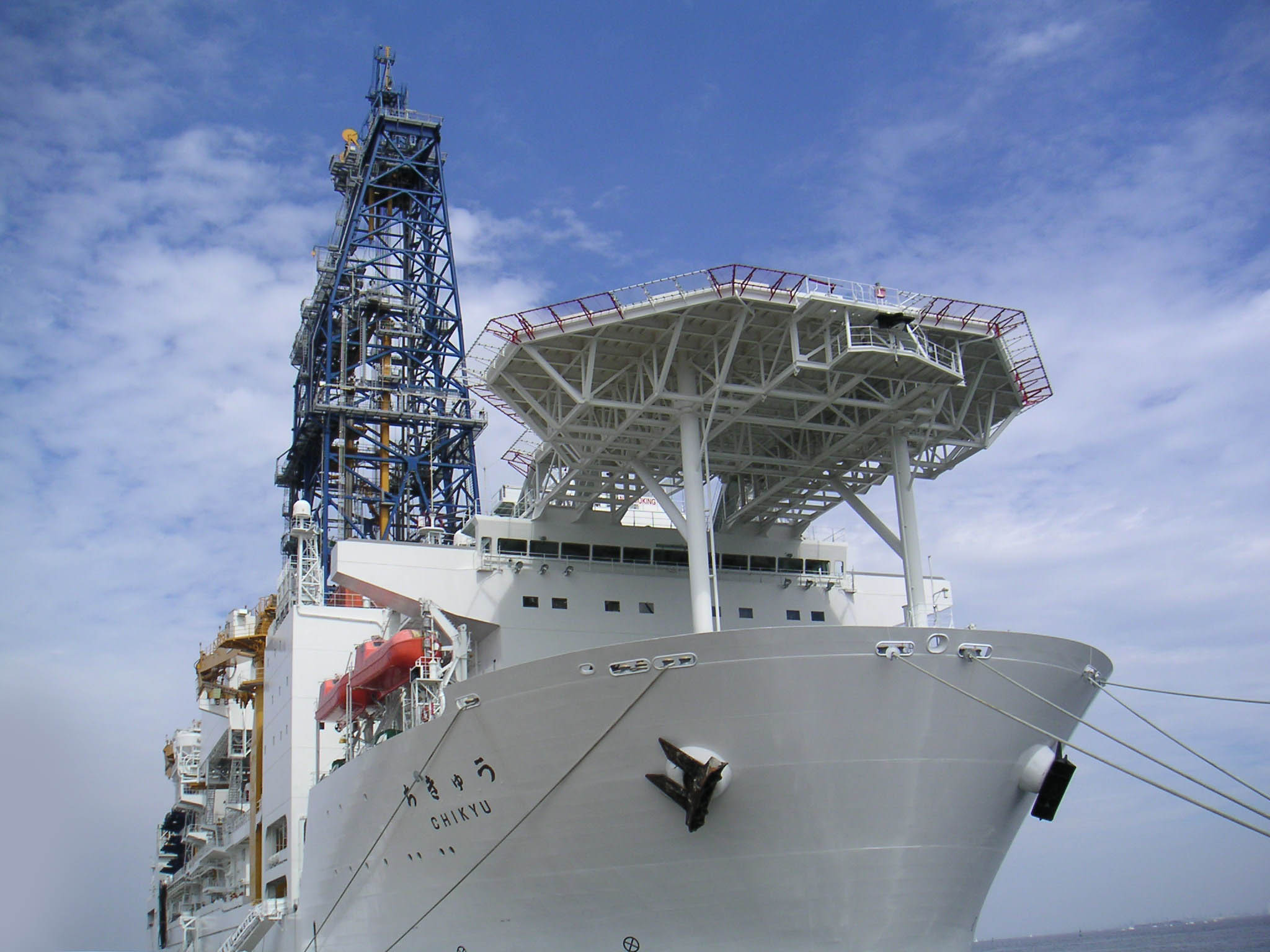
Scientific drill ship Chikyu, built at Tamano Works in 2002

Mitsui E&S split its naval and merchant shipbuilding businesses in 2021, selling the former (including the Tamano Shipyard) to Mitsubishi Heavy Industries and selling a 49% stake in the latter to Tsuneishi Shipbuilding. Tsuneishi took over a majority stake of the merchant shipbuilding business in 2022 as Mitsui E&S refocused its strategy on marine engines, port cranes, and other machinery.

In 2022, Mitsui E&S agreed to purchase IHI's marine engine business, and announced that it was in the process of developing ammonia-fueled marine engine technologies as a means of reducing CO_{2} emissions.

In 2025, Tsuneishi Shipbuilding took full ownership of the shipbuilding division of Mitsui Engineering & Shipbuilding.

== PACECO ==
PACECO CORP. is a wholly owned subsidiary of Mitsui E&S headquartered in Hayward, California. It built the first dedicated ship-to-shore container crane in the world in 1958. On 22 February 2024, the White House announced that as part of its 20-billion-dollar scheme to upgrade and secure the country's port infrastructure, Mitsui E&S and PACECO are planning to resume manufacturing cranes in the US.

== Facilities ==
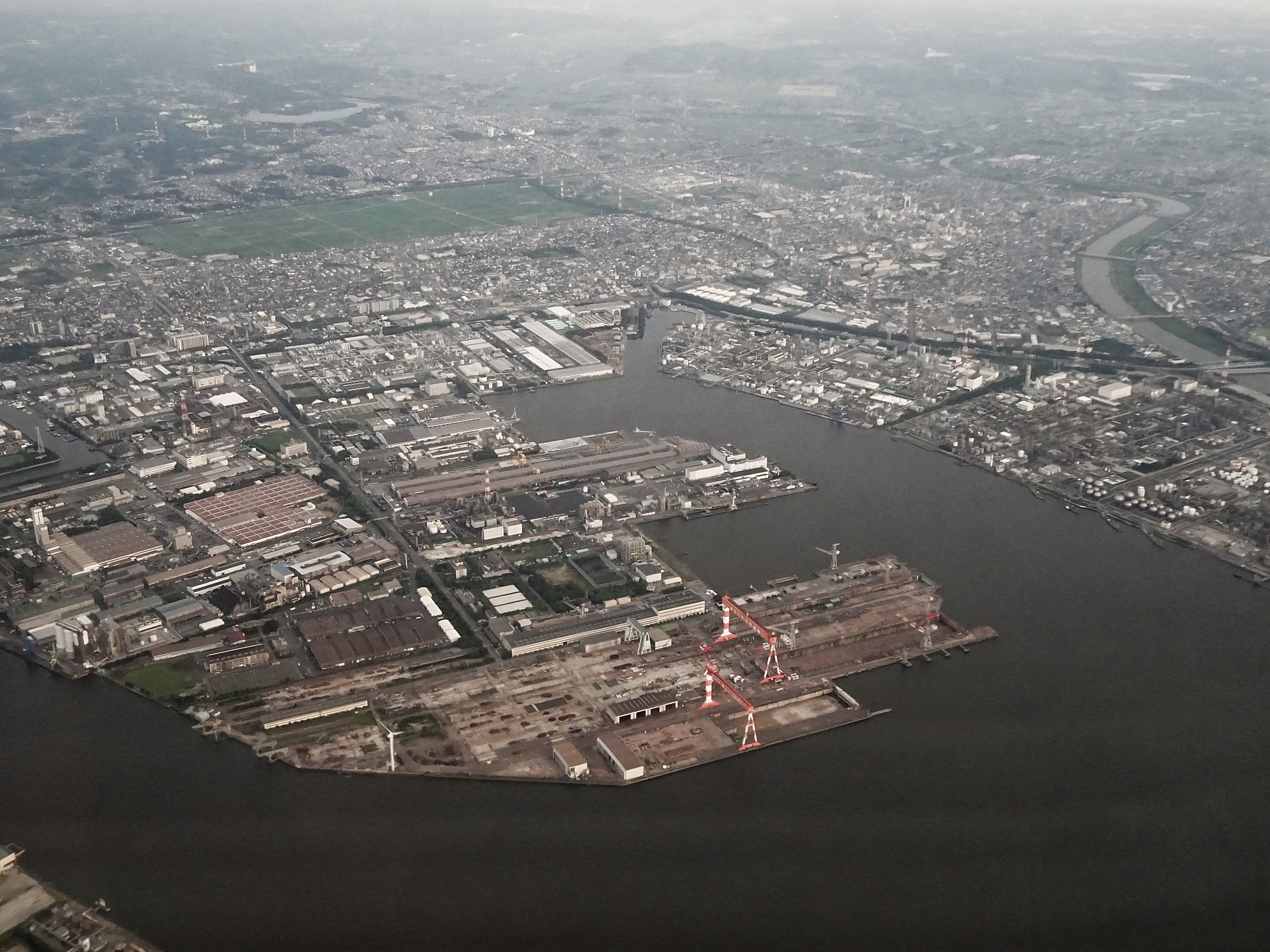
Mitsui E&S Chiba Works (2023)

Mitsui E&S has works in Tamano, Ichikawa, and Oita, and business offices in Tokyo, Nagoya, Osaka, Oita, Hanoi, Jakarta, London, and Shanghai.

== Notable ships ==
=== Imperial Japanese Navy ===
- Shimushu-class escorts Shimushu and Ishigaki
- Etorofu-class escorts Matsuwa, Iki, Wakamiya, and Manju
- Ukuru-class escorts Inagi, Habuchi, Oshika, Kanawa, and Takane
- Atami-class gunboat Atami
- Gunboat Kotaka
- Ōtori-class torpedo boat Kiji
- W-1-class minesweeper W-2
- W-5-class minesweeper W-5
- W-7-class minesweeper W-7
- W-13-class minesweeper W-16
- W-17-class minesweeper W-18
- No. 4-class submarine chaser Nos. 8 and 12
- No. 13-class submarine chaser Nos. 14 and 20
- No. 28-class submarine chaser Nos. 30, 33, and 37
- Hirashima-class auxiliary ships Hoko and Niizaki

=== Japan Maritime Self-Defense Force ===
- 2 Ōsumi class LST - 4001 and 4002
- 1 Hiuchi class support ship - JS Hiuchi (AMS-4301)
- 1 W-7 Class minesweeper (W-7)
- Abukuma class destroyer escorts

=== Ocean liners ===
- Ukishima Maru
- Hōkoku Maru
- Aikoku Maru
- Gokoku Maru

=== Tankers ===
- Berge Emperor

=== Bulkers ===
- Mitsui 56 series: A popular type of bulk carrier. As of January 2013, Mitsui had built 151 of them.
