= JS Nagara =

Mogami-class frigate

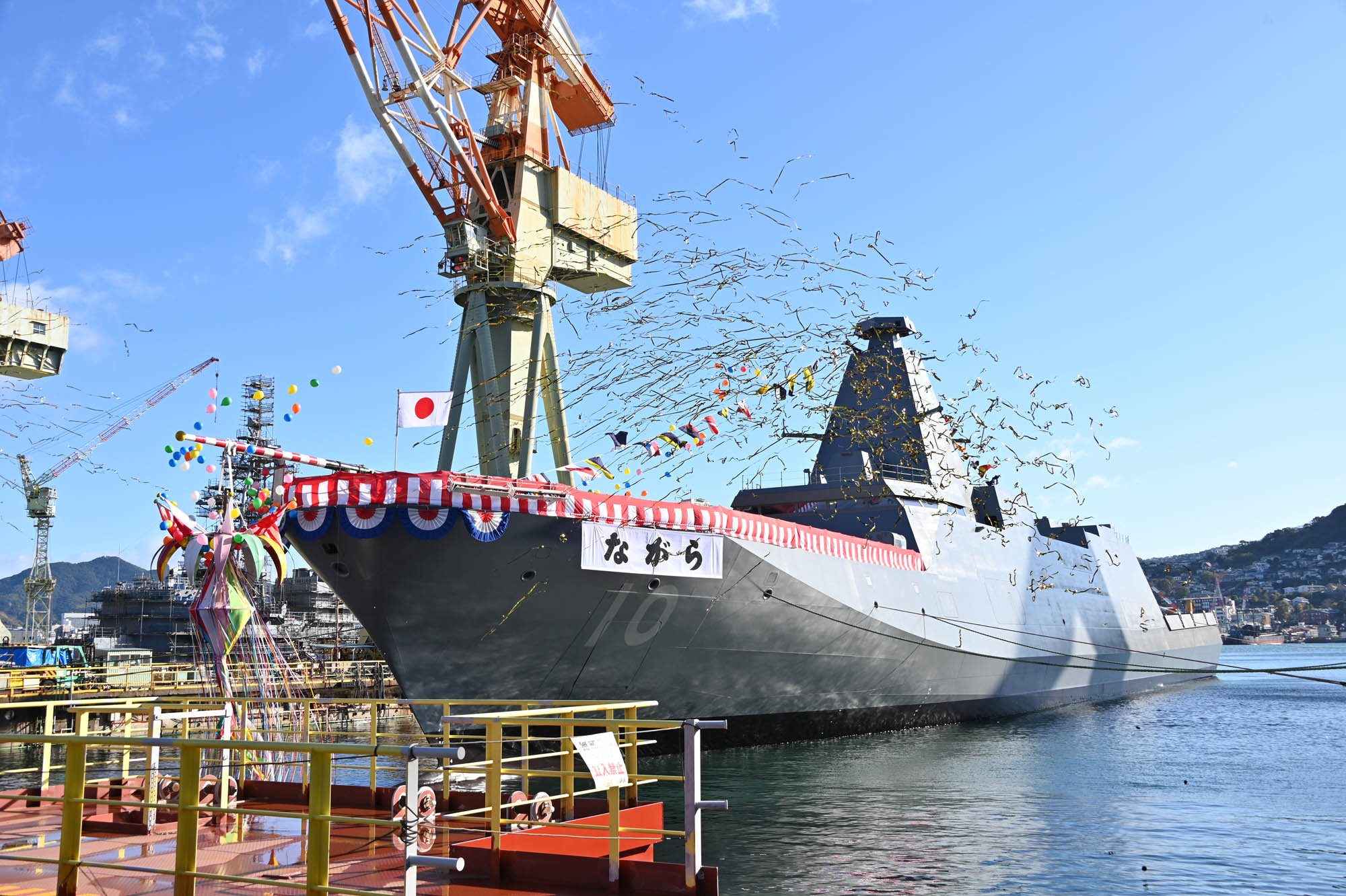
- Nagara being launched

History

Japan
- Name: Nagara
- Namesake: Nagara River
- Builder: Mitsubishi Heavy Industries Nagasaki Shipyard
- Cost: About 51.4 billion yen
- Laid down: 6 July 2023
- Launched: 19 December 2024
- Commissioned: 29 June 2026
- Home port: Kure
- Identification: Pennant number: FFM-10
- Status: Active

General characteristics
- Class & type: Mogami-class frigate
- Displacement: 3,900 t (3,800 long tons; 4,300 short tons) (standard); 5,500 t (5,400 long tons; 6,100 short tons) (full load)
- Length: 132.5 m (434 ft 9 in)
- Beam: 16.3 m (53 ft 6 in)
- Draft: 9 m (29 ft 6 in)
- Propulsion: CODAG; 1 × Rolls-Royce MT30 gas turbine; 2 × MAN Diesel V28/33DD STC engine; 2 × shafts
- Speed: 30 knots (56 km/h; 35 mph)
- Boats & landing craft carried: 2 × RHIB, UUV, USV
- Crew: 90-100
- Sensors & processing systems: OPY-2 (X-band multi-purpose AESA radar); OAX-3(EO/IR); OQQ-25 (VDS + TASS); OQQ-11 (Mine-hunting sonar); OYQ-1 (Combat management system); OYX-1-29 (Console display system)
- Electronic warfare & decoys: NOLQ-3E (Passive radar system + Electronic attack capability is integrated into the main radar antenna), Chaff dispenser
- Armament: 1 × 5 in (127 mm) Mk-45 Mod 4 naval gun; 2 × missile canisters for a total of 8 Type 17 anti-ship missiles; 1 × SeaRAM; Type 12 torpedoes; Simplified mine laying equipment; 2 × Mk-41 VLS (16 cells total); Naval version of Type 03 Chū-SAM; 2 × Remote weapon station

Nagara (ながら) is a frigate of the Japan Maritime Self-Defense Force (JMSDF), and the tenth ship of the Mogami class. She is named after the Nagara River, becoming the second ship to bear this name, after the Imperial Japanese Navy's Nagara-class cruiser Nagara, as well as being the first in the JMSDF era to be named in this manner.

== History ==
Nagara was ordered by Mitsubishi Heavy Industries as part of the JMSDF's 2022 Mid-Term Defense Program and was laid down at MHI's Nagasaki Shipyard on 6 July 2023. After being christened and launched on 19 December 2024, Nagara underwent a period of being fitted out and sea trials before her commissioning on 29 June 2026.
