= JS Hiuchi =

Naval AMS vessel of the Japanese Navy

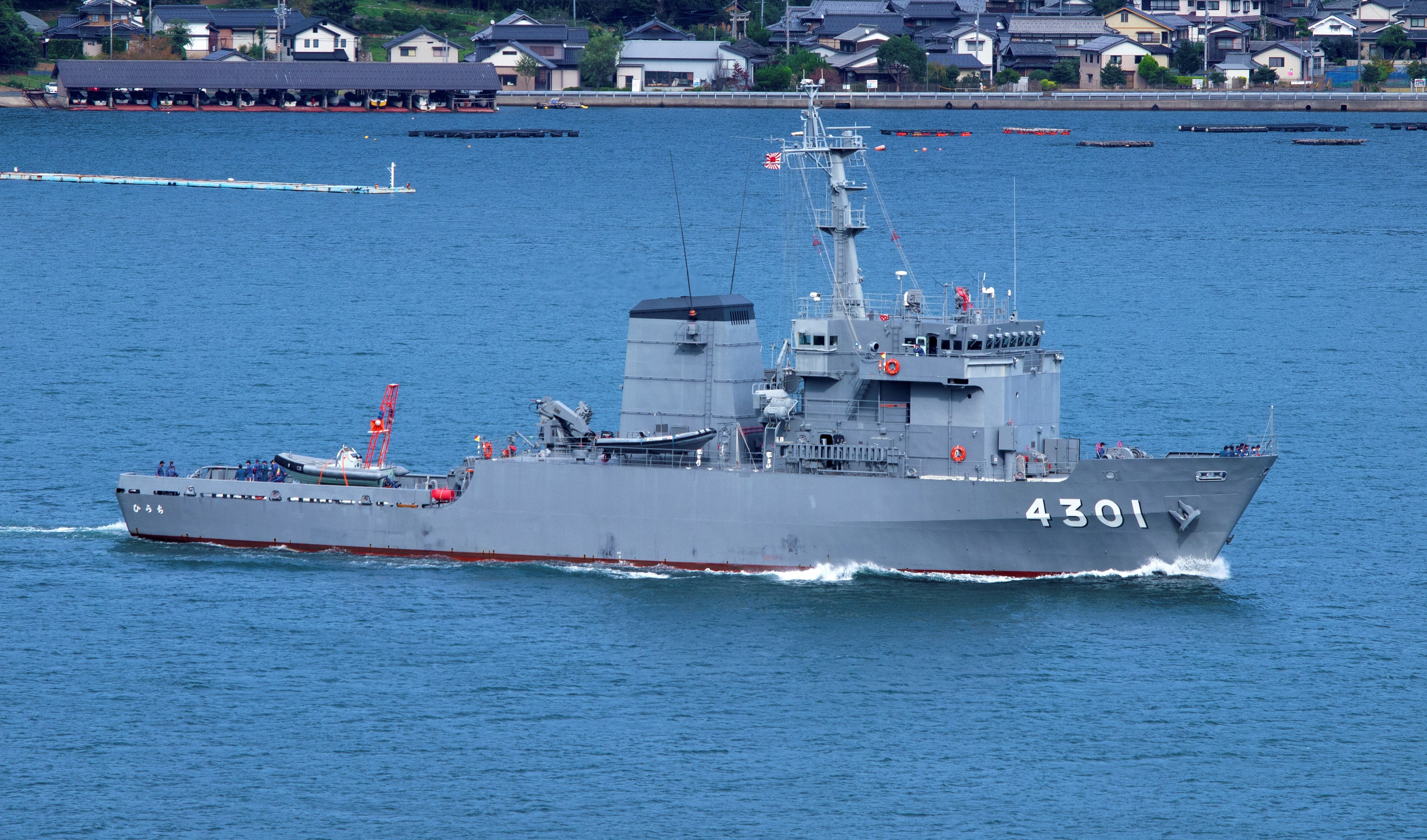

History

Japan
- Name: Hiuchi; (ひうち)
- Builder: Mitsui, Tamano
- Laid down: 18 January 2001
- Launched: 4 September 2001
- Commissioned: 27 March 2002
- Home port: Maizuru
- Identification: MMSI number: 431999656; Callsign: JSND
- Status: in active service

General characteristics
- Class & type: Hiuchi, Auxiliary Multi-purpose Support (AMS)
- Displacement: 980 long tons (1,000 t)
- Length: 65 m (213 ft)
- Beam: 12.0 m (39.4 ft)
- Height: 5.8 m (19 ft)
- Draft: 3.5 m (11 ft)
- Propulsion: Diesel
- Speed: 15 knots

JS Hiuchi is a Hiuchi class Auxiliary Multi-purpose Support (AMS) ship of the Japan Maritime Self-Defense Force (JMSDF).

The ship was built by Mitsui in Tamano and commissioned into service on 27 March 2002. The primary mission of the Hiuchi is to support training exercises of other ships, including shooting practice and torpedo launching practice.

== Service ==
This ship was one of several in the JMSDF fleet participating in disaster relief after the 2011 Tohoku earthquake and tsunami. Hiuchi was the first of two JMSDF ships which towed barges of fresh water from Yokosuka to the Fukushima I nuclear accidents. The water was used to replace the seawater being used in cooling efforts at the plant.
