= Kanadevia =

Japanese engineering company

Kanadevia Corporation カナデビア株式会社

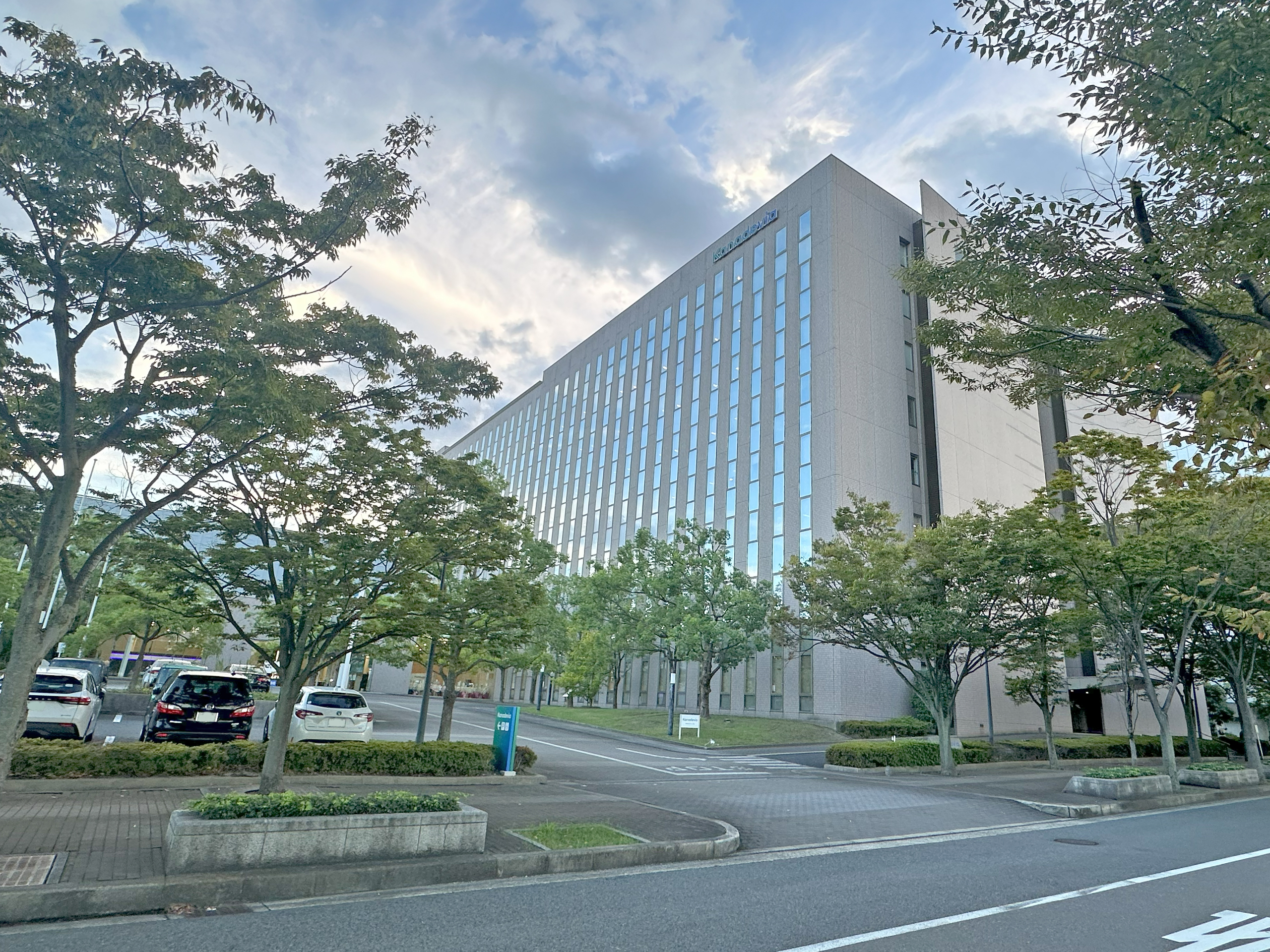
- Formerly: Osaka Iron Works (1881–1934); K.K. Nihon Sangyō Osaka Tekkoshō (1934–1943); Hitachi Zosen Corporation (1943–2024)
- Type: Public (K.K.)
- Traded as: TYO: 7004
- ISIN: JP3789000001
- Industry: Heavy Industry
- Founded: 1881; 145 years ago
- Founder: Edward H. Hunter
- Headquarters: Osaka, Japan
- Website: kanadevia.com

Kanadevia Corporation (Japanese: カナデビア株式会社, Hepburn: Kanadebia Kabushiki-kaisha), formerly Hitachi Zosen Corporation (日立造船株式会社, Hitachi Zōsen Kabushiki-kaisha), is a major Japanese industrial and engineering corporation. It produces waste treatment plants, industrial plants, precision machinery, industrial machinery, steel mill process equipment, steel structures, construction machinery, tunnel boring machines, marine engines, and power plants.

Despite its former name, Hitachi Zosen, of which the last word literally means shipbuilding, no longer builds ships, having spun off the business to Universal Shipbuilding Corporation in 2002, nor is it a keiretsu company of Hitachi any longer. Reflecting this, the company changed its name to Kanadevia in October 2024.

== History ==
Kanadevia's origins go back to April 1, 1881, when British entrepreneur Edward H. Hunter established Osaka Iron Works (大阪鉄工所, Ōsaka Tekkosho) in Osaka to develop the Japanese steel-making and shipbuilding industry. Hunter had come to Japan in 1865 and had established the Onohama Shipyard in Kobe before moving to Osaka and establishing a new shipyard at the junction of the Nakatsu and Aki rivers which could construct ships of under 1000 tons displacement. His first vessel, the Hatsumaru was launched in 1882. Hunter intended to build a company which was completely self-sufficient, and also produced engines, boilers, bridges and irrigation equipment.

An additional facility was established downstream on the Aji river at Sakurajima in 1900 to handle construction of vessels larger than 1000 tons. The first oil tanker built in Japan, the 531-ton Tora maru was launched in 1908, for Standard Oil Company.

Another shipyard was constructed at Innoshima, Hiroshima in 1911. Hunter changed his name to "Hanta" in 1915 after marrying a Japanese woman, and after transforming the company into a joint stock company, turned it over to his son, Ryutarō Hanta in 1915. The company continued to prosper, adding the Bingō Dockyard in 1919, Harada Shipbuilding Works in 1920, Hikojima Dockyard in 1924. Many of the iron bridges in Osaka and surrounding areas were designed and built by Osaka Iron Works. The company also began to expand into equipment for hydroelectric power plants in 1924.

The company was re-organized in 1934, coming under the overall control of the Nissan zaibatsu, and was renamed as K.K. Nihon Sangyō Osaka Tekkoshō.

While most of the lucrative contracts for naval warships for the Imperial Japanese Navy went to Osaka Iron Work's competitors, the company did build a large number of smaller auxiliary vessels such as minesweepers, landing craft, transport submarines and was involved in the conversion of old merchant ships for military use. Kanadevia also built the Kumano Maru, a transport aircraft carrier, at its Innoshima works in 1945. During World War II, the Osaka Iron Works expanded by opening a new shipyard at Kanagawa and acquiring the existing Mukaishima shipyard in 1943. It also changed its name to Hitachi Zosen Corporation in 1943.

After the surrender of Japan at the end of World War II, under the SCAP's economic democratization policy (dissolution of the zaibatsu and large business enterprises), the company was spun out from Hitachi, Ltd. in 1947. Since then Kanadevia has been independent from Hitachi or the Nissan Group although it is still a member of the Shunko-kai and Shunko Kowa-kai. Kanadevia quickly restarted operations as a builder of fishing vessels and coastal transports. By 1955, Kanadevia had emerged as one of the largest shipbuilders in Japan. The company also expanded into other markets. In 1957, as part of a technical cooperation with B&W Diesel in Denmark, Hitachi built the world's largest diesel engine. It also completed its first turn-key overseas plant project with the completion of a chemical fertilizer plant for India in 1964. In the shipbuilding field, Hitachi began to specialize in ever larger sizes of oil tankers, pioneering in methods for computer assisted design and modular, automated construction techniques. Hitachi acquired another shipyard, Maizuru Heavy Industries, in 1971 and opened a new shipyard at Ariake in Kyushu in 1973.

However, the global oil crisis of 1973 with its consequent reduction in ship demand resulted in financial difficulties for the company. Kanadevia, with over 50% of its revenues from ships was hard hit by the cancellation in orders for supertankers and attempted to survive by turning to oil rigs, oil storage facilities, and steel structures, pipes and bridges. However, with rising material costs and losses due to fixed price contracts, high overhead and redundant facilities meant that the company had to restructure from the 1980s. By 1988, the company employed only 5,596 workers, down from 24,660 ten years earlier.

The company also made strong efforts to diversify away from the shipbuilding roots, expanding especially into industrial and municipal waste disposal facilities. However, its boldest move was in October 2002, when it sold its shipbuilding operations to a new joint venture with NKK Corporation (now JFE Holdings) called Universal Shipbuilding Corporation (now called Japan Marine United).

In March 2021, Hitachi Zosen unveiled a solid-state battery with a capacity of 1000mAh, which the company reckoned is the world's highest in its kind.

In February 2024, Japanese Secretary of State Yoko Kamikawa stated that a recent decision by the South Korean government to authorize the transfer of money from Hitatchi Zosen to a South Korean plaintiff who sued for compensation based on the issue of labor from the era of Japan's 1910 to 1945 colonial rule over the Korean Peninsula left the company at an "unreasonable disadvantage." The compensation payment was based on a ruling from the South Korean Supreme Court in December 2023.

On October 1, 2024, the company changed its name to Kanadevia Corporation.
