= Keihin region =

Industrial region in Kantō, Japan

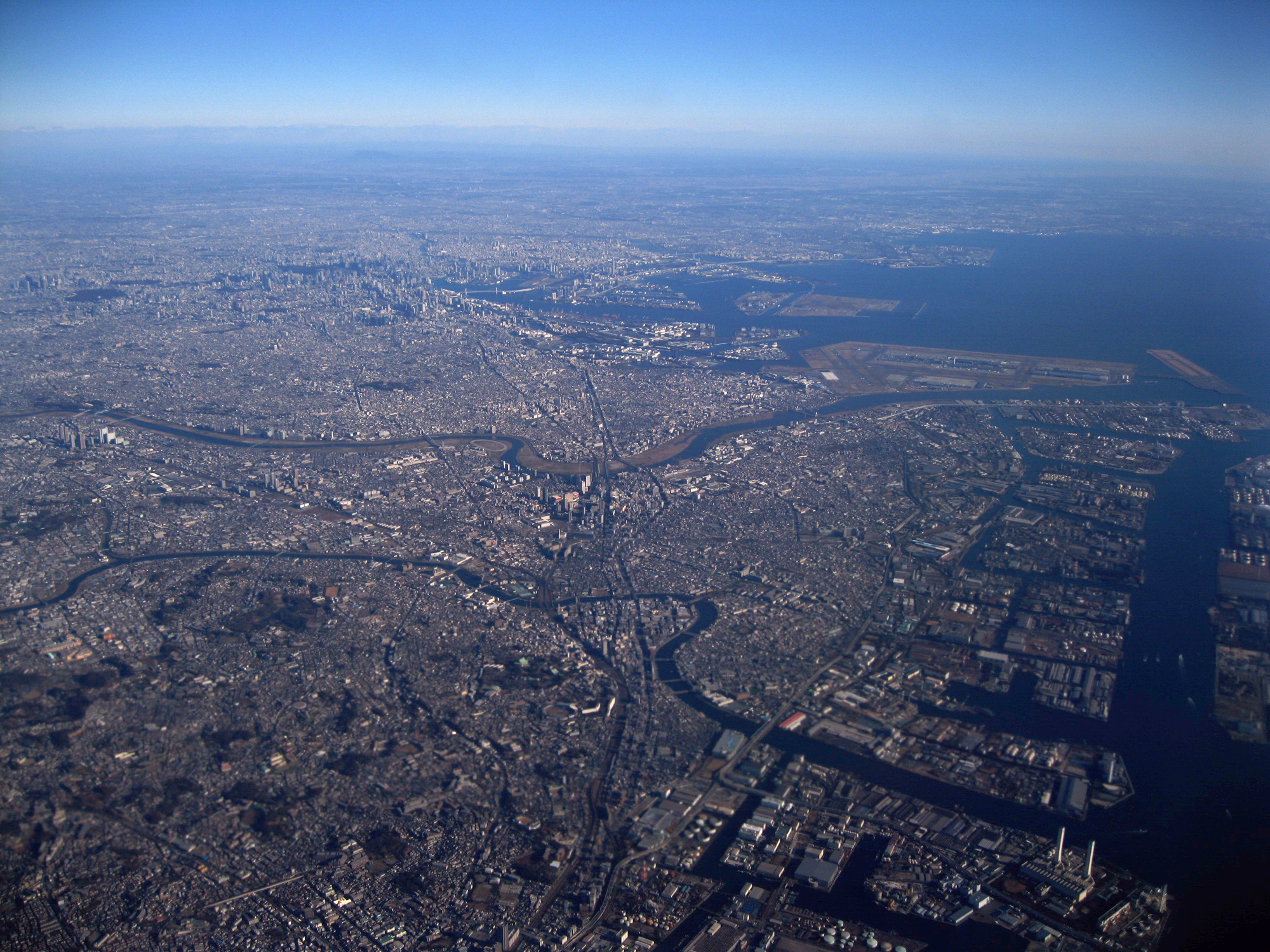
Aerial view of the Keihin Region (right side)

The Keihin region (京浜地方, Keihin Chihō) is a region and industrial region of Japan, centered on Tokyo, which forms the core of the Pacific Belt. It mainly extends across Ōta Ward in Tokyo, Kawasaki City and Yokohama City in Kanagawa Prefecture, southern Saitama Prefecture, and the six cities of Tōkatsu in Chiba Prefecture. Sometimes, the entirety of Kanagawa Prefecture is considered to be part of Keihin.

As one of Japan's leading industrial areas, it used to generate the largest production value in the country; in recent years, it has overtaken production in the Chūkyō industrial zone and the Hanshin Industrial Zone. Together, they are the three major industrial zones.

The Keihin region is part of the larger Kantō region.

== See also ==
- Keihanshin
- Keihin Electric Express Railway
- Keihin-Tōhoku Railway Line
- Keihin Ferry Boat
- List of regions of Japan
- Japan
