= Shimokita =

Shimokita may refer to:

- Shimokita District, Aomori
- Shimokita Peninsula
- JDS Shimokita, a Japanese ship
- JS Shimokita, a ship operated by the Japan Maritime Self-Defense Force
- Shimokita (train), a train service in Japan
- Shimokitazawa, a neighborhood of Tokyo
