= JS Ōsumi =

Ōsumi-class tank landing ship of the JMSDF

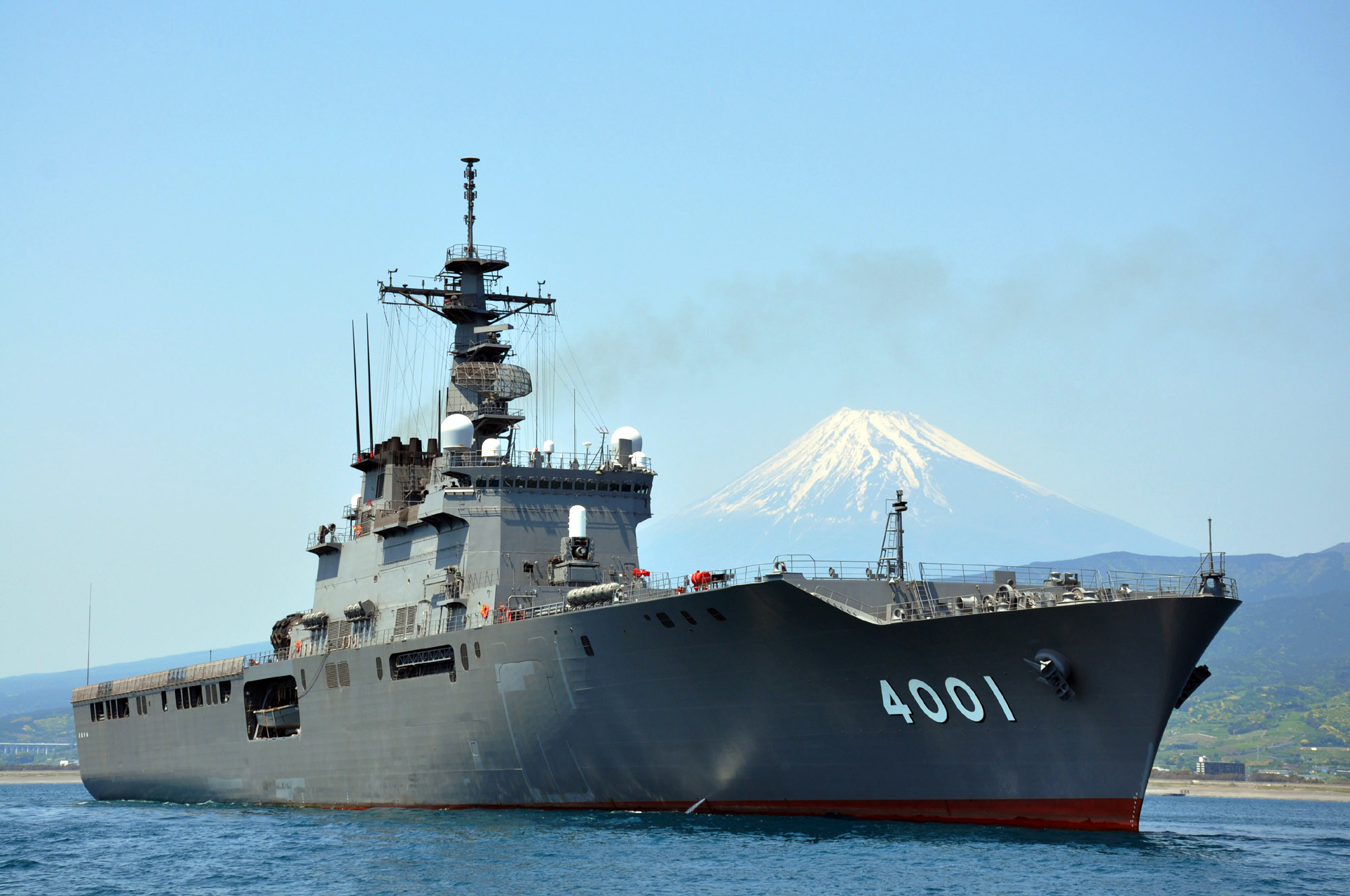
- JS Ōsumi

History

Japan
- Name: Ōsumi; (おおすみ)
- Namesake: Ōsumi Peninsula
- Ordered: 1993
- Builder: Mitsui, Tamano
- Laid down: 6 December 1995
- Launched: 18 November 1996
- Commissioned: 11 March 1998
- Home port: Kure
- Identification: Pennant number: LST-4001
- Status: Active

General characteristics
- Class & type: Ōsumi-class tank landing ship
- Displacement: 8,900 t (8,800 long tons) standard; 13,000 t (13,000 long tons) full load
- Length: 178 m (584 ft 0 in)
- Beam: 25.8 m (84 ft 8 in)
- Draught: 17.0 m (55 ft 9 in)
- Propulsion: 2 × Mitsui 16V42M-A Diesel, 26,000 bhp (19,000 kW)); 2 shafts; 1 × bow thruster
- Speed: 22 knots (41 km/h; 25 mph)
- Boats & landing craft carried: 2 × Landing Craft Air Cushion (LCAC)
- Capacity: up to 10 main battle tanks
- Troops: 330 personnel
- Complement: 137
- Sensors & processing systems: OPS-14C air search radar; OPS-28D surface-search radar; OPS-20 navigation radar; TACAN
- Electronic warfare & decoys: 4 × Mark 36 SRBOC
- Armament: 2 × 20 mm Phalanx CIWS; 2 × M2 Browning machine gun
- Aircraft carried: Up to 8 helicopters tied topside
- Aviation facilities: Hangar and helipad

JS Ōsumi (LST-4001) is the lead ship of the Ōsumi-class tank landing ships of the Japan Maritime Self-Defense Force (JMSDF).

== Construction and career ==
Ōsumi was laid down on 6 December 1995 and launched on 18 November 1996 by Mitsui Engineering & Shipbuilding, Tamano. She was commissioned into the 1st Landing Group on 11 March 1998.

Initially, the ship was not equipped with a fin stabilizer (rolling prevention device) that improves stability during open sea voyages and helicopter takeoffs and landings due to political judgment, and in 2006, eight years after commissioning, international emergency assistance was provided. The stabilizer installation cost was finally budgeted by the Defense Agency (currently the Ministry of Defense) as a repair cost for a large transport ship to respond to the activity, and at the same time the capacity of aviation fuel was increased. It was also equipped with a tactical air navigation system (TACAN), which was not available at the time of commissioning.

The vessel departed Kobe with Bungo and Tokiwa on 23 September 1999 to transport temporary housing as an aid to the damage caused by the northwestern Turkey earthquake that occurred on 17 August. The first long-distance continuous voyage in the history of the Maritime Self-Defense Force was carried out to Alexandria at an average speed of 18 knots (33 km/h; 21 mph) for 23 consecutive days without calling, and arrived at the port of Heidalpasha in Istanbul on 19 October. The return trip was scheduled to arrive at Kure on 22 November, but an issue that arose aboard Bungo delayed their arrival by one day. They arrived at Sasebo on the 22nd.

From 26 to 28 January 2010, special transportation training was conducted at Sasebo and the waters west of Kyushu together with Kunisaki and USS Tortuga.

This ship delivered supplies to the disaster area after the 2011 Tohoku earthquake and tsunami.

From June to July 2012, she participated in the Pacific Partnership 2012, visited the Philippines and Vietnam, and engaged in medical activities and cultural exchanges. An international emergency relief team was formed to rescue the damage caused by Typhoon Haiyan that struck the Philippines on 8 November 2013, the same year, and was dispatched along with JS Ise and the supply ship JS Towada (Sankai Operation). She left Kure on 18 November, arrived in Leyte Gulf on 22 November, carried out relief supplies transportation, medical care, and epidemic prevention activities, and returned to Japan on 20 December. In addition, Ōsumi was scheduled to participate in training for the defense of remote islands around Okinawa, but was redirected to provide support. The training was planned to be attended by 34,000 people, and Ōsumi was planned to be a base in the training area. The remote island defense training itself was canceled due to the dropout of Ōsumi.

On 15 January 2014, while en route from departure from Kure towards the Mitsui Tamano Shipyard for scheduled maintenance, Ōsumi was abnormally approached by the fishing boat Yugyosen, which tried to cross the tank landing ship a reckless route. Ōsumi repeatedly warned the fishing boat, slowed down but still collided with Yugyosen. The fishing boat capsized, four people on board were thrown into the sea and rescued by the Ōsumi's crew, but two of them, the captain of the fishing boat and the angler died. On 16 May 2015, it was reported that Ōsumi was off Kyushu and was among Japanese naval assets operating with US Navy vessels and the French Navy conducting joint training. Ōsumi sailed with the French Dixmude and Aconit. Mutual embarkation training (cross-deck) was conducted with Dixmude.

For nine days, beginning on 5 May 2018, Ōsumi participated in multilateral joint training on humanitarian assistance and disaster relief organization with the Indonesian Navy off Lombok island. After that, from 22 May to 2 June, she called at Cam Ranh, Vietnam and participated in the activities of Pacific Partnership 2018. On 11 July the ship transported emergency supplies that Yokosuka City decided to provide in response to Kure City's request based on the mutual support agreement in the event of a disaster between the four former military port citiesand supplies requested by the Kure District General Manager to the Yokosuka District General Manager and arrived in Kure on the. In addition, the bathing facility on the ship was opened for the Ground Self-Defense Force members. On 26 and 27 August, Ōsumi conducted joint training with USS Wasp and several other ships in the waters around Okinawa. From 5 to 19 October, Ōsumi took part in Japan–US joint training that was conducted in Tanegashima, Kagoshima Prefecture and the surrounding sea and airspace.

In 2021, Ōsumi, alongside the warships JS Ise, JS Ashigara, JS Asahi, JS Kongō, JS Otaka, JS Shirataka and other Japanese naval elements, took part in a 17-day joint training in the East China Sea, with the United States, Australia, and France.

On Sunday, August 24, 2025, Ōsumi docked at Pier 1701, Tanjung Priok, Jakarta, to take part in the Super Garuda Shield 2025 exercise. The exercise was held in Java and Sumatra together with several other countries, including Indonesia, the United States, Australia, Canada, the United Kingdom, Brazil, South Korea, the Netherlands, New Zealand, Singapore, Germany, and France.

== Gallery ==
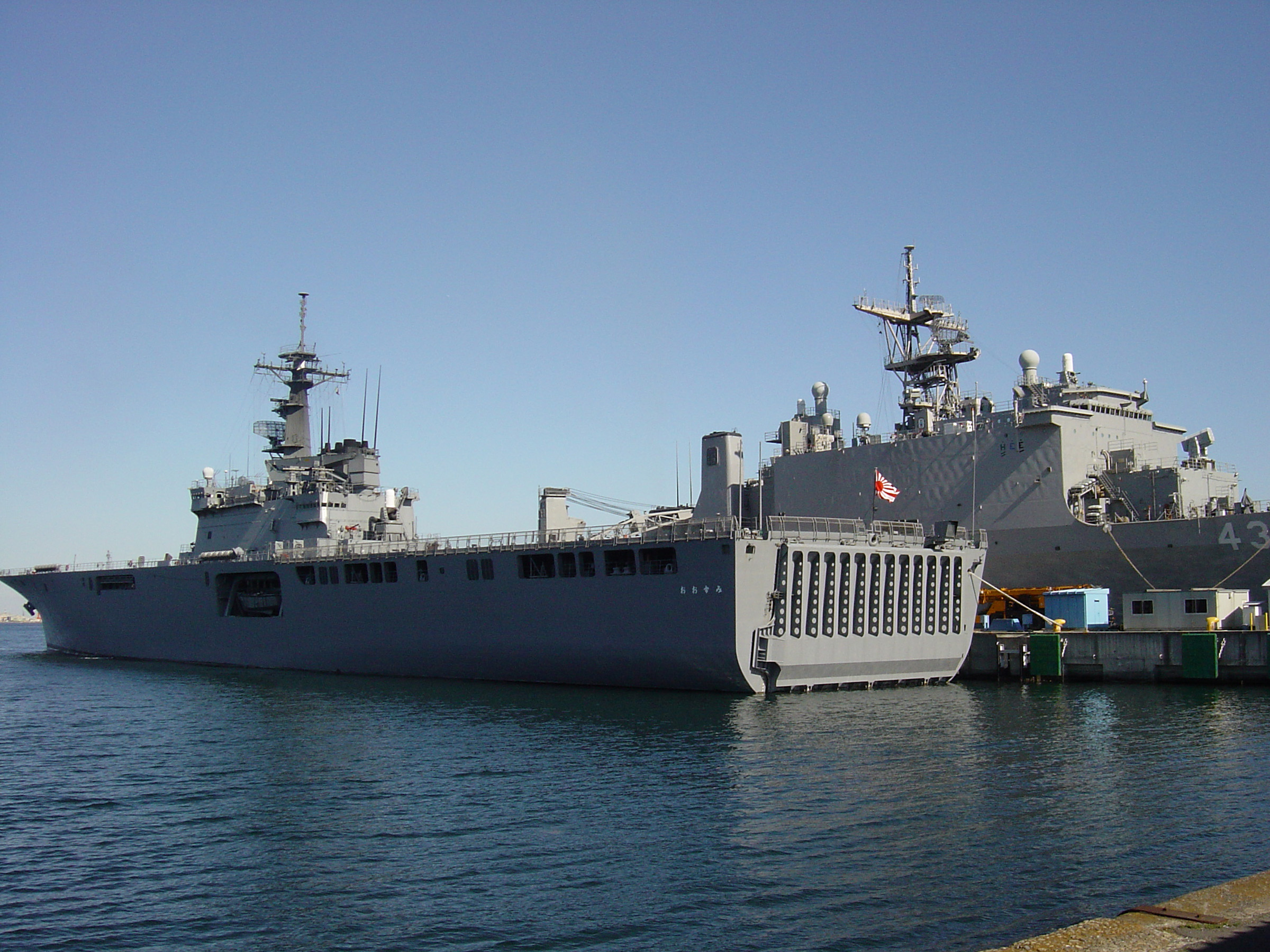
JS Ōsumi and USS Fort McHenry on 5 February 2006

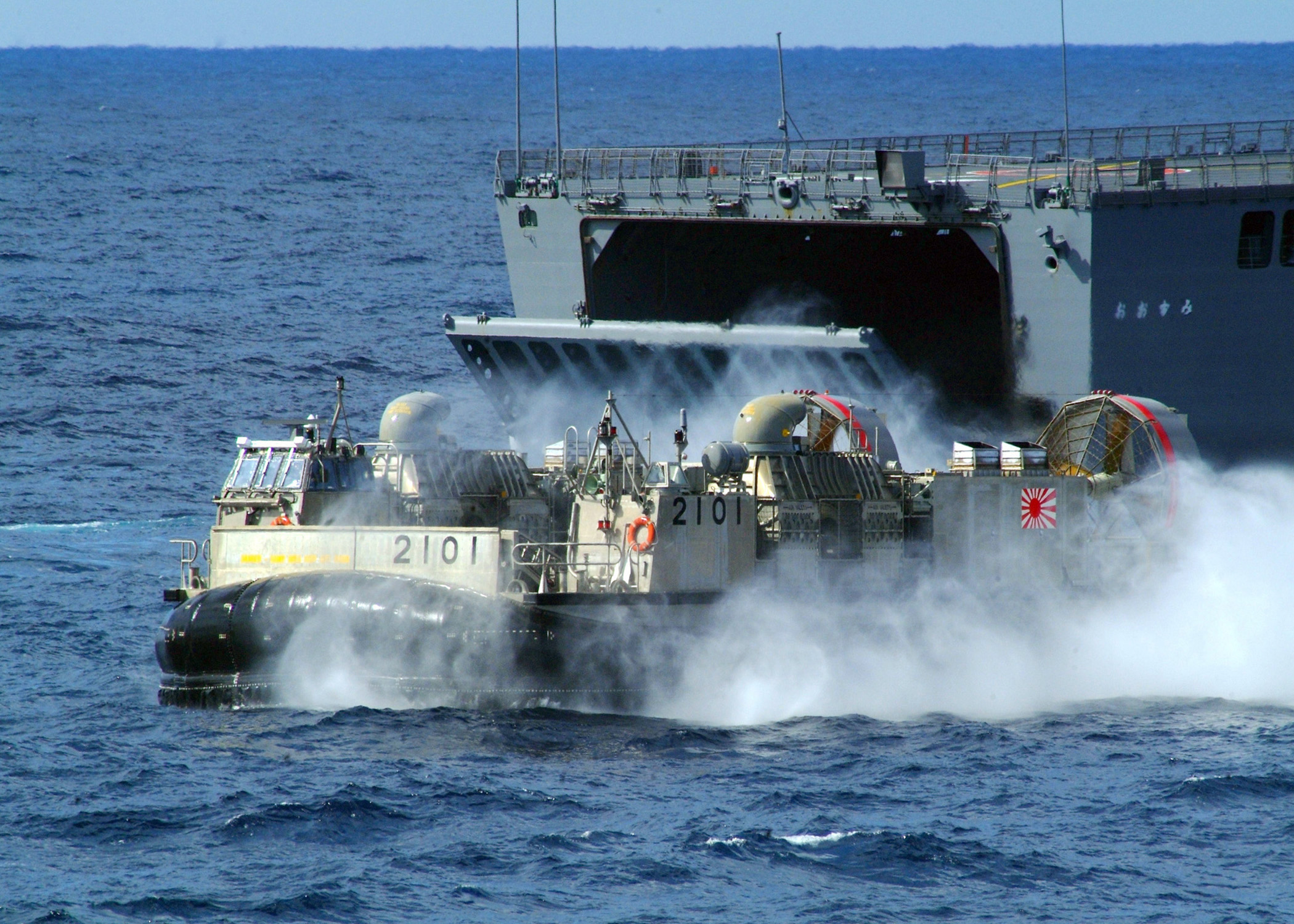
JS Ōsumi on 7 March 2007

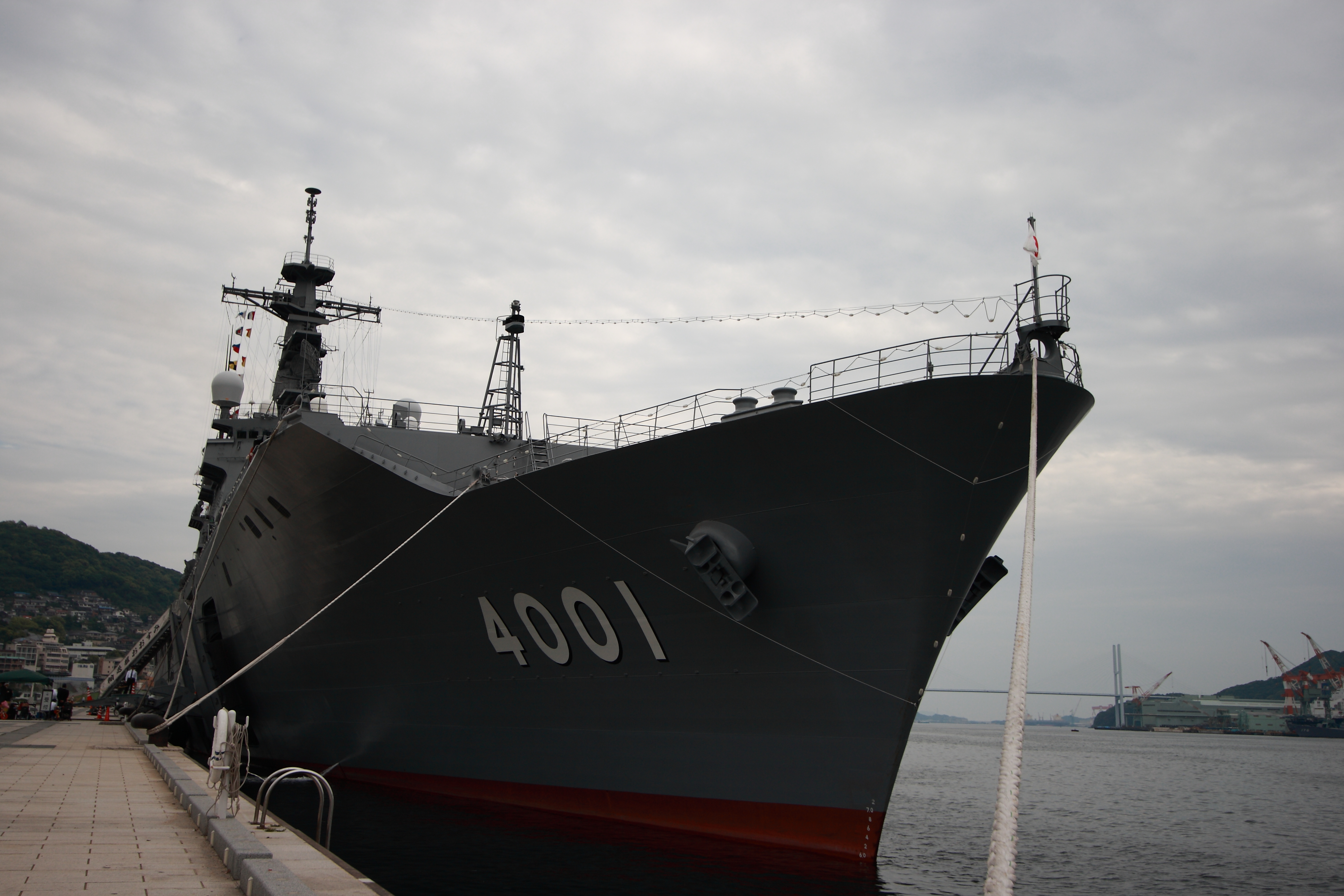
JS Ōsumi on 9 May 2010

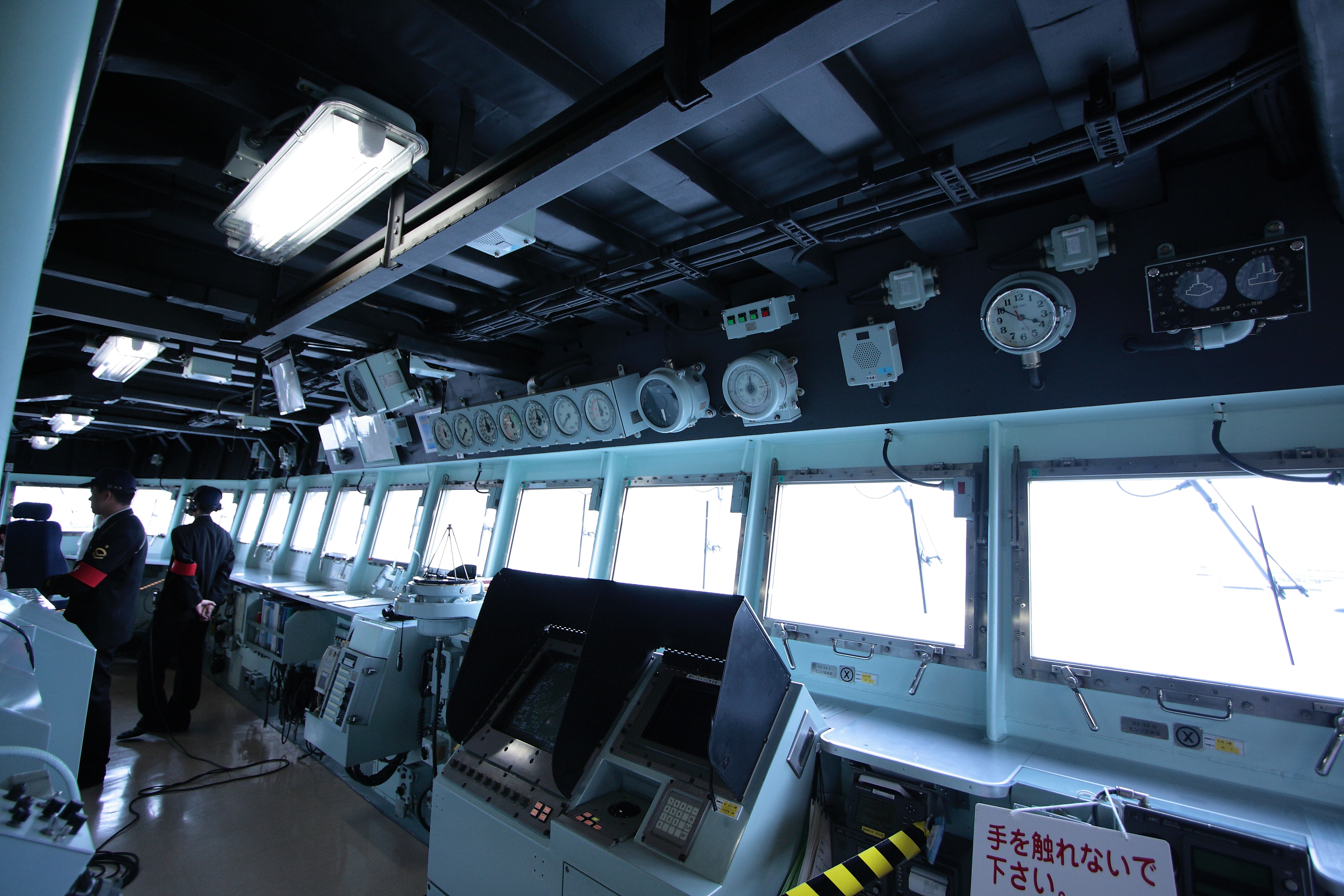
JS Ōsumi's bridge on 9 May 2010

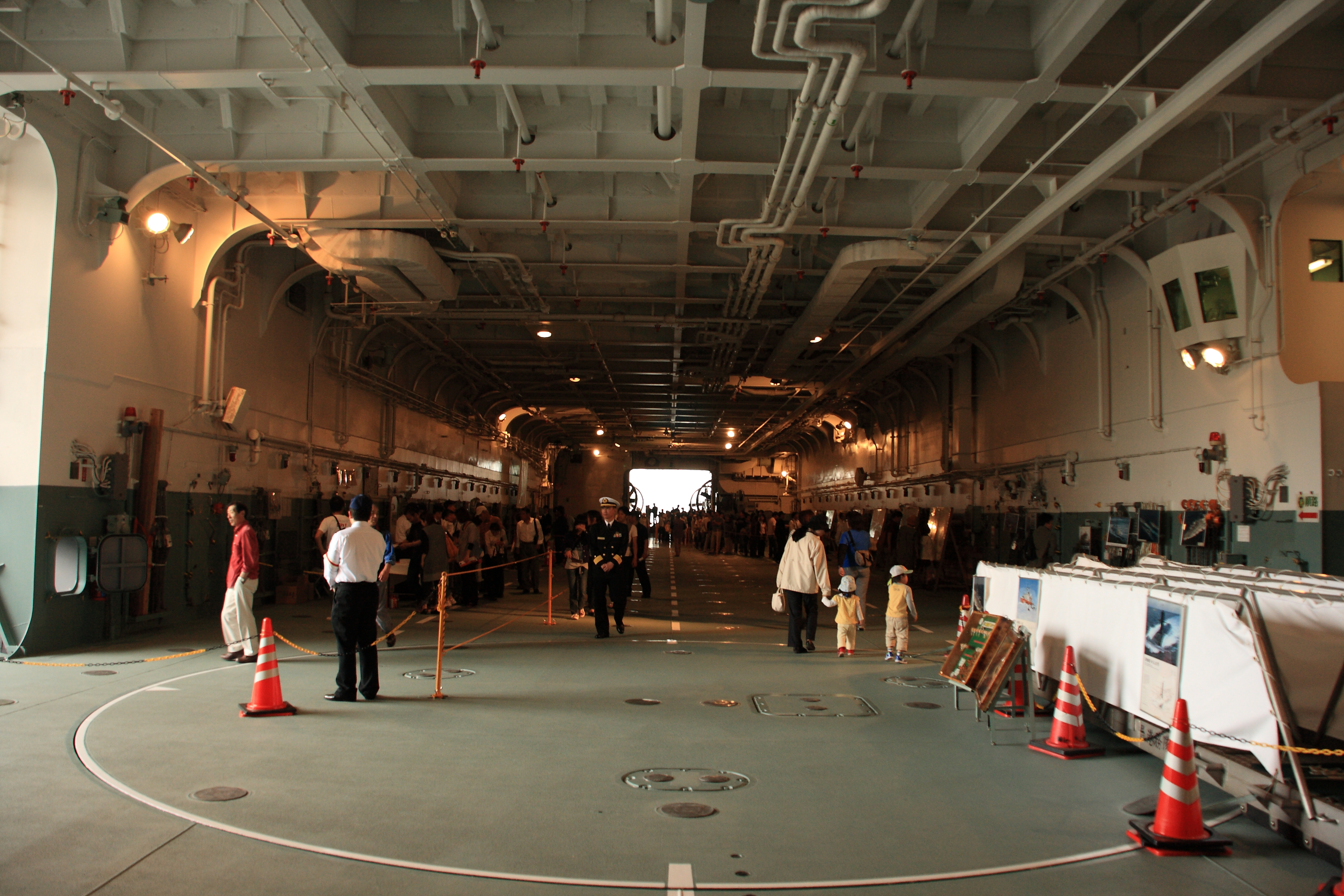
JS Ōsumi's hangar deck on 9 May 2010

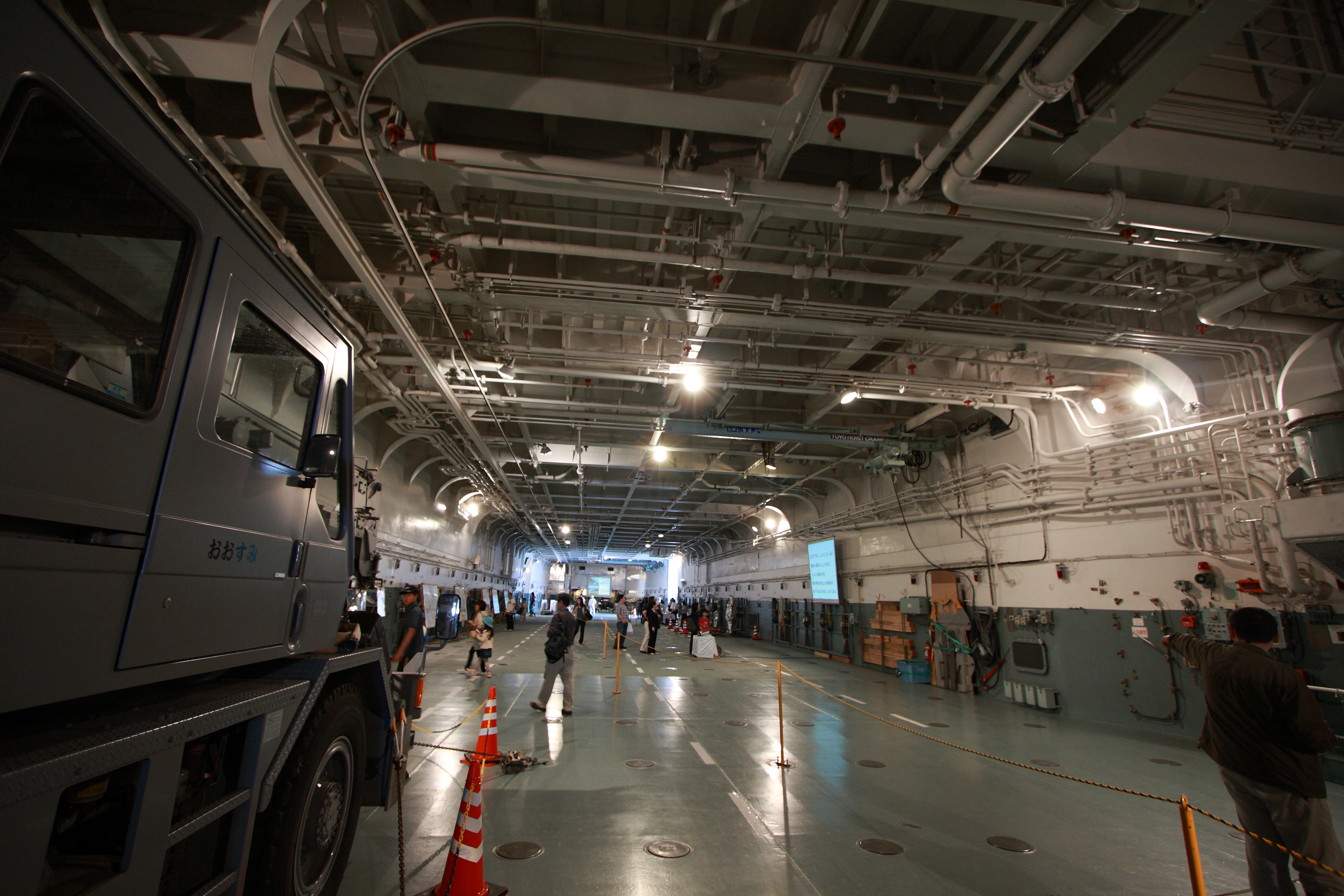

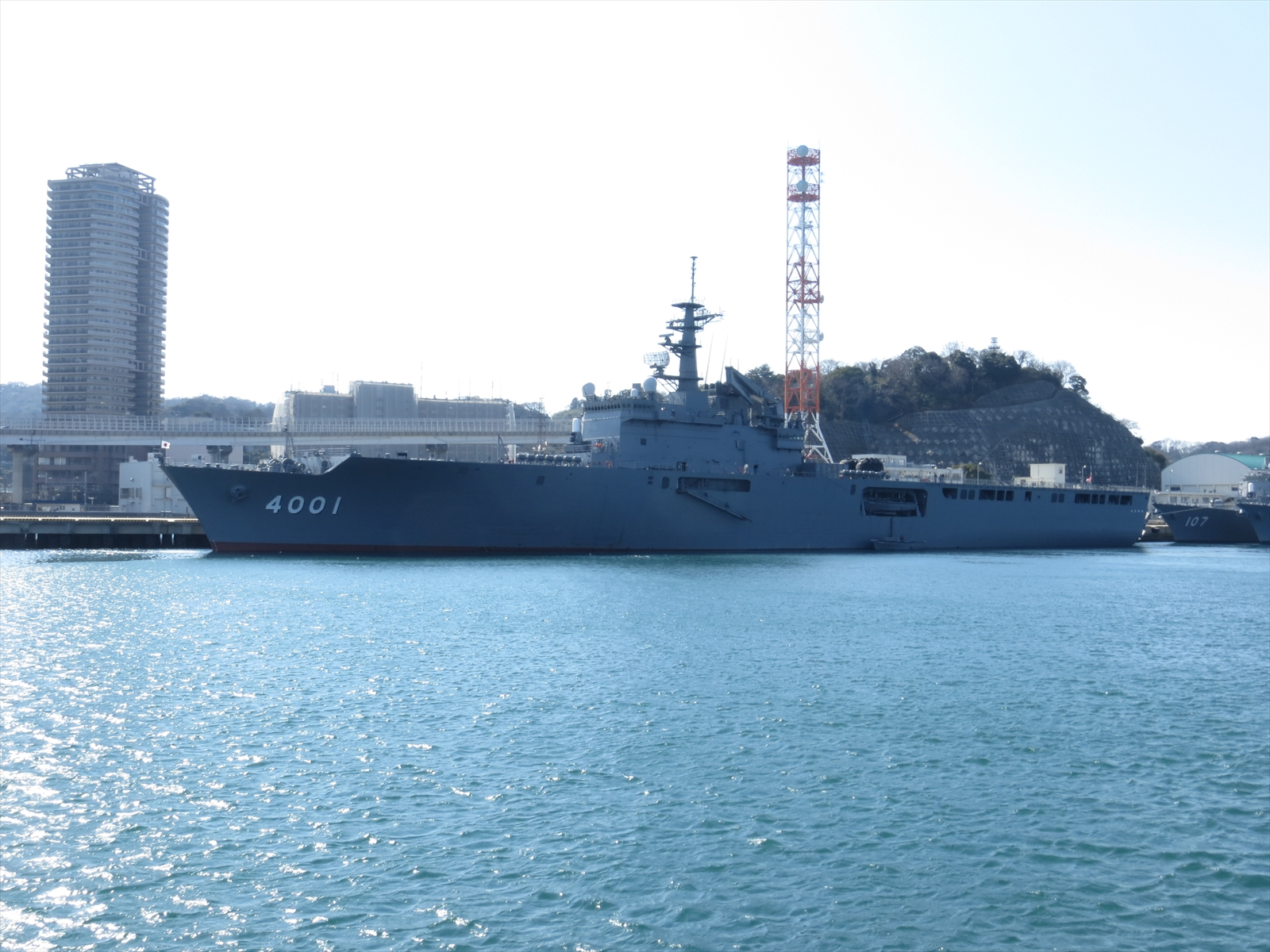
JS Ōsumi at Yokosuka on 12 March 2015

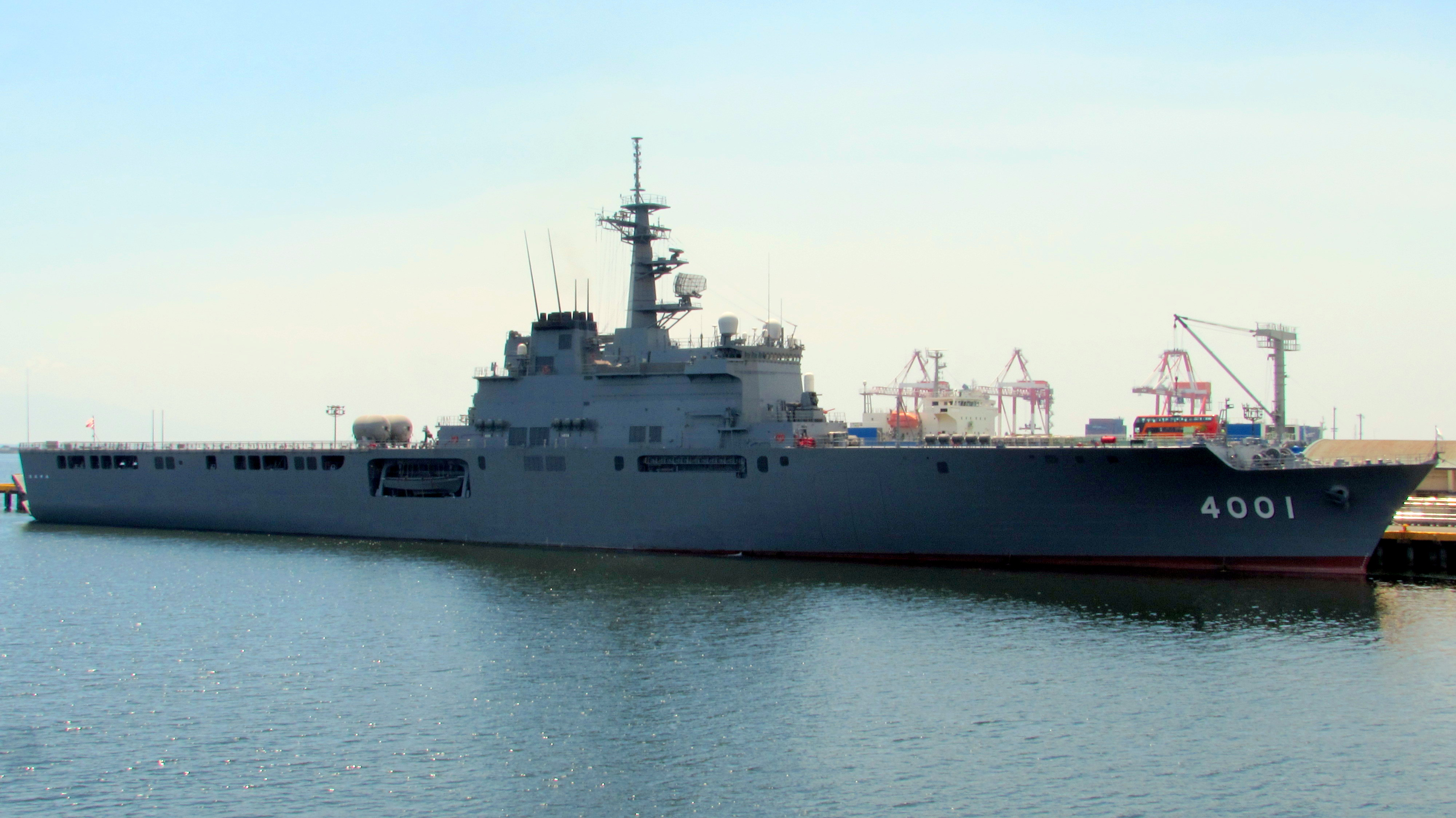
JS Ōsumi in Manila on 27 April 2018

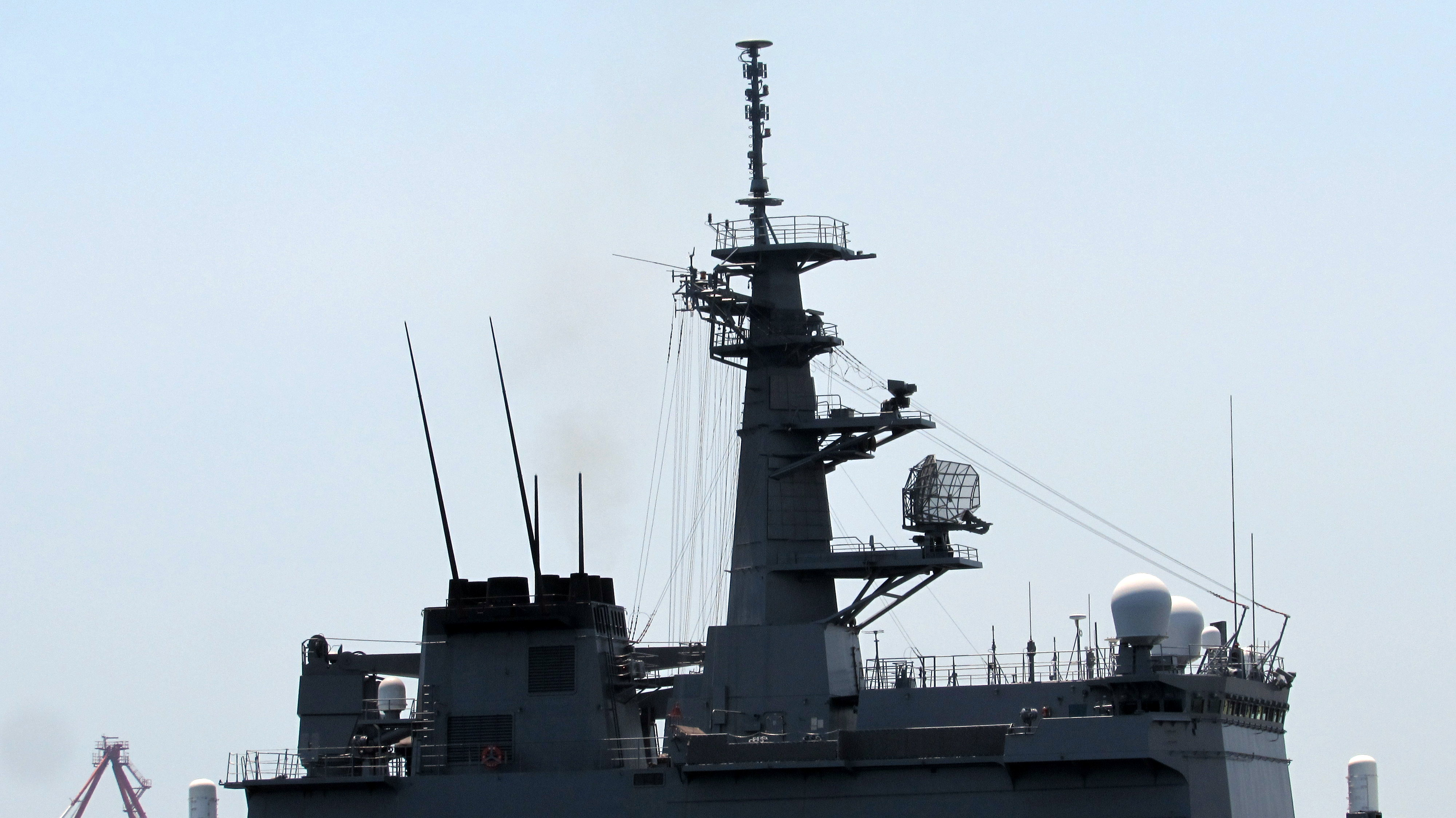
