= Japanese ship Shimokita =

Several ships of the Japan Maritime Self-Defense Force have been named Shimokita:

- JDS Shimokita (LST-4002) (1961), ex-US LST-835 acquired by Japan in 1961. Later sold to the Philippine Navy
- JS Shimokita (LST-4002), a tank landing ship commissioned in 2002
