= Ōsumi-class tank landing ship =

Japanese tank landing ship class

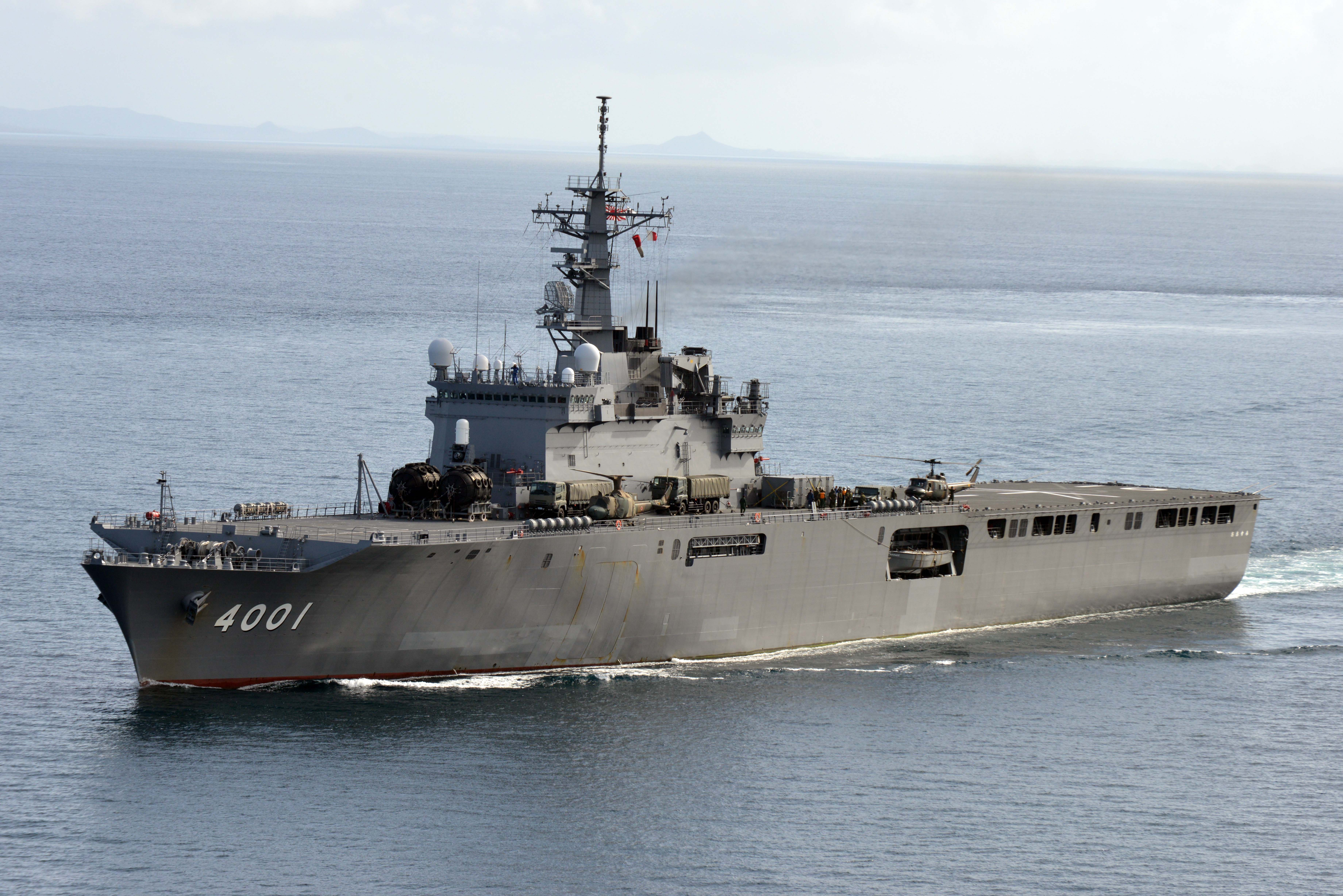
- JS Ōsumi

Class overview
- Builders: Mitsui, Tamano; Hitachi, Maizuru
- Operators: Japan Maritime Self-Defense Force
- Preceded by: Miura class
- Built: 1993–1999
- In commission: 1998–present
- Planned: 3
- Completed: 3
- Active: 3

General characteristics
- Type: Tank landing ship
- Displacement: 8,900 t (8,800 long tons) standard; 13,000 t (13,000 long tons) full load
- Length: 178 m (584 ft 0 in)
- Beam: 25.8 m (84 ft 8 in)
- Draught: 17.0 m (55 ft 9 in)
- Propulsion: 2 × Mitsui 16V42M-A Diesel, 26,000 bhp (19,000 kW)); 2 shafts; 1 × bow thruster
- Speed: 22 knots (41 km/h; 25 mph)
- Boats & landing craft carried: 2 × Landing Craft Air Cushion (LCAC)
- Capacity: up to 10 main battle tanks
- Troops: 330 personnel
- Complement: 137
- Sensors & processing systems: OPS-14C air search radar; OPS-28D surface-search radar; OPS-20 navigation radar; TACAN
- Electronic warfare & decoys: 4 × Mark 36 SRBOC
- Armament: 2 × 20 mm Phalanx CIWS; 2 × M2 Browning machine gun
- Aircraft carried: Up to 8 helicopters tied topside
- Aviation facilities: Hangar and helipad

The Ōsumi class (おおすみ型輸送艦), is a Japanese tank landing ship. The class is also known as the Oosumi class. While the Japan Maritime Self-Defense Force (JMSDF) describes the Ōsumi class as tank landing ships (LSTs), they lack the bow doors and beaching capability traditionally associated with LSTs. Functionally, their well deck makes the Ōsumi class more like a dock landing ship (LSD).

As of 2024 there are three Ōsumi vessels active with the Japanese Maritime Self-Defence Force.

== Design and specifications ==
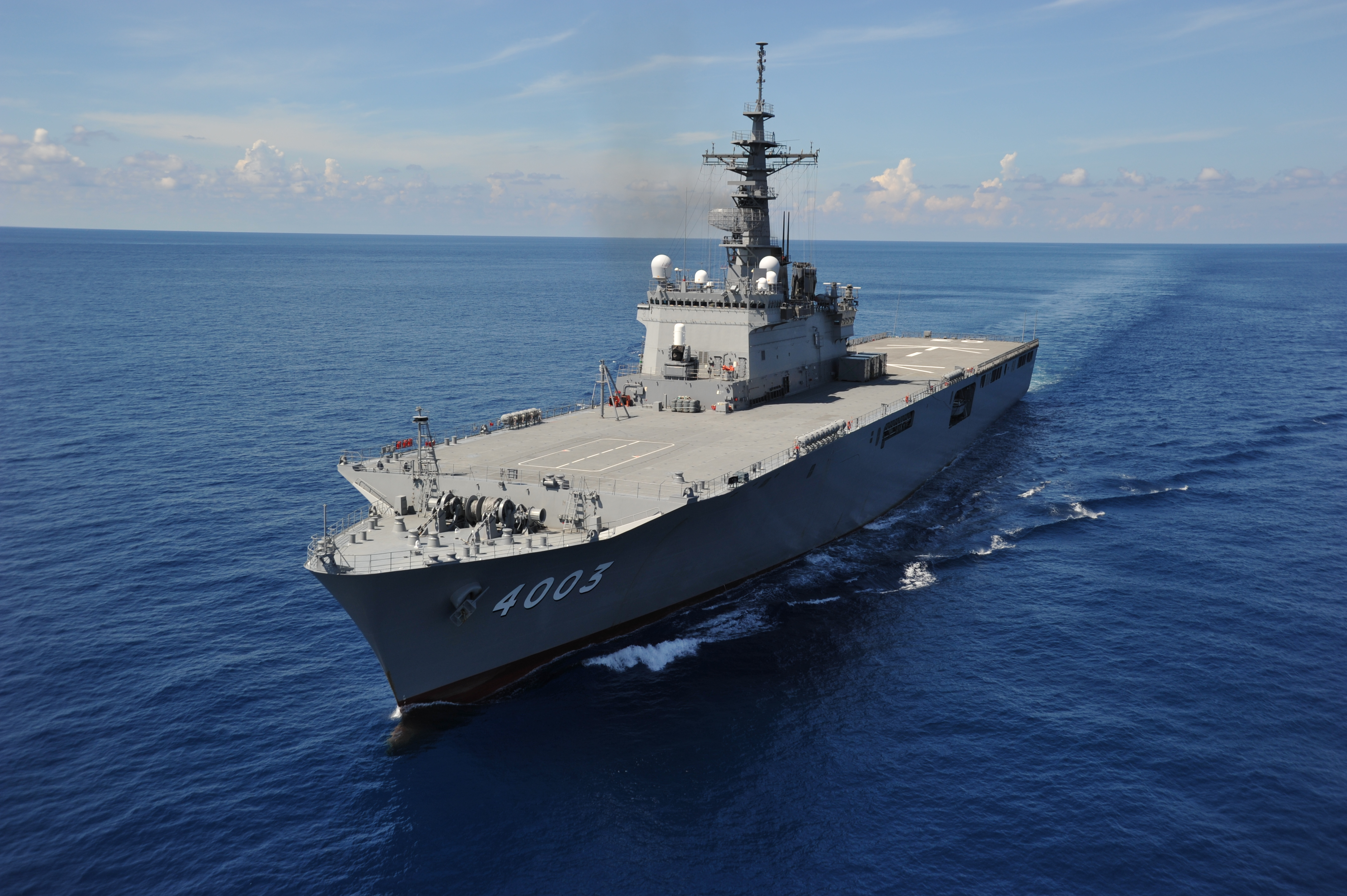
Bow view of Kunisaki

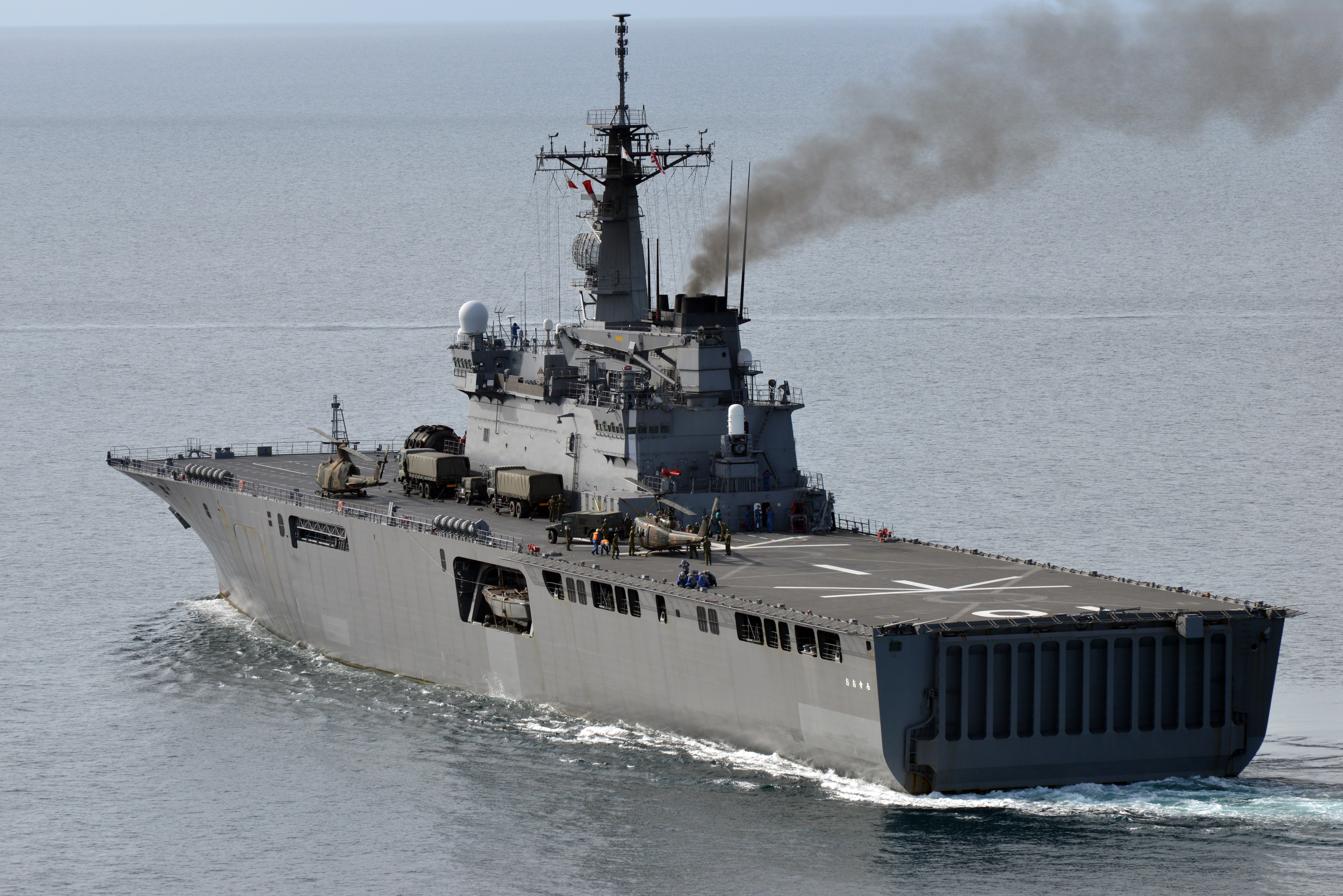
Stern view of Ōsumi

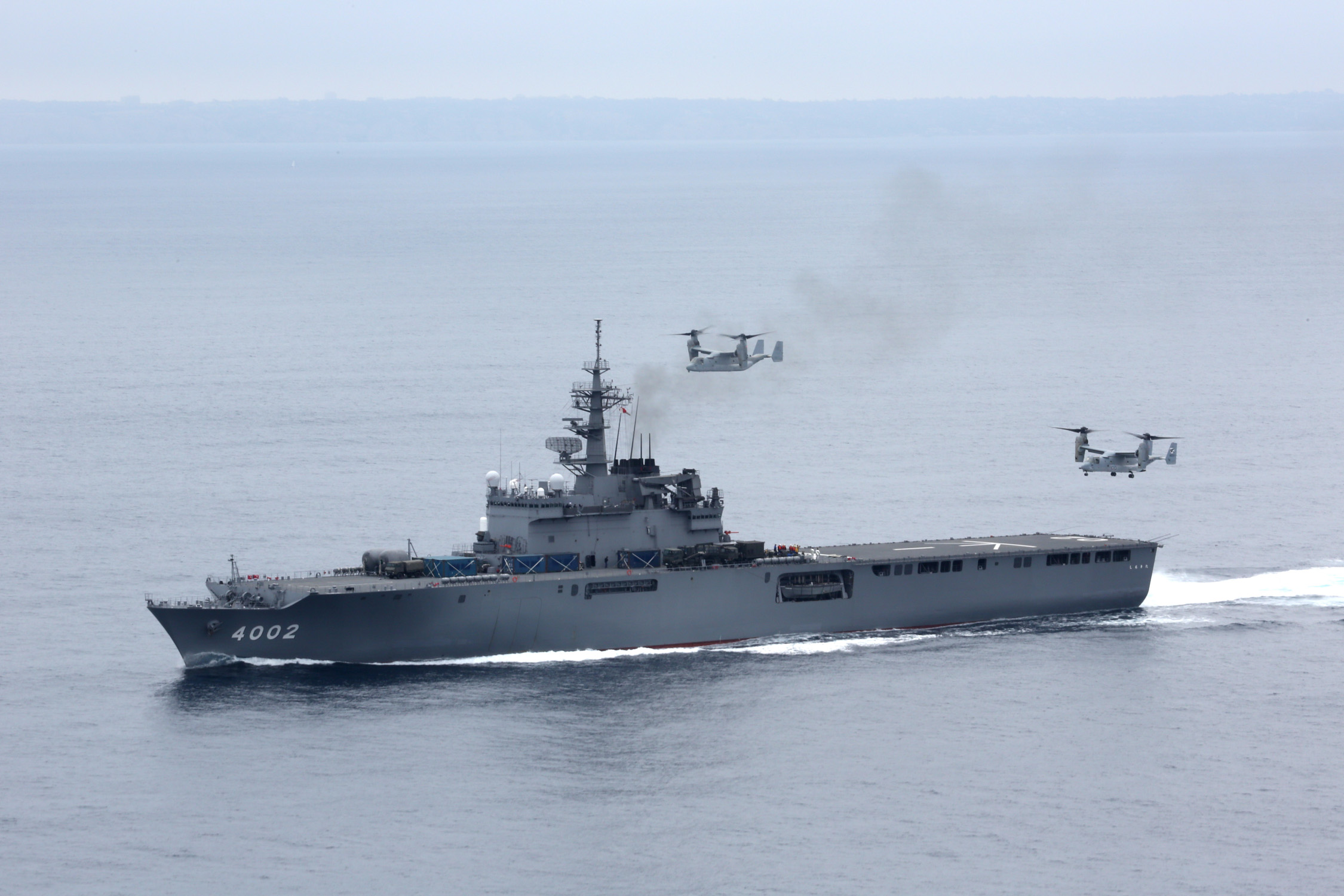
MV-22B landing aboard Shimokita

GlobalSecurity.org noted in its report on the Ōsumi class that "the program originated in a proposal for a small carrier for defensive and mine countermeasures (MCM) purposes, but this was deemed politically unacceptable, and the project was reworked as an amphibious ship" (actually a "Maritime Operational Transport", see below). Later the JMSDF returned to the idea with helicopter carriers with the larger Hyūga class.

The Ōsumi class increases its carrying capacity with a flat-top open air upper vehicle parking deck, it has an elevated island superstructure offset to starboard giving the appearance of a small aircraft carrier though the helicopter flight deck only comprises the stern of the ship. Small deck elevators accessing the enclosed lower parking deck are for vehicles rather than helicopters, the lower vehicle deck has access to the well deck. There is no enclosed aircraft hangar and any helicopters are tied down topside.

The MSDF developed the Maritime Operational Transport concept as an alternative to what was then (mid-1990s) the politically denied development of an amphibious doctrine. This concept is intended to "deliver JGSDF reinforcement units to an area where an enemy landing is possible or probable, or where an enemy has already landed but that is still under Japanese control. The point is that the landings would be on Japanese territory, not foreign soil. So, in theory, this concept does not involve amphibious assault. The tempo of helicopter transport and the types of helicopters required would be very different from those in an assault amphibious landing."

The Ōsumis gives the JMSDF a modest lift capability, especially in defense of the outer islands. The Ōsumi class enables the transport of ground troops to strategic locations, and the rescue of civilians in case of large scale natural disaster. The hull features armored and opening deck. The rear of hull houses an armored landing deck for two large CH-47 helicopters. The well dock in the rear of the ship houses the two Landing Craft Air Cushion (LCAC) hovercraft. Forward, there is a 100 m (328 ft 1 in) deck below the main deck, but the single elevator accessing these spaces is too small for anything but a small helicopter. A VSTOL aircraft or a larger helicopter will simply not fit on the elevator. These spaces below the forward main deck are used primarily for vehicle storage so those fighting and/or armored vehicles can access the well deck.

== Ships in the class ==
| Pennant No. | Name | Home port | Unit | Shipyard | Plan | Laid down | Launched | Commissioned | Status |
|---|---|---|---|---|---|---|---|---|---|
| LST 4001 | Ōsumi | Kure | Landing Div 1 | Mitsui, Tamano | 1993 | 6 December 1995 | 18 November 1996 | 11 March 1998 | In service |
| LST 4002 | Shimokita | Kure | Landing Div 1 | Mitsui, Tamano | 1998 | 30 November 1999 | 29 November 2000 | 12 March 2002 | In service |
| LST 4003 | Kunisaki | Kure | Landing Div 1 | Hitachi, Maizuru | 1999 | 7 September 2000 | 13 December 2001 | 26 February 2003 | In service |

== Service history ==
At least two members of the class, Ōsumi and Kunisaki, participated in search and rescue and other disaster relief operations in the aftermath of the 2011 Tōhoku earthquake and tsunami.

In January 2014, The Japanese Ministry of Defence (MoD) confirmed reports that it will perform a major refit Ōsumi-class tank landing ships to embark MV-22 Ospreys, and Assault Amphibious Vehicles (AAV7s) to improve their amphibious capabilities. The MoD allocated JPY20 million (US$190,000) in its fiscal year 2014 budget to conduct research on the refit.

In 2014, Japanese Defense Minister Itsunori Onodera expressed the intention of buying one amphibious assault ship from the United States to provide more amphibious capabilities than the current Ōsumi class. A Wasp-class amphibious assault ship was most likely candidate for acquisition. However, that acquisition did not move forward.

In the interim, the Ōsumi class have been modestly upgraded to be able to land Boeing MV-22s, which began delivery to the Japanese military in 2020, and also to carry the AAV7A1 Amphibious Assault Vehicles.

In August 2026, Kunisaki was deployed to help fight forest fires in Indonesia.

== Gallery ==
Ōsumi class

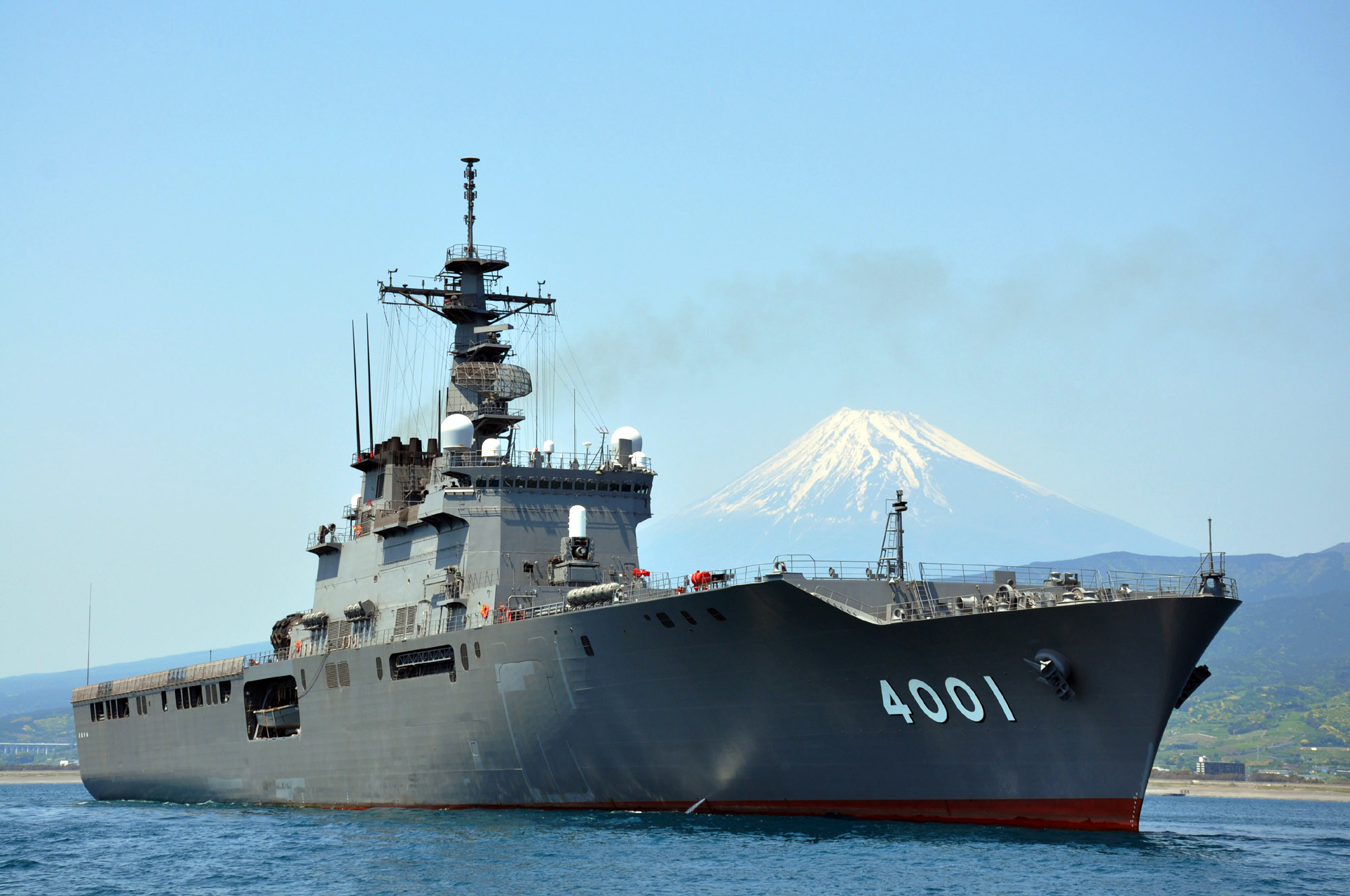
JS Ōsumi

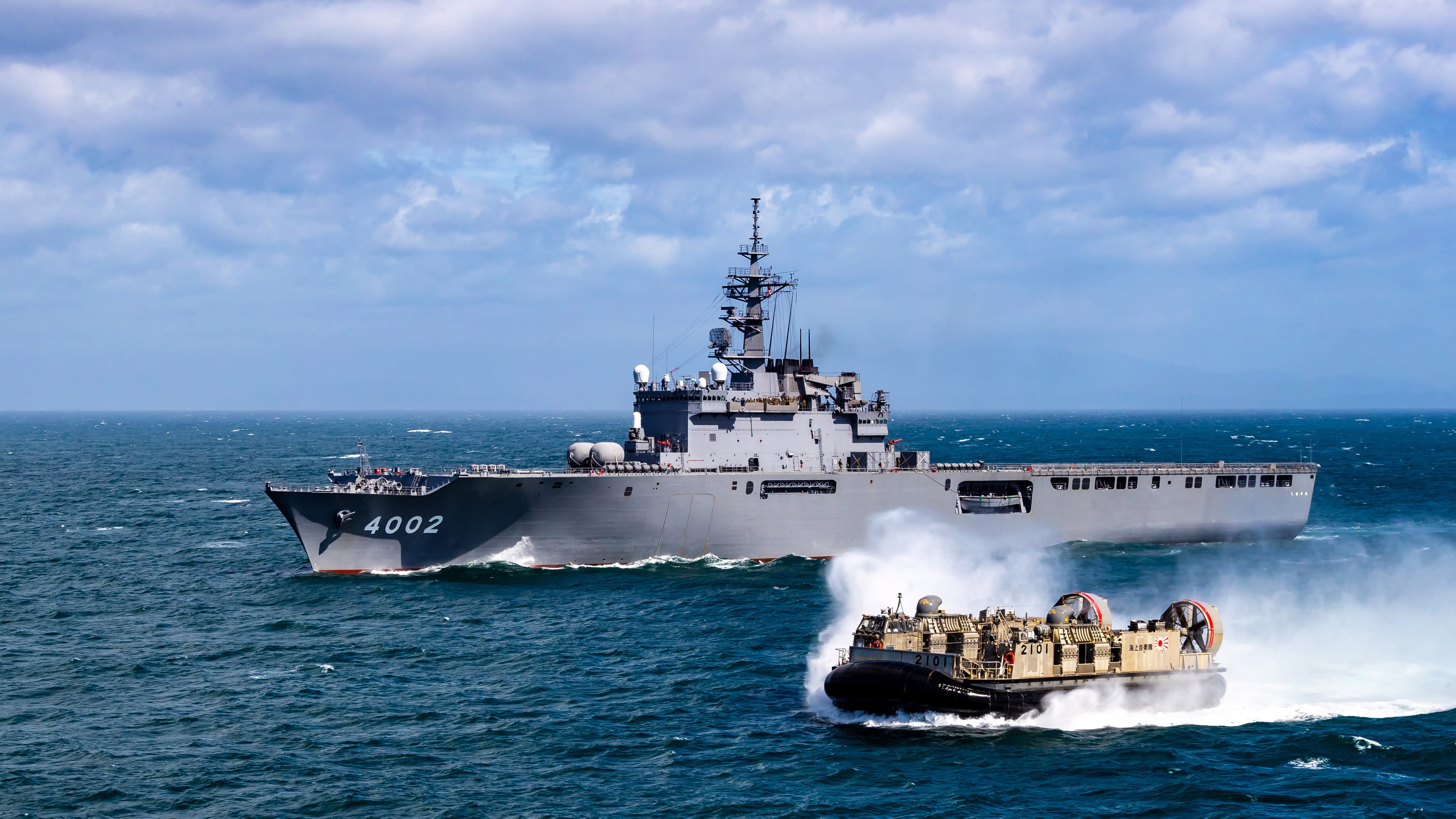
JS Shimokita

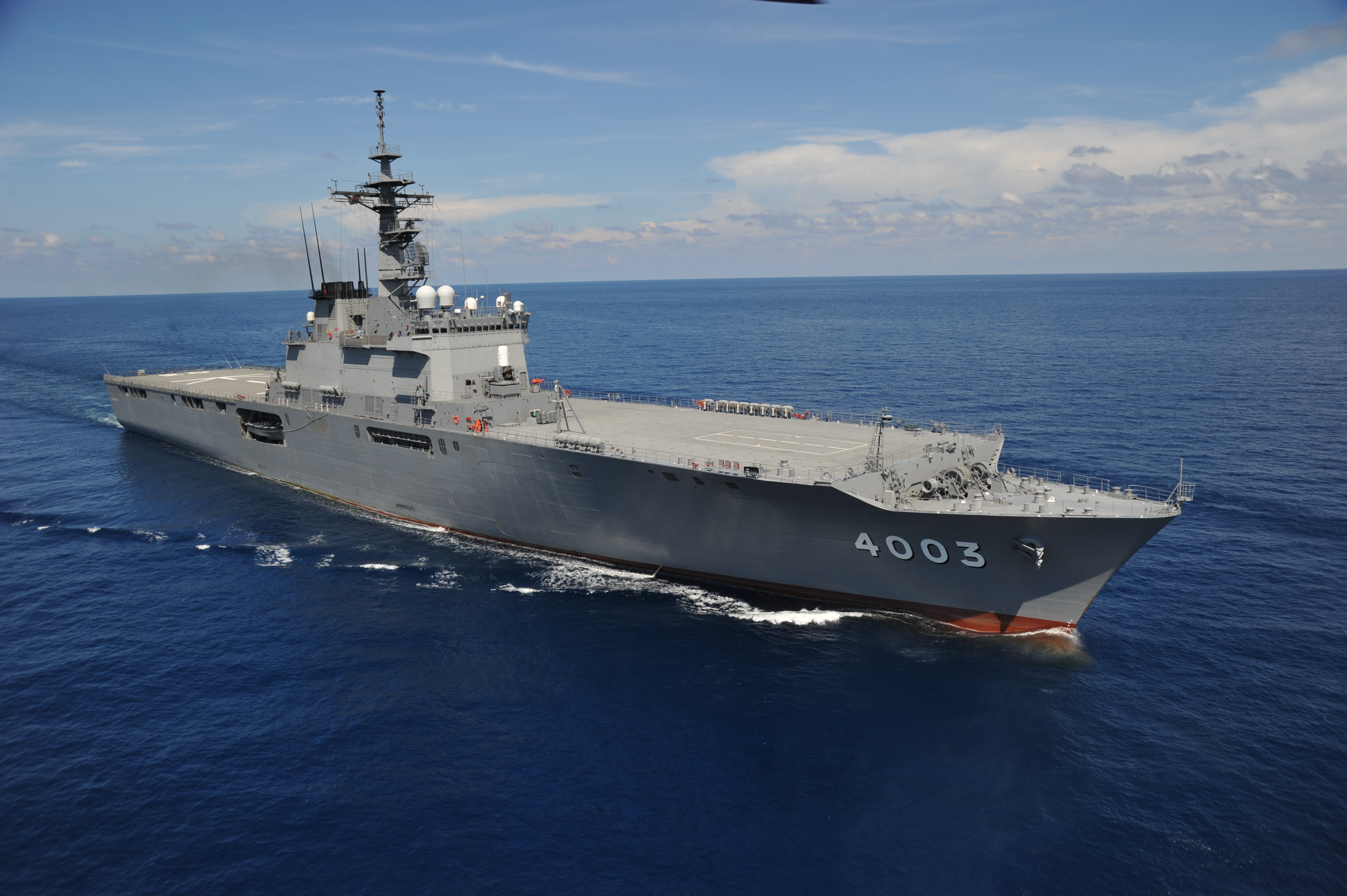
JS Kunisaki

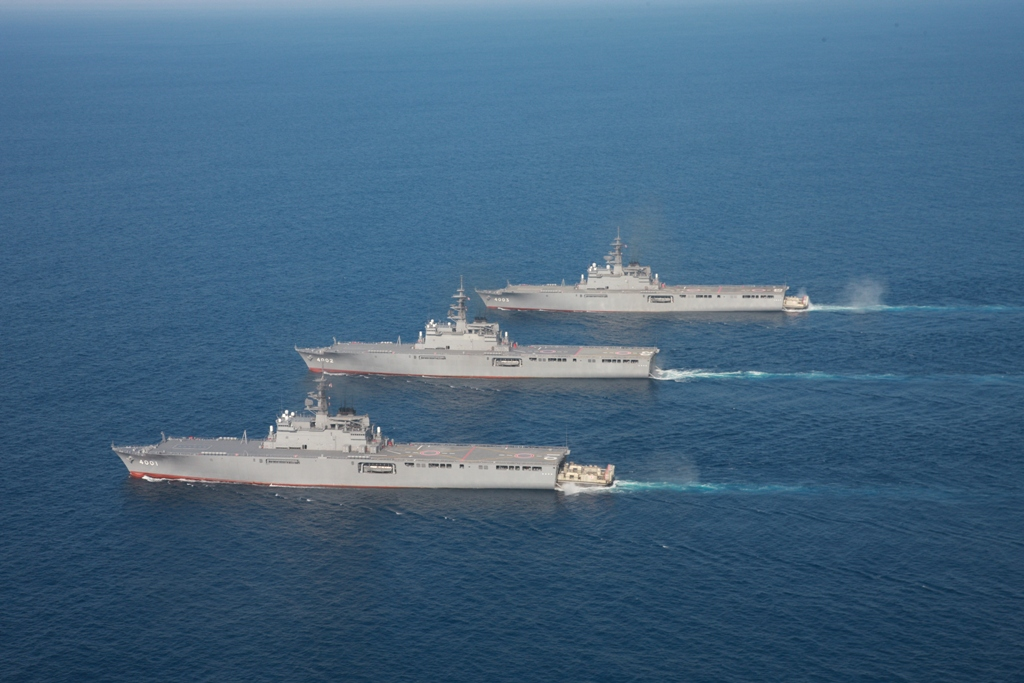
Three Ōsumi-class vessels underway in formation in 2008.

== See also ==
Equivalent amphibious warfare ships of the same era

- Rotterdam class
- Albion class
- Galicia class
- Harpers Ferry class
- Foudre class
