= JS Kunisaki =

Ōsumi-class tank landing ship of the JMSDF

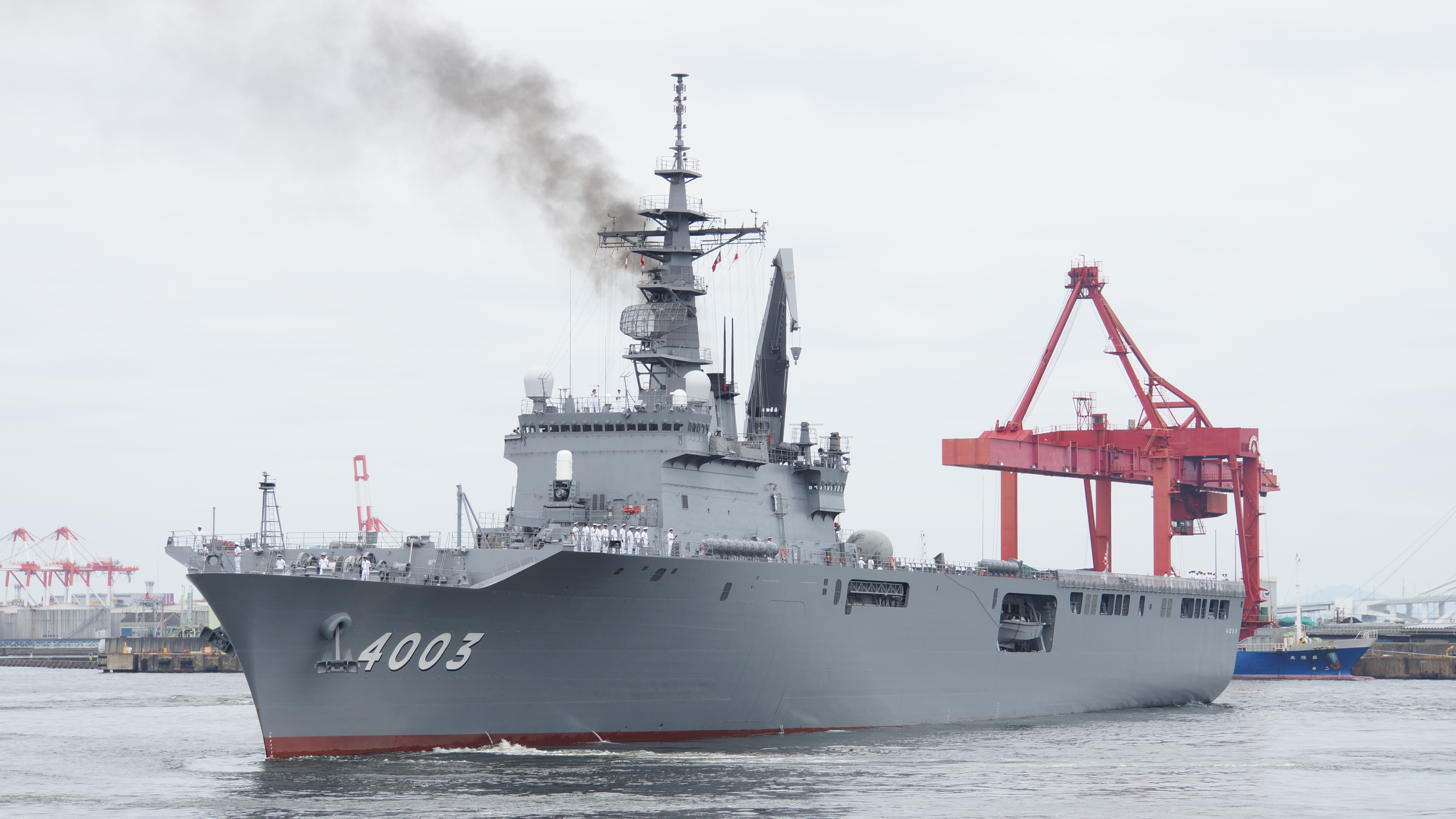
- JS Kunisaki

History

Japan
- Name: Kunisaki; (くにさき)
- Namesake: Kunisaki Peninsula
- Ordered: 1999
- Builder: Hitachi, Maizuru
- Laid down: 7 September 2000
- Launched: 13 December 2001
- Commissioned: 26 February 2003
- Home port: Kure
- Identification: MMSI number: 431999664; Pennant number: LST-4003
- Status: Active

General characteristics
- Class & type: Ōsumi-class tank landing ship
- Displacement: 8,900 t (8,800 long tons) standard; 13,000 t (13,000 long tons) full load
- Length: 178 m (584 ft 0 in)
- Beam: 25.8 m (84 ft 8 in)
- Draught: 17.0 m (55 ft 9 in)
- Propulsion: 2 × Mitsui 16V42M-A Diesel, 26,000 bhp (19,000 kW)); 2 shafts; 1 × bow thruster
- Speed: 22 knots (41 km/h; 25 mph)
- Boats & landing craft carried: 2 × Landing Craft Air Cushion (LCAC)
- Capacity: up to 10 main battle tanks
- Troops: 330 personnel
- Complement: 137
- Sensors & processing systems: OPS-14C air search radar; OPS-28D surface-search radar; OPS-20 navigation radar; TACAN
- Electronic warfare & decoys: 4 × Mark 36 SRBOC
- Armament: 2 × 20 mm Phalanx CIWS; 2 × M2 Browning machine gun
- Aircraft carried: Up to 8 helicopters tied topside
- Aviation facilities: Hangar and helipad

JS Kunisaki (LST-4003) is the third ship of the Ōsumi-class tank landing ships of the Japan Maritime Self-Defense Force (JMSDF).

== Construction and career ==
Kunisaki was laid down on 7 September 2000 and launched on 13 December 2001 by Hitachi Zosen Corporation, Maizuru. She was commissioned into the 1st Landing Group on 26 February 2003.

This ship was one of several in the JMSDF fleet that participated in disaster relief after the 2011 Tōhoku earthquake and tsunami. Kunisaki was the first-ever JMSDF ship to serve as the primary mission platform for the 2014 Pacific Partnership annual humanitarian and disaster response-focused mission. On 29 May 2014, she departed Yokosuka to participate in the 2014 Pacific Partnership. She provided Vietnam, Cambodia, and the Philippines with medical aid and carried out cultural exchanges. On 24 July the ship returned to Kure.

The vessel participated in the integrated training Dawn Blitz 15 in the United States from 18 August to 9 September 2015 with JS Hyūga and JS Ashigara under the command of the Mine Warfare Force, and amphibious warfare training. From 3 to 9 September Kunisaki participated in the ADMM Plus Humanitarian Aid / Disaster Relief and Defense Medical College Exercise (AM-HEx2016) in Thailand from September 3 to 9 of the same year.

Beginning on 5 May 2017, Kunisaki performed joint training with the French Navy's Mistral in the waters around Japan.

On 11 and 12 January 2019, the ship conducted a joint cruise training with several ships including USS Wasp and USS Green Bay in the waters west of Kyushu. From 3 June to 21 August, the ship was under the command of the Mine Warfare Force commander during training with the U.S. military (Talisman Saber 19) at the Shoalwater Bay Exercise Area in Queensland, Australia and the surrounding waters. On 18 June, while participating in the training, she was towed by a tugboat and tried to turn around to leave Brisbane, Australia, but she collided with the quay of the port. The stern door broke, and the quay also broke.

In August 2026, Kunisaki was deployed to help fight forest fires in Indonesia.

== Gallery ==
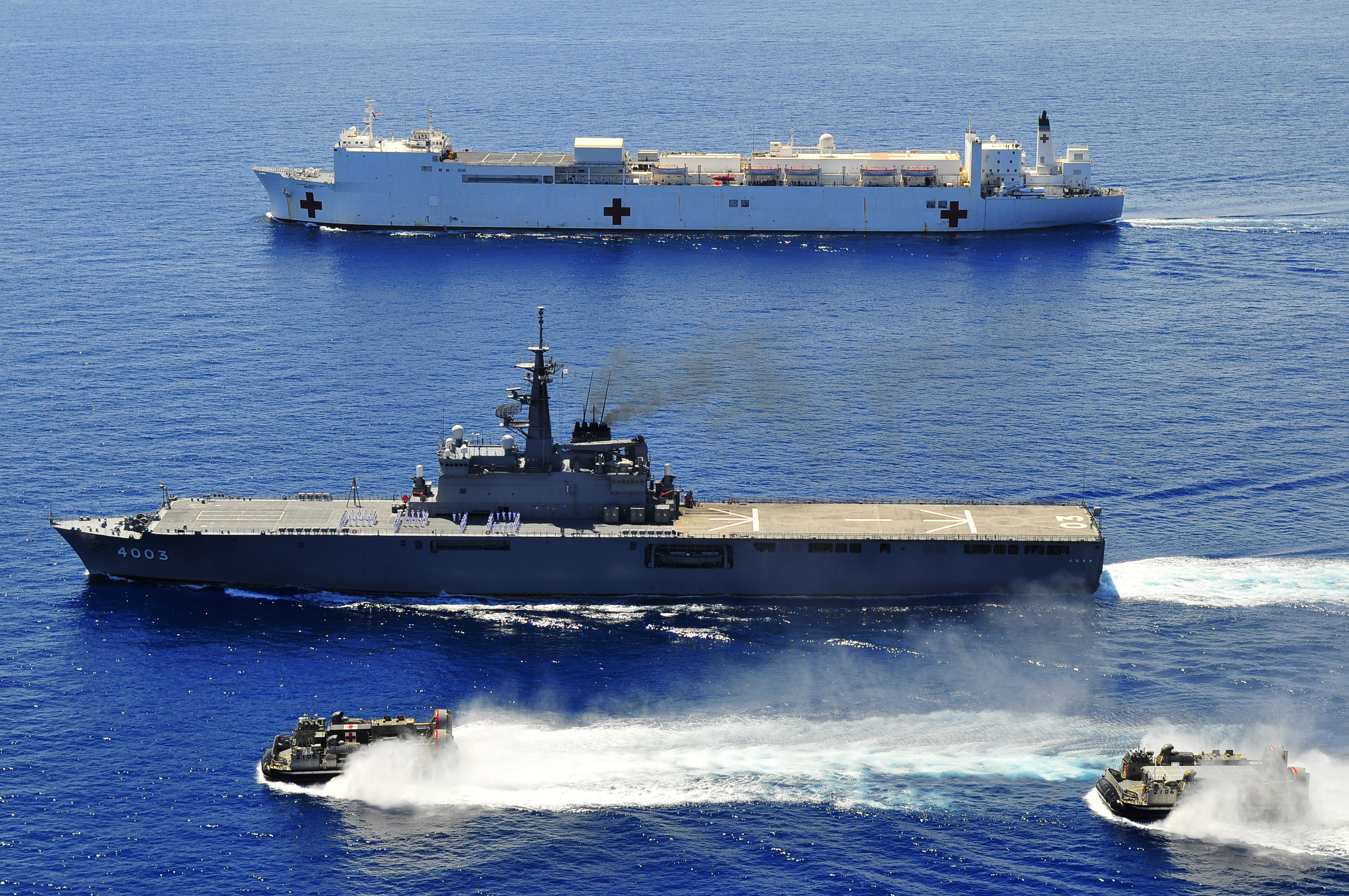
JS Kunisaki and USNS Mercy on 14 June 2010

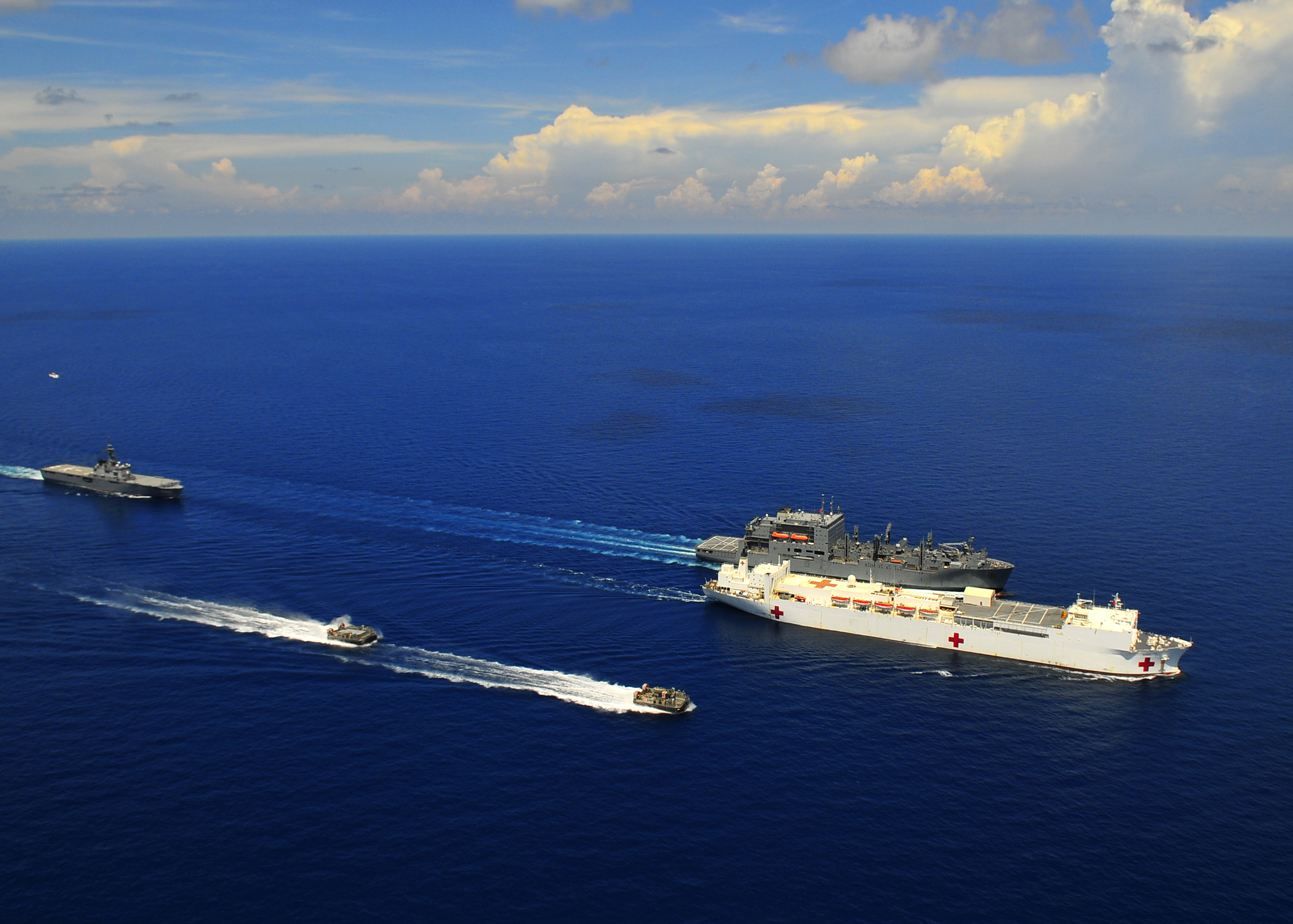

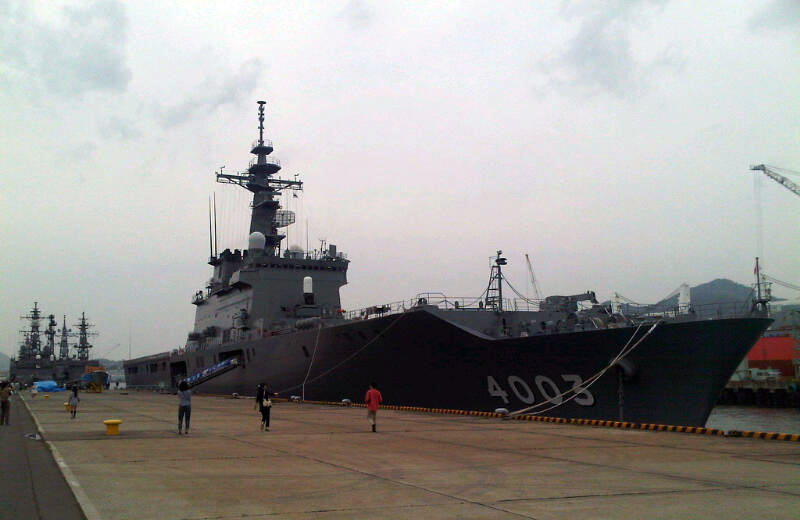
JS Kunisaki at Kure in May 2011

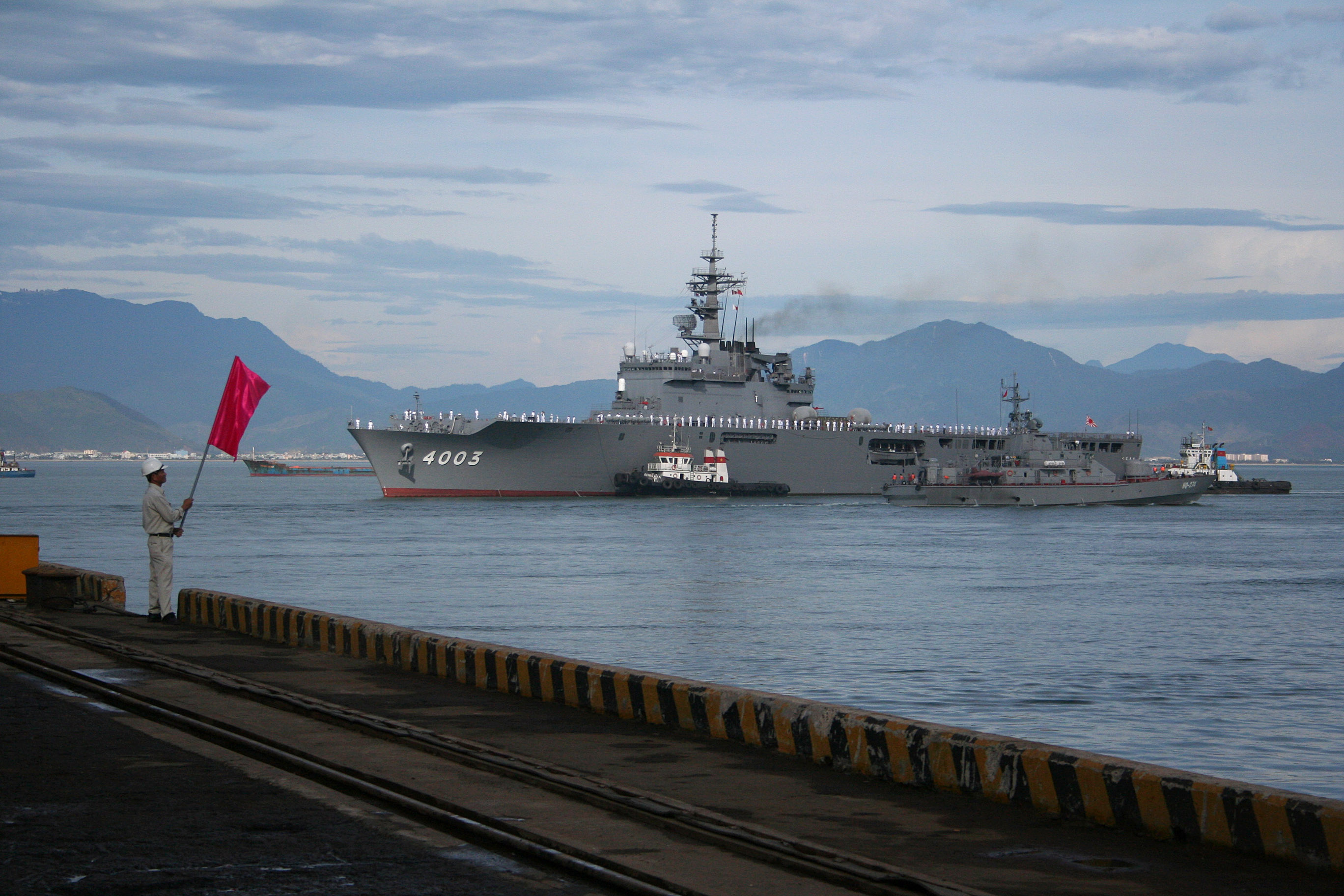
JS Kunisaki at Da Nang in June 2014

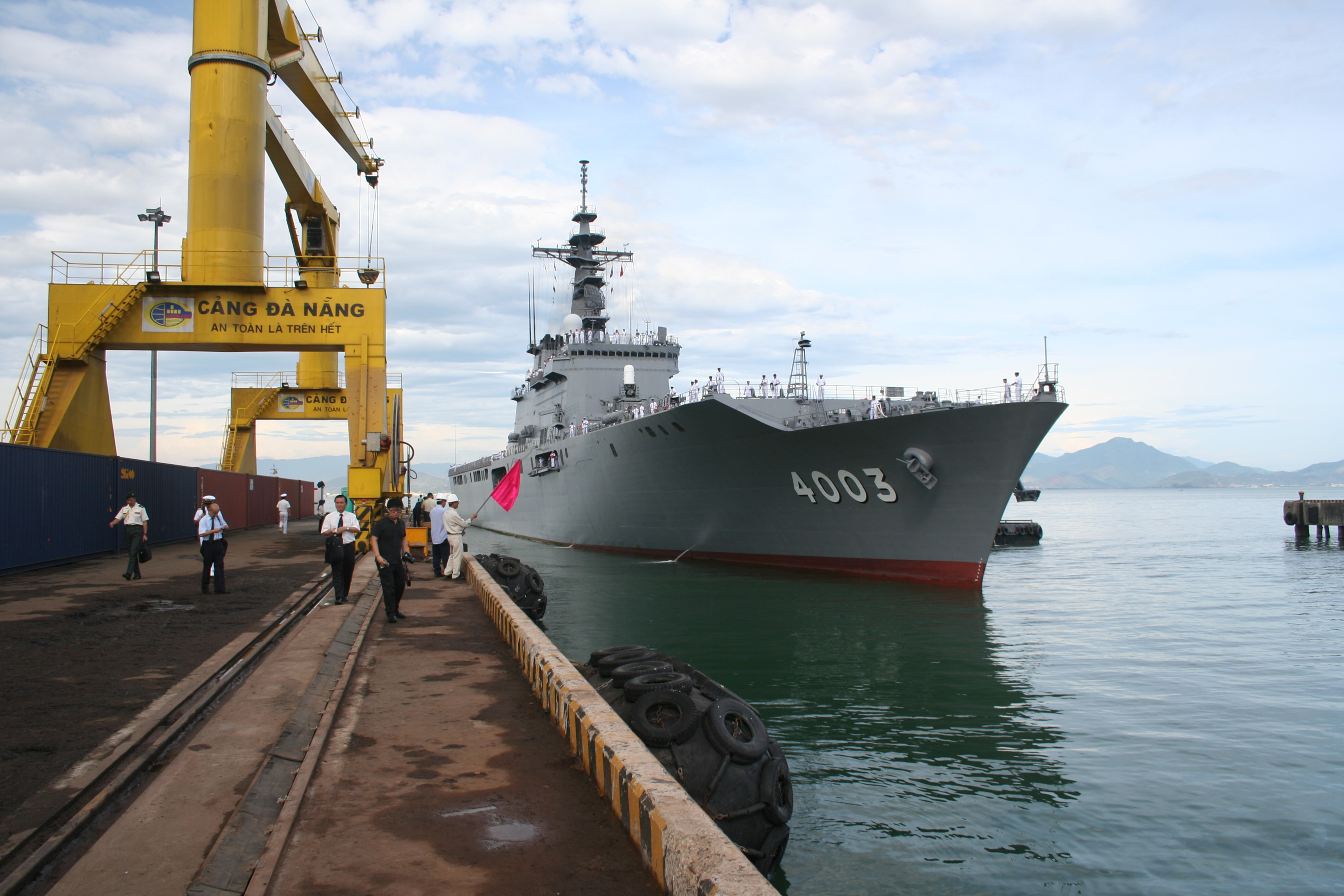

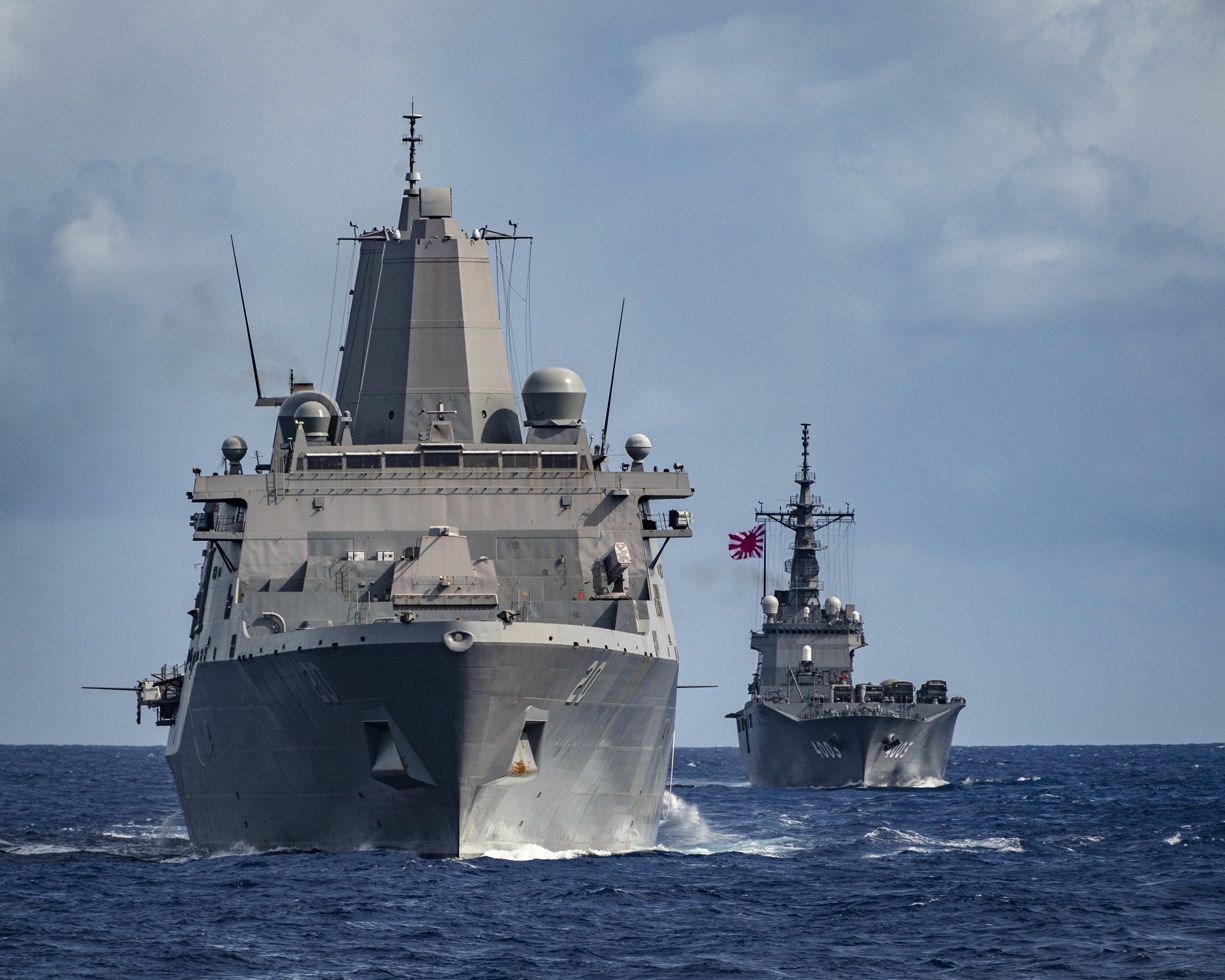
JS Kunisaki and USS Green Bay underway on 10 June 2019
