= JS Shimokita =

Ōsumi-class tank landing ship of the JMSDF

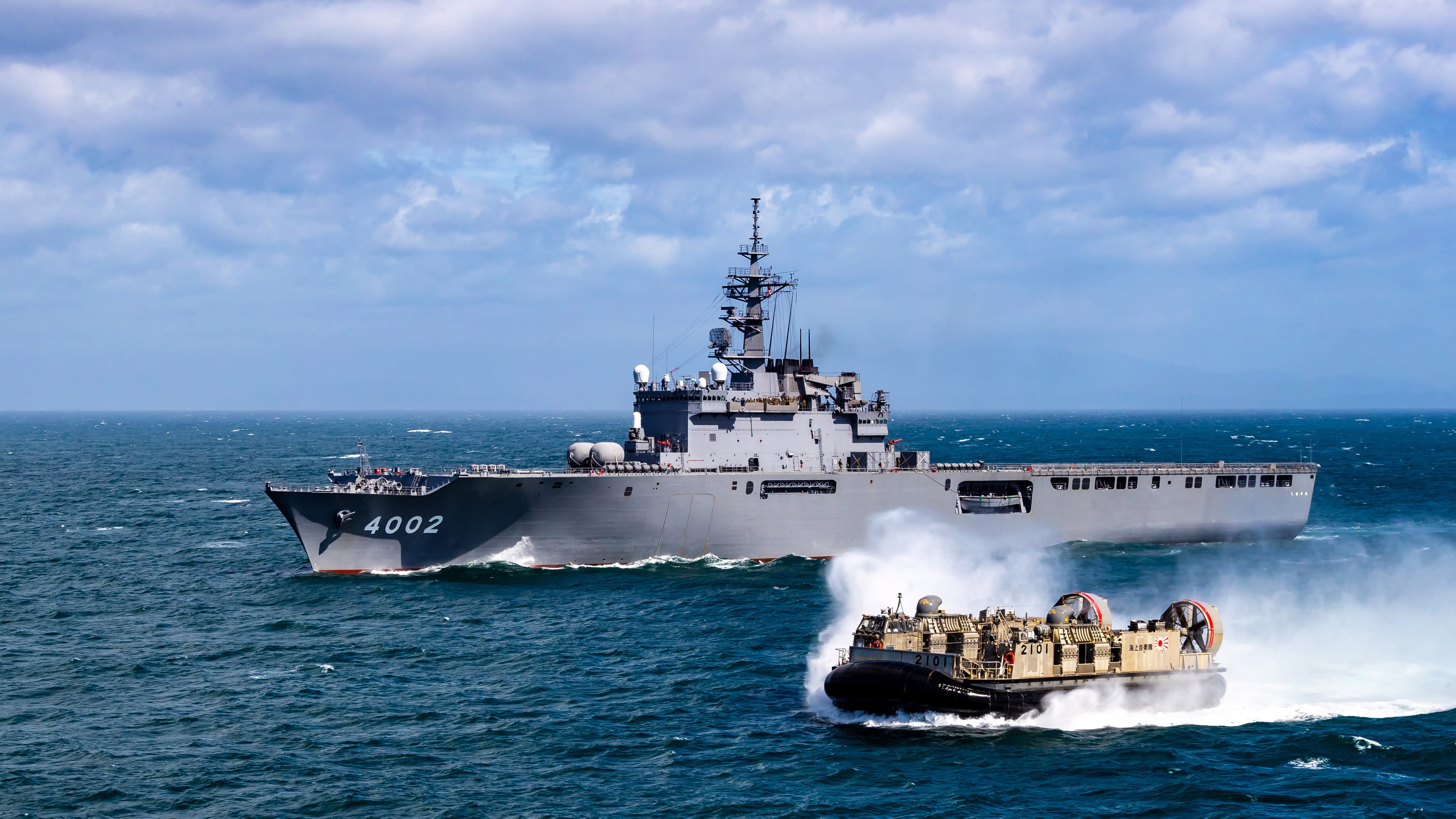
- JS Shimokita

History

Japan
- Name: Shimokita; (しもきた)
- Namesake: Shimokita Peninsula
- Ordered: 1998
- Builder: Mitsui, Tamano
- Laid down: 30 November 1999
- Launched: 29 November 2000
- Commissioned: 12 March 2002
- Home port: Kure
- Identification: MMSI number: 431999652; Pennant number: LST-4002
- Status: Active

General characteristics
- Class & type: Ōsumi-class tank landing ship
- Displacement: 8,900 t (8,800 long tons) standard; 13,000 t (13,000 long tons) full load
- Length: 178 m (584 ft 0 in)
- Beam: 25.8 m (84 ft 8 in)
- Draught: 17.0 m (55 ft 9 in)
- Propulsion: 2 × Mitsui 16V42M-A Diesel, 26,000 bhp (19,000 kW)); 2 shafts; 1 × bow thruster
- Speed: 22 knots (41 km/h; 25 mph)
- Boats & landing craft carried: 2 × Landing Craft Air Cushion (LCAC)
- Capacity: up to 10 main battle tanks
- Troops: 330 personnel
- Complement: 137
- Sensors & processing systems: OPS-14C air search radar; OPS-28D surface-search radar; OPS-20 navigation radar; TACAN
- Electronic warfare & decoys: 4 × Mark 36 SRBOC
- Armament: 2 × 20 mm Phalanx CIWS; 2 × M2 Browning machine gun
- Aircraft carried: Up to 8 helicopters tied topside
- Aviation facilities: Hangar and helipad

JS Shimokita (LST-4002) is the second verity ship of the Ōsumi-class tank landing ships of the Japan Maritime Self-Defense Force (JMSDF).

== Construction and career ==
Shimokita was laid down on 30 November 1999 and launched on 29 November 2000 by Mitsui Engineering & Shipbuilding, Tamano. She was commissioned into the 1st Landing Group on 12 March 2002.

On 7 September 2009, the fifth aviation group together with Okinawa Prefecture to participate in disaster prevention drills, Air Self-Defense Force, Fire Service, NTT, Okinawa Electric Power Company and the Japanese Red Cross Society to train for stacking a variety of vehicles such as ambulance.

From 24 to 27 January 2011, Shimokita and USS Tortuga implemented special training together. In response to the Great East Japan Earthquake off the Pacific coast the vessel was dispatched to respond to the disaster. At the time of the earthquake, the Mitsui Engineering & Shipbuilding Tamano Plant was conducting an annual inspection of the ship, of which completion was accelerated to 1 April, and the vessel joined the disaster relief from 6 April.

From 10 to 26 June 2013, Shimokita participated for the first time in the integrated training Dawn Blitz 13, which was held by the US military at Camp Pendleton, California, and San Clemente Island. In addition, JS Hyūga and JS Atago participated from the Ground Self-Defense Force, including the Western Army Infantry Corps and the Western Air Corps and during the exercise period, a US Marine Corps V-22 Osprey. The vertical takeoff and landing transport aircraft landed aboard the ship.

Shimokita participated in the Okinawa Prefectural Comprehensive Disaster Prevention Drill held on Miyakojima, Taramajima, and Irabujima as part of the 2014 remote island integrated disaster prevention drill held from 3 to 6 September 2014. On 4 November as part of the Chenzi 26 exercise, which is a large-scale exercise of the Ground Self-Defense Force's Western Army, the MLRS of the Western Army was being trained to shoot on the ship's deck.

On 1 July 2016, the 1st Transport Corps was reorganized under the Mine Warfare Force. On 6 July Shimokita departed Kure in order to participate in Pacific Partnership 2016, visiting Vietnam, Palau and other port calls to make medical support and returned to Kure on 20 August.

On 9 April 2018, joint training was conducted with USS Wasp and several other ships in the waters west of Kyushu. From 8 to 24 May, she participated in amphibious rapid deployment exercises with JS Hyūga in the western waters of Kyushu, Tanegashima, Kagoshima Prefecture, and the surrounding waters. In response to the water outage in Kure city due to the heavy rain in July 2018, a special bath installed on the ship moored in the Kure base mooring moat area was opened to those affected on 8/9 July. On 10 July, Shimokita was in Hiroshima Ujina Port while transporting gasoline, diesel fuel about 124 such kiloliters loaded with tank trucks. After that, bathing and water supply support was provided again until 18 July. The people who took a bath were mainly residents of Etajima City, and were picked up by LCAC from the Hitonose LCAC Maintenance Center in the city. On 25 August, the same year, joint training was conducted with the Royal Navy HMS Albion in the waters south of Honshu.

== Gallery ==
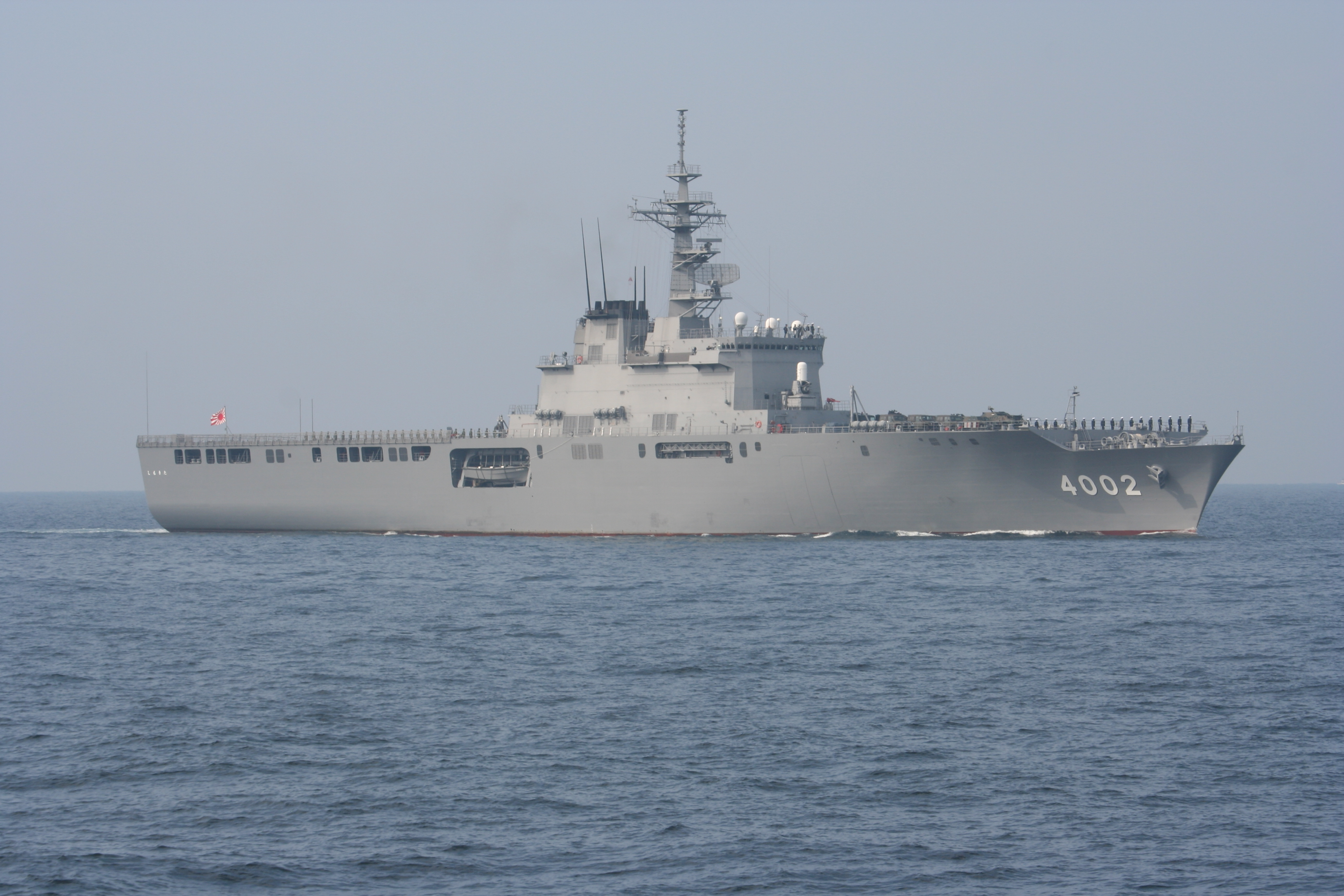
JS Shimokita on 29 October 2006

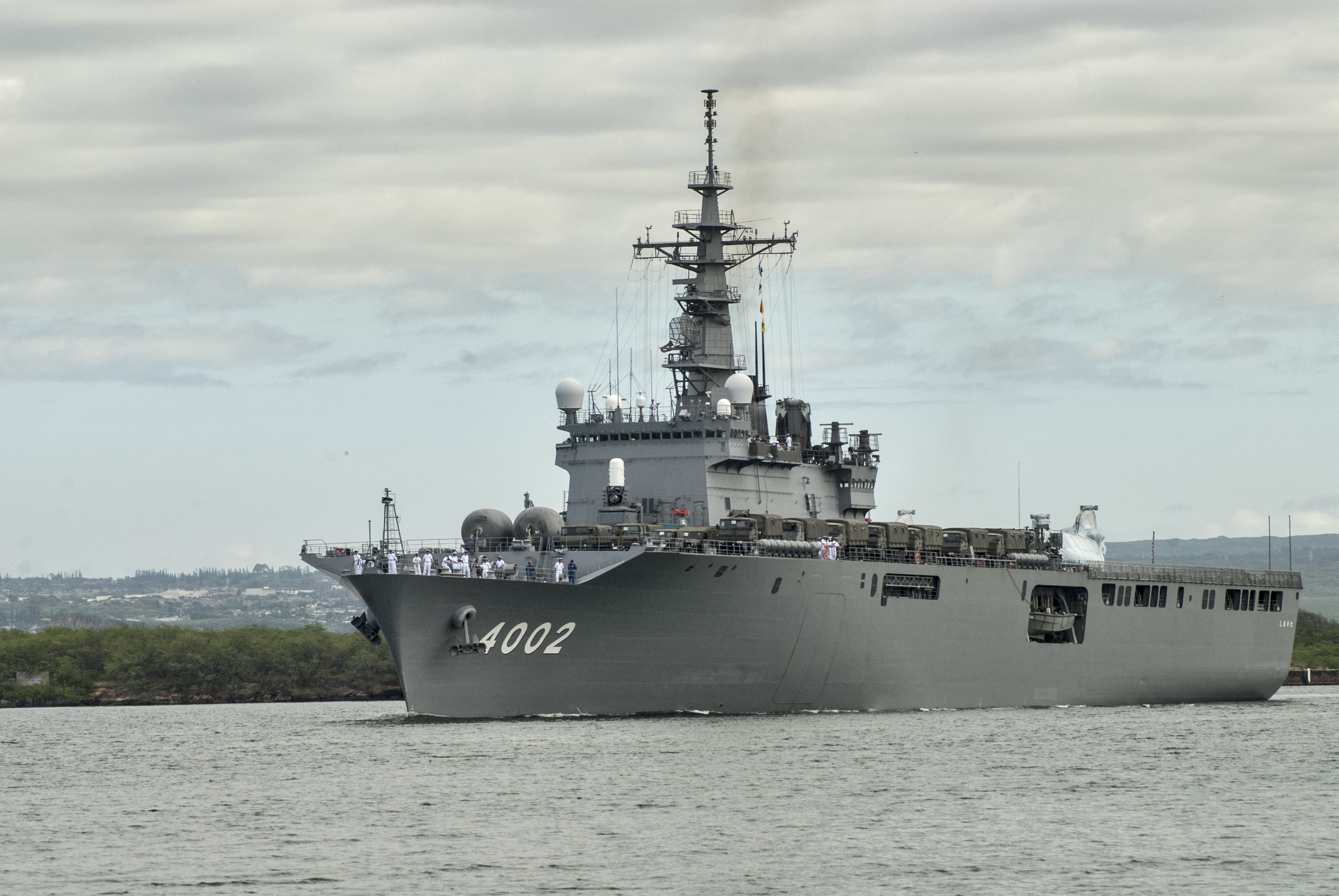
JS Shimokita leaving Pearl Harbor on 20 May 2013

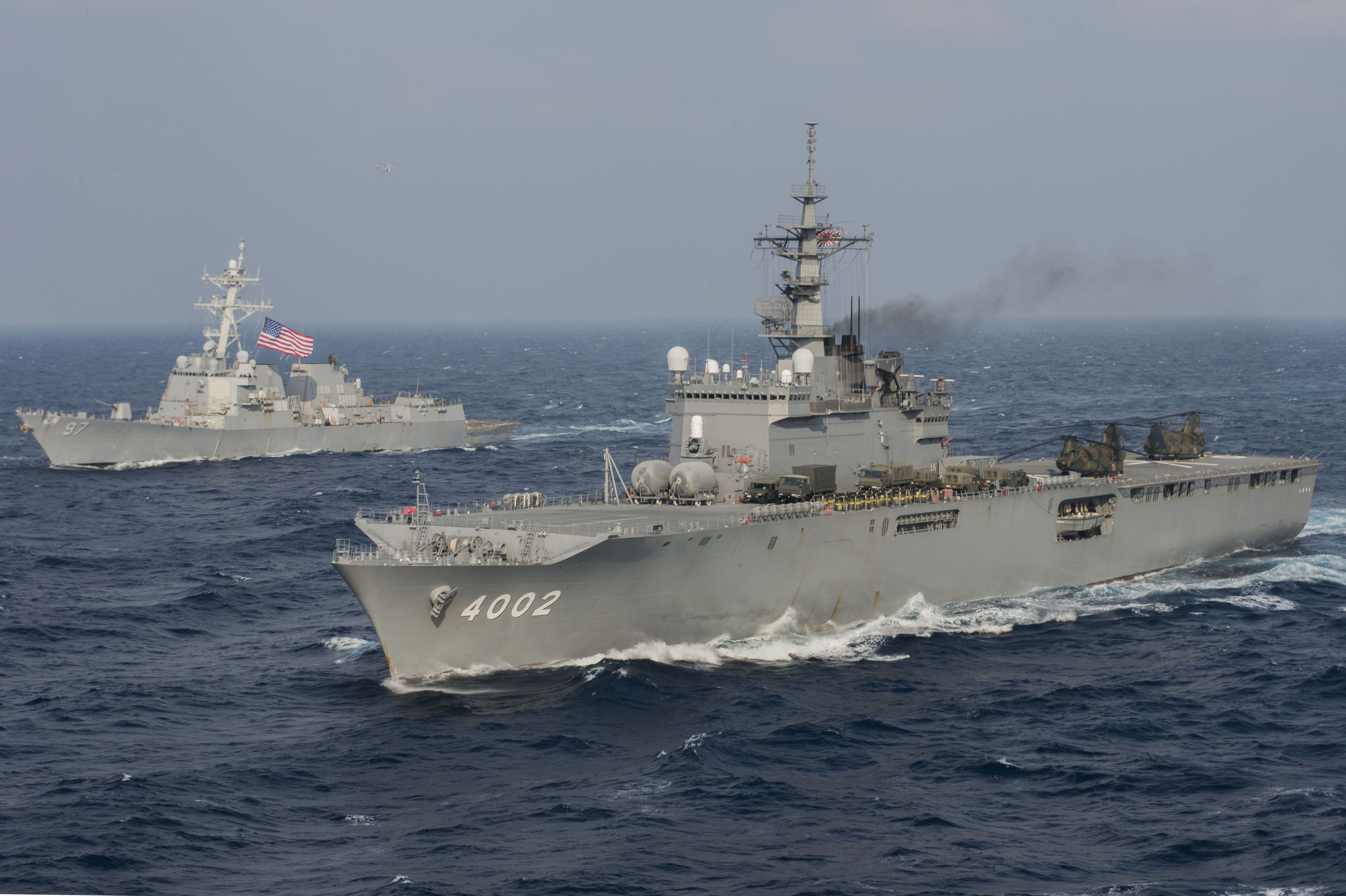
JS Shimokita and USS Halsey on 12 November 2014

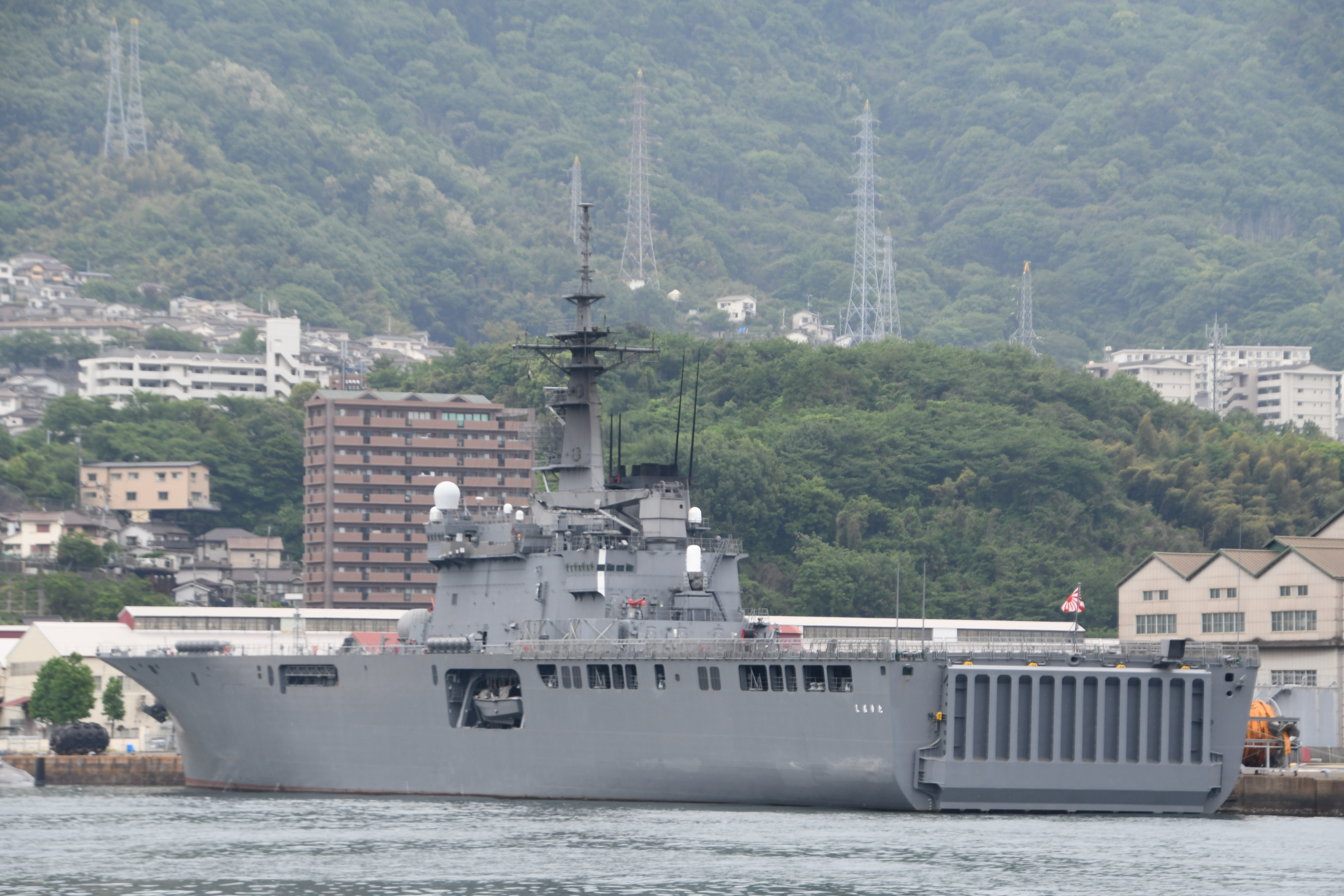
JS Shimokita at Kure on 6 May 2018

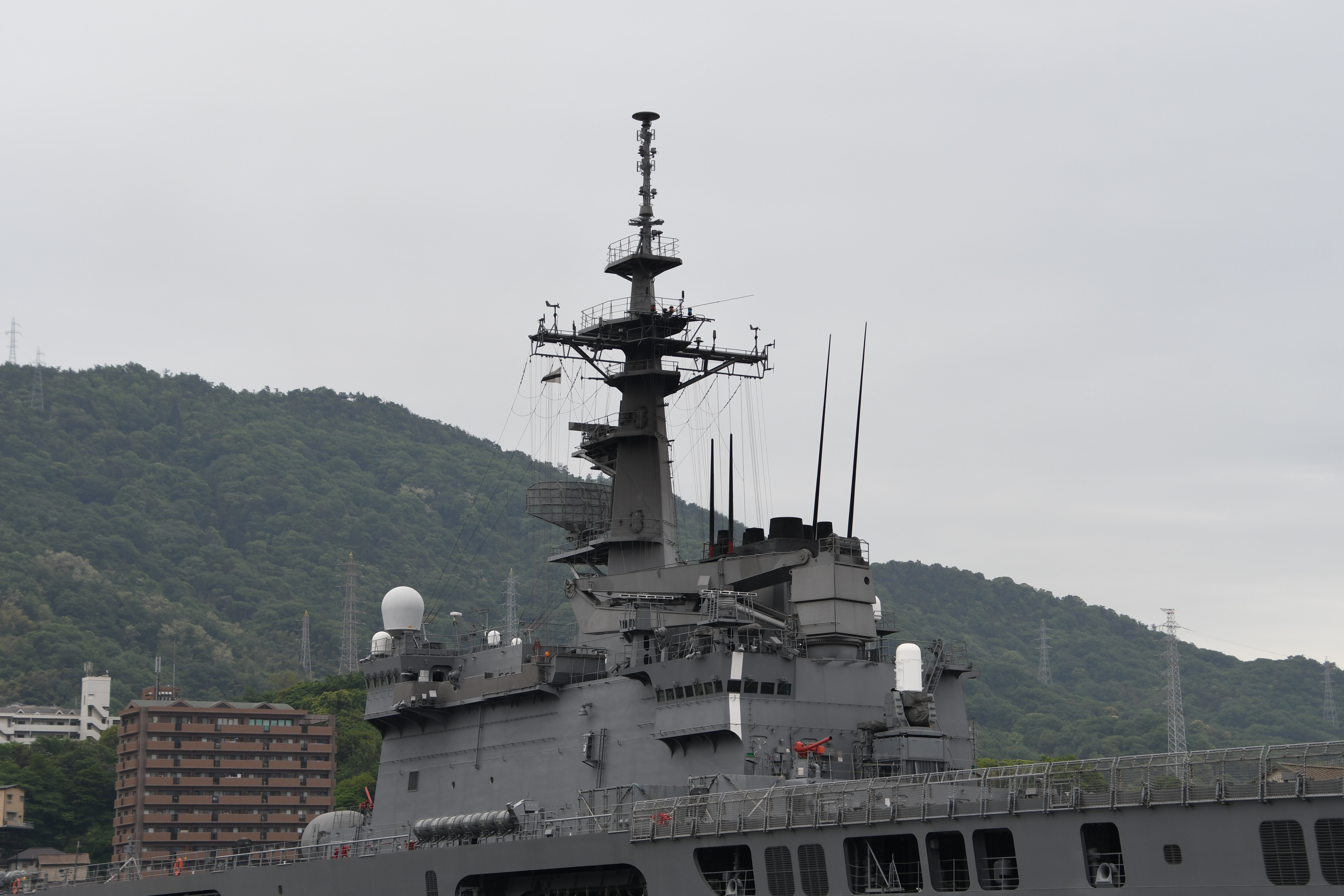

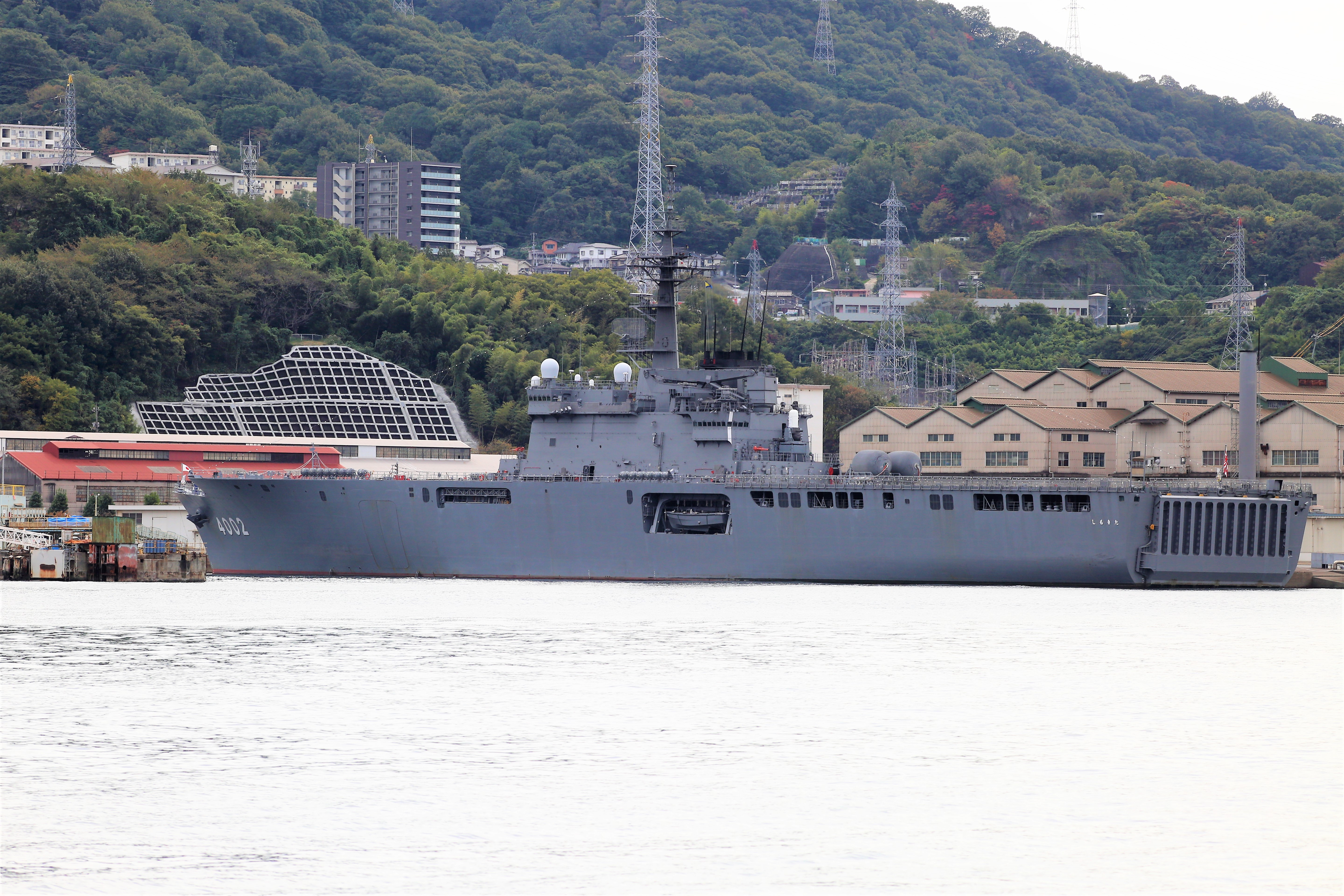
JS Shimokita at Kure on 20 October 2019
