= JS Taigei =

Taigei-class attack submarine

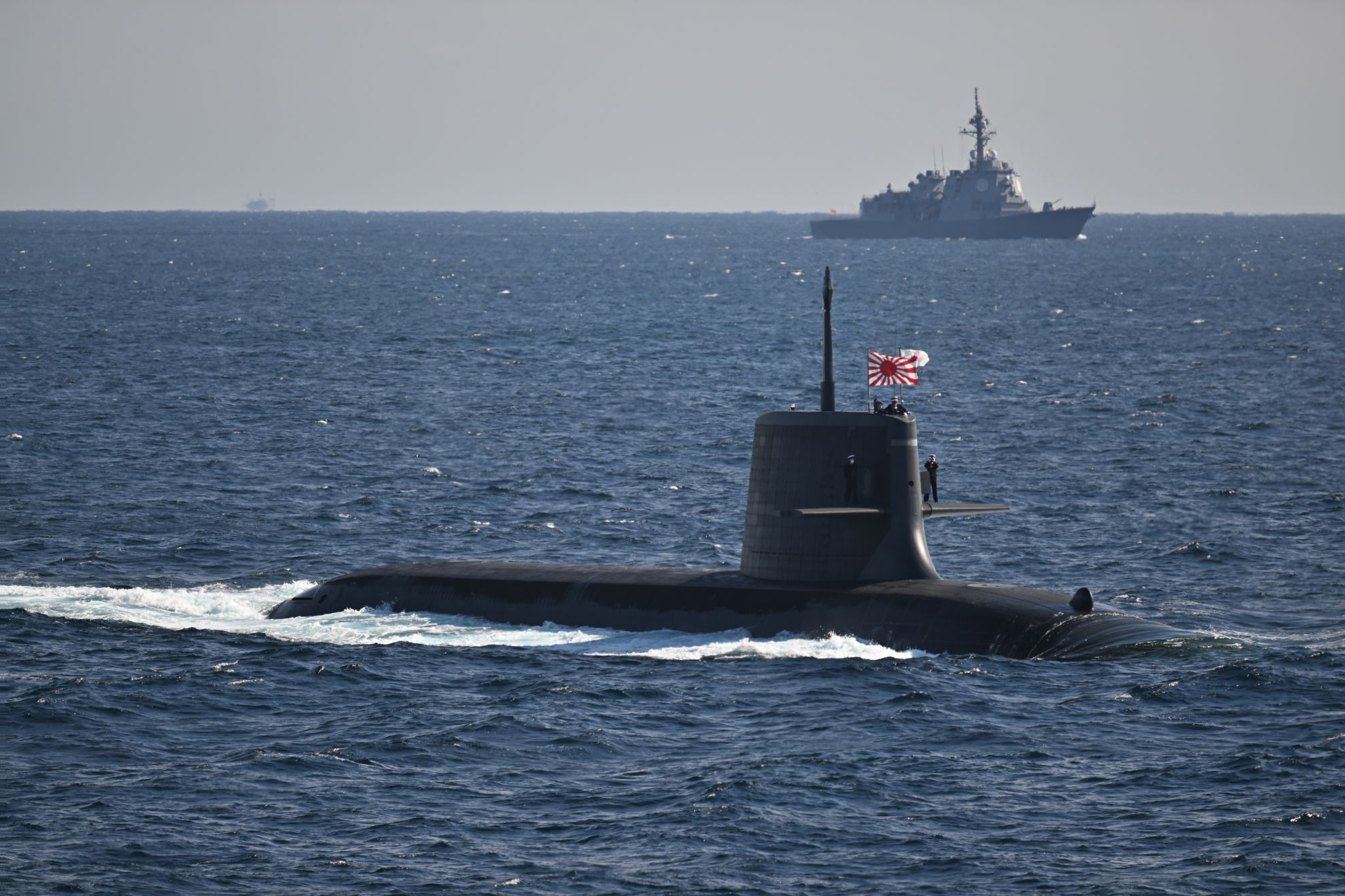
- JS Taigei after her conversion to an experimental submarine

History

Japan
- Name: Taigei (たいげい)
- Namesake: Big Whale
- Ordered: 2017
- Builder: Mitsubishi Heavy Industries
- Cost: ¥69.7 billion
- Laid down: 16 March 2018
- Launched: 14 October 2020
- Commissioned: 9 March 2022
- Reclassified: Experimental submarine, 8 March 2024
- Identification: SS-513 (until 2024); SSE-6201 (from 2024)
- Status: Active

General characteristics
- Class & type: Taigei-class submarine
- Displacement: Surface: 3,000 tonnes
- Length: 84.0 m (275 ft 7 in)
- Beam: 9.1 m (29 ft 10 in)
- Draught: 10.4 m (34 ft 1 in)
- Complement: 70
- Sensors & processing systems: ZPS-6H surface/low-level air search radar; Oki ZQQ-8 Sonar
- Armament: 6 × HU-606 21 in (533 mm) torpedo tubes for: 1.) Type 89 torpedo or Type 18 torpedo; 2.) Harpoon (missile)

JS Taigei (SS-513) is the first boat of the Taigei-class attack submarine of Japan Maritime Self-Defense Force. The submarine was ordered from Mitsubishi Heavy Industries in 2017 and laid down on 16 March 2018 at Kobe, Japan. Taigei was launched on 14 October 2020 and commissioned on 9 March 2022.

== Development and design ==
The hull design of the Taigei class is said to not differ too much from the operational Sōryū class but will be 100 tons heavier than its predecessor. However, the Taigei-class submarines will be more advanced as they are equipped with newer equipment such as sonar systems and snorkel power generation system. The Taigei class will use lithium-ion batteries much like Ōryū and Tōryū of the Sōryū-class submarines. The submarine will likely use the Type 18 torpedo, which project name is "G-RX6". In addition, in response to the lifting of restrictions on the placement of female SDF personnel on submarines, the work of female SDF personnel is being supported by establishing partitions in the living quarters and securing bedrooms for women.

== Construction and career ==
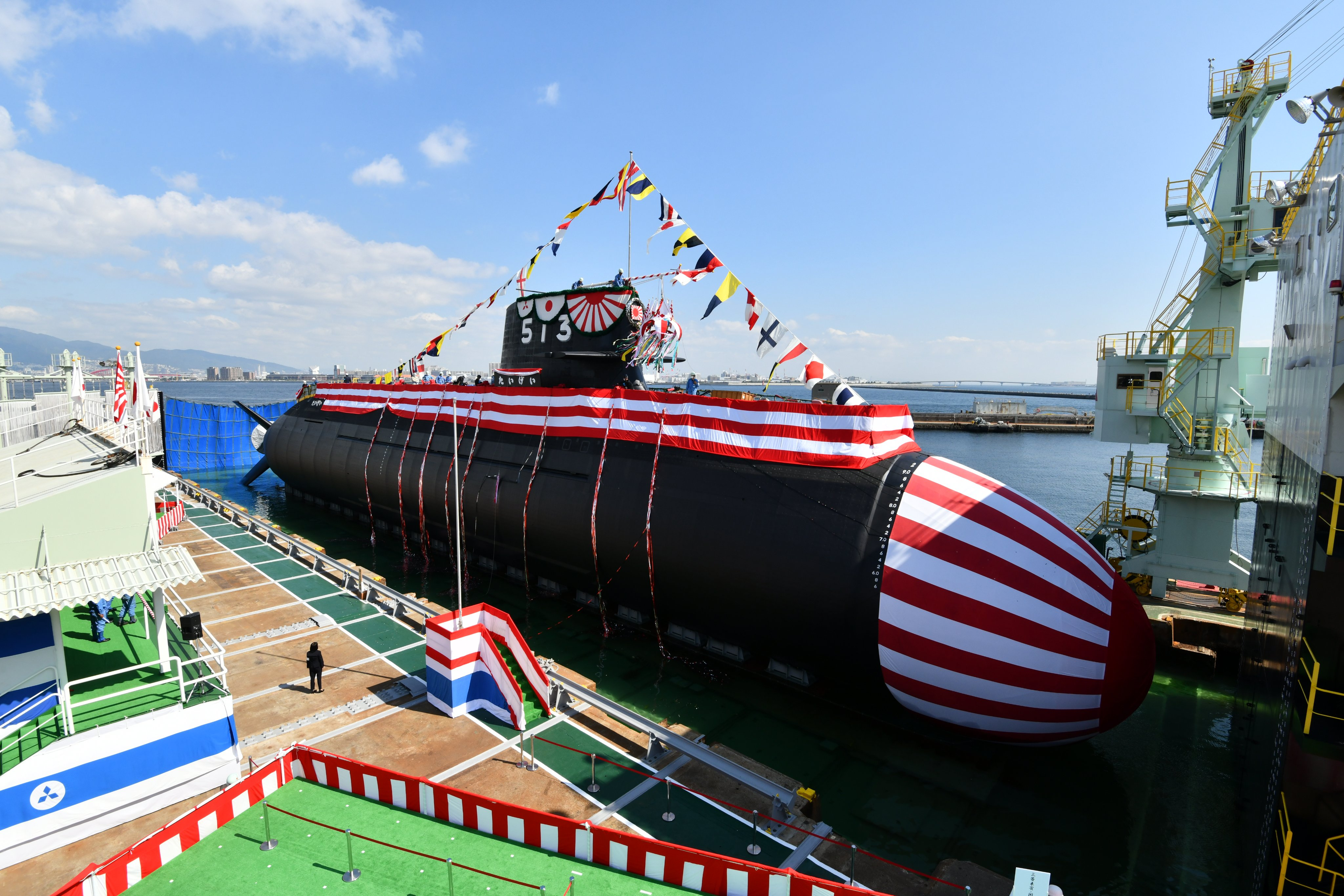
JS Taigei on 14 October 2020

Taigei was laid down at Mitsubishi Heavy Industries Kobe Shipyard on 16 March 2018 as the 2017 plan 3000-ton submarine No. 8128 based on the medium-term defense capability development plan (26 medium-term defense), and in 2020. It was named Taigei at the naming and launching ceremony held at the factory on 14 October. It was handed over to the Maritime Self-Defense Force on 9 March 2022 and deployed to the Yokosuka Naval Base. Construction cost was estimated at US$720 million.

In June 2023, the submarine participated in exercises with a visiting vessel of the French Navy, the frigate Lorraine.

With the commissioning of JS Jingei, on 8 March 2024, Taigei was converted to experimental submarine SSE-6201. Thereafter, Taigei is used as a testbed for new equipment such as sonar equipment and underwater launchers with noise reduction, benefiting the technological research and development of Japanese submarines, while freeing up other submarines for combat missions, which until then new equipment had to be tested on active submarines in rotation.
