= Japanese ship Jingei =

Three Japanese Naval vessels have been named Jingei:

- Japanese warship Jingei, a corvette launched in 1876 and struck in 1894
- Japanese submarine tender Jingei, a Jingei-class submarine tender launched in 1923 and lost in 1944
- JS Jingei, a Taigei-class submarine launched 2022 and commissioned in 2024
