= JS Jingei =

Taigei-class attack submarine

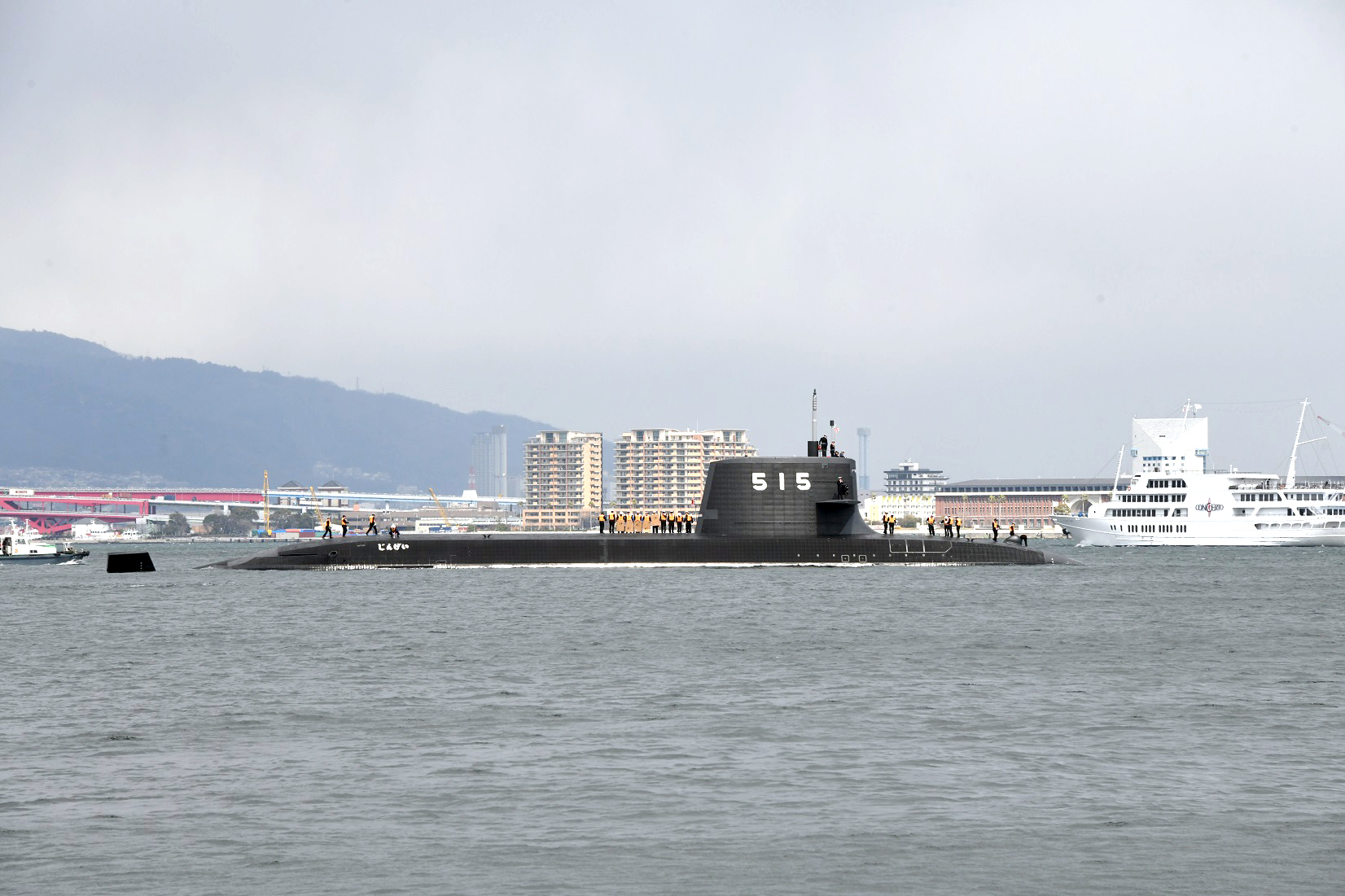
- Jingei departs from MHI Kobe Shipyard after being commissioned

History

Japan
- Name: Jingei
- Ordered: 2019
- Builder: Mitsubishi Heavy Industries Kobe Shipyard
- Laid down: 24 April 2020
- Launched: 12 October 2022
- Commissioned: 8 March 2024
- Identification: Pennant number: SS-515
- Status: Active

General characteristics
- Class & type: Taigei-class submarine
- Displacement: 3,000 t (3,000 long tons) (standard)
- Length: 84 m (275 ft 7 in)
- Beam: 9.1 m (29 ft 10 in)
- Depth: 10.4 m (34 ft 1 in)
- Installed power: 6,000 PS (4,400 kW; 5,900 hp)
- Propulsion: Diesel-electric transmission, lithium-ion batteries
- Crew: 70
- Sensors & processing systems: OYX-1 Information processing subsystem; ZQX-12; 1x ZPS-6H surface search radar; ZQQ-8 Integrated Sonar
- Armament: 6 × HU-606 21 in (533 mm) torpedo tubes for: 1.) Type 89 torpedo or Type 18 torpedo; 2.) Harpoon (missile)

Jingei (じんげい ) is a diesel-electric submarine of the Japan Maritime Self-Defense Force, and the third boat of the Taigei class. Her name is written in kanji as 迅鯨 (fast whale), derived from the expression "of the king of the sea, the whale, racing through the waves." She is the third warship to be named Jingei, after the Imperial Japanese Navy's paddle steamer Jingei, and the lead ship of the Jingei-class submarine tenders. Like her older sisters Taigei and Hakugei, Jingei will be equipped with a dedicated living area for up to six female crew members from the time of commissioning.

== History ==
Jingei was ordered in 2019, and laid down on 24 April 2020 at Mitsubishi Heavy Industries Kobe Shipyard as the third 3,000-ton submarine planned for the Mid-Term Defense Program. She was christened, and launched on 12 October 2022 at the same shipyard. She was commissioned on 8 March 2024, assigned to the 4th Submarine Squadron of the 2nd Submarine Group, and deployed to Yokosuka.
