= Japanese ship Chōgei =

Three Japanese naval vessels have been named Chōgei (長鯨, long whale):

- Japanese warship Chōgei Maru, a transport ship active during the Boshin War
- Japanese submarine tender Chōgei, a Jingei-class submarine tender of the Imperial Japanese Navy during World War II
- JS Chōgei, a Taigei-class submarine of the Japan Maritime Self-Defense Force launched in 2024
