= JS Hakugei =

Taigei-class attack submarine

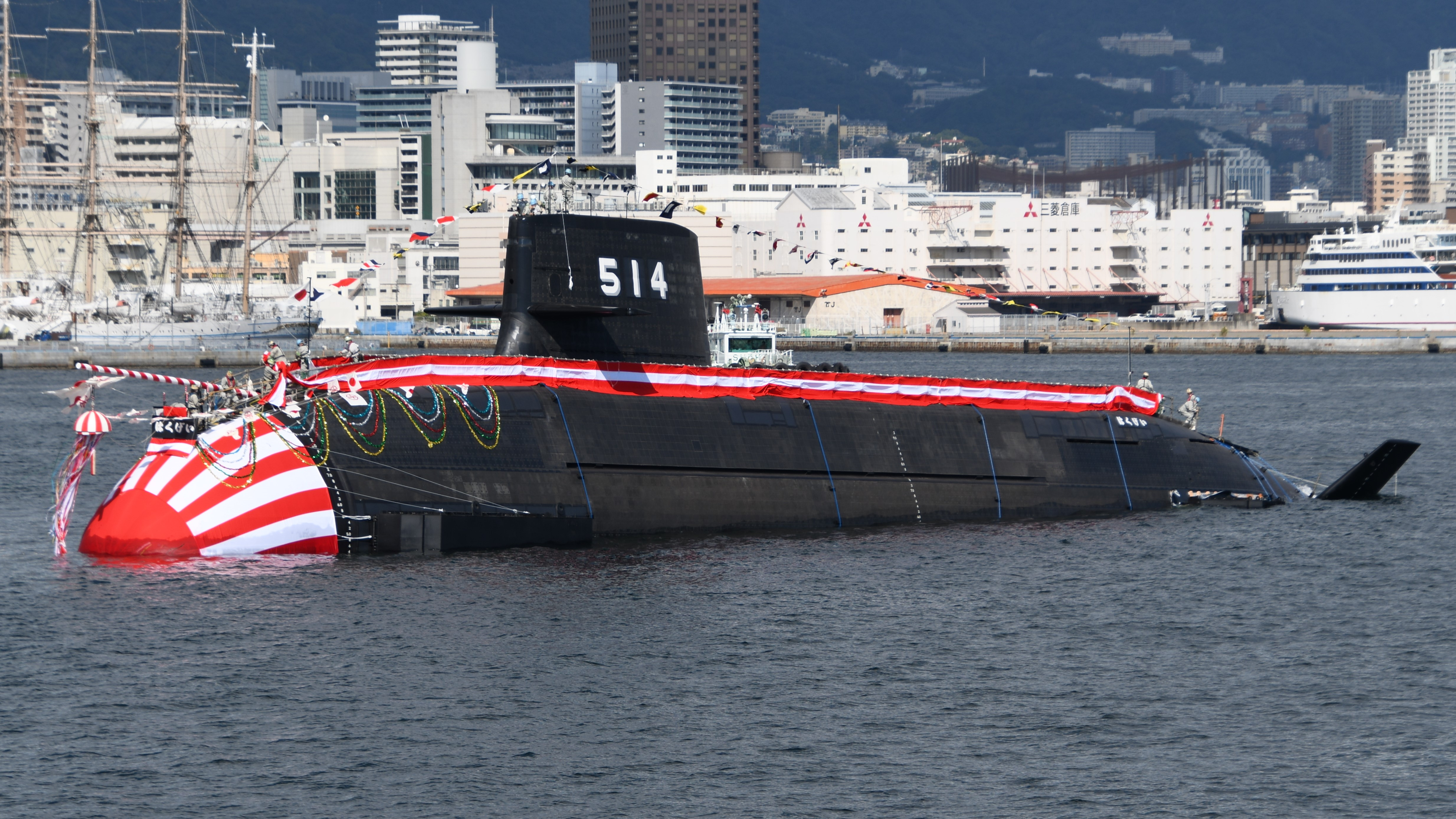
- JS Hakugei being launched on 14 October 2021

History

Japan
- Name: Hakugei (はくげい)
- Namesake: White Sperm Whale
- Ordered: 2018
- Builder: Kawasaki Heavy Industries
- Cost: ¥69.7 billion
- Laid down: 25 January 2019
- Launched: 14 October 2021
- Commissioned: 20 March 2023
- Identification: SS-514
- Status: Active

General characteristics
- Class & type: Taigei-class submarine
- Displacement: Surface: 3,000 tonnes
- Length: 84.0 m (275 ft 7 in)
- Beam: 9.1 m (29 ft 10 in)
- Draught: 10.4 m (34 ft 1 in)
- Complement: 70
- Sensors & processing systems: ZPS-6H surface/low-level air search radar; Oki ZQQ-8 Sonar
- Armament: 6 × HU-606 21 in (533 mm) torpedo tubes for: 1.) Type 89 torpedo or Type 18 torpedo; 2.) Harpoon (missile)

JS Hakugei (SS-514), "White Sperm Whale", is the second boat of the Taigei-class attack submarine of Japan Maritime Self-Defense Force. The submarine was ordered from Kawasaki Heavy Industries in 2018 and laid down on 25 January 2019 at Kobe, Japan. Hakugei was launched on 14 October 2021. She was commissioned in March 2023.

== Development and design ==
The hull design of the Taigei class is said to not differ too much from the operational Sōryū class but will be 100 tons heavier than its predecessor. However, the Taigei-class submarines will be more advanced as they are equipped with newer equipment such as sonar and snorkel power generation systems. The Taigei class will use lithium-ion batteries, much like JS Ōryū and JS Tōryū of the Sōryū-class submarines. The submarine will likely use the Type 18 torpedo, which project name as "G-RX6". In addition, in response to the lifting of restrictions on the placement of female SDF personnel on submarines, the work of female SDF personnel is being supported by establishing partitions in the living quarters and separate sleeping quarters for women.

== Construction and career ==
Hakugei was laid down at Kawasaki Heavy Industries Kobe Shipyard on 25 January 2019 as the 2017 plan 3000-ton submarine No. 8129 based on the medium-term defense capability development plan (26 medium-term defense), and in 2020. It was named Hakugei at the naming and launching ceremony held at the factory on 14 October. It was handed over to the Maritime Self-Defense Force on 20 March 2022.

== Gallery ==
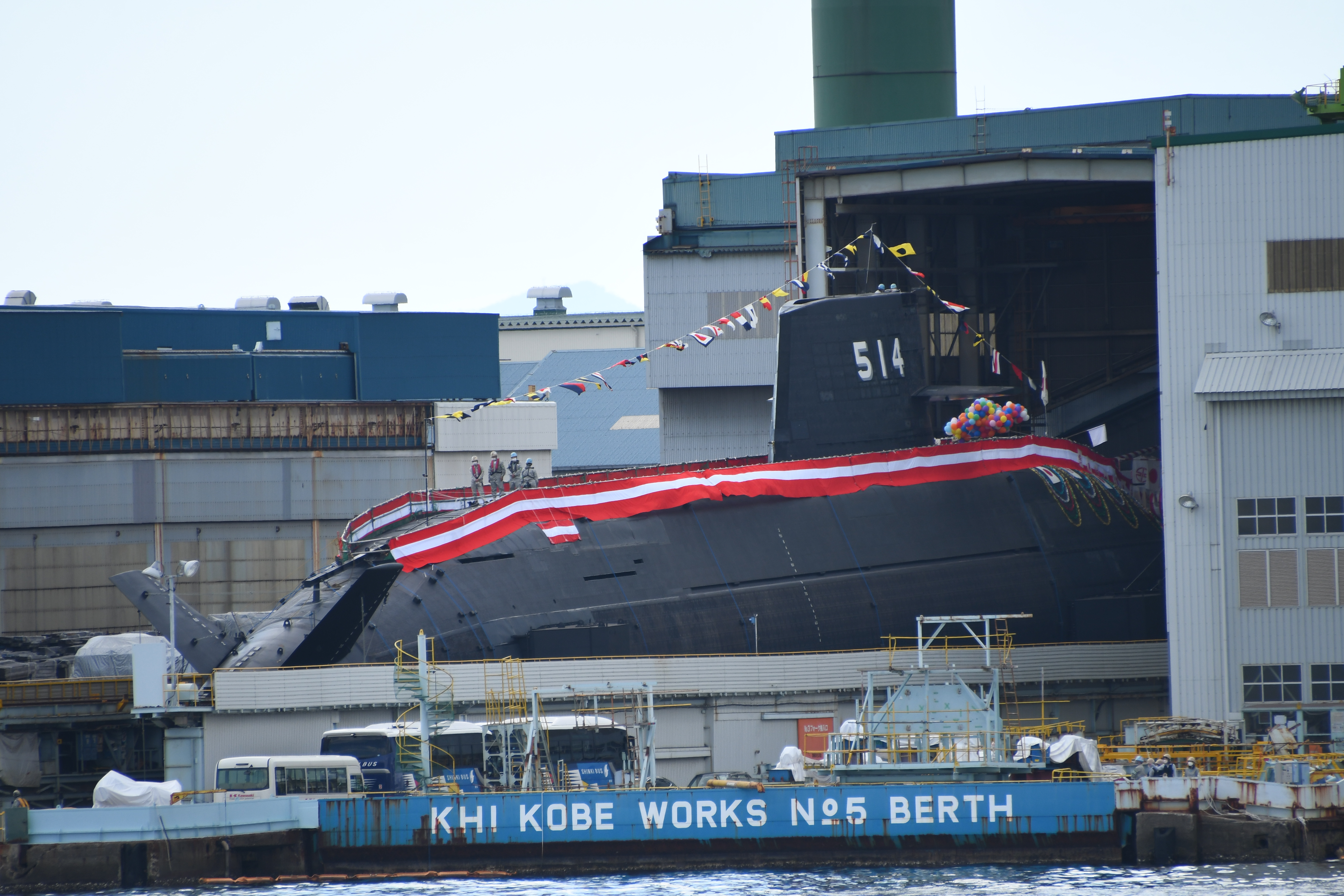
Hakugeis launching ceremony

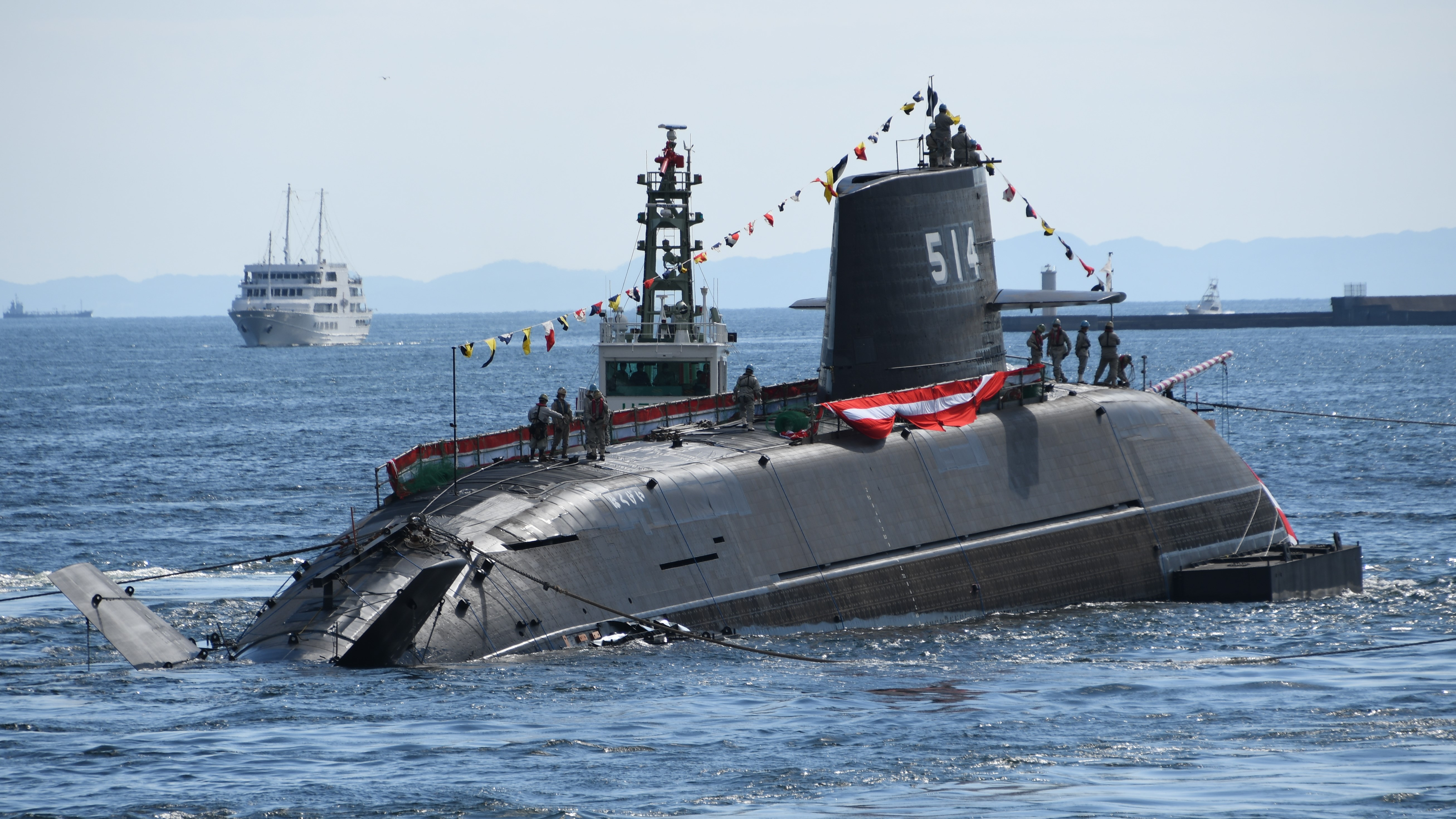
Aft view of Hakugei

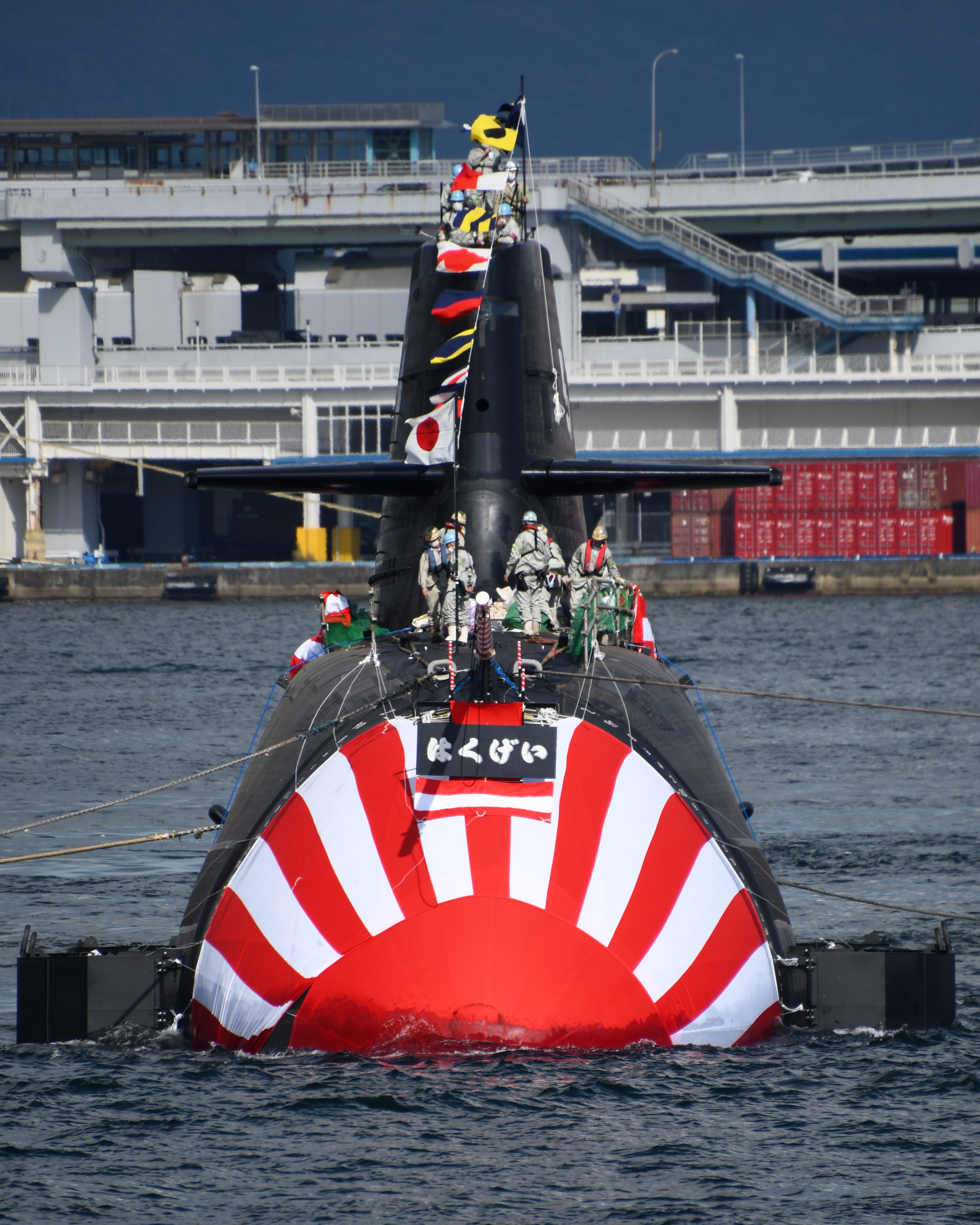
Bow of Hakugei
