= JS Raigei =

Taigei-class attack submarine

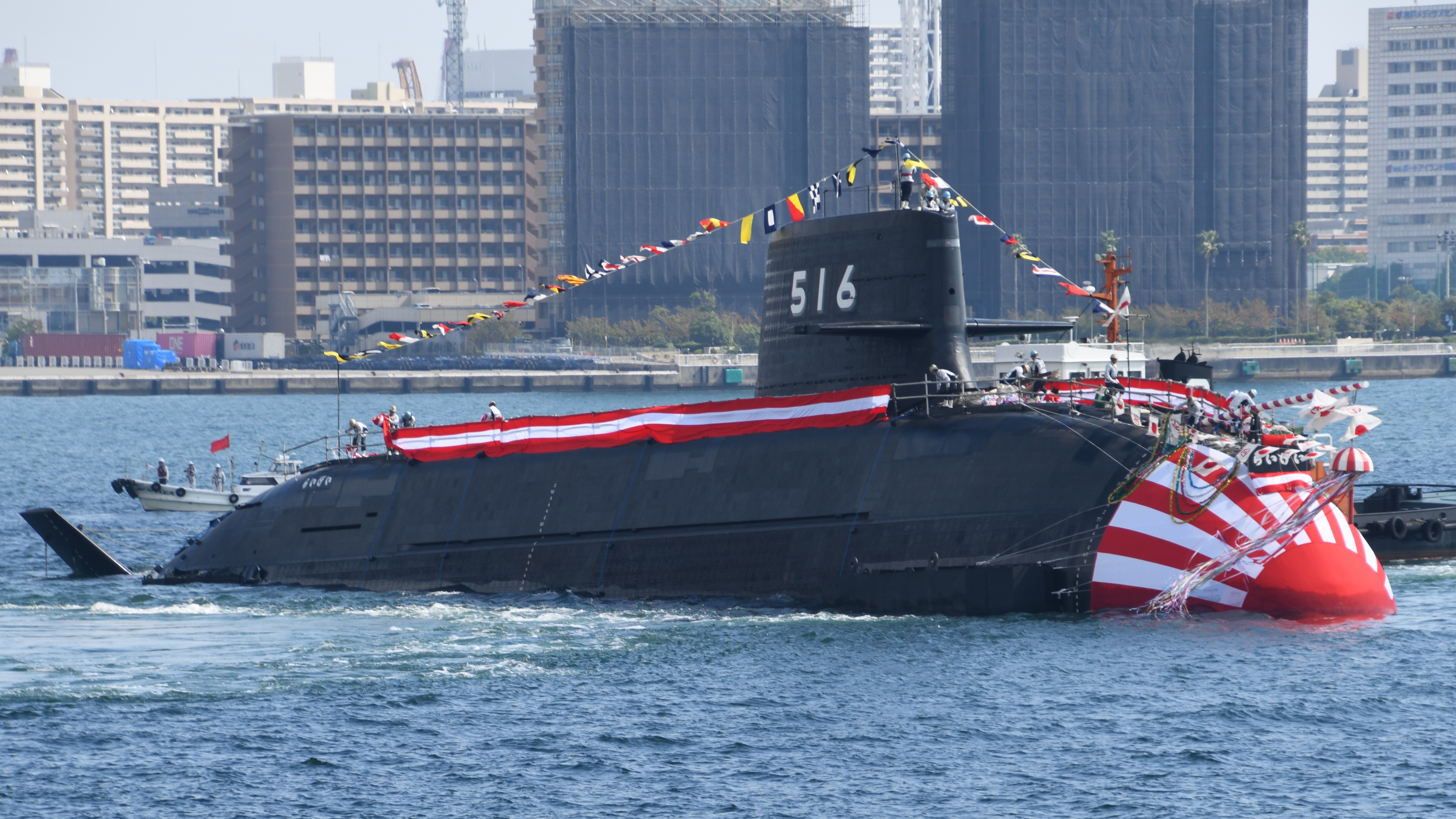
- Raigei during her launch ceremony

History

Japan
- Name: Raigei
- Ordered: 2020
- Builder: Kawasaki Heavy Industries Kobe Shipyard
- Cost: 70.2 billion yen
- Laid down: 26 March 2021
- Launched: 17 October 2023
- Commissioned: 8 March 2025
- Identification: Pennant number: SS-516
- Status: Active

General characteristics
- Class & type: Taigei-class submarine
- Displacement: 3,000 t (3,000 long tons; 3,300 short tons) (standard)
- Length: 84 m (275 ft 7 in)
- Beam: 9.1 m (29 ft 10 in)
- Depth: 10.4 m (34 ft 1 in)
- Installed power: 6,000 PS (4,400 kW; 5,900 hp)
- Propulsion: Diesel-electric transmission, lithium-ion batteries
- Crew: 70
- Sensors & processing systems: OYX-1 Information processing subsystem; ZQX-12; 1 × ZPS-6H surface search radar; ZQQ-8 Integrated Sonar
- Armament: 6 × HU-606 21 in (533 mm) torpedo tubes for: Type 89 torpedo or Type 18 torpedo; Harpoon (missile)

Raigei (らいげい ) is a diesel-electric submarine of the Japan Maritime Self-Defense Force, and the fourth boat of the Taigei class. Her name (in kanji as 雷鯨, literally meaning 'thunder whale') has not been used by the Imperial Japanese Navy, making Raigei the first naval vessel to be named in this manner. Like her older sister ships, Raigei will be fitted with dedicated living quarters for up to six female crew members from the time of commissioning. She is also the first boat to be fitted with the Kawasaki 12V 25/31 diesel engine.

== History ==
Raigei was laid down on 26 March 2021 at the Kawasaki Heavy Industries Kobe Shipyard as the fourth 3,000-ton submarine planned for the JMSDF's Mid-Term Defense Program. She was christened and launched at the same shipyard on 17 October 2023. After being fitted out and undergoing various sea trials, Raigei was commissioned on 6 March 2025, being deployed to the 1st Submarine Group in Kure.
