= JS Shōgei =

- Shōgei shortly after launching at MHI Kobe Shipyard, 8 October 2026

History

Japan
- Name: Shōgei
- Ordered: Fiscal year 2023
- Builder: Mitsubishi Heavy Industries Kobe Shipyard
- Cost: ¥80.5 billion
- Laid down: 17 April 2024
- Launched: 8 October 2026
- Commissioned: March 2028 (scheduled)
- Identification: Pennant number: SS-519
- Status: To be commissioned

General characteristics
- Class & type: Taigei-class submarine
- Displacement: 3,000 t (3,000 long tons) (standard)
- Length: 84 m (275 ft 7 in)
- Beam: 9.1 m (29 ft 10 in)
- Depth: 10.4 m (34 ft 1 in)
- Installed power: 6,000 PS (4,400 kW; 5,900 hp) (shaft output)
- Propulsion: Diesel-electric transmission, lithium-ion batteries; Single shaft screw propeller
- Speed: Approximately 20 kn (37 km/h; 23 mph)
- Crew: 70
- Sensors & processing systems: OYX-1 Information processing subsystem; ZQX-12; 1x ZPS-6H surface search radar; ZQQ-8 Integrated Sonar
- Armament: 6 × HU-606 21 in (533 mm) torpedo tubes for: 1.) Type 89 torpedo or Type 18 torpedo; 2.) Harpoon (missile)

JS Shōgei (Japanese: しょうげい; SS-519) is the seventh Taigei-class submarine of the Japan Maritime Self-Defense Force. Her name, written in kanji as 翔鯨, translates to "flying whale". She is the first naval vessel to bore that name, as the Imperial Japanese Navy had never used the name.

== Construction and career ==
Shōgei was laid down at Mitsubishi Heavy Industries' Kobe Shipyard as part of the Defense Buildup Program of the 2023 fiscal year, later being launched on 8 October 2026. The vessel would then undergo the fitting out process and sea trials, being scheduled to be commissioned in March 2028.
