= JS Sōgei =

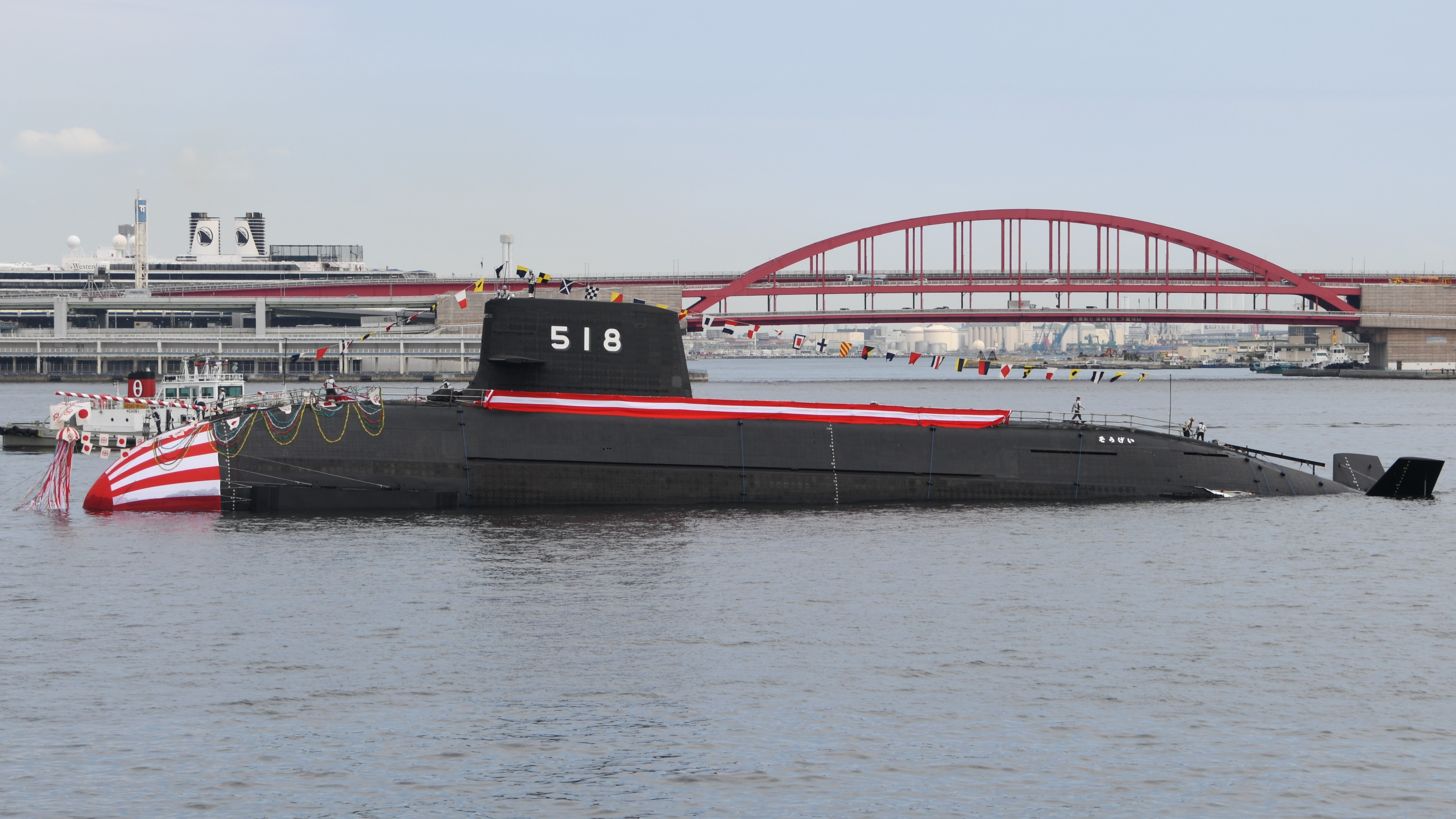
- Launching of Sōgei, 14 October 2025

History

Japan
- Name: Sōgei
- Ordered: Fiscal year 2022
- Builder: Kawasaki Heavy Industries Kobe Shipyard
- Cost: Approximately 73.6 billion yen
- Laid down: 28 March 2023
- Launched: 14 October 2025
- Commissioned: March 2027 (scheduled)
- Identification: Pennant number: SS-518
- Status: To be commissioned

General characteristics
- Class & type: Taigei-class submarine
- Displacement: 3,000 t (3,000 long tons) (standard)
- Length: 84 m (275 ft 7 in)
- Beam: 9.1 m (29 ft 10 in)
- Depth: 10.4 m (34 ft 1 in)
- Installed power: 6,000 PS (4,400 kW; 5,900 hp) (shaft output)
- Propulsion: Diesel-electric transmission, lithium-ion batteries; Single shaft screw propeller
- Speed: Approximately 20 kn (37 km/h; 23 mph)
- Crew: 70
- Sensors & processing systems: OYX-1 Information processing subsystem; ZQX-12; 1x ZPS-6H surface search radar; ZQQ-8 Integrated Sonar
- Armament: 6 × HU-606 21 in (533 mm) torpedo tubes for: 1.) Type 89 torpedo or Type 18 torpedo; 2.) Harpoon (missile)

JS Sōgei (Japanese: そうげい; Pennant number: SS-518) is a diesel-electric submarine of the Japan Maritime Self-Defense Force, and the sixth boat of the Taigei-class. Her name, written in kanji as "蒼鯨", translates to "blue whale". She is the first Japanese naval vessel to bore that name, as the Imperial Japanese Navy had not used the name.

== Construction and career ==
Sōgei was ordered in the fiscal year 2022 as part of JMSDF's Mid-Term Defense Program. She was laid down on 28 March 2023 at Kawasaki Heavy Industries' Kobe Shipyard, and launched on 14 October 2025. The vessel would then undergo a fitting out process and a period of sea trials, being scheduled to be commissioned in March 2027.
