= Taigei-class submarine =

Japanese attack submarine class

- Taigei-class profile

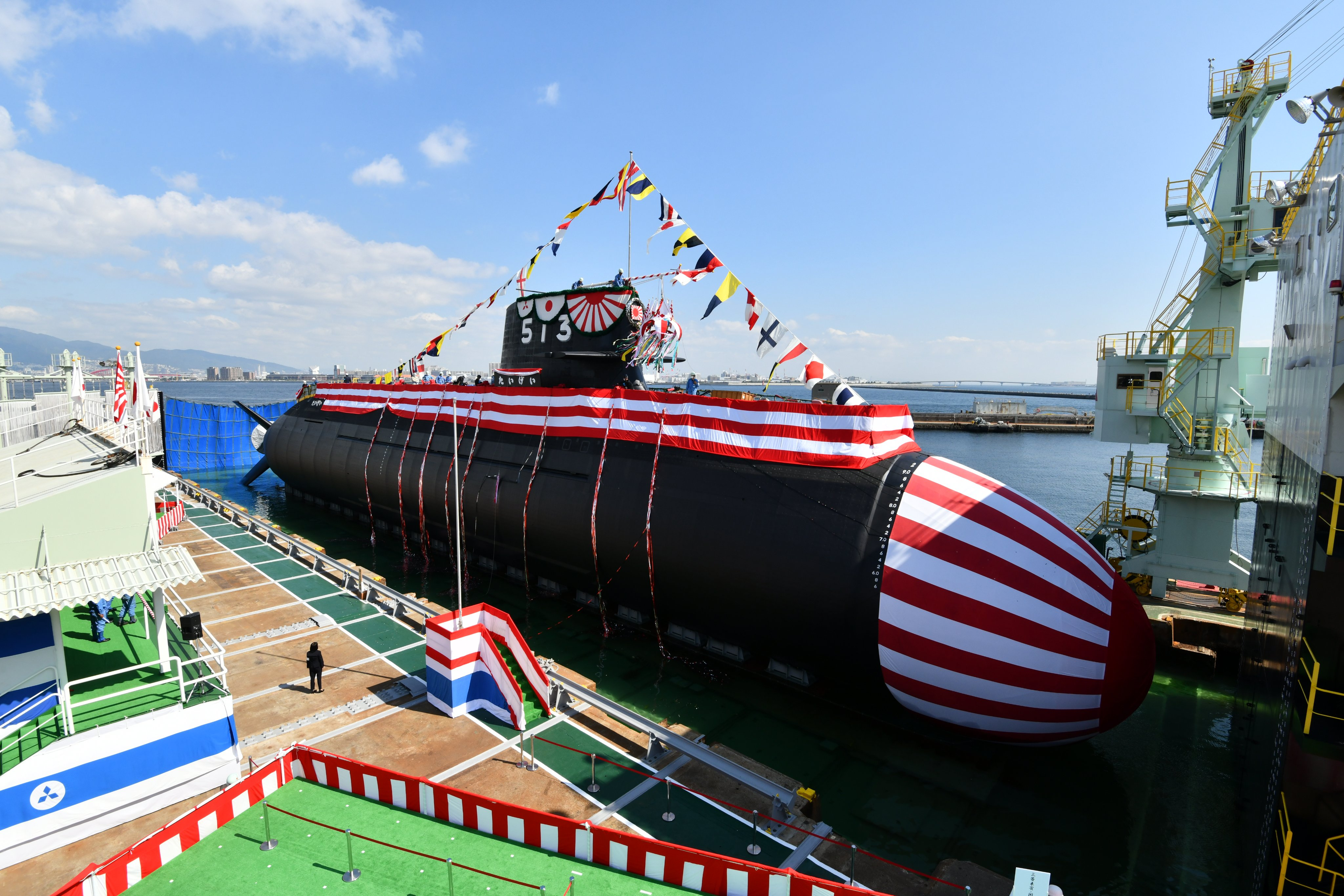
- JS Taigei

Class overview
- Name: Taigei class
- Builders: Mitsubishi Heavy Industries; Kawasaki Heavy Industries
- Operators: Japan Maritime Self-Defense Force
- Preceded by: Sōryū class
- Cost: ¥69.7 billion (Approx. US$ 635 million)
- Built: 2018-present
- In commission: 2022-present
- Planned: 10
- Building: 3
- Active: 5

General characteristics
- Type: Attack submarine
- Displacement: 3000 tonnes (surfaced)
- Length: 84.0 m (91.9 yd)
- Beam: 9.1 m (29 ft 10 in)
- Draught: 10.4 m (34 ft 1 in)
- Propulsion: Diesel-electric: 2 first ships: 2 × Kawasaki 25/25SB; Following ships: 2 × Kawasaki 12V 25/31; Batteries: lithium-ion; Propulsion:: 1 × electric motor; 1 × shaft; 1 × propeller
- Speed: 20.0 kn (37.0 km/h)
- Complement: 70
- Sensors & processing systems: Systems: OYX-1 processing system; ZQX-12 tactical display system; Sonar suite Oki ZQQ-8 (Mitsubishi Electric) that includes: Bow-mounted sonar; Flank-array sonar; Fibre-optic towed-array sonar: Periscopes: Non-penetrating optical periscope (Mitsubishi Electric); ESM: NZLR-2; Surface radar ZPS-6H
- Armament: Torpedoes: 6 × HU-606 533 mm (21.0 in) torpedo tubes with: Type 89 heavyweight torpedo; Type 18 heavyweight torpedo; Missiles: UGM-84L Harpoon Block II; Future weapon: Type 12 anti-ship missiles; Potential weapon: HGVP

The Taigei-class submarines (29SS; (Japanese: たいげい; "Big Whale") is a new class of attack submarines after 2022, developed for the Japan Maritime Self-Defense Force. It is the successor to the Sōryū class.

The Taigei class is equipped with a large amount of lithium-ion batteries, as is the case with the eleventh and twelfth submarines of the Sōryū class (Ōryū and Tōryū), making it possible for the submarine to travel longer and at higher speeds under water than conventional diesel-electric submarines.

== Development ==
The development of the Taigei class was conducted with the intent of developing new and improved technologies to improve the capabilities of next-generation submarines that will operate in the 2020s and beyond.

=== Early studies (2004) ===
In 2004, research began to explore the capabilities of the future Taigei class. The research involved simulations to optimize the most efficient design for the submarine and analyze cost-effectiveness. Research was conducted between 2005 and 2008, and in-house testing occurred between 2007 and 2009. A total of 800 million Yen were used to fund the project.

In 2005, evaluation and testing of next-generation submarine sonar and air-independent propulsion (AIP) system was initiated. A new sonar array was developed with reduced weight, power consumption, and detectability to meet the requirements of the improved low noise profile of future ships and submarines.

Further research on both components were carried out between 2006 and 2008, and tested between 2008 and 2009. A total of 1.5 billion yen and 2.5 billion yen was allocated for the sonar and AIP system projects.

=== Future equipment evaluation (2006) ===
In 2006, tests of anti-detection and shock-resistant submarine structures were conducted. Propeller and hull shape designs were researched to reduce noise generation while improving the submarine's structure for impact resistance. The research advocated for next-generation submarines to utilize a floating floor structure; where the deck is attached to the inner hull through a buffering mechanism designed to dampen vibrations from inside the submarine.

A secondary purpose of this buffering research is to protect against and mitigate shocks coming from outside the submarine. A prototype was developed between 2007 and 2011, and was tested from 2010 to 2014. A total of 400 million yen was allocated to fund the project.

=== Power systems (2009) ===
In 2009, research on snorkel power generation system and sonar system were evaluated. The new snorkel power generation system aimed to be more compact, quiet and generate higher power output to enhance the submarines operability, survivability, and stealth. Comparable alternative power generation systems that were examined include the MTU 16V396SE diesel engines used on the Type 212 submarine and SEMT Pielstick PA4V200SM diesel engine. However, both engines were deemed to be not powerful enough, so the development of a new power generation system was initiated.

The sonar system was developed to improve detection and information processing capabilities for the next-generation submarine to for shallow-water use. The snorkel power generation prototype was developed between 2010 and 2014, and tested between 2014 and 2015. The prototype for the sonar system was developed between 2010 and 2013 and tested between 2013 and 2014. A total of 1.3 billion yen was allocated to fund the snorkel power generation system project, and 4.9 billion yen for the sonar system.

=== Structure and hull (2012) ===
In 2012, research on the structural mode for submarines was conducted. Typically when adding new equipment onto an existing submarine design the solution to integrate it is to extend the compartment length of the submarine; which in turn increases the size, reinforcing of materials and price. The purpose of the research was to reduce future submarine size and price by optimizing the structural mode of the pressure shell of a submarine and to obtain technical data to develop future submarine designs.

A research prototype was developed between 2013 and 2015, and in-house testing was conducted between 2014 and 2015. A total of 1.1 billion yen was used to fund the research.

In 2016, proposed research on new hull design to reduce fluid noise and a new sonar system to cope with the quietness of future foreign ships and submarines was evaluated. The research into the reduction of fluid noise investigated reducing interference noise from the hull and propeller and reduce low frequency noise components caused by flow around the hull and the propeller. The evaluation into the new sonar system anticipated that foreign surface ships and submarines operating in the 2030s will improve their quietness and operate in complex and diverse marine environments; thus improvements in detection and tracking capabilities were researched. The first research was commenced between 2017 and 2020, while testing occurs between 2019 and 2022. Development of a new sonar system is researched between 2017 and 2020, followed by immediate testing in 2020. A total of 1.2 billion yen were used to research the new hull design, while 5.1 billion yen were used to research the sonar system.

=== Silent drive and power storage (2017) ===
In 2017, research on a silent drive system was initiated. Research was conducted between 2018 and 2021 and was tested between 2021 and 2022. A total of 5.7 billion yen were allocated for this project.

In 2018, research on high-efficiency power storage and supply systems was conducted. The project aimed to improve the efficiency and energy of the power storage and supply system by achieving high efficiency and miniaturization in the power supply system and increasing the capacity and density of the power storage system. Prototyping occurred between 2019 and 2022, and in-house testing to simulate the installation on a submarine occurred in 2023. A total of 4.4 billion yen was used in its development.

== Design ==
The hull design of the Taigei class is said to not differ too much from the Sōryū class but will be 100 tons heavier than its predecessor. However, the Taigei-class submarines will be more advanced as they are equipped with newer equipment such as sonar systems, snorkel power generation system. The Taigei class will use lithium-ion batteries much like the JS Ōryū and JS Tōryū submarines. The submarines use the Type 18 torpedo (ja), a successor to the Type 89 torpedo.

== Operational use ==
The first submarine of this class, Taigei, was converted to a dedicated test submarine in 2024, so that the JMSDF would not need to use commissioned submarines from frontline service to conduct tests. By doing so, the JMSDF can increase operating days and strengthen monitoring activities with their attack submarines, while the test submarine allows accelerated research and development.

== Boats ==
Building no.	Name (name in Japanese)	Namesake	Pennant No.	Shipyard	Laid down	Launched	Commissioned	Home port	Notes
8128	Taigei (たいげい)	Big Whale	SS-513; SSE-6201	MHI - Kobe	16 Mar 2018	14 Oct 2020	9 Mar 2022	Yokosuka	
8129	Hakugei (はくげい)	White Whale	SS-514	KHI Kobe	25 Jan 2019	14 Oct 2021	20 Mar 2023	Kure	
8130	Jingei (じんげい)	Swift Whale	SS-515	MHI Kobe	24 Apr 2020	12 Oct 2022	8 Mar 2024	Yokosuka	
8131	Raigei (らいげい)	Thunder Whale	SS-516	KHI Kobe	26 Mar 2021	17 Oct 2023	6 Mar 2025	Kure	
8132	Chōgei (ちょうげい)	Long Whale	SS-517	MHI Kobe	19 Apr 2022	4 Oct 2024	10 Mar 2026	Yokosuka	
8133	Sōgei (そうげい)	Blue Whale	SS-518	KHI Kobe	28 Mar 2023	14 Oct 2025	Mar 2027	TBA	
8134	Shōgei (しょうげい)	Soaring Whale	SS-519	MHI Kobe	17 Apr 2024	8 Oct 2026	Mar 2028	TBA	
8135	TBA (–)	–	SS-520	KHI Kobe	19 Dec 2024	2027	Mar 2029	TBA	
8136	TBA (–)	–	SS-521	MHI Kobe	2026	2028	Mar 2030	TBA	
8137	TBA (–)	–	SS-522	KHI Kobe	2026	2029	Mar 2031	TBA	

Planned dates

== Successor ==
Kawasaki Heavy Industries (KHI) received a research and development (R&D) contract from the Ministry of Defense on December 29, 2023 to design a new diesel-electric submarine (SSK) class.

== See also ==
- List of submarine classes in service

Equivalent submarines of the same era

- Jang Yeongsil class
- Type 039C
- S-80 Plus
- Type 212CD
- Dakar class
