= JS Chōgei =

Taigei-class attack submarine

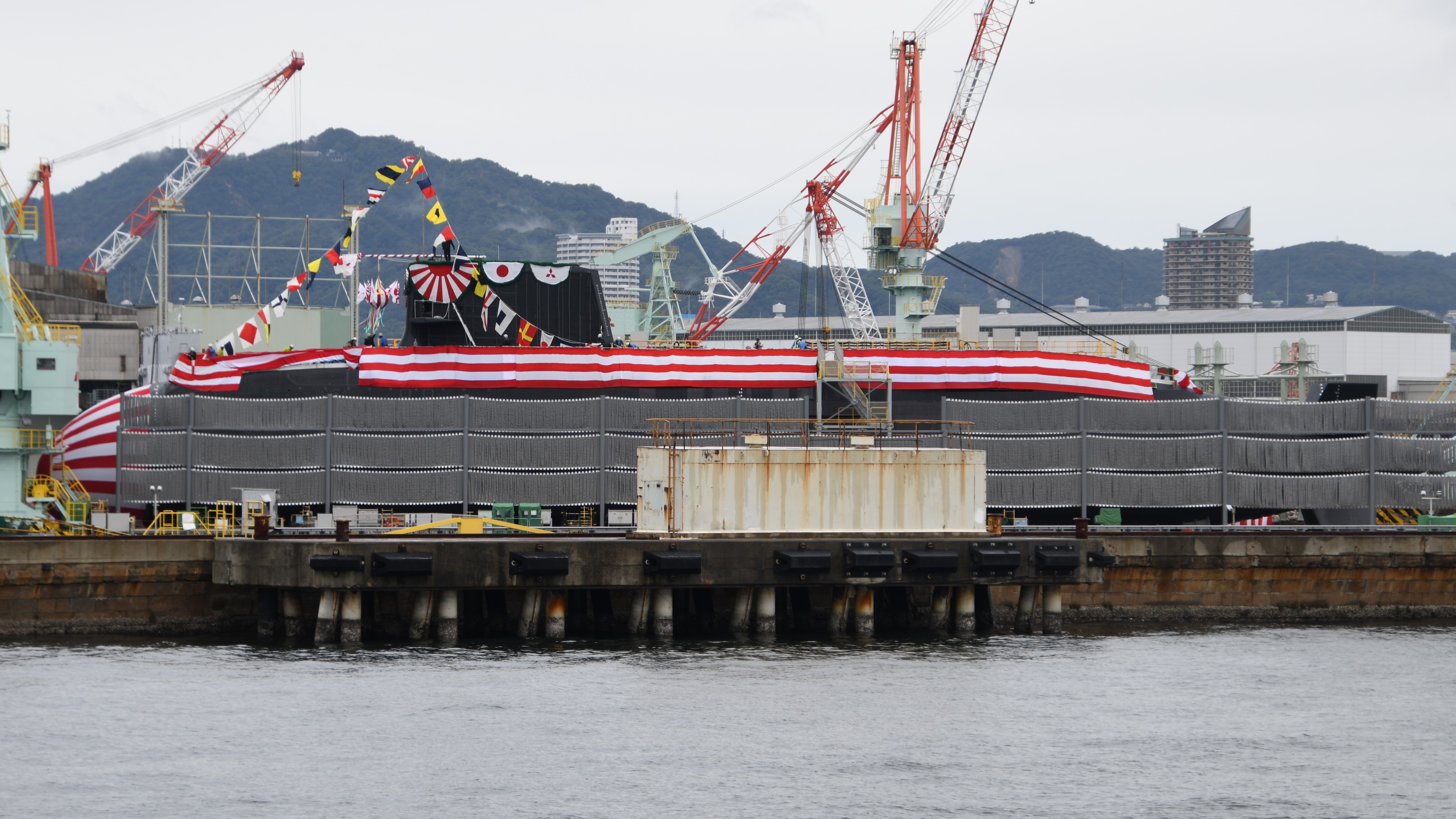
- Chōgei before being launched, 4 October 2024

History

Japan
- Name: Chōgei
- Builder: Mitsubishi Heavy Industries Kobe Shipyard
- Cost: 68.4 billion yen
- Laid down: 19 April 2022
- Launched: 4 October 2024
- Commissioned: 10 March 2026
- Identification: Pennant number: SS-517
- Status: Active

General characteristics
- Class & type: Taigei-class submarine
- Displacement: 3,000 t (3,000 long tons) (standard)
- Length: 84 m (275 ft 7 in)
- Beam: 9.1 m (29 ft 10 in)
- Depth: 10.4 m (34 ft 1 in)
- Installed power: 6,000 PS (4,400 kW; 5,900 hp) (shaft output)
- Propulsion: Diesel-electric transmission, lithium-ion batteries
- Crew: 70
- Sensors & processing systems: OYX-1 Information processing subsystem; ZQX-12; 1x ZPS-6H surface search radar; ZQQ-8 Integrated Sonar
- Armament: 6 × HU-606 21 in (533 mm) torpedo tubes for: 1.) Type 89 torpedo or Type 18 torpedo; 2.) Harpoon (missile)

Chōgei (ちょうげい) is a diesel-electric submarine of the Japan Maritime Self-Defense Force, and the fifth and final member of the Taigei class. Her name is written in kanji as "長鯨", literally meaning "giant whale", and this is the third use of the name, after the Meiji-era steamboat Chōgei Maru, and the Imperial Japanese Navy's Jingei-class submarine tender Chōgei.

== Construction and career ==
Chōgei was laid down on 19 April 2022 at Mitsubishi Heavy Industries Kobe Shipyard as part of the JMSDF's Mid-Term Defense Program of 2021, and was launched on 4 October 2024 after being christened. After being fitted out and underwent various trials, the vessel was handed over to the Japan Maritime Self-Defense Force for commissioning on 10 March 2026.
