= JS Tōryū =

Japanese submarine

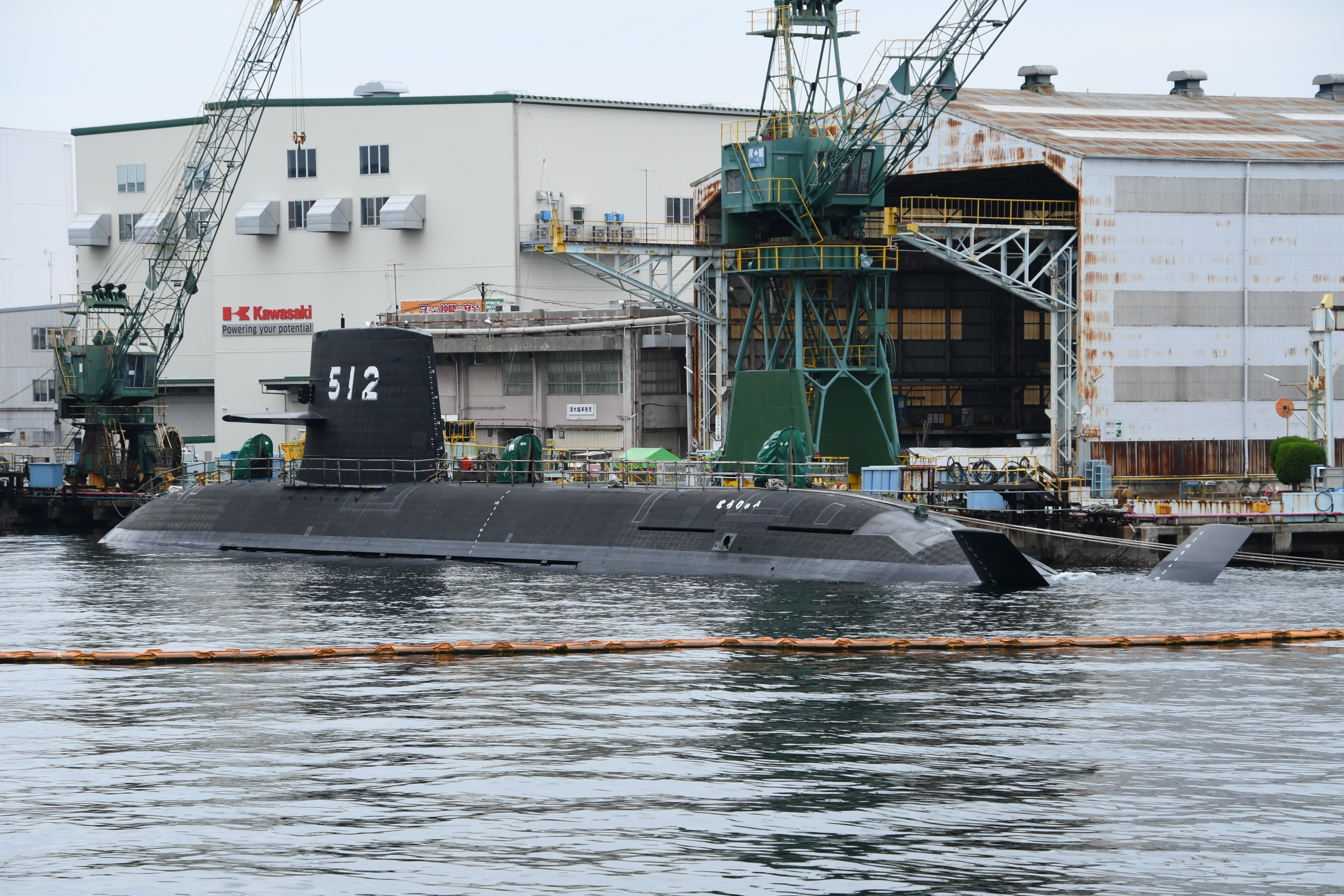
- JS Tōryū fitting out on 4 October 2020

History

Japan
- Name: Tōryū; (とうりゅう)
- Namesake: Tōryū-nada (闘竜灘)
- Ordered: 2016
- Builder: Kawasaki Heavy Industries
- Cost: ¥69 billion
- Laid down: 27 January 2017
- Launched: 6 November 2019
- Commissioned: 24 March 2021
- Identification: SS-512
- Status: Active

General characteristics
- Class & type: Sōryū-class attack submarine
- Displacement: Surfaced: 2,900 tonnes (2,854 long tons); Submerged: 4,200 t (4,134 long tons)
- Length: 84.0 m (275 ft 7 in)
- Beam: 9.1 m (29 ft 10 in)
- Draught: 8.5 m (27 ft 11 in)
- Propulsion: 1-shaft 2× Kawasaki 12V 25/25 SB-type diesel engines diesel-electric; Lithium-ion battery; 3,900 hp (2,900 kW) surfaced; 8,000 hp (6,000 kW) submerged
- Speed: Surfaced: 13 kn (24 km/h; 15 mph); Submerged: 20 kn (37 km/h; 23 mph)
- Range: Unspecified; no AIP installed. For Sōryū-class, with AIP — endurance (est.): 6,100 nautical miles (11,300 km; 7,000 mi) at 6.5 kn (12.0 km/h; 7.5 mph)
- Complement: 65 (9 officers, 56 enlisted)
- Sensors & processing systems: ZPS-6F surface/low-level air search radar; Hughes/Oki ZQQ-7 Sonar suite: 1× bow-array, 4× LF flank arrays and 1× Towed array sonar
- Electronic warfare & decoys: ZLR-3-6 ESM equipment; 2× 3-inch underwater countermeasure launcher tubes for launching of Acoustic Device Countermeasures (ADCs)
- Armament: 6 × HU-606 21 in (533 mm) torpedo tubes with 30 reloads for: 1.) Type 89 torpedo; 2.) Harpoon (missile); Mines

JS Tōryū (SS-512) is the twelfth boat of Sōryū-class submarines of the Japan Maritime Self-Defense Force. She was commissioned on 24 March 2021.

== Construction and career ==
Tōryū was laid down on 27 January 2017, at Kawasaki Heavy Industries Kobe Works as the 2016 plan 2900 ton type submarine No. 8127 based on the medium-term defense capability development plan (23 medium-term defense), and launched on 6 November 2019. The naming and launching ceremony was held on that day.

Tōryū is the second submarine in her class to follow the lead of the Ōryū. Both bear the distinction of being the first and second submarines launched with lithium-ion batteries, which replaced the AIP Stirling engine system used in the other boats of the Sōryū-class submarines.

From 9 October to 26 December 2022, Tōryū participated in the U.S. Submarine Exercise, conducting anti-submarine warfare training in waters near Japan and the Hawaiian Islands, and at Joint Base Pearl Harbor-Hickam in Hawaii.

== Gallery ==
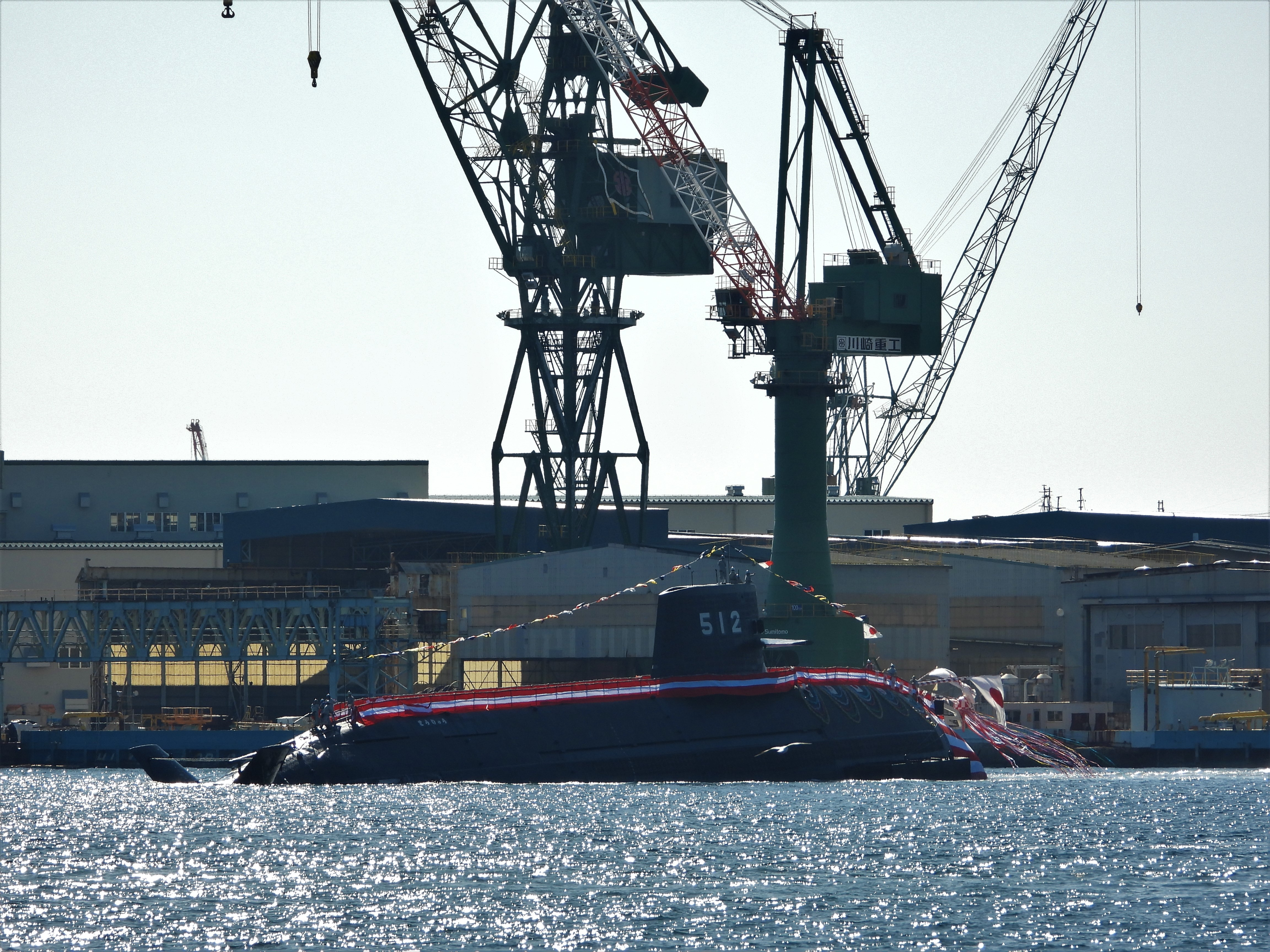
JS Tōryū on 6 November 2019.

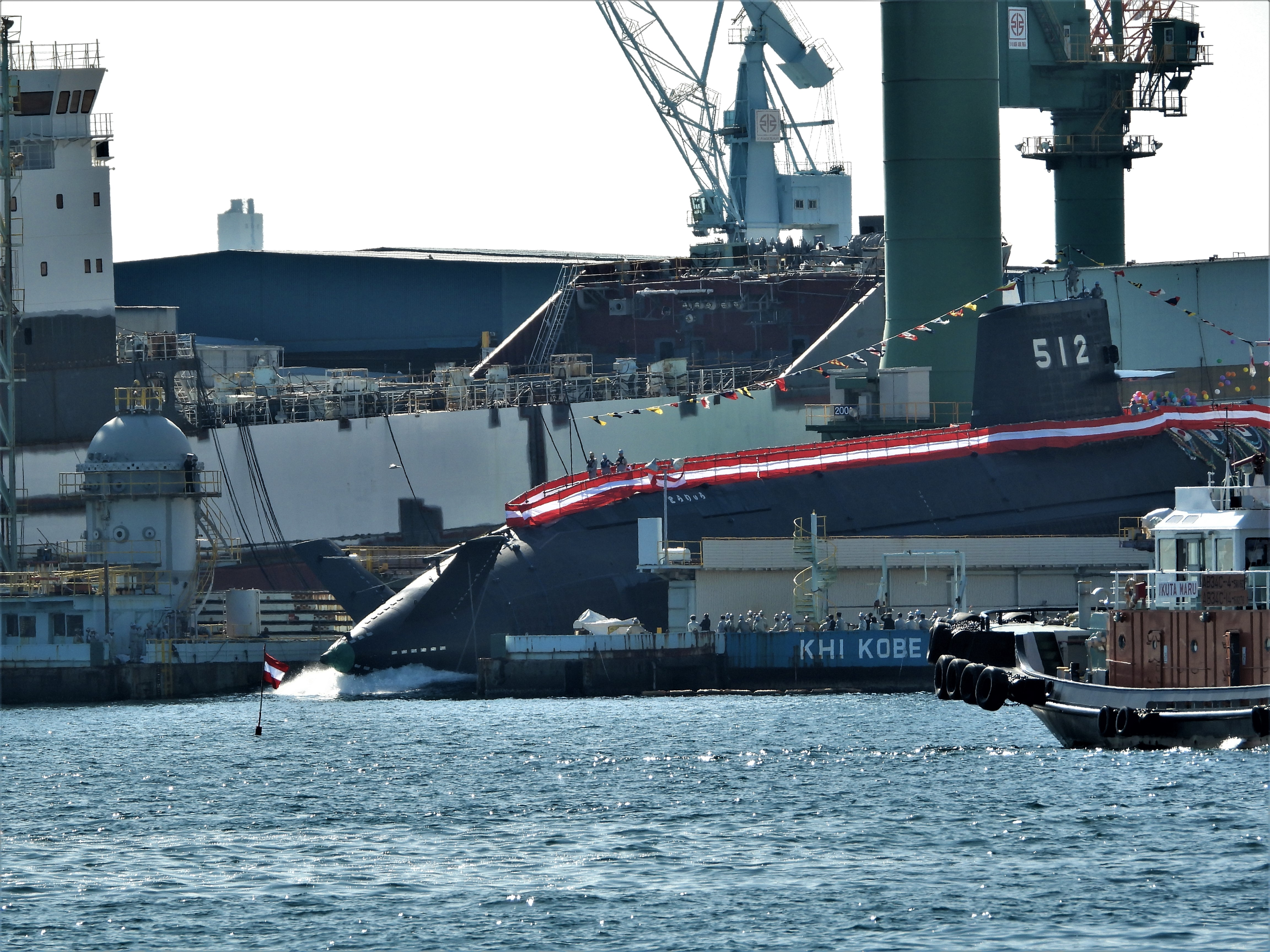
JS Tōryū on 6 November 2019.

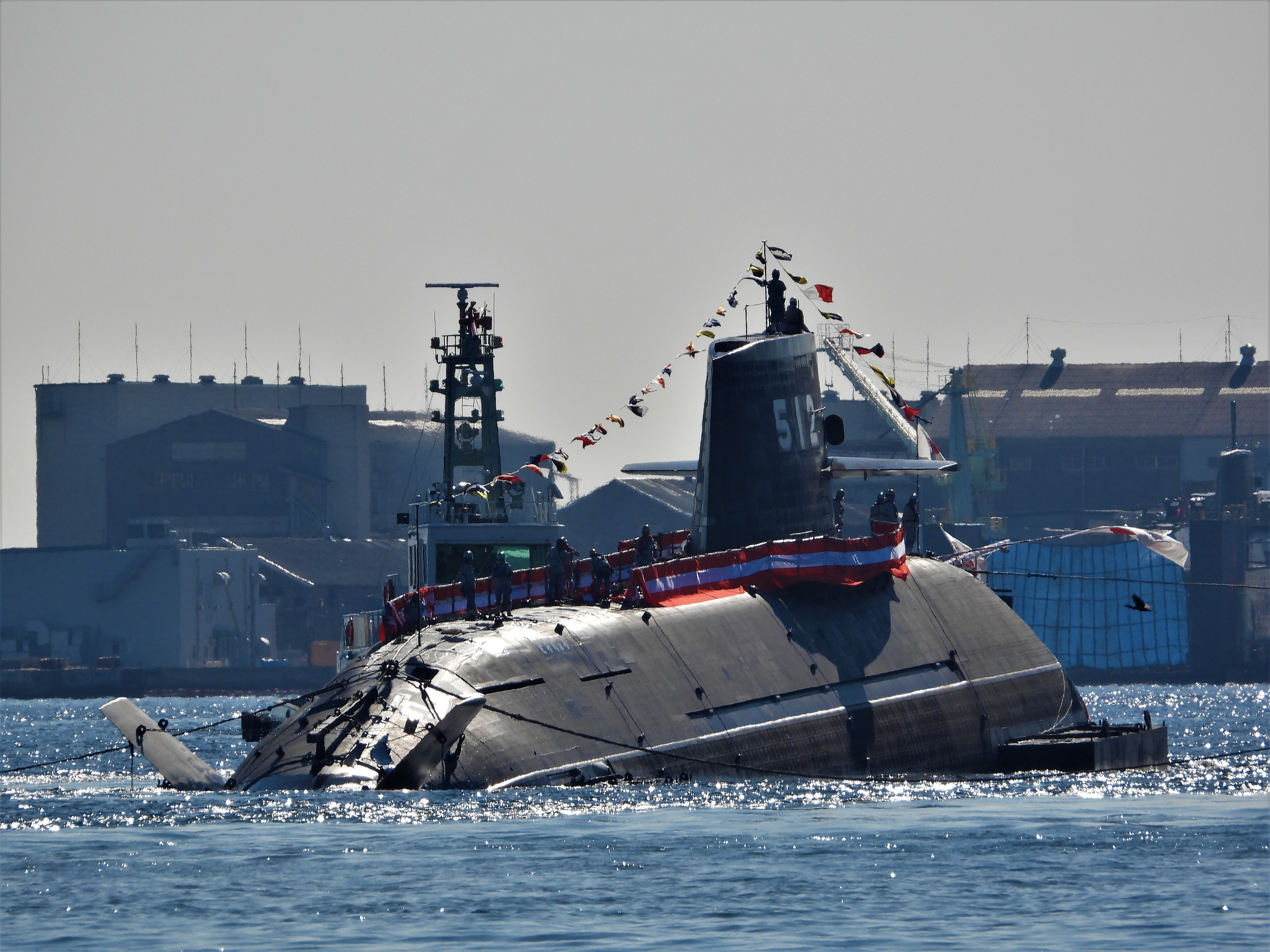
JS Tōryū on 6 November 2019.

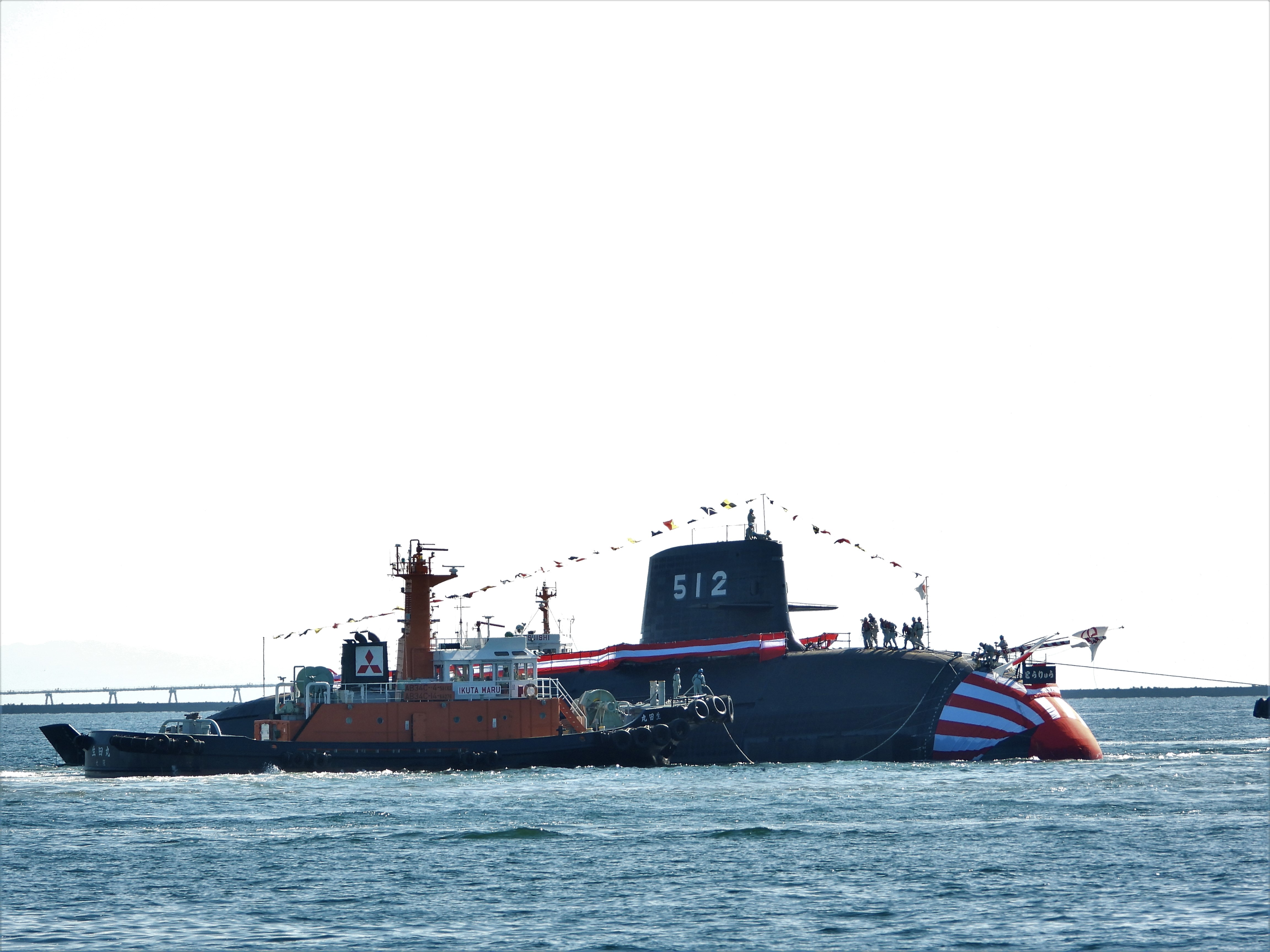
JS Tōryū on 6 November 2019.

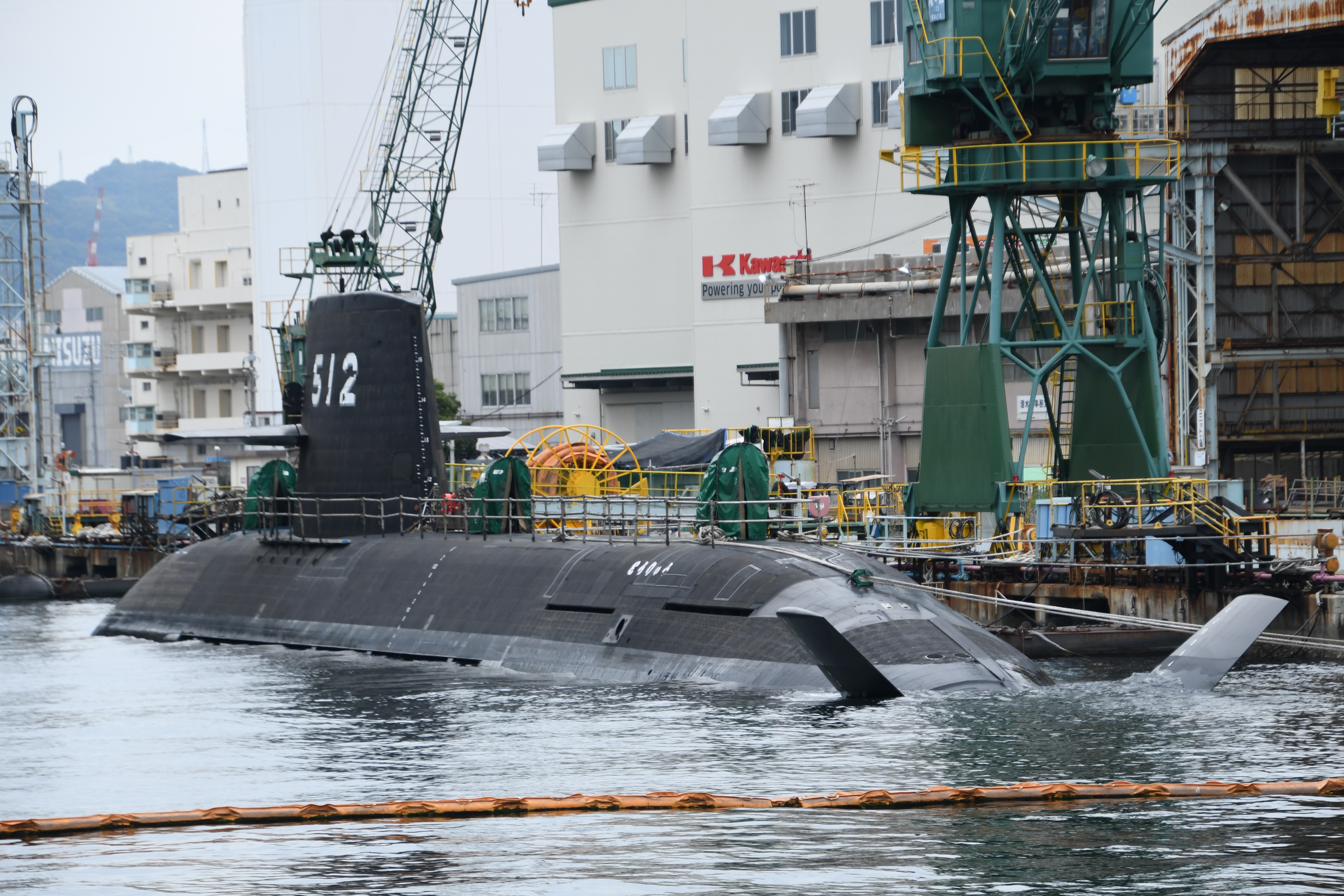
JS Tōryū fitting out on 4 October 2020.

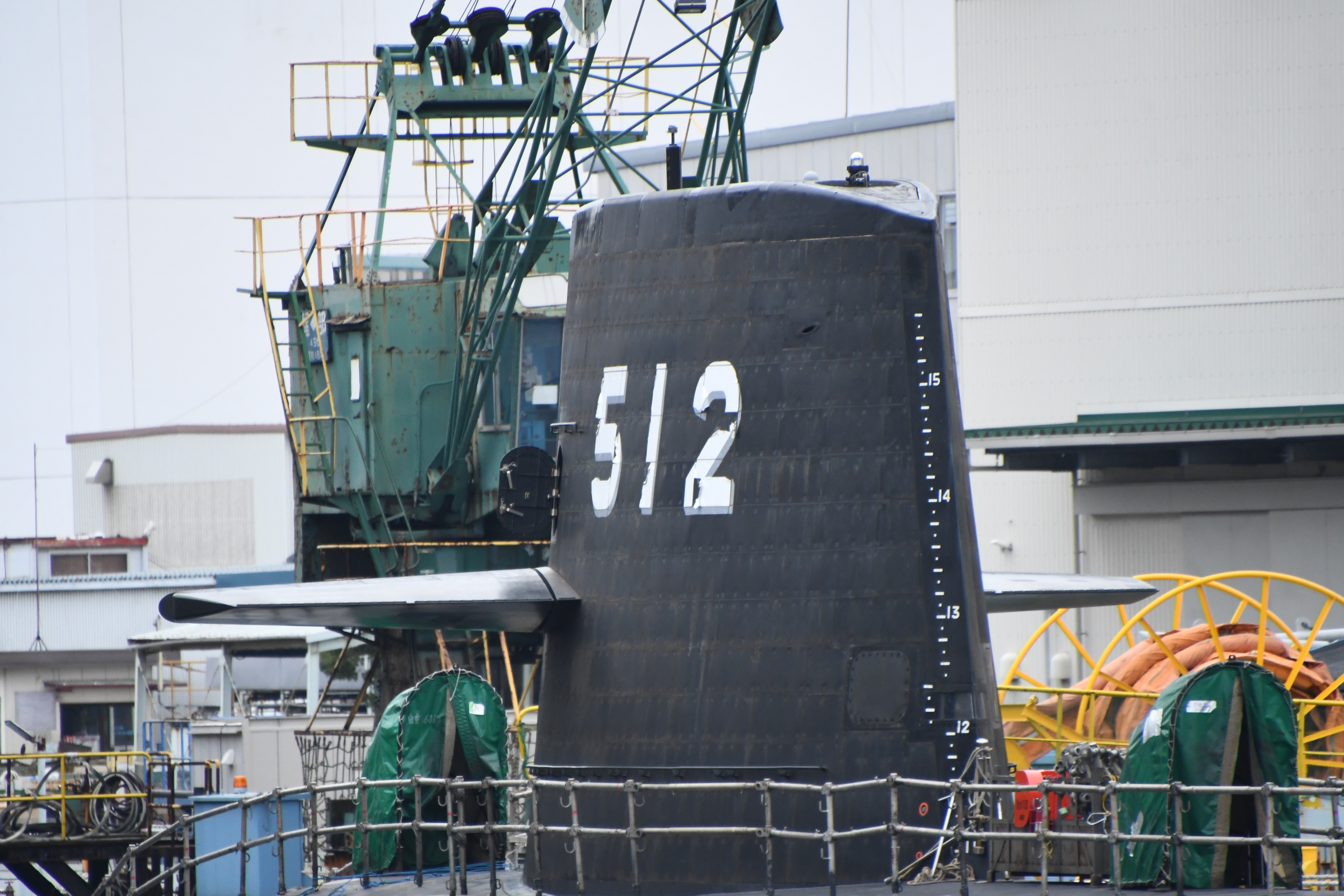
JS Tōryū fitting out on 4 October 2020.
