= Japanese warship Jingei =

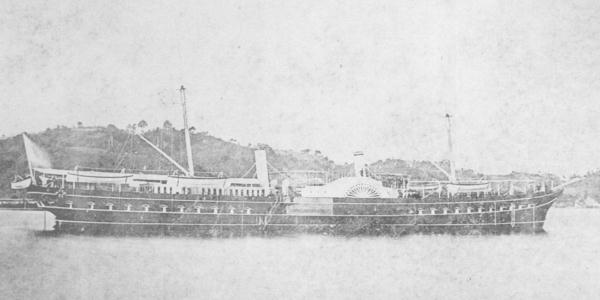
- Jingei around 1882

History

Empire of Japan
- Name: Jingei
- Builder: Yokosuka Naval Arsenal, Japan
- Laid down: 26 September 1873
- Launched: 4 September 1876
- Commissioned: 5 August 1881
- Stricken: 2 December 1903
- Fate: Sold 25 January 1909

General characteristics
- Displacement: 1,465 long tons (1,489 t)
- Length: 76.0 m (249 ft 4 in)
- Beam: 9.75 m (32 ft 0 in)
- Draft: 4.42 m (14 ft 6 in)
- Propulsion: reciprocating steam engine; 1,450 hp (1,080 kW); 2 side paddles
- Sail plan: 2 masts
- Speed: 12 knots (14 mph; 22 km/h)
- Complement: 170
- Armament: 4 × 4.7 inch breech-loading cannon

Jingei (迅鯨, Swift Whale) was a wooden-hulled paddle steamer warship of the early Imperial Japanese Navy. Already obsolete by the time of its completion, it was used primarily as the Imperial yacht, and later as a training vessel.

== Background ==
Jingei was designed by Léonce Verny, a French naval engineer initially hired by the Tokugawa shogunate, who stayed on as a foreign advisor to the early Meiji government as chief administrator and constructor of the Yokosuka Naval Arsenal. The steam-powered vessel with two side paddle-wheels was laid down at Yokosuka Naval Arsenal on 26 September 1873 and was the first vessel to be laid down at that shipyard; however, due to the lack of local technical expertise and the need to create the infrastructure to support her construction, she took a total of seven years and ten months to complete. She was launched on 4 September 1876 (six months after Verny had departed Japan) and commissioned on 5 August 1881 with Lieutenant Commander Tsuboi Kōzō as her first captain, and Lieutenant Tōgō Heihachirō as her executive officer.

== Operational history ==
Initially intended to serve as an ocean-going imperial yacht, Jingei was completed with luxurious internal fittings. However, Emperor Meiji showed little interest in travelling by sea, and the vessel was seldom used.

On 15 April 1882, Jingei accidentally rammed the American survey vessel USS Alert which was steaming in Kii Channel en route from Kobe to Yokohama. Although the night was clear and both vessels had their running lights in sight of each other for an hour, Jingei inexplicably turned hard to starboard just as the vessels passed each other, gashing a large hole in the side of USS Alert. Jingei suffered only minor damage, but Alert took two months to complete repairs.

On 29 January 1886, she was designated as a mine-warfare training vessel. On 1 April 1896, she was re-designated as a utility vessel, however continued to be used as a training vessel, and for the development of naval mines. She was removed from the navy list on 2 December 1903. Her hulk was subsequently sold on 25 January 1909.
