= JS Ōryū =

2018 Sōryū-class submarine

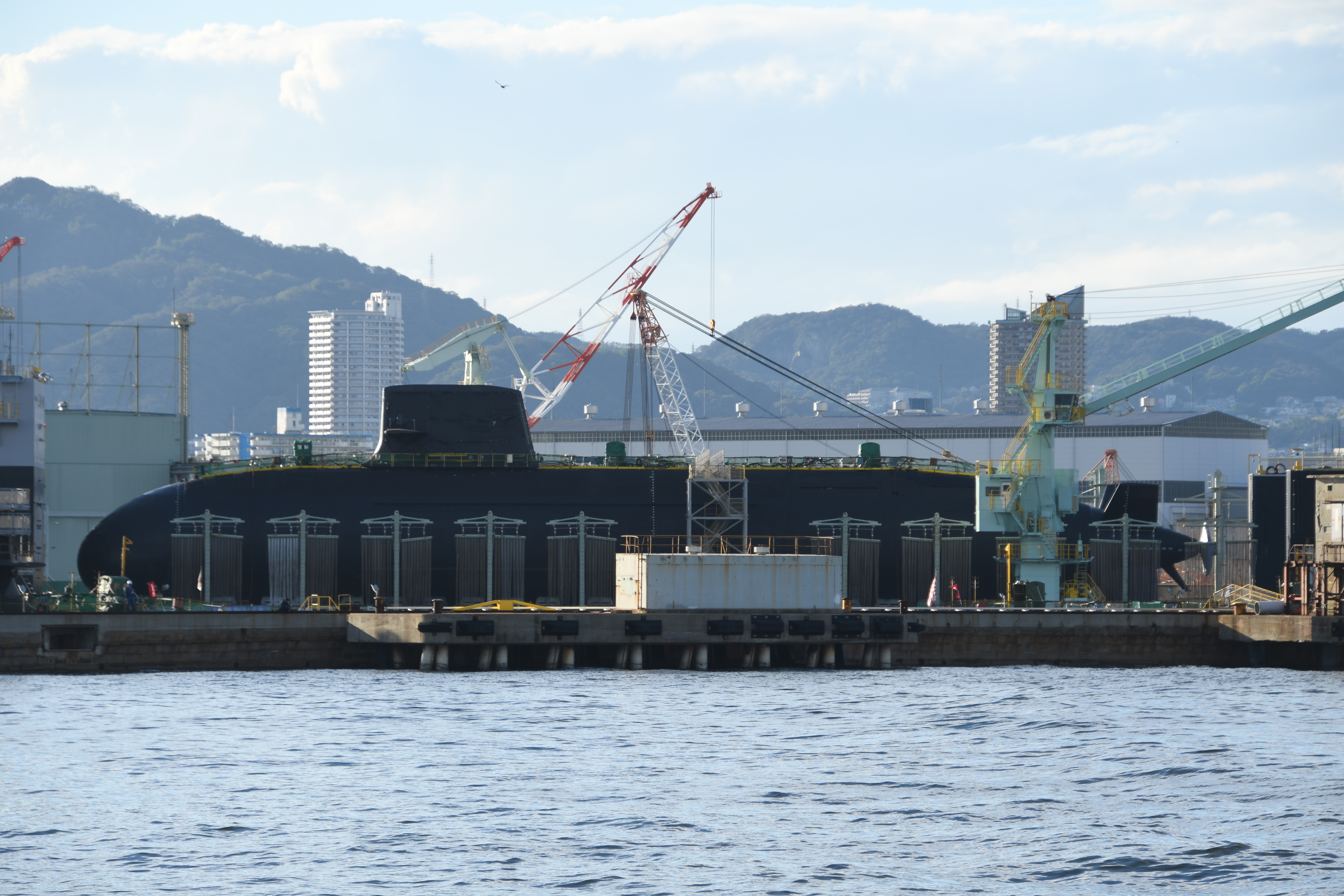
- JS Ōryū on 7 October 2018

History

Japan
- Name: Ōryū; (おうりゅう)
- Namesake: Knowledgeable dragon (凰龍)
- Ordered: 2015
- Builder: Kawasaki Heavy Industries
- Cost: ¥69 billion
- Laid down: 16 November 2015
- Launched: 4 October 2018
- Commissioned: 5 March 2020
- Home port: Kure
- Identification: SS-511
- Status: Active

General characteristics
- Class & type: Sōryū-class attack submarine
- Displacement: Surfaced: 2,900 tonnes (2,854 long tons); Submerged: 4,200 t (4,134 long tons)
- Length: 84.0 m (275 ft 7 in)
- Beam: 9.1 m (29 ft 10 in)
- Draught: 8.5 m (27 ft 11 in)
- Propulsion: 1-shaft 2× Kawasaki 12V 25/25 SB-type diesel engines diesel-electric; Lithium-ion battery; 3,900 hp (2,900 kW) surfaced; 8,000 hp (6,000 kW) submerged
- Speed: Surfaced: 13 kn (24 km/h; 15 mph); Submerged: 20 kn (37 km/h; 23 mph)
- Range: Unspecified; no AIP installed. For Sōryū-class, with AIP — endurance (est.): 6,100 nautical miles (11,300 km; 7,000 mi) at 6.5 knots (12.0 km/h; 7.5 mph)
- Complement: 65 (9 officers, 56 enlisted)
- Sensors & processing systems: ZPS-6F surface/low-level air search radar; Hughes/Oki ZQQ-7 Sonar suite: 1× bow-array, 4× LF flank arrays and 1× Towed array sonar
- Electronic warfare & decoys: ZLR-3-6 ESM equipment; 2× 3-inch underwater countermeasure launcher tubes for launching of Acoustic Device Countermeasures (ADCs)
- Armament: 6 × HU-606 21 in (533 mm) torpedo tubes with 30 reloads for: 1.) Type 89 torpedo; 2.) Harpoon (missile); Mines

JS Ōryū (SS-511) is the eleventh boat of Sōryū-class submarines, operated by the Japan Maritime Self-Defense Force. She was commissioned on 5 March 2020.

== Construction and career ==
Ōryū was laid down at Mitsubishi Heavy Industries Kobe Shipyard on November 16, 2015, as the 2015 plan 2900 ton type submarine No. 8126 based on the medium-term defense capability development plan (23 medium-term defense). In October 2018, the submarine was named and launched on 4 October. The delivery ceremony and the self-defense ship flag awarding ceremony were held on 5 March 2020, and it was commissioned. It was incorporated into the 1st Submarine Flotilla and deployed at Kure Naval Base.

Ōryū bears the distinction of being the first submarine launched with Lithium-ion batteries, which replaced the AIP Stirling engine system used in the other submarines of the Sōryū-class submarines.

== Gallery ==
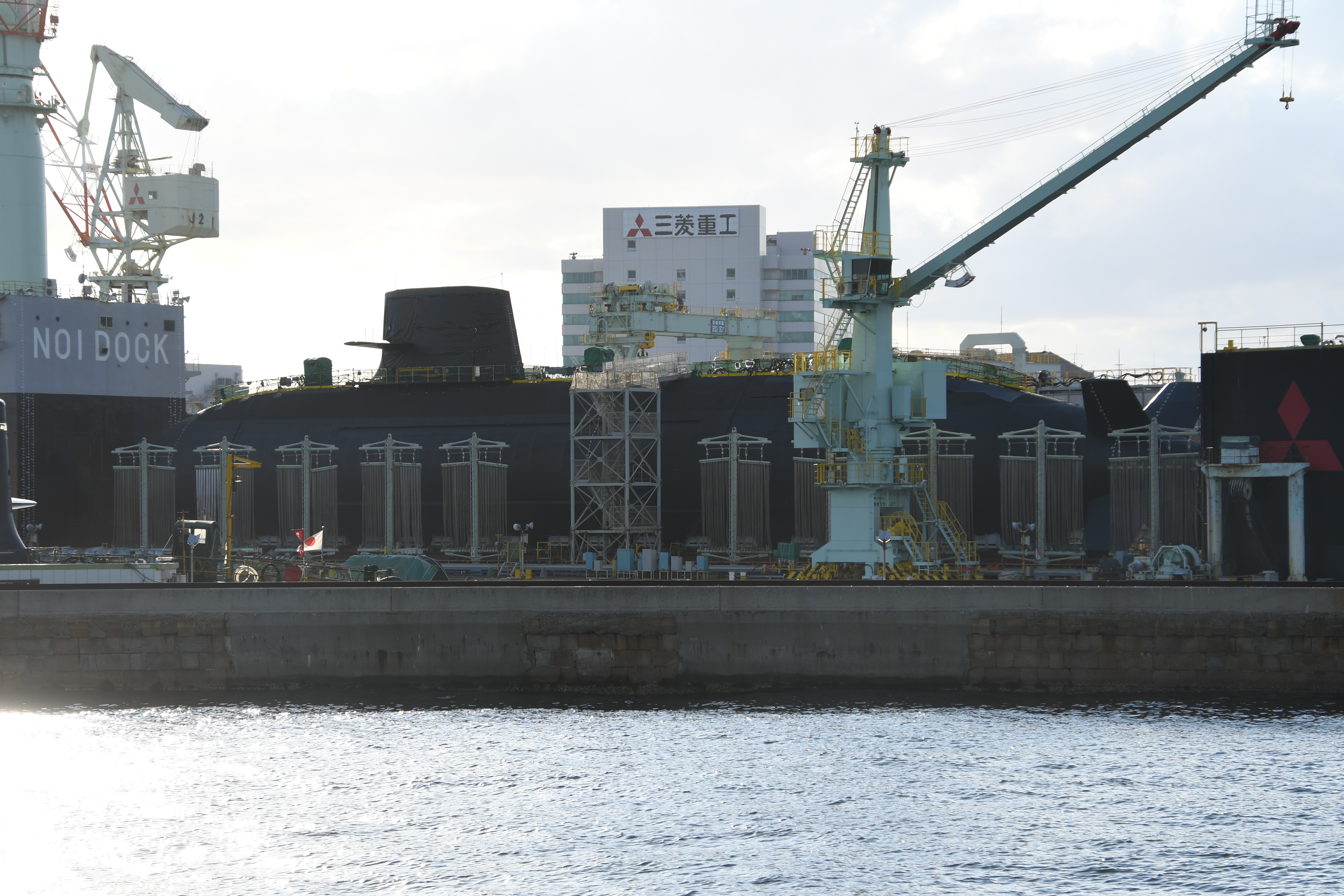
JS Ōryū at Kobe on 7 October 2018.

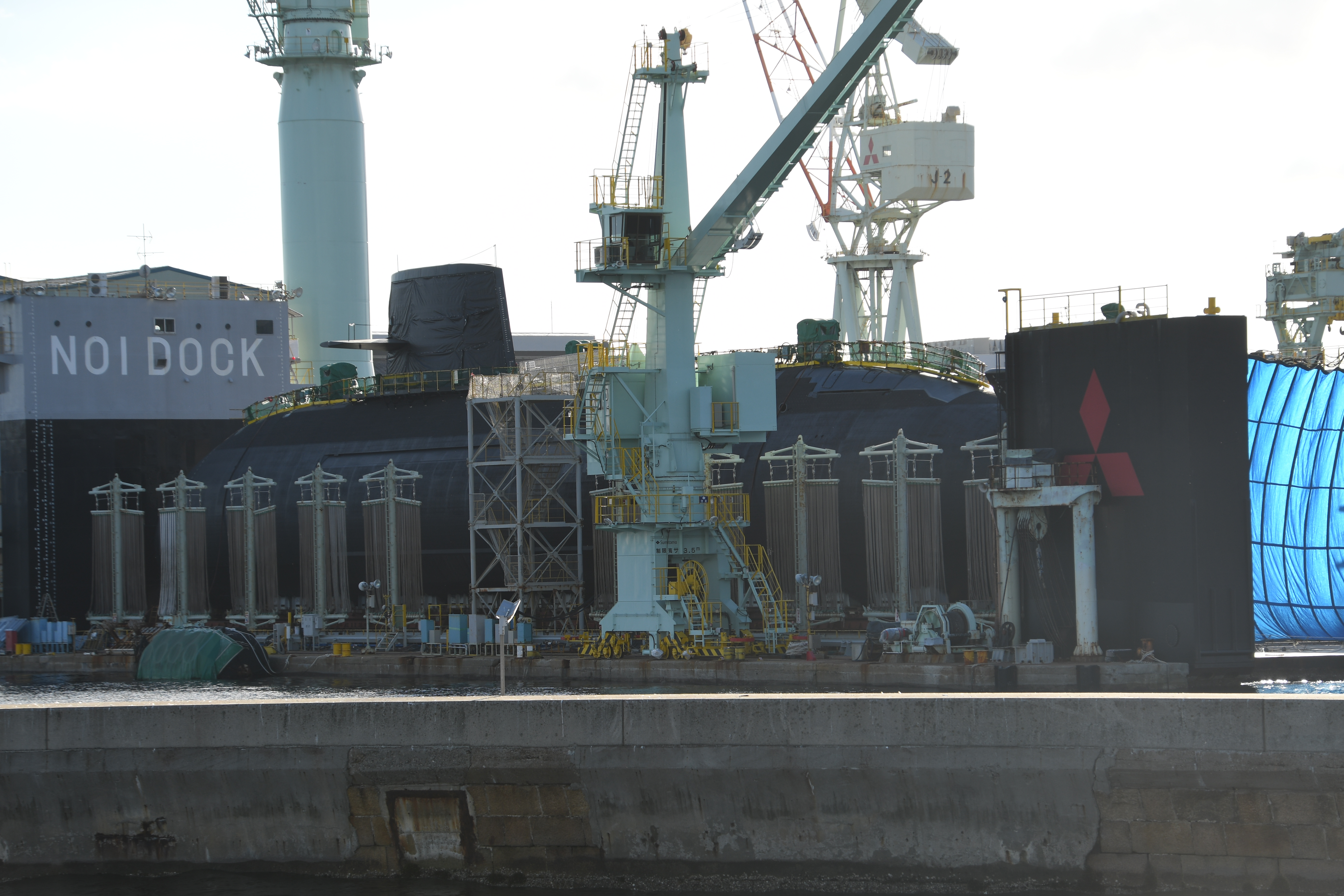
JS Ōryū at Kobe on 7 October 2018.

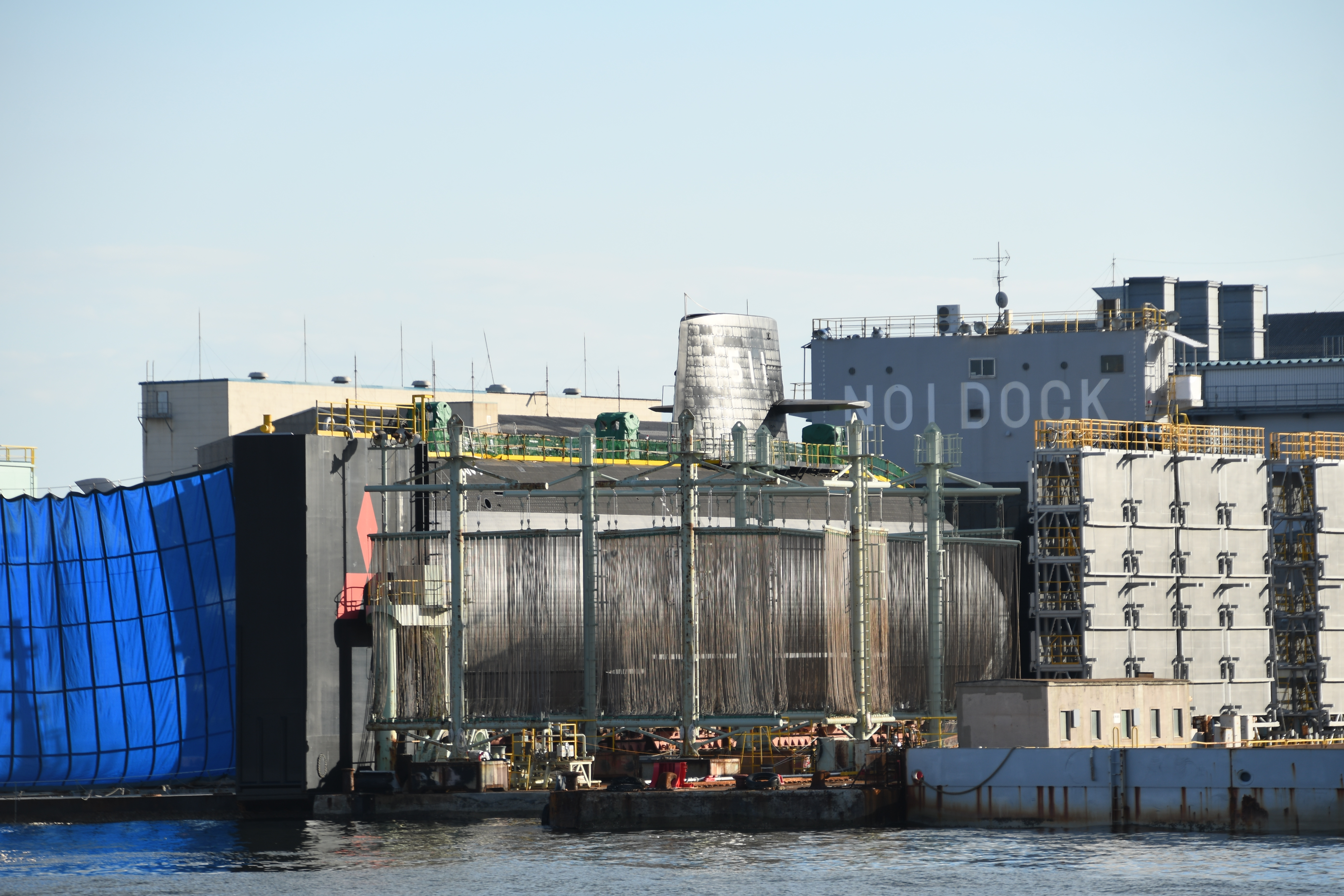
JS Ōryū at Kobe on 7 October 2018.
