= Type 89 torpedo =

Torpedo Type 89
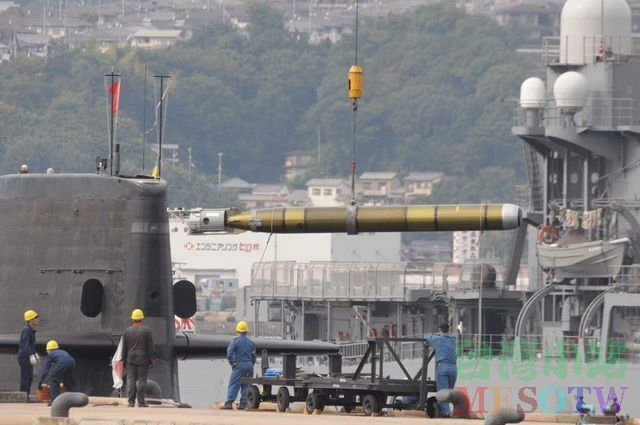
- A Type 89 torpedo being loaded onto a Sōryū-class submarine
- Type: Heavyweight ASuW torpedo
- Place of origin: Japan

Service history
- In service: 1989
- Used by: Japan

Production history
- Manufacturer: Mitsubishi Heavy Industries

Specifications
- Mass: 1,760 kg (3,880 lb)
- Length: 6,250 mm (246 in)
- Diameter: 533 mm (21.0 in)
- Warhead weight: 267 kg (589 lb)
- Engine: swash-plate piston engine
- Propellant: Otto fuel II
- Operational range: 27 nmi (50 km) at 40 knots (74 km/h), 21 nmi (39 km) at 55 knots (102 km/h)
- Maximum speed: 55 knots (102 km/h) maximum possibly 70 knots (130 km/h)
- Guidance system: wire-guided with both active and passive homing modes
- Launch platform: submarine

The Type 89 torpedo (development name G-RX2) is a Japanese submarine-launched homing torpedo produced by Mitsubishi Heavy Industries. Together with the Harpoon, it replaced the unguided Type 72. Development was done by the Technical Research and Development Institute, a department of the Ministry of Defense, and began in 1970, with the design completed by 1984. After being formally approved in 1989 and named "Type 89", it entered service and is currently carried aboard the Oyashio, and Sōryū-class submarines. It was also carried by the Yūshio and Harushio-class submarines before they were retired from active service in 2006 and 2017 respectively.

It is a wire-guided torpedo that features both active and passive homing modes. Compared to Mk-48 (ADCAP) torpedo, it is slightly longer (6.25 m to 5.79 m) and heavier (1,760 kg to 1,676 kg), but has a smaller warhead (267 kg to 295 kg).

The successor to the Type 89 torpedo was developed under the development name "G-RX6" and officially named Type 18 (ja) in 2018. The Taigei class is equipped with a number of Type 18 torpedoes.

== Specifications ==
- Length: 6,250 mm (246 in)
- Weight: 1,760 kg (3,880 lb)
- Diameter: 533 mm (21.0 in)
- Warhead: 267 kg (589 lb)
- Speed: 55 knots (102 km/h) maximum possibly 70 knots (130 km/h)
- Range: 27 nmi (50 km) at 40 knots (74 km/h), 21 nmi (39 km) at 55 knots (102 km/h).
- Operating depth: 900 m
