= Japanese ship Hamana =

Several Japanese ships have been named Hamana:

- JDS Hamana (AO-411), a replenishment ship of the Japan Maritime Self-Defense Force launched in 1961 and decommissioned in 1987
- JS Hamana (AOE-424), a Towada-class replenishment ship of the Japan Maritime Self-Defense Force launched in 1989
