= Towada (disambiguation) =

Towada is a city in Aomori Prefecture, Japan.

Towada may also refer to:

- Lake Towada, a crater lake on the border between Aomori and Akita prefectures, Japan
- Towada-class replenishment ship, a series of ships of the Japan Maritime Self-Defense Force
- JS Towada, the lead ship of the class
