= Hamana =

Hamana may refer to:

- Lake Hamana, Shizuoka Prefecture, Japan
- Hamana District, Shizuoka, Japan
- Hamana High School, Hamamatsu, Japan
- Japanese ship Hamana, several ships
- Hamana (leafhopper), a genus in subfamily Iassinae
- Hamana-ku, Hamamatsu, Japan

== People with the surname ==
- Takayuki Hamana (浜名 孝行; born 1967), Japanese animation director

== See also ==
- Gberedou/Hamana, a region in Guinea
- Tsugaru-Hamana Station, Japan
