= JS Makinami =

Japanese Warship

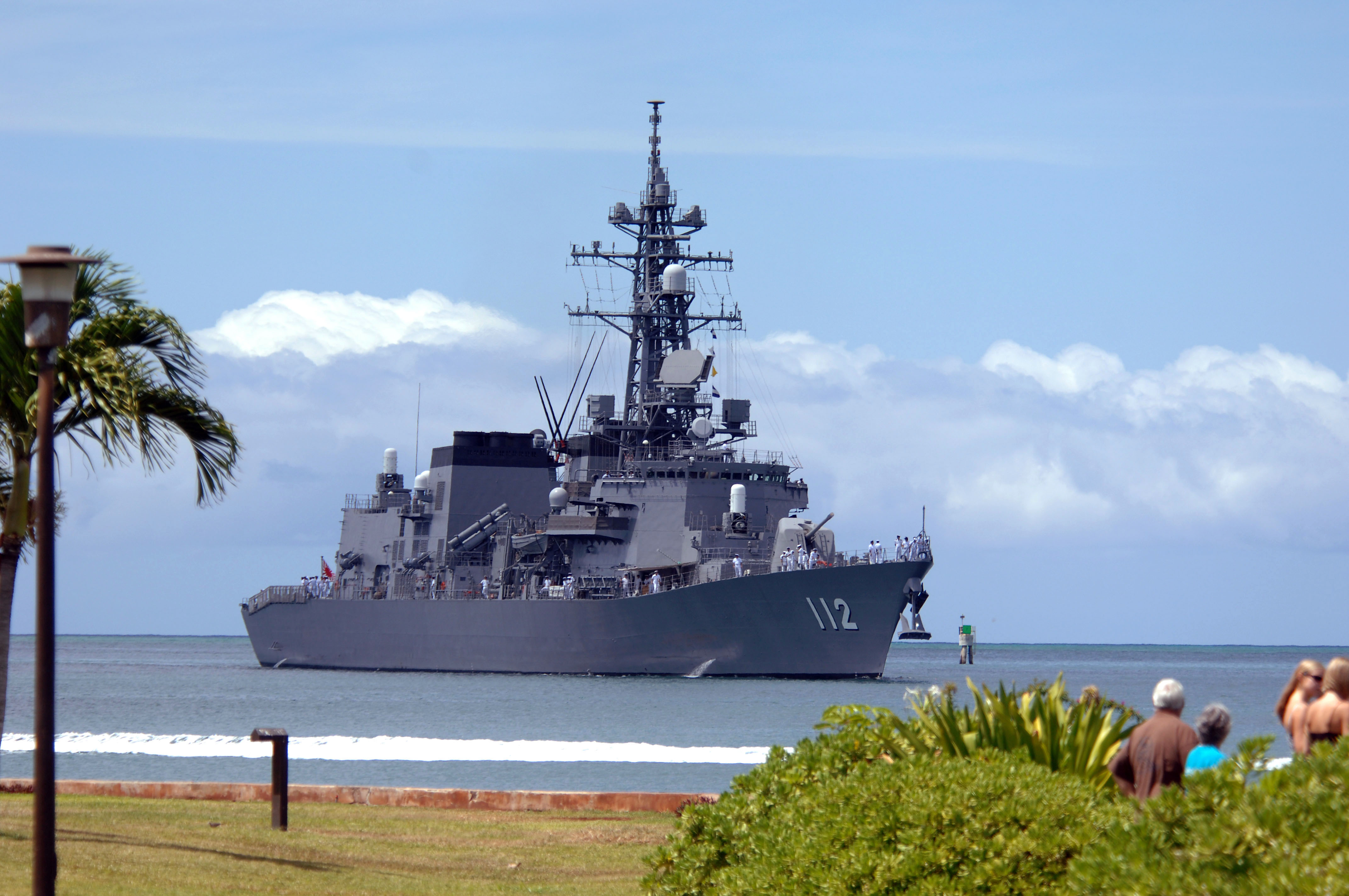
- JS Makinami at Pearl Harbor during RIMPAC 2008

History

Japan
- Name: Makinami; (まきなみ)
- Ordered: 1999
- Builder: IHI, Uraga
- Laid down: 17 July 2001
- Launched: 8 August 2002
- Commissioned: 18 March 2004
- Home port: Ōminato
- Identification: MMSI number: 431999669; Pennant number: DD-112
- Status: Active

General characteristics
- Class & type: Takanami-class destroyer
- Displacement: 4,650 long tons (4,725 t) standard 6,300 long tons (6,401 t) full load
- Length: 151 m (495 ft 5 in)
- Beam: 17.4 m (57 ft 1 in)
- Height: 10.9 m (35 ft 9 in)
- Draft: 5.3 m (17 ft 5 in)
- Propulsion: 2 × Ishikawajima Harima LM-2500 gas turbines; 2 × Kawasaki Rolls-Royce Spey SM1C gas turbines; 60,000 shp (45 MW); 2 shafts
- Speed: 30 knots (56 km/h; 35 mph)
- Complement: 175
- Sensors & processing systems: OPS-25B radar; OPS-28D surface search radar; OPS-20 navigational radar; OQS-5 sonar; UQR-2 towed sonar; Type 81 fire-control system
- Electronic warfare & decoys: NOLQ-3 ECM system; 4 × Mk137 chaff dispensers
- Armament: 1 × Otobreda 127 mm/54 gun; 2 × missile canister up to 8 Type 90 (SSM-1B); 2 × 20 mm Phalanx CIWS; 2 × Type 68 triple torpedo tubes; VLS Mk 41 (32 cells); • Evolved Sea Sparrow SAM; • RUM-139 VL ASROC
- Aircraft carried: 1 × SH-60J(K) anti-submarine helicopter
- Aviation facilities: Hangar and helipad

JS Makinami (まきなみ) is the third vessel of the Takanami-class destroyers of the Japan Maritime Self-Defense Force (JMSDF).

== Design ==
The hull design is generally based on the one of the Murasame class. However, some weapons have been changed, as is the internal structure. And it was said that the large lattice mast was degrading its stealthiness in the Murasame class, so in this class, it was considered to change to two small masts, but it was not implemented.

Although its displacement become slightly increased, there is no change in its main engines, as it is not a big difference that has little effect on the performance of the ship.

== Construction and career ==
Makinami was authorized under the Medium-term Defense Buildup Plan of 1996, and was built by IHI Marine United shipyards in Yokohama. She was laid down on 17 July 2001, launched on 8 August 2002. She was commissioned into service on 18 March 2004. and was initially assigned to the JMSDF Escort Flotilla 2 based at Sasebo.

Makinami, along with the fleet oiler Towada were assigned to the Indian Ocean in November 2006 to provide assistance in refueling anti-terrorist coalition forces in Afghanistan as part of Operation Enduring Freedom. She returned to Japan in March 2007.

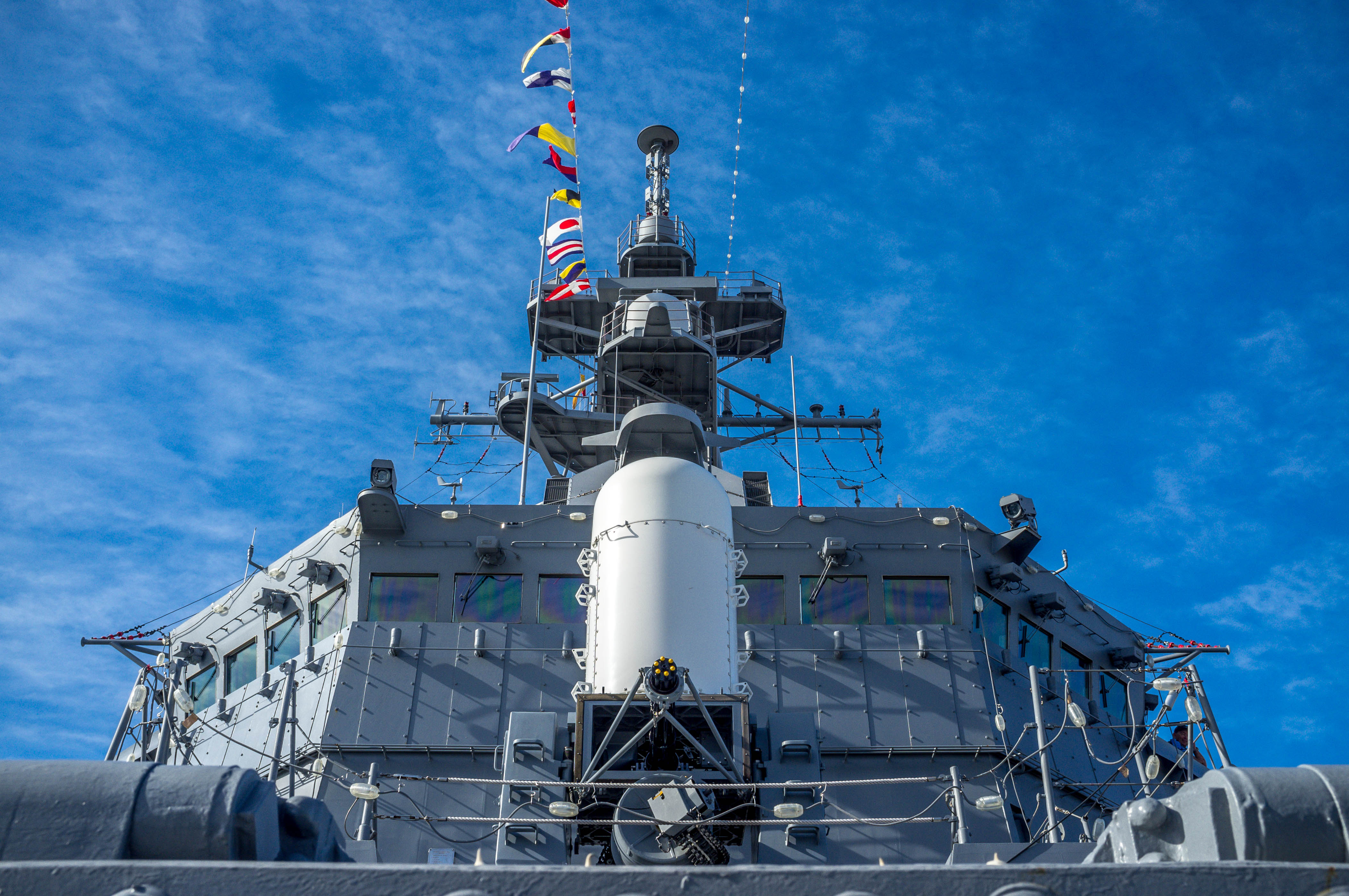
Phalanx Close In Weapons System

In November 2010, Makinami, along with the destroyer Satogiri, was dispatched to Aden, Yemen to participate in anti-piracy escort operations off the coast of Somalia. The destroyer was part of the sixth rotation of JMSDF vessels patrolling in this region. She undertook 28 sorties, returning to Japan on 11 January 2011. On 15 March 2011, she was reassigned to the JMSDF Escort Flotilla 3, based at Ōminato in Aomori Prefecture.

On 13 August 2012 Makinami was dispatched to Aden again, together with the destroyer Yugiri, to resume anti-piracy escort operations off the coast of Somalia. The context for this extended deployment off the Horn of Africa was the "Law on the Penalization of Acts of Piracy and Measures Against Acts of Piracy (Anti-Piracy Measures Law)". Approximately 2,000 merchant ships with ties to Japan, Japan-flagged or operated by Japanese firms pass through the busy shipping zone each year.

Makinami returned to Yokosuka on 11 February 2013 and remains assigned to the Third Squadron of the JMSDF Escort Flotilla 3. In October 2013, Makinami participated in the International Fleet Review 2013 in Sydney, Australia.

In July 2021, it participated in the Pacific Vanguard 2021 (PACVAN) joint exercise off the coast of Australia.

On 21 May 2022, Makinami, Asahi, and the replenishment oiler, Hamana trailed the PLAN Liaoning carrier strike group going towards Miyako-jima.
