= JDS Sagami =

Replenishment ship of the Japanese Maritime Self-Defense Force

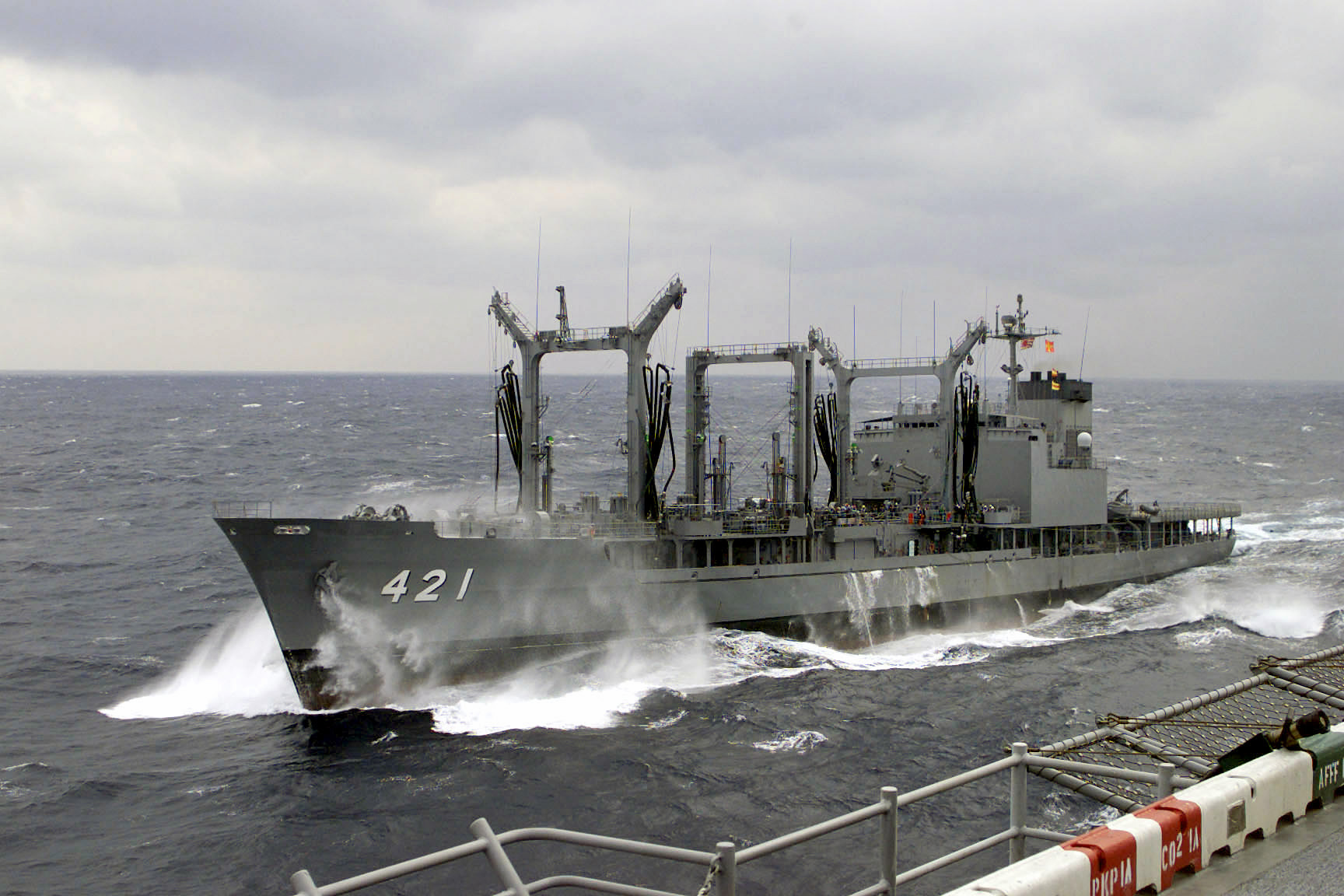
- JS Sagami underway on 3 February 2002.

History

Japan
- Name: Sagami (さがみ)
- Namesake: Lake Sagami
- Owner: Japan Maritime Self-Defense Force
- Ordered: 1962
- Builder: Hitachi Shipbuilding Corporation, Maizuru
- Laid down: 28 September 1977
- Launched: 4 September 1978
- Commissioned: 30 March 1979
- Decommissioned: 3 March 2005
- Identification: Pennant number: AOE-421
- Status: Decommissioned

Class overview
- Preceded by: Hamana class
- Succeeded by: Towada class

General characteristics
- Type: Fast combat support ship
- Displacement: 5,000 tonnes standard
- Length: 146 m (479 ft)
- Beam: 19.0 m (62.3 ft)
- Draft: 7.3 m (24 ft)
- Propulsion: 2 × Mitsui 16V42M-A diesel engines; 18,000 shp (13,423 kW) each; 2 × shafts
- Speed: 22 knots (41 km/h; 25 mph)
- Complement: 130
- Aircraft carried: 1 × helicopter
- Aviation facilities: Helicopter deck

Sagami (AOE-421) is the only ship of her type in the Japanese Maritime Self-Defense Force. She was commissioned on 30 March 1979. She is succeeded by Towada class.

== Design ==
Immediately after the bow, a one-story deck room is provided up to the stern across the bridge, and the 01 deck on the upper surface is also the entire deck. The 01 deck in front of the bridge structure is considered to be the work deck. On the other hand, the rear part was the helicopter platform, and it is capable of carrying one HSS-2 helicopter. The bridge structure has a five-story structure counting from the main deck, and the living quarters are centrally located here. On the other hand, there are three layers of decks inside the hull, but the central part of the hull is a hull compartment, and a tank is provided to store liquid supplies and ballast water through all of these decks.

== Construction and career ==
She is laid down on 28 September 1977 and launched on 4 September 1978. Commissioned on 30 March 1979 with the hull number AOE-421. Decommissioned on 3 March 2005.

== Gallery ==
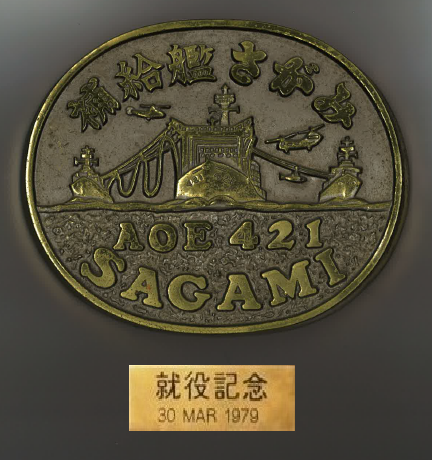
JS Sagami's commissioning commemorative plate.

== See also ==
- Japanese Maritime Self-Defense Force
- Japanese battleship Sagami
