= JS Towada =

Towada-class replenishment ship

- JS Towada on 2 August 1988.

History

Japan
- Name: Towada; (とわだ)
- Namesake: Lake Towada
- Owner: Japan Maritime Self-Defense Force
- Builder: Hitachi Shipbuilding Corporation, Maizuru
- Laid down: 17 April 1985
- Launched: 25 March 1986
- Commissioned: 24 March 1987
- Home port: Kure, Japan
- Identification: Pennant number: AOE-422; MMSI number: 431999512
- Status: Active

General characteristics
- Class & type: Towada-class replenishment ship
- Displacement: 8,100 tonnes standard
- Length: 167 m (548 ft)
- Beam: 22.0 m (72.2 ft)
- Draught: 15.9 m (52 ft)
- Propulsion: 2 × Mitsui 16V42M-A diesel engines; 26,000 shp (19,388 kW) each; 2 × shafts
- Speed: 22 knots (41 km/h; 25 mph)
- Range: 10,500 nmi (19,446 km; 12,083 mi) at 22 knots (41 km/h; 25 mph)
- Complement: 140
- Armament: 1 × Phalanx CIWS
- Aircraft carried: 1 × helicopter
- Aviation facilities: Helicopter deck

JS Towada (AOE-422) is the lead ship of the Towada-class replenishment ships of the Japanese Maritime Self-Defense Force. She was commissioned on 24 March 1987.

== Construction and career ==
She is laid down on 17 April 1985 and launched on 25 March 1986. Commissioned on 24 March 1987 with the hull number AOE-422.

== Gallery ==
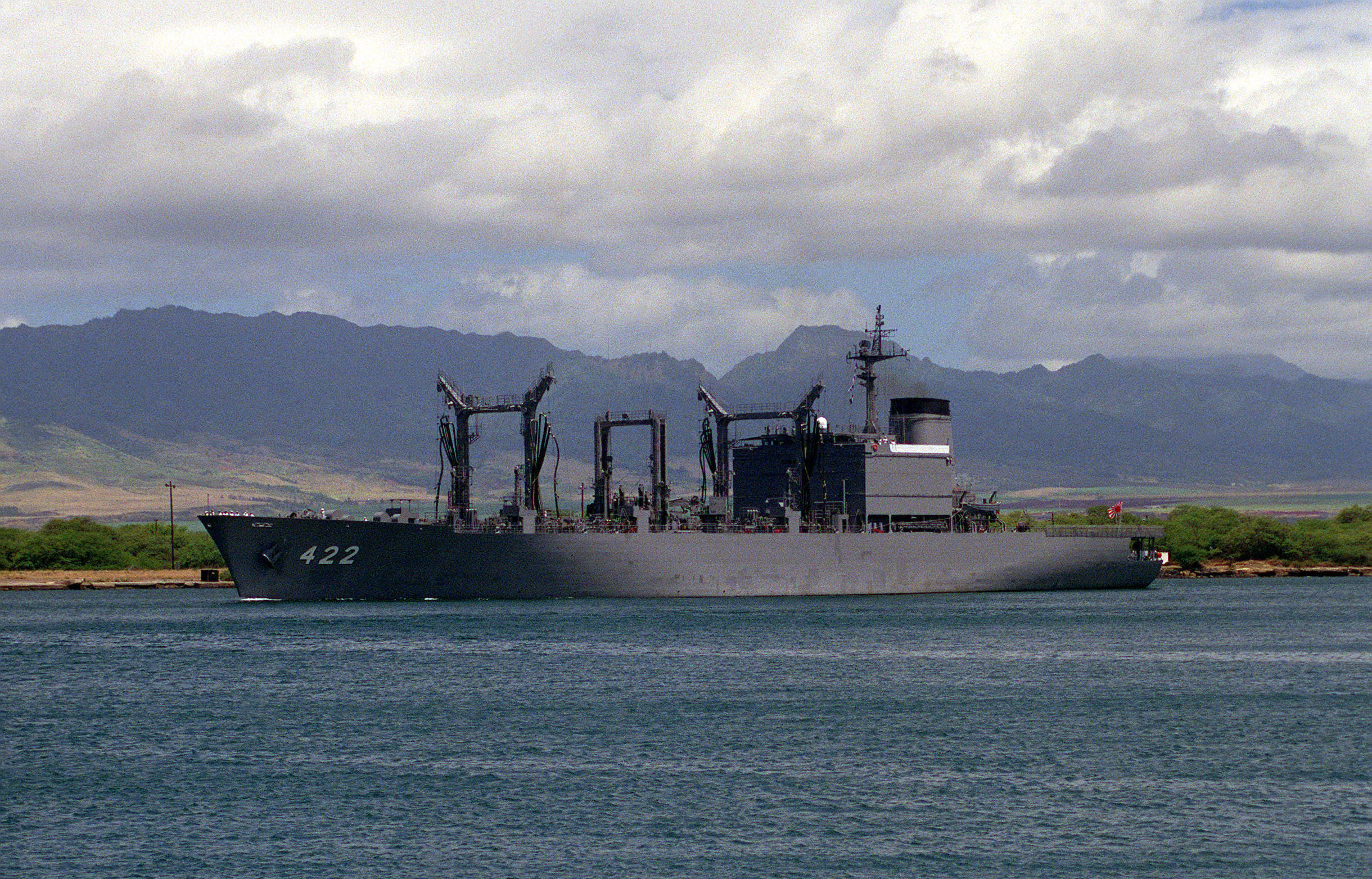
JS Towada leaving Pearl Harbor after a goodwill visit on 1 July 1990.

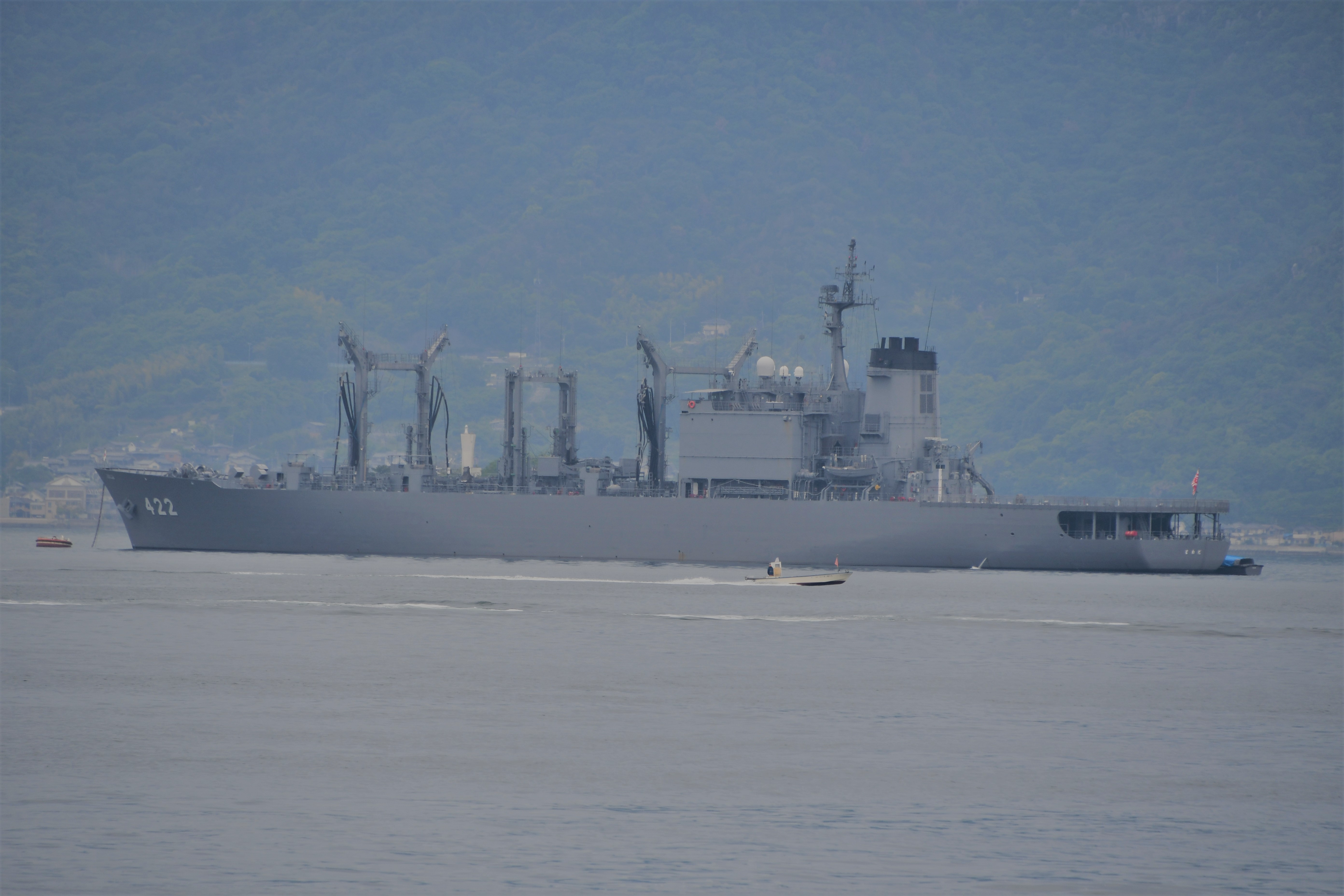
JS Towada underway at Kure, Japan on 6 May 2018.
