= JS Tokiwa =

Towada-class replenishment ship

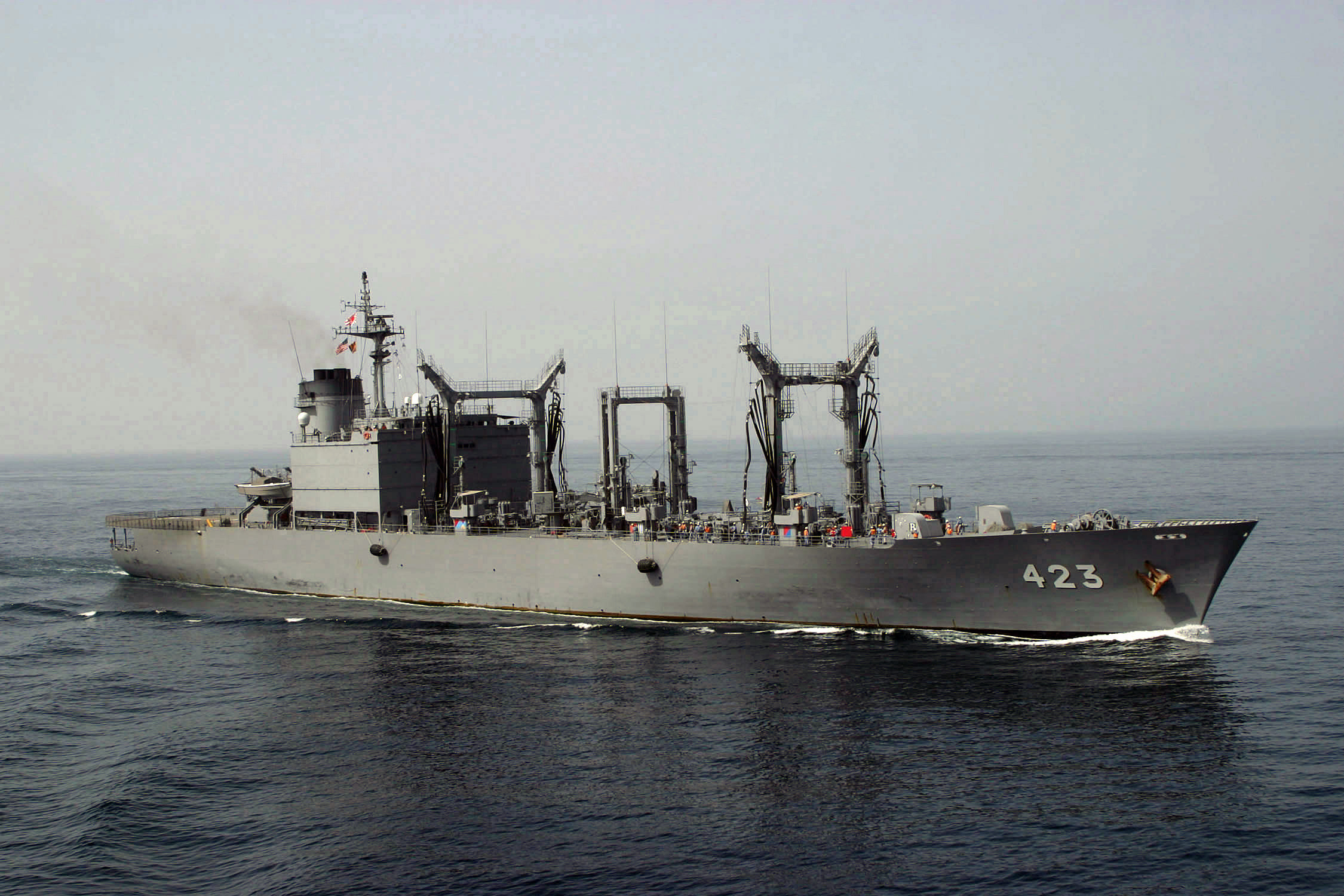
- JS Tokiwa on 15 March 2006.

History

Japan
- Name: Tokiwa; (ときわ)
- Namesake: Lake Tokiwa
- Owner: Japan Maritime Self-Defense Force
- Builder: Hitachi Shipbuilding Corporation, Maizuru
- Laid down: 12 May 1988
- Launched: 23 March 1989
- Commissioned: 12 March 1990
- Home port: Yokosuka, Japan
- Identification: Pennant number: AOE-423; MMSI number: 431999511
- Status: Active

General characteristics
- Class & type: Towada-class replenishment ship
- Displacement: 8,100 tonnes standard
- Length: 167 m (548 ft)
- Beam: 22.0 m (72.2 ft)
- Draught: 15.9 m (52 ft)
- Propulsion: 2 × Mitsui 16V42M-A diesel engines; 26,000 shp (19,388 kW) each; 2 × shafts
- Speed: 22 knots (41 km/h; 25 mph)
- Range: 10,500 nmi (19,446 km; 12,083 mi) at 22 knots (41 km/h; 25 mph)
- Complement: 140
- Armament: 1 × Phalanx CIWS
- Aircraft carried: 1 × helicopter
- Aviation facilities: Helicopter deck

JS Tokiwa (AOE-423) is the second ship of the Towada-class replenishment ships of the Japanese Maritime Self-Defense Force. She was commissioned on 12 March 1990.

== Construction and career ==
She was laid down on 12 May 1988, launched on 23 March 1989 and commissioned on 12 March 1990 with the hull number AOE-423.

== Gallery ==
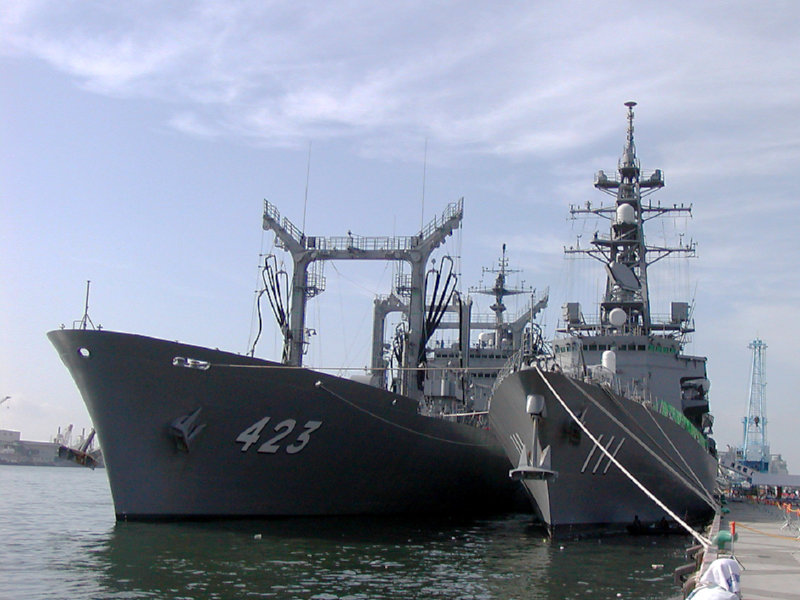
JS Tokiwa and JS Ōnami at the Port of Shimizu on 1 August 2004.

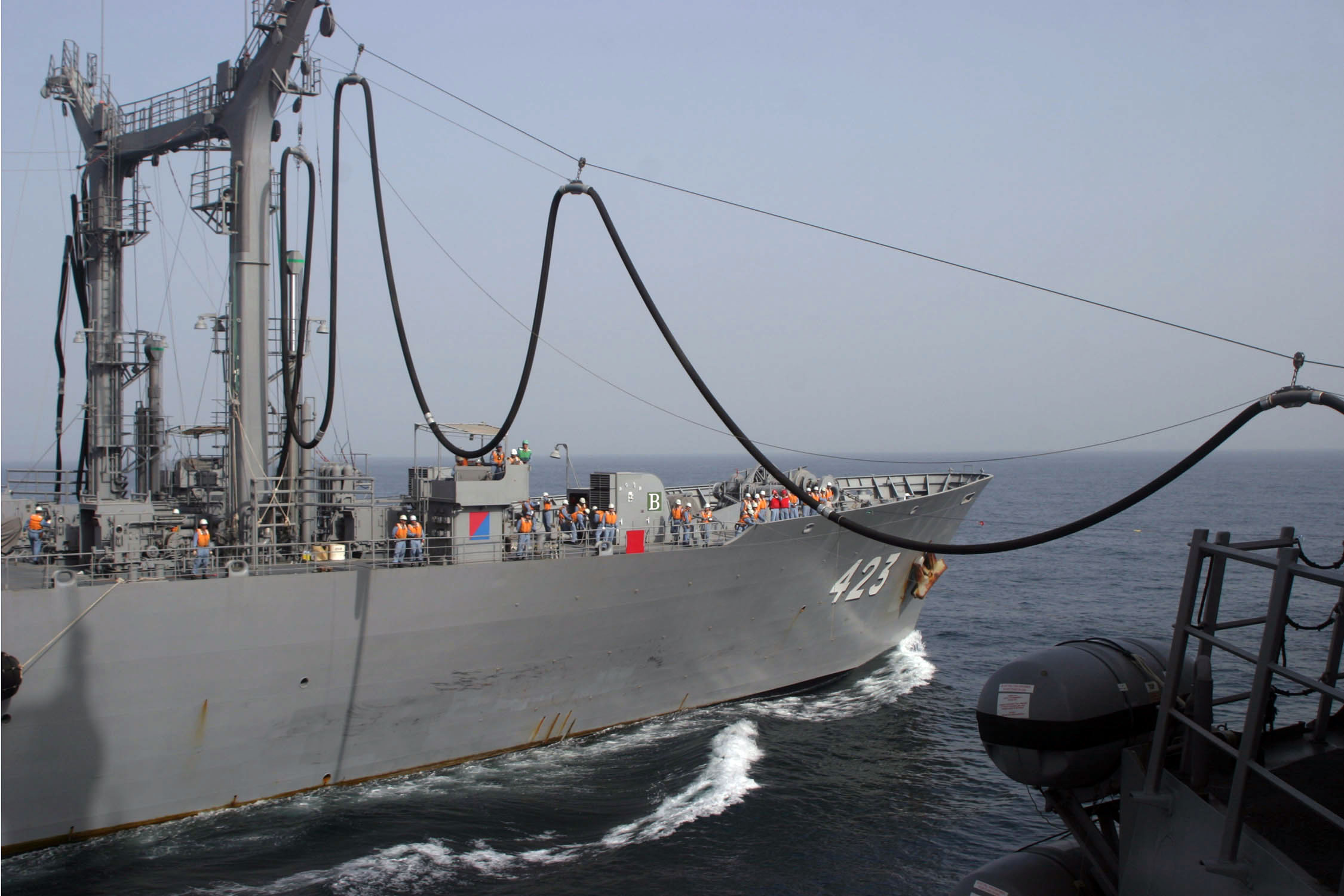
JS Tokiwa refueling with USS Decatur on 15 March 2006.

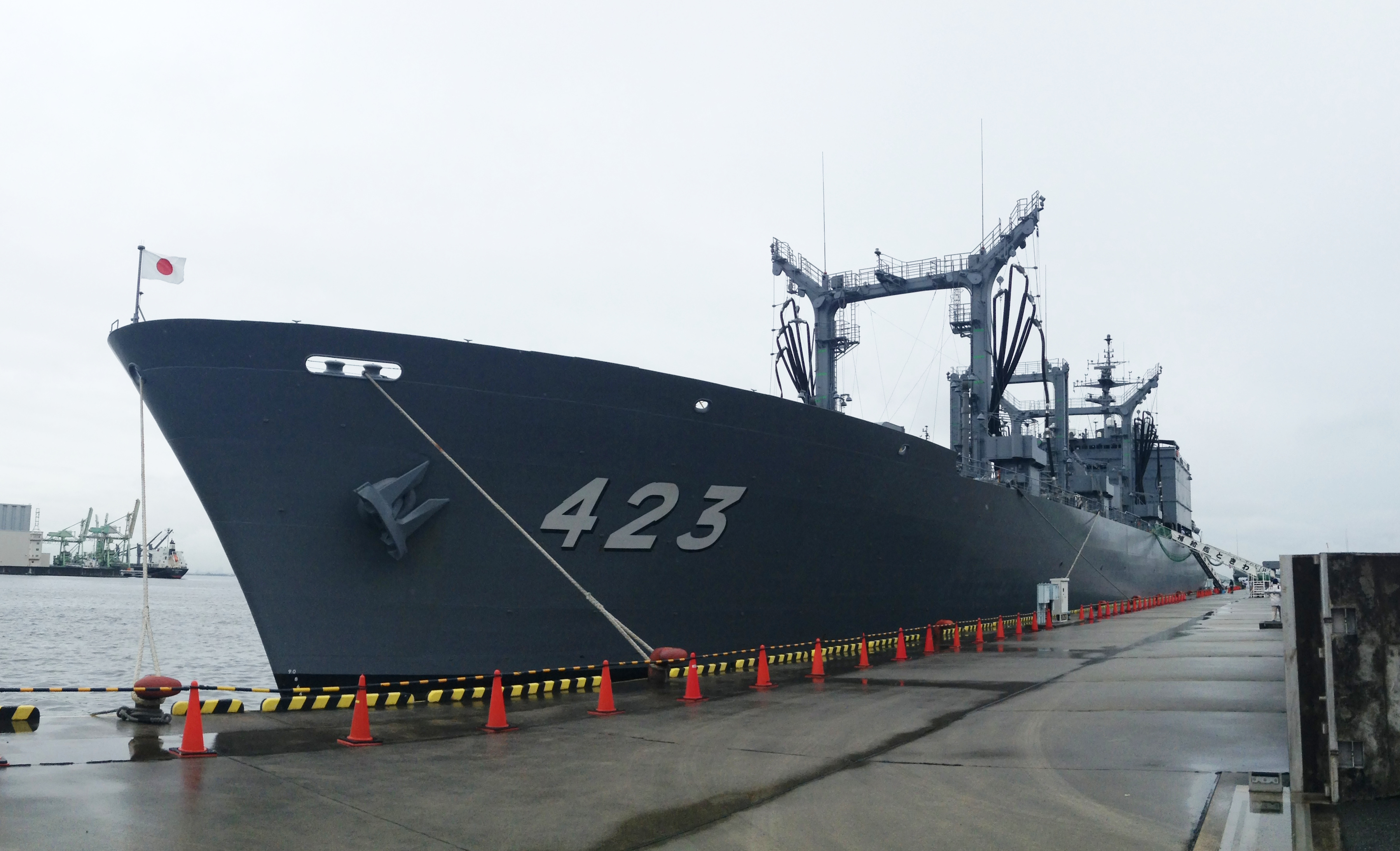
JS Tokiwa on 9 July 2016.

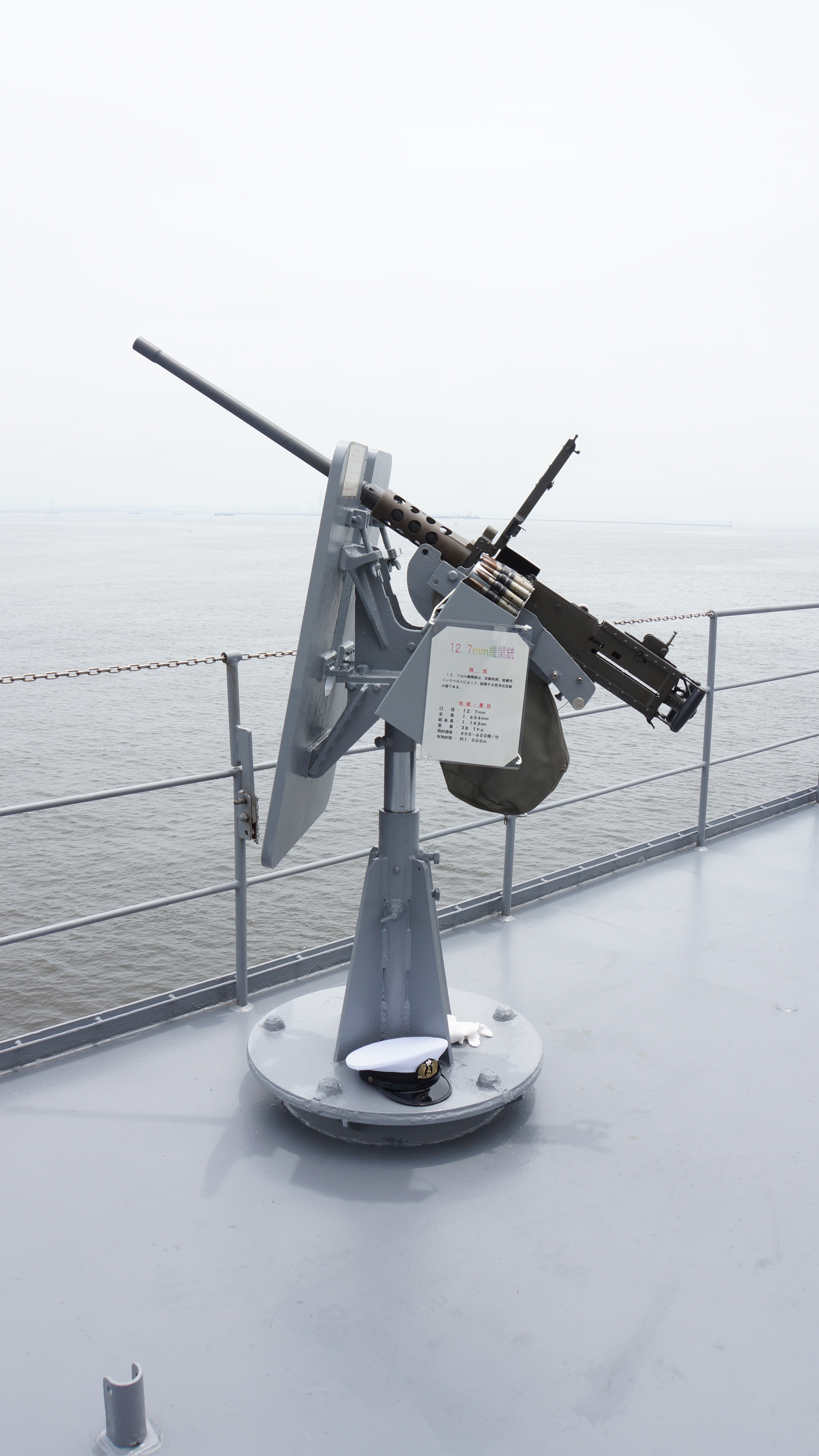
M2 Browning aboard JS Tokiwa at Hanshin Naval Base on 10 July 2016.
