= JDS Hamana (AO-411) =

Replenishment ship of the Japanese Maritime Self-Defense Force

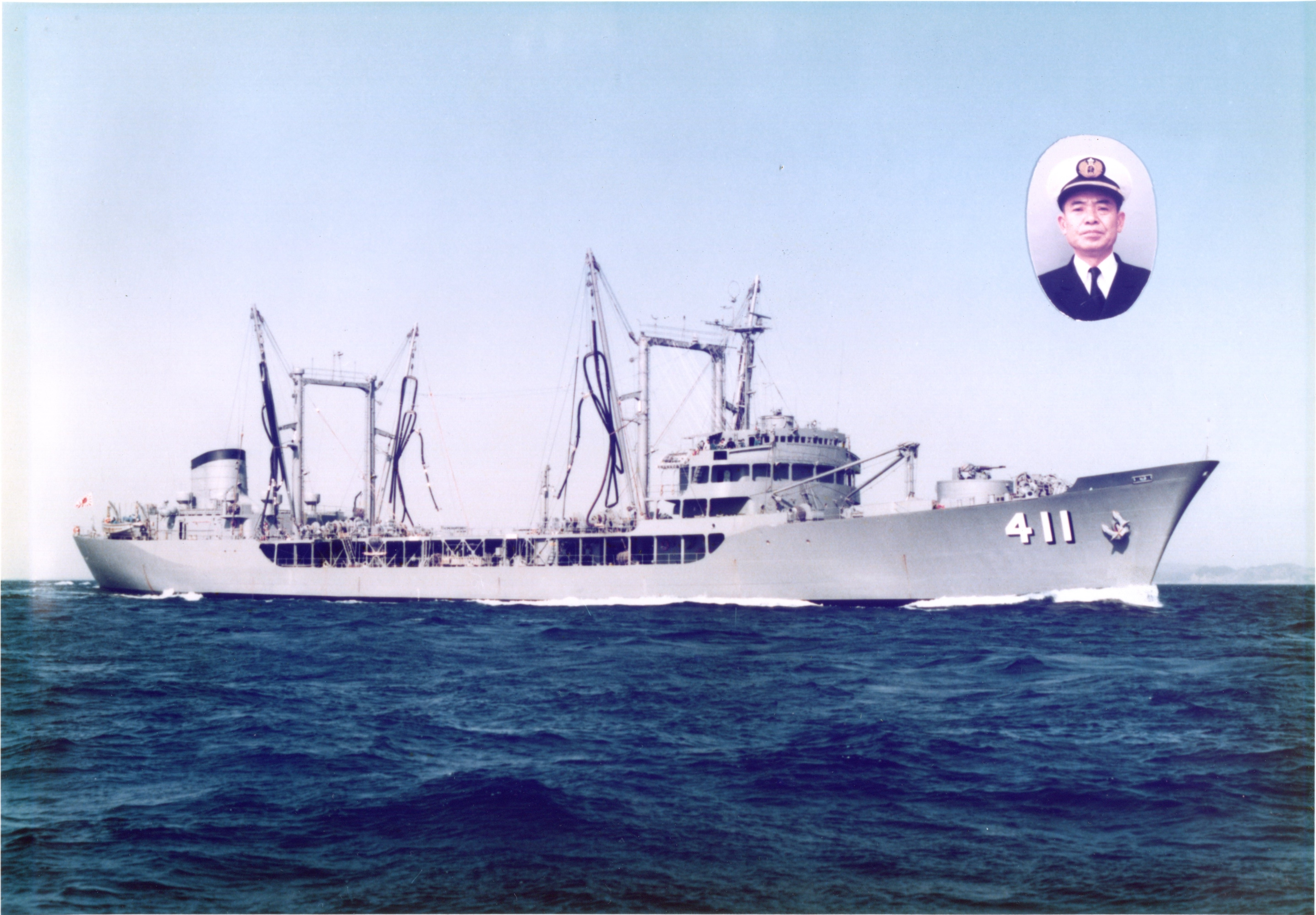
- JS Hamana underway, date unknown.

History

Japan
- Name: Hamana; (はまな)
- Namesake: Lake Hamana
- Owner: Japan Maritime Self-Defense Force
- Builder: Hitachi Shipbuilding Corporation, Maizuru
- Laid down: 17 April 1961
- Launched: 24 October 1961
- Commissioned: 10 March 1962
- Decommissioned: 24 March 1987
- Identification: Pennant number: AO-411
- Status: Decommissioned

Class overview
- Preceded by: N/A
- Succeeded by: Sagami class

General characteristics
- Type: Replenishment oiler
- Displacement: 2,900 tonnes standard
- Length: 128 m (420 ft)
- Beam: 15.7 m (52 ft)
- Draft: 6.3 m (21 ft)
- Propulsion: 2 × Mitsui 16V42M-A diesel engines; 5,000 shp (3,728 kW) each; 2 × shafts
- Speed: 16 knots (30 km/h; 18 mph)
- Complement: 100
- Armament: 2 × Dual 40mm bofors

Hamana (AO-411) was the only ship of her type in the Japanese Maritime Self-Defense Force. She was commissioned on 10 March 1962. She was succeeded by JS Sagami.

== Construction and career ==
She was laid down on 17 April 1961 and launched on 24 October 1961. Commissioned on 10 March 1962 with the hull number AOE-421. Decommissioned on 24 March 1987.

== Gallery ==
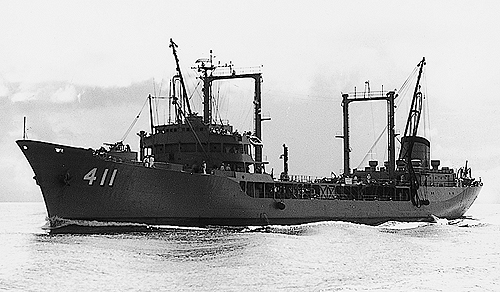
JDS Hamana underway, date unknown.

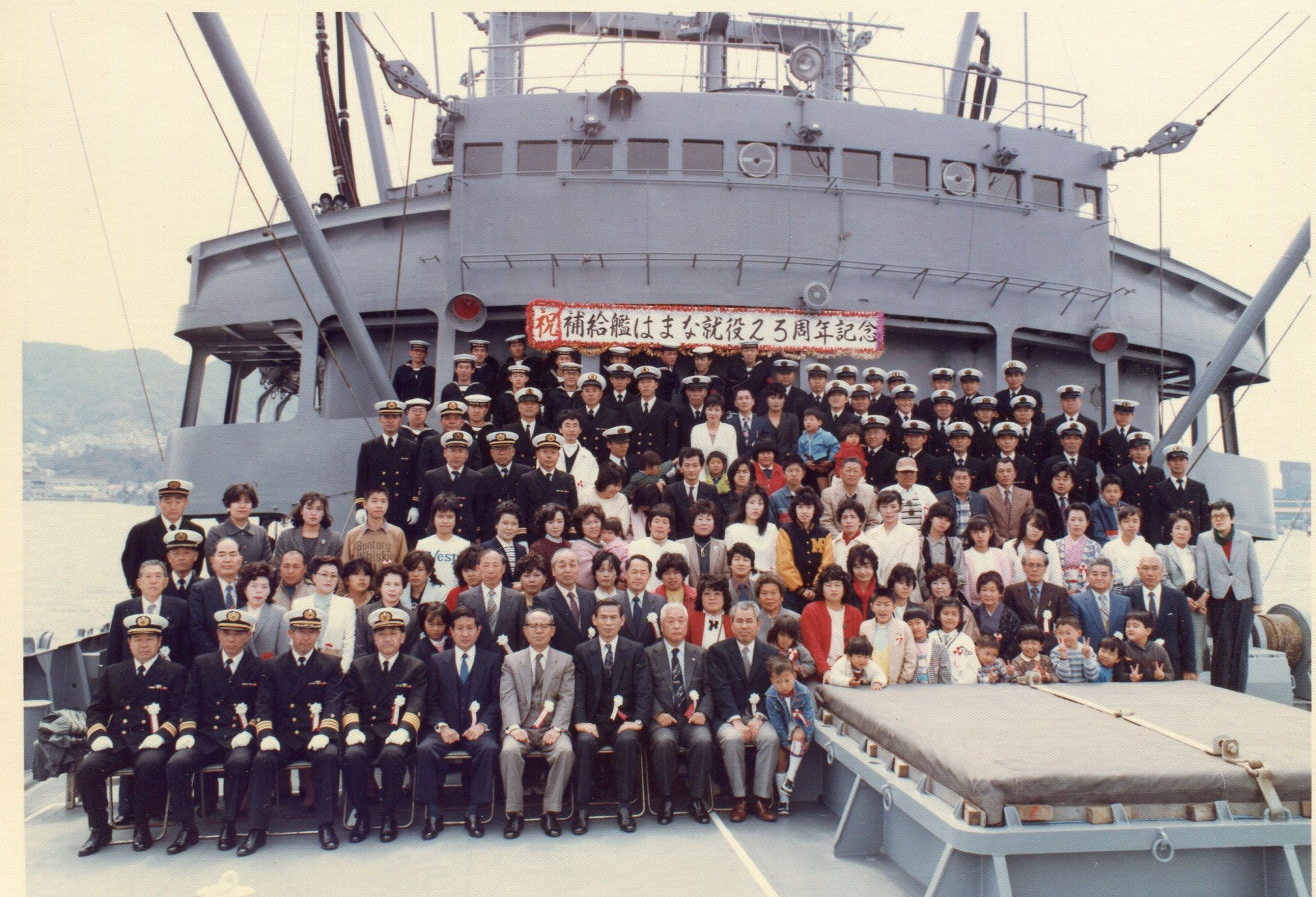
Crew of JDS Hamana.

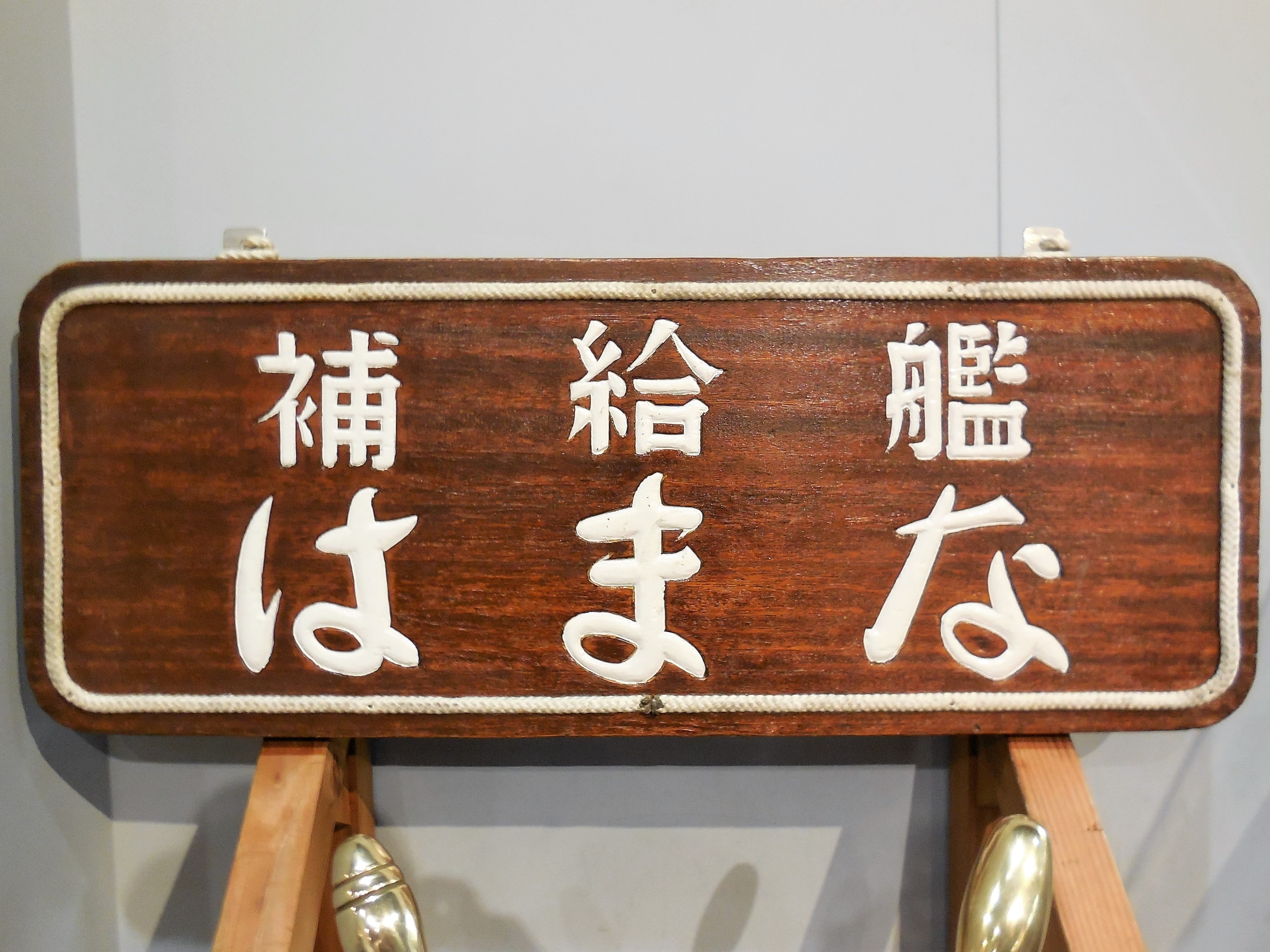
JDS Hamana’s nameplate on display.

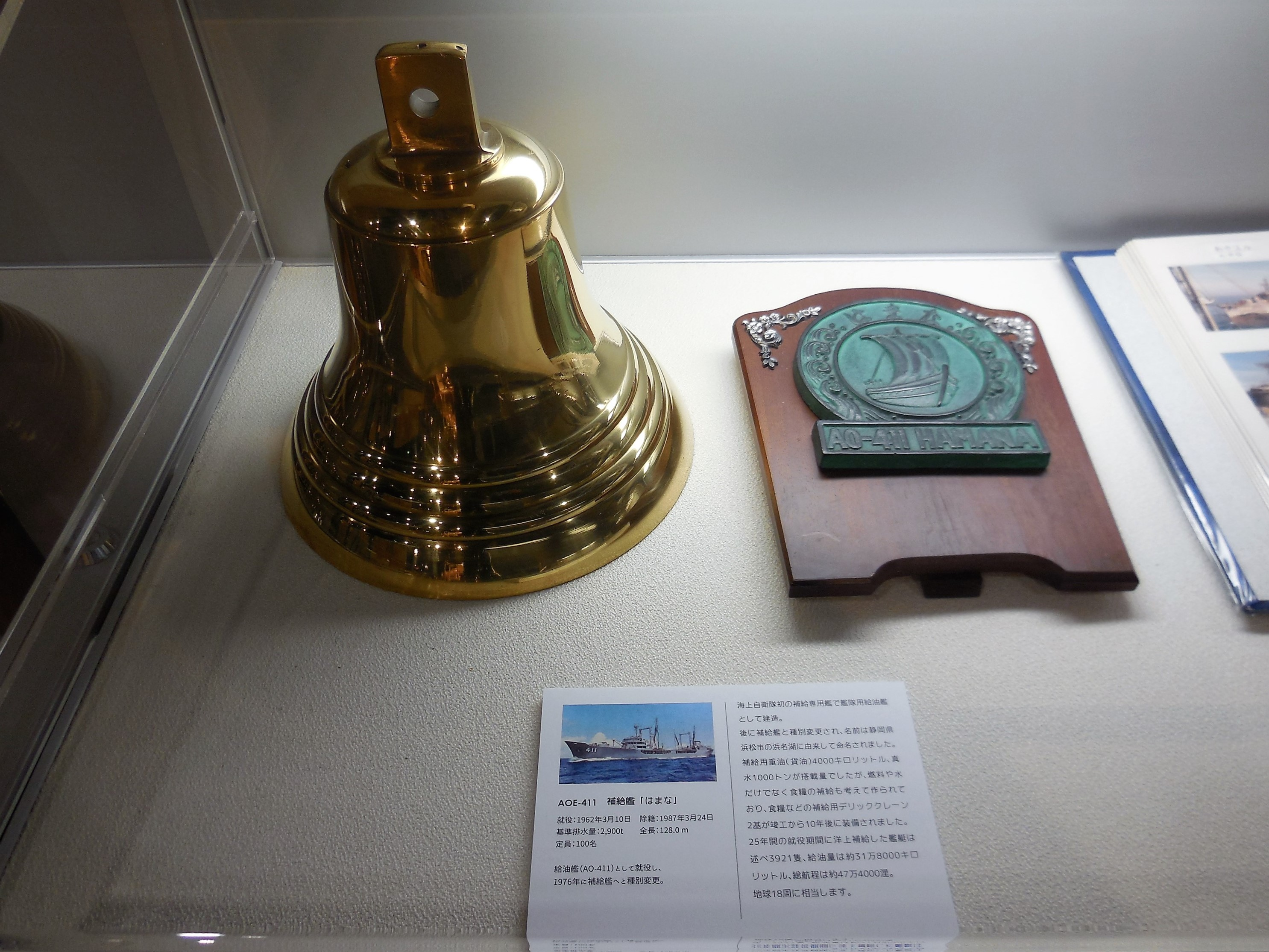
JDS Hamana’s bell and commemorative plaque on display.

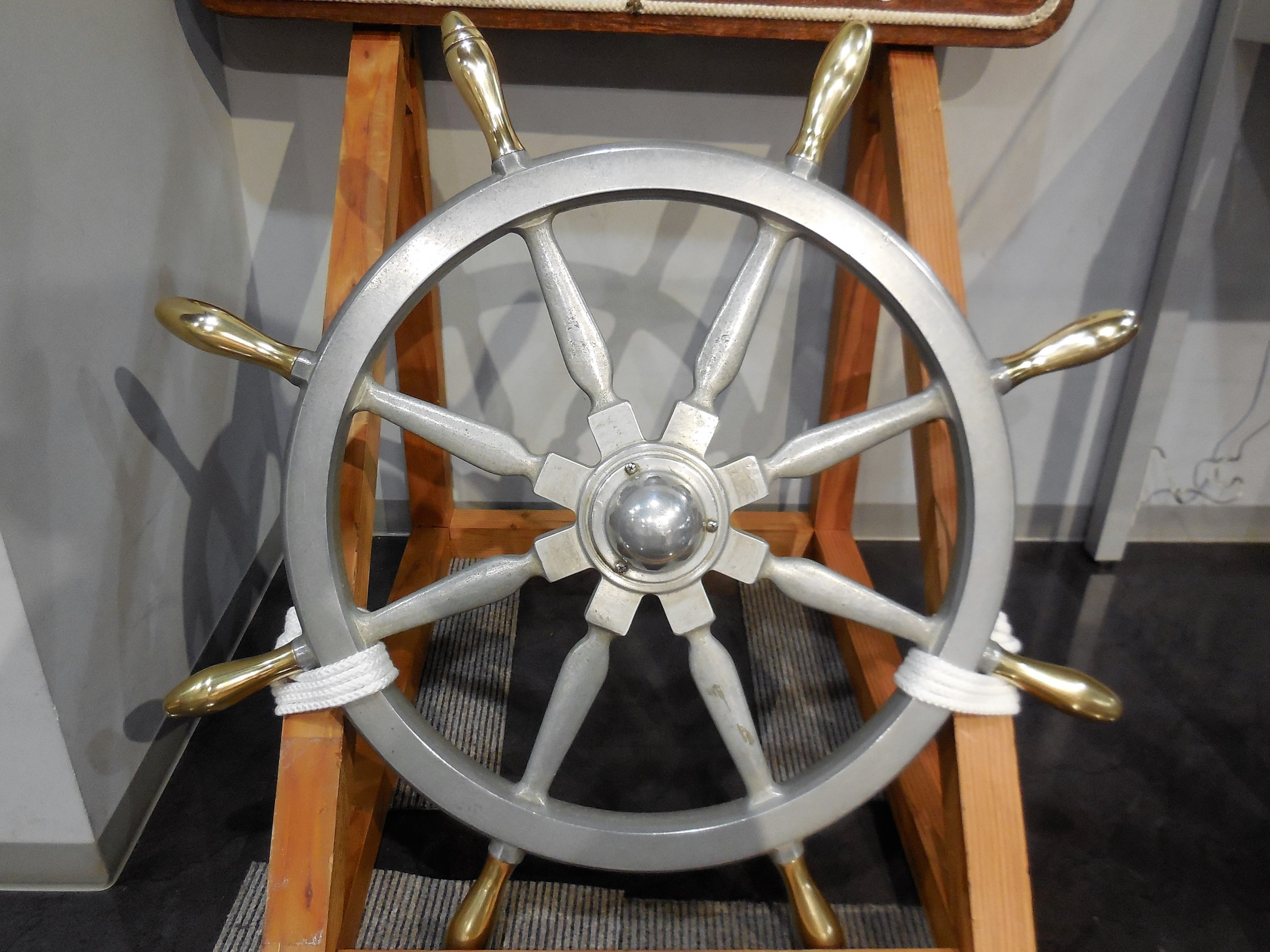
JDS Hamana’s steering wheel on display.
