= JS Hamana =

Towada-class replenishment ship

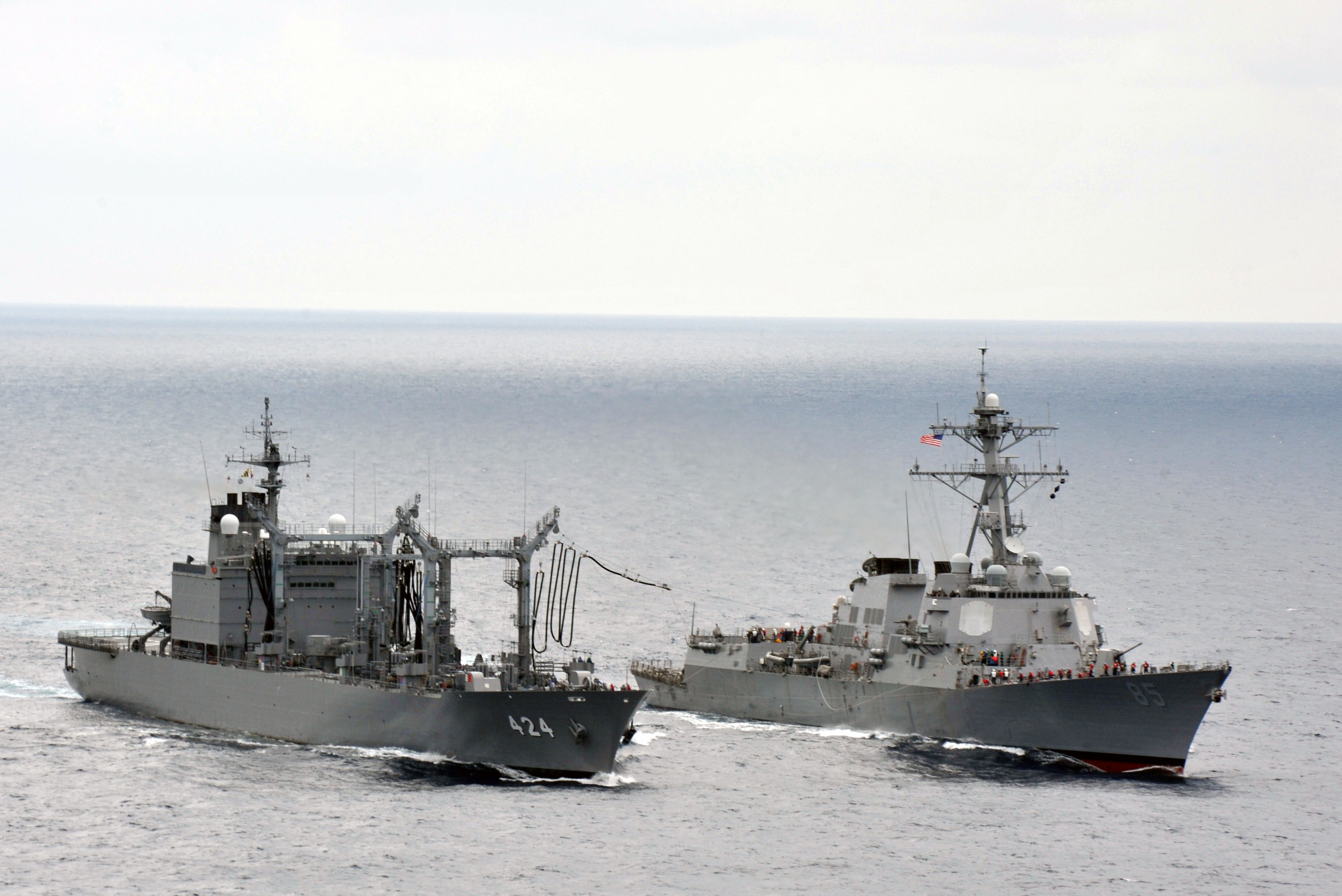
- JS Hamana refueling USS McCampbell on 7 June 2012.

History

Japan
- Name: Hamana; (はまな)
- Namesake: Lake Hamana
- Owner: Japan Maritime Self-Defense Force
- Builder: Hitachi Shipbuilding Corporation, Maizuru
- Laid down: 8 July 1988
- Launched: 18 May 1989
- Commissioned: 29 March 1990
- Home port: Sasebo, Japan
- Identification: Pennant number: AOE-424; MMSI number: 431999513
- Status: Active

General characteristics
- Class & type: Towada-class replenishment ship
- Displacement: 8,100 tonnes standard
- Length: 167 m (548 ft)
- Beam: 22.0 m (72.2 ft)
- Draught: 15.9 m (52 ft)
- Propulsion: 2 × Mitsui 16V42M-A diesel engines; 26,000 shp (19,388 kW) each; 2 × shafts
- Speed: 22 knots (41 km/h; 25 mph)
- Range: 10,500 nmi (19,446 km; 12,083 mi) at 22 knots (41 km/h; 25 mph)
- Complement: 140
- Armament: 1 × Phalanx CIWS
- Aircraft carried: 1 × helicopter
- Aviation facilities: Helicopter deck

JS Hamana (AOE-424) is the third ship of the Towada-class replenishment ships of the Japanese Maritime Self-Defense Force. She was commissioned on 29 March 1990.

== Construction and career ==
She is laid down on 8 July 1988 and launched on 18 May 1989. Commissioned on 29 March 1990 with the hull number AOE-424.

On 19 February 2021, USS Curtis Wilbur and French frigate Prairial conducted a replenishment with JS Hamana.

On 21 May 2022, the Hamana, the JS Makinami (DD-112), and the JS Asahi (DD-119) sighted the PLAN Liaoning carrier strike group going towards Miyako-jima.

== Gallery ==
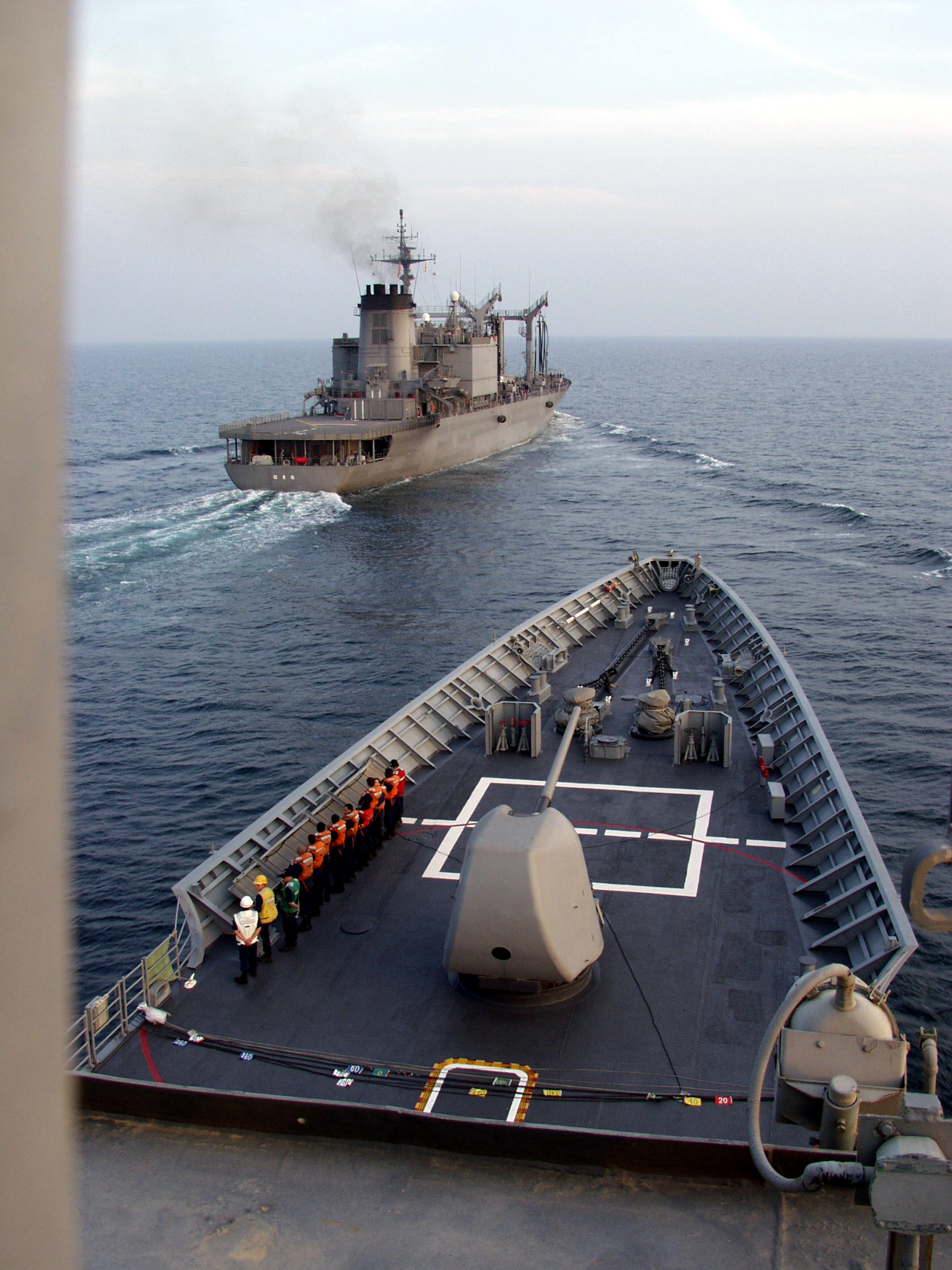
USS Antietam coming alongside JS Hamana for refueling 18 December 2001.

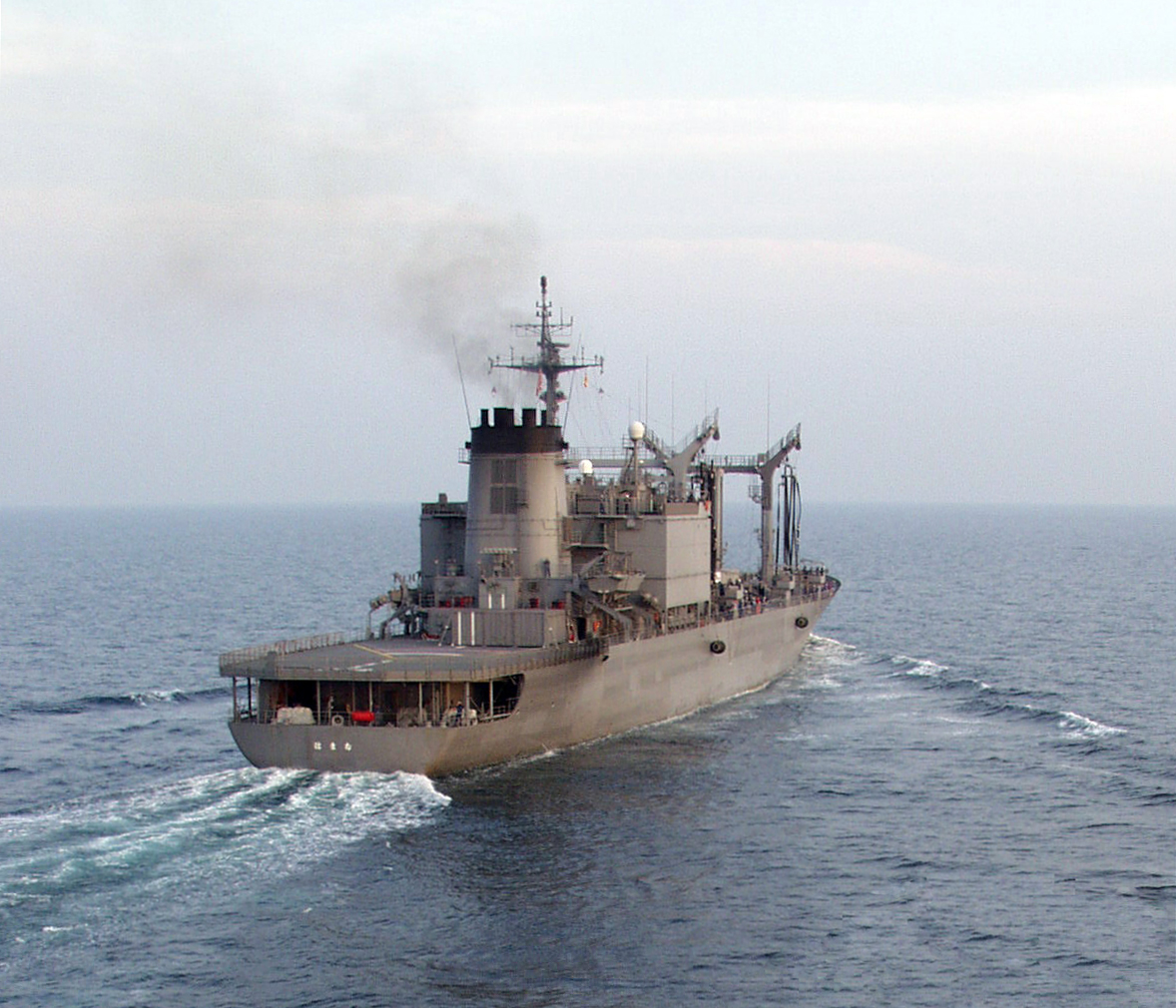
USS Antietam coming alongside JS Hamana for refueling 18 December 2001.

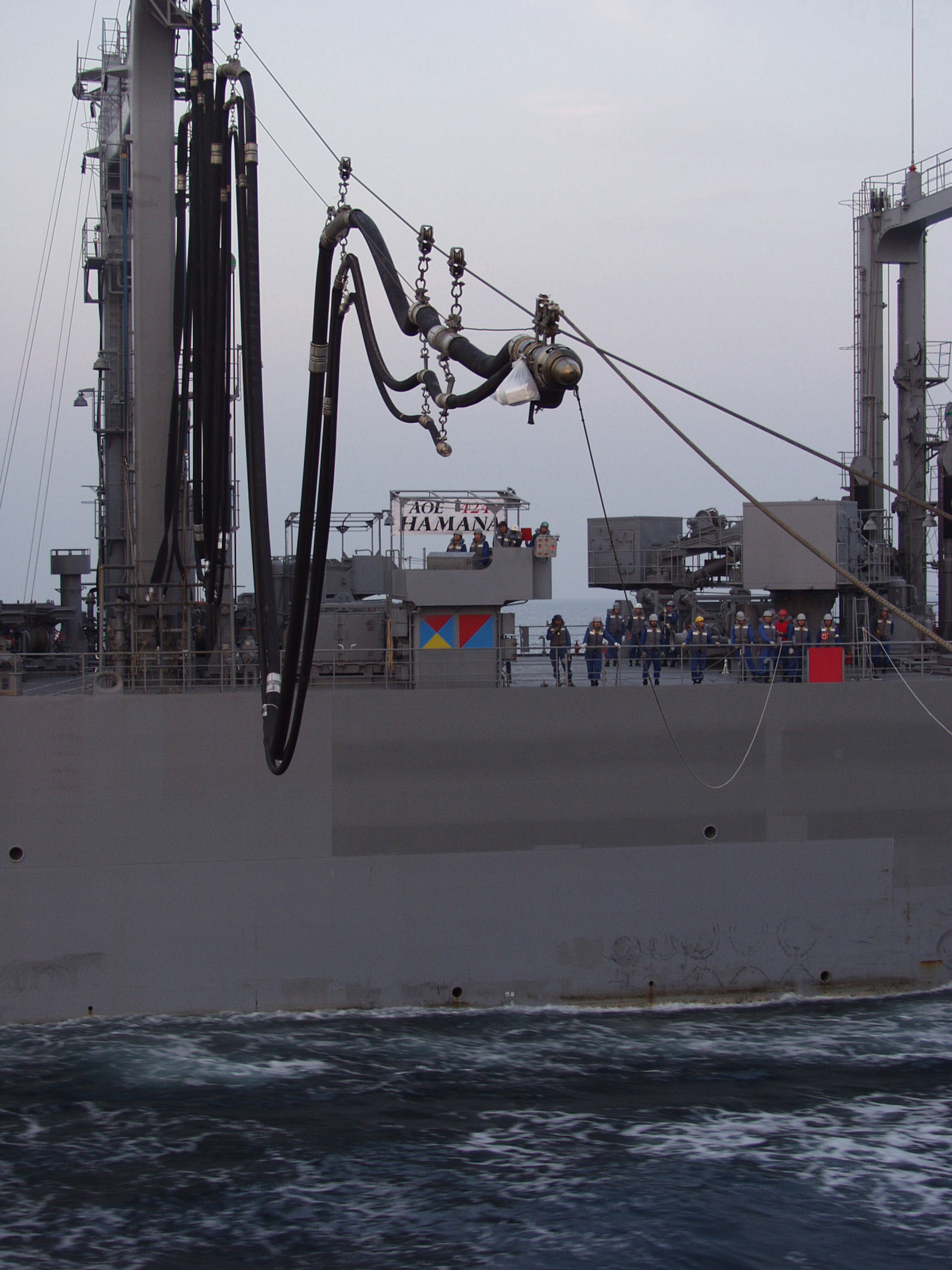
USS Antietam refueling with JS Hamana on 18 December 2001.

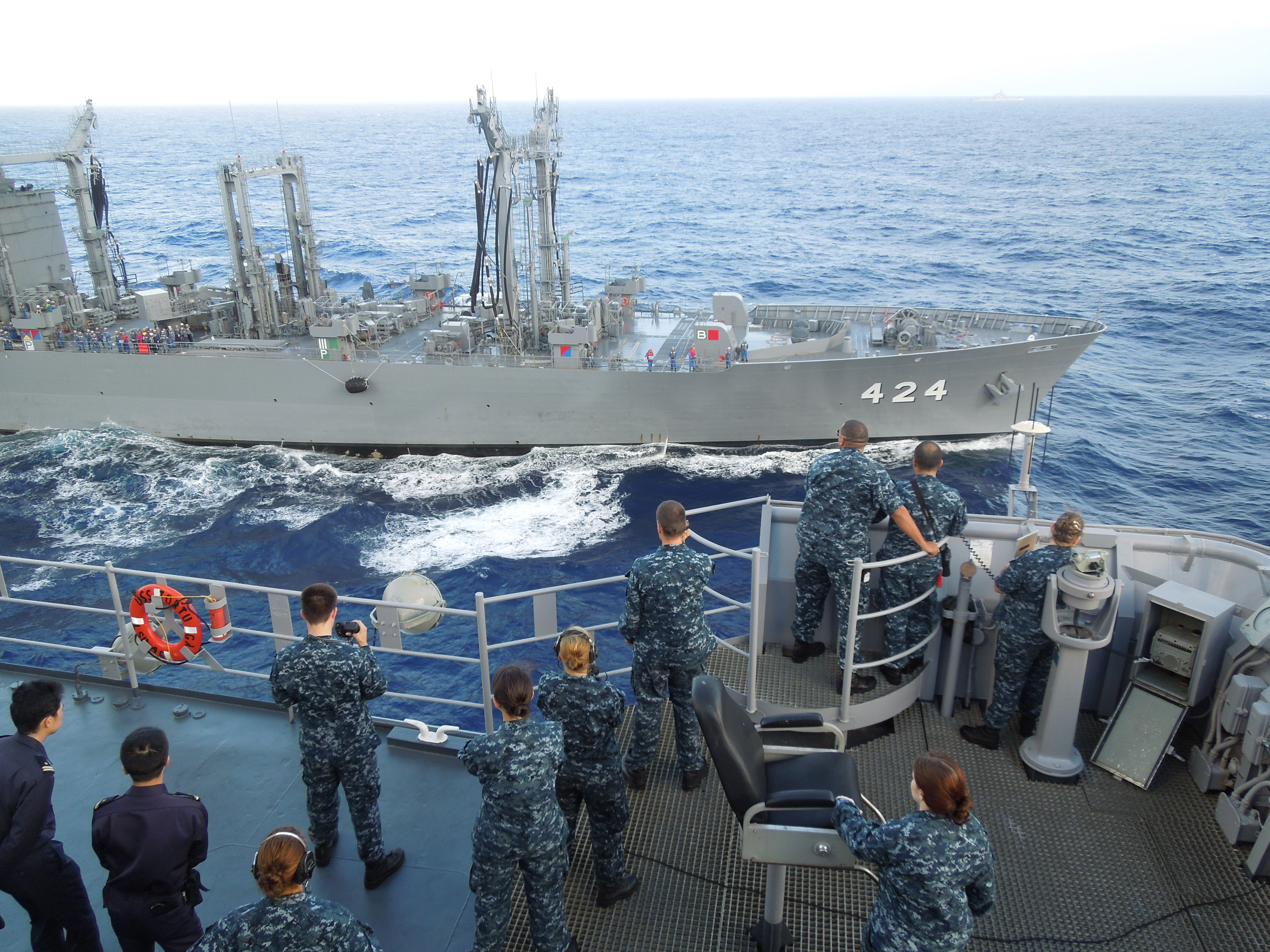
USS Tortuga pulls alongside JS Hamana for refueling on 2 November 2011.

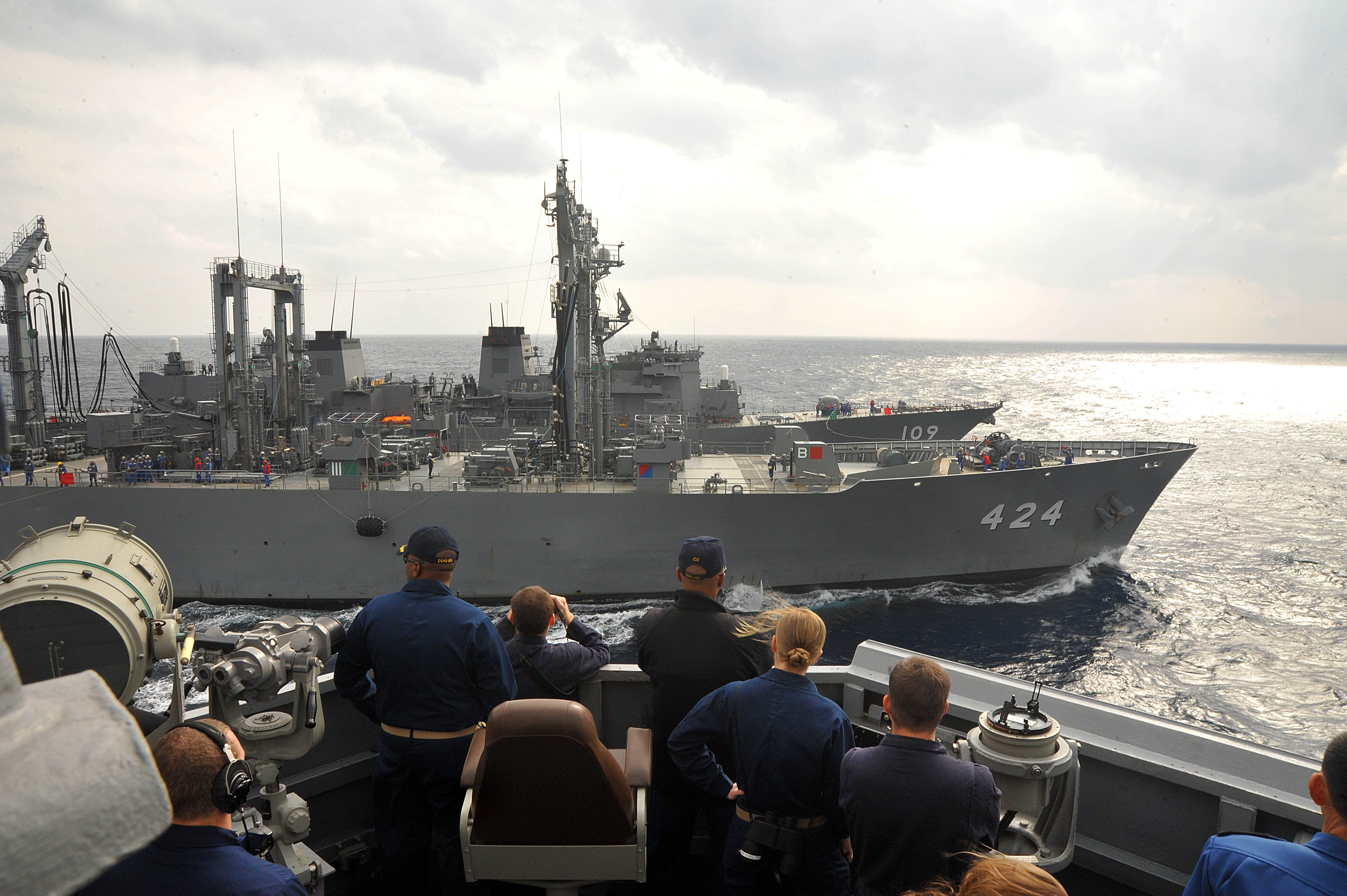
JS Ariake and USS McCampbell refueling alongside JS Hamana on 13 November 2012.
