= Towada-class replenishment ship =

Japan Maritime Self-Defense Force ships

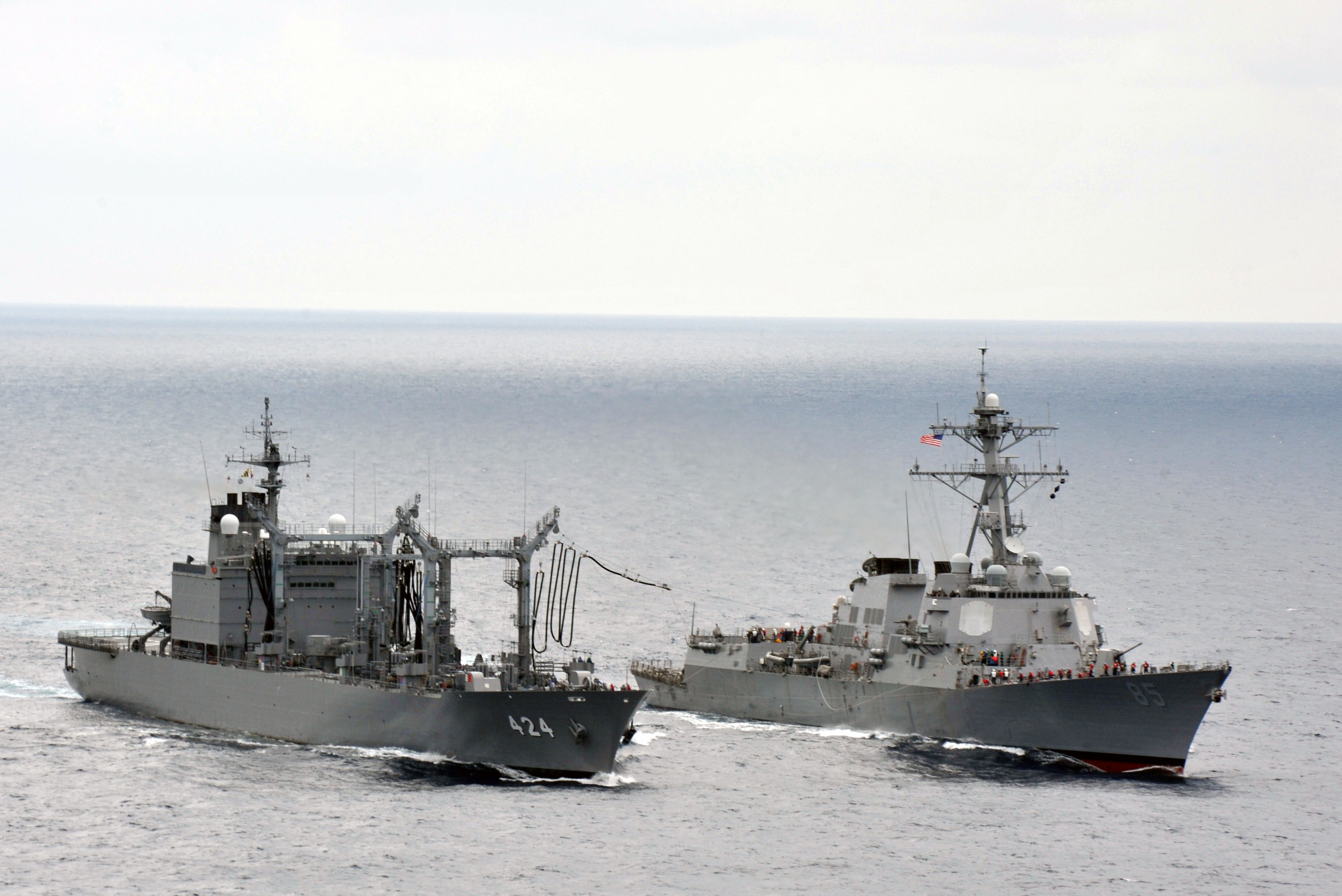
- The US Navy destroyer USS McCampbell, right, conducts a replenishment at sea with Japan Maritime Self-Defense Force fast-combat support ship JDS Hamana in 2012

Class overview
- Builders: Hitachi Shipbuilding Corporation, Maizuru Ishikawajima-Harima Heavy Industries, Tokyo
- Operators: Japan Maritime Self-Defense Force
- Preceded by: Sagami class
- Succeeded by: Mashū class
- Planned: 3
- Completed: 3
- Active: 3

General characteristics
- Type: Fast combat support ship
- Displacement: 8,100 tonnes standard; 12,100 tonnes full load
- Length: 167 m (548 ft)
- Beam: 22.0 m (72.2 ft)
- Draught: 15.9 m (52 ft)
- Propulsion: 2 × Mitsui 16V42M-A diesel engines; 26,000 shp (19,388 kW) each; 2 × shafts
- Speed: 22 knots (41 km/h; 25 mph)
- Range: 10,500 nmi (19,446 km; 12,083 mi) at 22 knots (41 km/h; 25 mph)
- Complement: 140
- Aviation facilities: Helicopter deck only, may carry helicopters up to the size of MH-53E

The Towada-class is a series of replenishment oilers of the Japan Maritime Self-Defense Force (JMSDF). Three ships of the class were built between 1985-89. The ships have the hull designator AOE.

The Towada-class was designed as an enlarged, improved version of the Sagami-class fast combat support ships. The vessels are capable of mounting the Phalanx CIWS by design, although this is not a common occurrence.

== List of ships ==
| Name | Number | Laid down | Launched | Commissioned | Decommissioned | Homeport | Status |
|---|---|---|---|---|---|---|---|
| Towada (とわだ) | AOE-422 | 17 April 1985 | 25 March 1986 | 24 March 1987 | | Kure | Active |
| Tokiwa (ときわ) | AOE-423 | 12 May 1988 | 23 March 1989 | 12 March 1990 | | Yokosuka | Active |
| Hamana (はまな) | AOE-424 | 8 July 1988 | 18 May 1989 | 29 March 1990 | | Sasebo | Active |
